= List of Italian painters =

Following is a list of Italian painters (in alphabetical order) who are notable for their art.

== A ==
- Niccolò dell'Abbate (1509/1512–1571)
- Giuseppe Abbati (1836–1868)
- Angiolo Achini (1850–1930)
- Pietro Adami (fl. c. 1730)
- Eugenio Agneni (1816–1879)
- Livio Agresti (1508–1580)
- Giorgio Matteo Aicardi (1891–1985)
- Francesco Albani (1578–1660)
- Giacomo Albé (1829–1893)
- Giacomo Alberelli (1600–1650)
- Mariotto Albertinelli (1474–1515)
- Pietro Antoniani (c. 1740–1805)
- Ambrogio Antonio Alciati (1878–1929)
- Domenico Alfani (1479/1480–c. 1553)
- Girolamo Alibrandi (1470–1524)
- Silvio Allason (1845–1912)
- Giuseppe Alloia (active c. 1750)
- Alessandro Allori (1535–1607)
- Cristofano Allori (1577–1621)
- Marco Almaviva (born 1934)
- Altichiero (1330–1390)
- Jaber Alwan (born 1948)
- Jacopo Amigoni (1682–1752)
- Giuseppe Amisani (1881–1941)
- Andrea da Murano (active 1463–1502)
- Andrea di Bartolo (1360/70–1428)
- Fra Angelico (1387–1455)
- Sofonisba Anguissola (1532–1625)
- Pietro Annigoni (1910–1988)
- Innocenzio Ansaldi (1734–1816)
- Andrea Ansaldo (1584–1638)
- Michelangelo Anselmi (c. 1492–c. 1554)
- Antonello da Messina (1430–1479)
- Antonello de Saliba (1466–1535)
- Antoniazzo Romano (1430–1510)
- Andrea Appiani (1754–1817)
- Alessandro Araldi (c. 1460–c. 1529)
- Francesco Arancio (1844–?)
- Giuseppe Arcimboldo (1527–1593)
- Bartolommeo Ardy (1821–1887)
- Pellegrino Aretusi (c. 1460–1523)
- Mino Argento (born 1927)
- Gaetano Perratone Armandi (c. 1851–after 1890)
- Giuseppe Arrighi (1642–1706)
- Alessandro Arrigoni (1764–1819)
- Amico Aspertini (c. 1474–1552)
- Gioacchino Assereto (1600–1649)
- Francesco Autoriello (1824–1894)
- Vittorio Avanzi (1850–1913)
- Ignazio Agliaudo (active c. 1737)

== B ==
- Francesco Bacchiacca (1494–1557)
- Baciccio (Giovan Battista Gaulli) (1639–1709)
- Sisto Badalocchio (1585–c. 1647)
- Giuseppe Badaracco (1588–1657)
- Antonio Badile (c. 1518–1560)
- Cesare Balbi di Robecco (1854–1939)
- Alesso Baldovinetti (1425–1499)
- Camillo Ballini (1540–c. 1592)
- Cristiano Banti (1824–1904)
- Jacopo de' Barbari (1460/70–1516)
- Vincenzo Barboni (1802–1859)
- Mario Bardi (1922–1998)
- Barna da Siena (fl. c. 1340)
- Barnaba da Modena (1328–1386)
- Federico Barocci (1526–1612)
- Adolfo Carlo Barone (1861–1936)
- Siro Baroni (1678–1746)
- Bartolo di Fredi (1330–1410)
- Fra Bartolomeo (1472–1517)
- Bartolomeo Veneto (fl. 1502–46)
- Vincenzo Barboni (1802–1859)
- Marco Basaiti (1470–1530)
- Marco Antonio Bassetti (1586–1630)
- Cesare Bassano (1584–1648)
- Francesco da Ponte the 1st Bassano (c. 1475–1530)
- Francesco Bassano the Younger (1549–1592)
- Jacopo Bassano (1510–1592)
- Leandro Bassano (1557–1622)
- Lazzaro Bastiani (1429–1512)
- Pompeo Batoni (1708–1787)
- Giuseppe Bazzani (1690-1769)
- Domenico Beccafumi (1486–1551)
- Gentile Bellini (1429–1507)
- Giovanni Bellini (1430–1516)
- Jacopo Bellini (1400–1470)
- Luigi Benfatto (1551–1611)
- Ambrogio Bergognone (1453–1523)
- Bonaventura Berlinghieri (1210–1287)
- Berlinghiero Berlinghieri (1175–1236)
- Leopoldo Bersani (1848–1903)
- Giuseppe Bertini (1825–1898)
- Francesco Bianchi (1447–1510)
- Francesco Galli Bibiena (1659–1739)
- Nicola Biondi (1866–1929)
- Francesco Bissolo (1470/72–1554)
- Giovanni Battista Bissoni (1576–1636)
- Boccaccio Boccaccino (c. 1467–c. 1525)
- Giovanni Boccati (1420–after 1480)
- Giovanni Boccardi (?–1542)
- Umberto Boccioni (1882–1916)
- Giovanni Boldini (1842–1931)
- Domenico Bologna (1845–1885)
- Giovanni Antonio Boltraffio (1467–1516)
- Benedetto Bonfigli (c. 1420–1496)
- Bonifacio Veronese (Bonifacio de' Pitati) (1487–1553)
- Giovanni Bonini (fl. 1320)
- Bono da Ferrara (?–1461)
- Francesco Bonsignori (c. 1455–1519)
- Paris Bordone (1500–1571)
- Guido Borelli (born 1952)
- Odoardo Borrani (1833–1905)
- Giuseppe Borsato (1771–1849)
- Andrea Boscoli (c. 1560–c. 1606)
- Erma Bossi (1875–1952)
- Carlo Bossoli (1815–1884)
- Giuseppe Bottani (1717–1784)
- Giuseppe Bottero (1846–1930)
- Guglielmo Botti (1829–after 1906)
- Sandro Botticelli (c. 1445–1510)
- Francesco Botticini (1446–1498)
- Raffaello Botticini (1474–1520)
- Donato Bramante (1444–1514)
- Bramantino (Bartolomeo Suardi) (c. 1455–c. 1536)
- Agnolo Bronzino (1503–1572)
- Nicolao Branceleon (c. 1460–c. 1526)
- Buonamico Buffalmacco (1290–1340)
- Giuliano Bugiardini (1476–1555)
- Niccolò di Buonaccorso (?–1388)
- Bernardino Butinone (1450–1510)
- Ludovico Buti (c. 1560–1611)
- Francesco di Bartolommeo Alfei (1421–1495)
- Ansano di Andrea di Bartolo (1421–1491)
- Pietro di Bagnara (also known as Pietro Bagnara Bacchi, fl. 16th century)
- Girolamo Benaglio (fl. 15th century)

== C ==
- Vincenzo Cabianca (1827–1902)
- Camillo Cabutti (1863–1922)
- Guglielmo Caccia "il Moncalvo" (1568–1625)
- Pietro Francesco Caccialupi (1735–1814)
- Vicenzo Caccianemici (fl. 1530)
- Giovanni Cadioli (c. 1710–1767)
- Pio Caglieri (1848–?)
- Baldassare Calamai (1797–1851)
- Giuseppe Calcia (fl. 1725)
- Bartolommeo Calomato (fl. 17th century)
- Rinaldo di Calvi (died 1528)
- Pietro Calzetta (fl. 1470–1500)
- Luca Cambiasi (1527–1585)
- Michele Cammarano (1835–1920)
- Bartolomeo da Camogli (fl. 14th century)
- Agostino Campanella (fl. 1770)
- Galeazzo Campi (1475/1477–1536)
- Vincenzo Campi (1536–1591)
- Canaletto (1697–1768)
- Vincenzo Capobianchi (1836–1928)
- Bartolomeo Caporali (c. 1420–c. 1503/1505)
- Giuseppe Orazio Capretti (1641–1725)
- Aliprando Caprioli (fl. 1575–1599)
- Domenico Caprioli (1494–1528)
- Antonio Capulongo (fl. 16th century)
- Cecco del Caravaggio (fl. c.1620)
- Marco Cardisco (c. 1486–c. 1542)
- Bartolomeo Carducci (1560–1608)
- Luca Carlevarijs (1663–1730)
- Giulio Carmignani (1813–1890)
- Fra Simone da Carnuli (fl. 1519)
- Paolo Carosone (born 1941)
- Giuseppe Carozzi (1864–1938)
- Agostino Carracci (1557–1602)
- Annibale Carracci (1560–1609)
- Ludovico Carracci (1555–1619)
- Caravaggio (1573–1610)
- Fernando Carcupino (1922–2003)
- Shola Carletti (fl. 21st century)
- Andrea Carlone (1626–1697)
- Giovanni Battista Carlone (1603–1684)
- Giovanni Bernardo Carlone (1590–1630)
- Domenico Carnovale (fl. 1564)
- Carpaccio (c. 1460–c. 1525)
- Domenico Carpinoni (1566–1658)
- Rosalba Carriera (1673–1757)
- Niccolò Casolani (1659–1714)
- Felice Casorati (1883–1963)
- Stefano Cassiani (1636–1714)
- Andrea del Castagno (1421–1457)
- Leonardo Castellani (1896–1984)
- Guglielmo Castelli (born 1987)
- Raffaelle Castellini (died 1864)
- Fabrizio Castello (c. 1486–c. 1542)
- Vincenzo Catena (1470–1531)
- Pasquale Cati (1550–1620)
- Paoluccio Cattamara (fl. 1718)
- Giovanni Paolo Cavagna (c. 1550–1627)
- Bernardo Cavallino (1616–1656)
- Giacomo Cavedone (1577–1660)
- Paolo Caylina the Younger (fl. 16th century)
- Rodolfo Ceccotti (born 1945)
- Adriano Cecioni (1836–1886)
- Quinto Cenni (1845–1917)
- Giulia Centurelli (1832–1872)
- Giacomo Ceruti (1698–1767)
- Giovanni Maria Cerva (fl. 17th century)
- Felice Cervetti (1718–1779)
- Arturo Checchi (1886–1971)
- Tito Chelazzi (1834–1892)
- Marco Chierice (1580–?)
- Giorgio de Chirico (1888–1978)
- Michele Ciampanti (?–1510)
- Carlo Cignani (1628–1719)
- Giambettino Cignaroli (1706–1770)
- Cimabue (1240–1302)
- Marco Cingolani (born 1961)
- Vincenzo Civerchio (1470–1544)
- Roberto Clerici the Younger (1711–1748)
- Sigismondo Coccapani (1585–1643)
- Leonardo Coccorante (1680–1750)
- Colantonio (c. 1420–c. 1460)
- Piergiorgio Colautti (born 1934)
- Michele Coltellini (1480–1542)
- Giacomo Coltrini (fl. 16th century)
- Cima da Conegliano (c. 1459–c. 1517)
- Jacopo Coppi (1523–1591)
- Luigi Corbellini (1901–1968)
- Gianetto Cordegliaghi (fl. early 16 century)
- Leonardo Corona (1561–1605)
- Correggio (1494–1534)
- Hermann David Salomon Corrodi (1844–1905)
- Niccolò Corso (1446–c. 1512)
- Pietro da Cortona (1596–1669)
- Francesco del Cossa (1436–1478)
- Giovanni Costa (1826–1903)
- Lorenzo Costa (1460–1535)
- Carlo Cozza (c. 1700–1769)
- Giovanni Battista Crema (1883–1964)
- Daniele Crespi (1598–1630)
- Giovan Battista Crespi (il Cerano) (1573–1632)
- Giuseppe Maria Crespi (Lo Spagnuolo) (1665–1747)
- Donato Creti (1671–1749)
- Carlo Crivelli (1430–1495)
- Vittore Crivelli (1440–1502)
- Baldassare Croce (1558–1628)
- Carlo Curci (1846–after 1916)
- Francesco Curradi (1570–1661)

== D ==
- Bernardo Daddi (c. 1280–1348)
- Pino Daeni (1939–2010)
- Ottaviano da Faenza (fl. 14th century)
- Vito D'Ancona (1825–1884)
- Cosmo D'Angeli (1889–1968)
- Daniele da Volterra (c.1509 –1566)
- Augusto De Arcangelis (1868–?)
- Cristofano dell'Altissimo (c. 1525–1605)
- Vincenzo De Mita (1751–after 1805)
- Giuseppe De Sanctis (1858–1924)
- Serafino De Tivoli (1826–1892)
- Giorgio De Vincenzi (1884–1965)
- Luigi Deleidi (1784–1853)
- Francesco Denanto (fl. 1520–1532)
- Beppe Devalle (1940–2013)
- Fra Diamante (c. 1430–c.1498)
- Cristoforo Diana (1543–1636)
- Carlo Dolci (1616–1686)
- Domenichino (1581–1641)
- Francesco Pio Dotti (born 1956)
- Domenico di Bartolo (c. 1400/1404–1445/1447)
- Paolo Di Falco (1674–?)
- Domenico di Zanobi (active 1460–1481)
- Domenico Veneziano (c. 1410–1461)
- Enrico Donati (1909–2008)
- Edelberto Dosi (1852–1891)
- Dosso Dossi (c. 1490–1542)
- Giuseppe Drugman (1810–1846)
- Duccio (1255–1319)
- Nicolo Dorigati (fl. 1689–1736)

== F ==
- Giovanni Fattori (1825–1908)
- Martino Ferabosco (fl. 17th century)
- Arnaldo Ferraguti (1862–1925)
- Floriano Ferramola (c. 1478–1528)
- Defendente Ferrari (1480/1485–1540)
- Gaudenzio Ferrari (1471–1546)
- Antonio Ferrigno (1863–1940)
- Domenico Fetti (1589–1623)
- Domenico Fiasella (1589–1669)
- Marcello Figolino (fl. 15th century)
- Francesco Filippini (1853–1895)
- Alessandro Filipponi (1909–1931)
- Ugo Flumiani (1876–1938)
- Stefano Folchetti (fl. 15th–16th centuries)
- Lavinia Fontana (1552–1614)
- Michele Foschini (1711–c. 1770)
- Vincenzo Foppa (1430–1515)
- Francesco de' Franceschi (fl. 15th century)
- Marcantonio Franceschini (1648–1729)
- Francesco Francia (1447–1517)
- Giorgio Fuentes (1756–1821)
- Bernardino Fungai (1460–1516)

== G ==
- Agnolo Gaddi (1350–1396)
- Taddeo Gaddi (c. 1300–1366)
- Enrico Gamba (1831–1883)
- Francesco Gamba (1818–1887)
- Lattanzio Gambara (c. 1530–1574)
- Salvatore Garau (born 1953)
- Enrico Garff (born 1939)
- Domenico Gargiulo aka Micco Spadaro (1609–1610–c. 1675)
- Bartolomeo Gennari (1594–1661)
- Gentile da Fabriano (c. 1370–1427)
- Artemisia Gentileschi (1593–1652)
- Orazio Gentileschi (1563–1639)
- Tommaso Gherardini (1715–1797)
- Davide Ghirlandaio (1452–1525)
- Domenico Ghirlandaio (1449–1494)
- Ridolfo Ghirlandaio (1483–1561)
- Giampietrino (c. 1495–1549)
- Pietro di Giampietro (1709–after 1750)
- Bartolomeo Giangolini (c. 1560–1640)
- Corrado Giaquinto (1703–1765)
- Giacinto Gilioli (1594–1665)
- Camillo Gioja Barbera (fl. 19th century)
- Luca Giordano (1634–1705)
- Giorgione (c. 1477–1510)
- Giotto (1267–1337)
- Raffaelle Giovannetti (1822–1911)
- Giovanni da Milano (fl. 1346–1369)
- Giovanni da Rimini (fl. 1292–1336)
- Giovanni d'Alemagna (1411–1450)
- Giovanni del Biondo (fl. 1356–1399)
- Giovanni di Paolo (1398–1482)
- Giovanni di ser Giovanni Guidi (1406–1486)
- Gerolamo Giovenone (1487–1555)
- Girolamo da Carpi (1501–1556)
- Giunta Pisano (1190–1258)
- Benozzo Gozzoli (1421–1497)
- il Grechetto (Giovanni Benedetto Castiglione) (1609–1664)
- Giovanni Antonio Greccolini (1675–1756)
- Giuseppe Grisoni (1699–1796)
- Francesco Guardi (1712–1793)
- Gianantonio Guardi (1699–1760)
- Guercino (1591–1666)
- Amanzia Guérillot (1828–1905)
- Camilla Guerrieri (1628–after 1693)
- Guido da Siena (1230–1290)
- Bartolomeo Guidobono (1654–1709)
- Salvatore Guidotti (1836–after 1889)
- Renato Guttuso (1911–1987)
- Giovanni Battista di Giovannofrio (fl. 15th century)

== H ==
- Francesco Hayez (1791–1882)

== I ==
- Domenico Induno (1815–1878)
- Gerolamo Induno (1825–1890)
- Innocenzo da Imola (1490–1550)

== J ==
- Jacopo del Casentino (1297–1349)

== K ==
- Cherubino Kirchmayr (1848–1903)

== L ==
- Valerico Laccetti (1836–1909)
- Giuseppe Laezza (1835–1905)
- Girolamo Lancerotti, active early 16th century
- Girolamo Lamanna (1580–1640)
- Carlo Lamparelli (fl. 1680)
- Tommaso Lancisi (1603–1682)
- Aristodemo Landi (active after 1880)
- Giovanni Lanfranco (1582–1647)
- Bernardino Lanini (1511–c.1578)
- Pietro Lauri (17th century)
- Giovanni Lavezzari (1817–1881)
- Bice Lazzari (1900–1981)
- Gregorio Lazzarini (1655–1730)
- Achille Lega (1899–1934)
- Silvestro Lega (1826–1895)
- Achille Leonardi (c. 1800–1870)
- Pietro Giovanni Leonori (fl. 1400)
- Nicola Levoli (1728–1801)
- Ernesto Levorati (fl. 1876–1898)
- Liberale da Verona (1445–1530)
- Gennesio Liberale (16th century)
- Augusto Licata (1851–1942)
- Giovanni Antonio Licinio (c. 1515–1576)
- Ulvi Liegi (1858–1939)
- Cesare Ligario (1716–c. 1755)
- Berto Linajuolo (15th century)
- Filippino Lippi (1457–1504)
- Fra Filippo Lippi (c. 1406–1469)
- Giacomo Lippi (16th century)
- Giovanni Battista Livizzani (17th century)
- Giovan Francesco Locatelli (1810–1882)
- Giovanni Agostino da Lodi (c. 1470–c. 1519)
- Giovanni Lombardo Calamia (1849–after 1894)
- Barbara Longhi (1552–1638)
- Pietro Longhi (1701–1785)
- Francesco Longo Mancini (1880–1954)
- Ambrogio Lorenzetti (fl. 1319–1348)
- Pietro Lorenzetti (1280–1348)
- Paolo de Lorenzi (1733–after 1790)
- Lorenzo di Credi (1459–1537)
- Lorenzo Monaco (1370–1425)
- Lorenzo Veneziano (fl. c.1370)
- Lorenzo Lotto (1480–1557)
- Aristide Loria (ALO)
- Vincenzo Loria (1850–1939)
- Luca di Tommè περ. (1330–1389)
- Giorgio Lucchesi (1855–1941)
- Bernardino Luini (1481–1532)

== M ==
- Raffaele Maccagnani (1841–1925)
- Angelo Maccagnino or Angelo da Siena (?–1456)
- Enrico Maccioni (born 1940)
- Macrino d'Alba (c. 1460/1465–c. 1510/1520)
- Giovanni Battista Maderni (1758–1803)
- Mario Mafai (1902–1965)
- Aimo Maggi (1756–1793)
- Alessandro Magnasco (1667–1749)
- Bastiano Mainardi (1460–1513)
- Antonio Malchiodi (1848–1915)
- Matilde Malenchini (1779–1858)
- Luigi Malice (born 1937)
- Antonio Mancini (1852–1930)
- Bartolomeo Manfredi (1582–1622)
- Giovanni Mansueti (1465–1527)
- Andrea Mantegna (c. 1431–1506)
- Giacomo Manzoni (1840–1912)
- Carlo Maratta (1625–1713)
- Luigi Marchesi (1825–1862)
- Salvatore Marchesi (1852–1926)
- Domenico Marchiori (1828–1905)
- Luigi Marengo (1928–2010)
- Margaritone d'Arezzo (fl. c. 1250–1290)
- Carlo Maria Mariani (1931–2021)
- Giovanni Maria Mariani (fl. 17th century)
- Michele Marieschi (1710–1744)
- Mauro Marrucci (1937–2014)
- Carlo Martini (1908–1958)
- Simone Martini (1284–1344)
- Bernardo Martorana (1846–after 1891)
- Angelo Martinetti (born 1830)
- Guido Marzulli (born 1943)
- Masaccio (1401–1428)
- Pietro Maselli (?–1892)
- Maso di Banco (?–1348)
- Masolino da Panicale (1383–1447)
- Maturino da Firenze (1490–1528)
- Michele Mastellari (fl. 19th century)
- Master of the Bambino Vispo (fl. early 15th century)
- Master of the Osservanza Triptych (fl. 1425–1450)
- Luca di Paolo da Matelica (1435/1441–1491)
- Paolo de Matteis (c. 1662–1728)
- Filippo Mazzola (1460–1505)
- Ludovico Mazzolino (1480–c. 1528)
- Federico Mazzotta (1839–1897)
- Carla Carli Mazzucato (born 1935)
- Pier Francesco Mazzucchelli "il Morazzone" (1573–1626)
- Master of the Bambino Vispo (fl. early 15th century)
- Antonio Melchioni (1847–1921)
- Melozzo da Forlì (1438–1494)
- Francesco Melzi (1491–1568/70)
- Lippo Memmi (?–1356)
- Vincenzo Meucci (1694–1766)
- Michelangelo (1475–1564)
- Vincenzo Milione (1735–1805)
- Angelo Minghetti (1822–1885)
- Mino di Graziano (1289–1323)
- Eraclio Minozzi (1847–after 1909)
- Amedeo Modigliani (1884–1920)
- Mauro Modin (born 1963)
- Achille Mollica (1832–1885)
- Francesco Monachesi (1817–?)
- Bartolomeo Montagna (1450–1523)
- Jacopo da Montagnana (1440–1499)
- Matteo Montani (born 1972)
- Francesco Monteverde (fl. 19th century)
- Paolo Moranda Cavazzola (1486–1522)
- Giorgio Morandi (1890–1964)
- Domenico Morani (1813–1870)
- Domenico Morelli (1823–1901)
- Moretto da Brescia (c. 1498–1554)
- Emma Moretto (fl. 19th century)
- Giovan Battista Moroni (1522–1579)
- Tulio Moy (1856–1894)
- Carlo Muccioli (1857–1931)
- Quirizio di Giovanni da Murano (fl. 1460–1478)

== N ==
- Francesco Nagar (1861–?)
- Nardo di Cione (died 1366)
- Girolamo Nattino (1842–1913)
- Edoardo Navone (1844–1912)
- Guglielmo Navorelli (1865–1916)
- Ottaviano Nelli (1375–1444)
- Neri di Bicci (1418/1420–1492)
- Neroccio de' Landi (1447–1500)
- Luciano Nezzo (1856–1903)
- Niccolò di Liberatore (l'Alunno) (1430–1502)
- Francesco Noro (1871–1947)
- Emilio Notti (1891–1982)
- Pietro Novelli (1603–1647)
- Allegretto Nuzi (1315–1373)

== O ==
- Marco d'Oggiono (c. 1470–c. 1549)
- Orcagna (Andrea di Cione) (1310–1368)
- Giuseppe Oriolo (1681–1750)
- Lelio Orsi (1511–1587)
- Pietro di Niccolò da Orvieto (1430–1484)

== P ==
- Pacino di Buonaguida (1280–1340)
- Paolo Pagani (1655–1716)
- Tiziano Pagan De Paganis (1858–1932)
- Luigi Pagano (19th-century)
- Arturo Pagliai (1852–1896)
- Eleuterio Pagliano (1826–1903)
- Giovanni Battista Pagliari (1741–1816)
- Gioacchino Pagliei (1852–1896)
- Arcangela Paladini (1599–1622)
- Gaetano Palazzi (1832–1892)
- Palma il Giovane (1548/1550–1628)
- Palma il Vecchio (1480–1528)
- Marco Palmezzano (1460–1539)
- Catello Palmigiano (1853–1883)
- Ignazio Paluselli (1744–1779)
- Giovanni Paolo Panini (1691–1765)
- Sebastiano Panunzi (1845–1924)
- Luigi Paoletti Vinea (active 1867–1890)
- Paolo Veneziano (1300–1365)
- Alessandro Papetti (born 1958)
- Napoleone Parisani (1854–1932)
- Parmigianino (1503–1540)
- Ferdinando Partini (active 1790s)
- Angelo Pascal (1858–1888)
- Luigia Pascoli (1805–1882)
- Pasquarosa (1896–1973)
- Bartolomeo Passarotti (1529–1592)
- Domenico Passignano (1559–1638)
- Ludovico Passini (1832–1902)
- Girolamo Pastore (fl. late 19th century)
- Giovanni Patrone (1847–?)
- Federigo Pedulli (1860– after 1938)
- Giovanni Antonio Pellegrini (1675–1741)
- Maurizio Pellegrini (1866–?)
- Itala Pellegrino (1865–?)
- Giuseppe Pellizza da Volpedo (1868–1907)
- Odoardo Perini (1671–1757)
- Pietro Perugino (c. 1445–1523)
- Simone Peterzano (1535–1599)
- Filiberto Petiti (1845–1924)
- Vincenzo Petrocelli (1825–1896)
- Umberto Pettinicchio (born 1943)
- Pietro Pezzati (1828–1890)
- Baldassare Peruzzi (1481–1536)
- Pesellino (1422–1457)
- Luigi Petri (1860–1911)
- Giovanni Philippone (1922–1993)
- Giovanni Piancastelli (1845–1926)
- Ulisse Pichi (1867–1925)
- Piero della Francesca (c. 1416–1492)
- Piero di Cosimo (1462–1522)
- Giovanni Battista Piazzetta (1683–1754)
- Giovanni Picca (1840–1910)
- Nicola di Pietro (fl. 14th century)
- Domenico Piola (1627–1703)
- Pinturicchio (1454–1513)
- Sebastiano del Piombo (c. 1485–1547)
- Fausto Pirandello (1899–1975)
- Giuseppe Pirovani (c. 1755–c. 1835)
- Pisanello (1395–1455)
- Michelangelo Pittatore (1825–1903)
- Giambattista Pittoni (1687–1767)
- Karl Plattner (1919–1986)
- Plinio Plini (fl. late 19th century)
- Pietro Policastrelli (fl. 19th century)
- Antonio del Pollaiuolo (c. 1429/1433–1498)
- Piero del Pollaiuolo (1443–1496)
- Giovanni Pietro de Pomis (c.1565–1633)
- Giovanni dal Ponte (1385–1438)
- Pontormo (1494–1556)
- Antonio Porcelli (1800–1870)
- Ferdinando Porcia (1835–1896)
- Francesco Porcia (1531–1612)
- il Pordenone (1483–1539)
- Gregorio Porideo (fl. 16th century)
- Daniello Porri (fl. 16th century)
- Aniello Portio (fl. 1690–1700)
- Andrea Pozzo (1642–1709)
- Alessandro Prampolino (1827–1865)
- Ranunzio Prata (fl. 1635)
- Luigi Premazzi (1814–1891)
- Mattia Preti (1613–1699)
- Pier Francesco Prina (fl. 18th century)
- Rinaldo Priora (1864–1942)
- Giulio Cesare Procaccini (1574–1625)
- Stefano Provenzali (fl. 17th century)
- Mario Puccini (1869–1920)
- Antonio Puglicochi (fl. 17th century)
- Luigi Pulini (fl. 19th century)

== Q ==
- Giovanni Battista Quadrone (1844–1898)
- Raffaele Quattrucci (active 1880s)

== R ==
- Prospero Rabaglio (fl. 16th century)
- Raffaele Rabbia (fl. 1610)
- Ambrogio Raffaele (1845–1928)
- Elviro Raimondi (1867–?)
- Domenico Rainaldi (fl. 1665)
- Giovanni Battista Ramacciotti (fl. 17th century)
- Serafino Ramazzotti (1846–1920)
- Laudadio Rambaldo (fl. 1386)
- Raphael (1483–1520)
- Giovanni Ottavio Rappetti (1849–1931)
- Roberto Rasinelli (c. 1840–1910)
- Federigo Reale (1862–?)
- Francesco Redenti (1820–1876)
- Tommaso Redi (1665–1726)
- Bernardo Regoliron (fl. 18th century)
- Eugenio Renazzi (1863–1914)
- Guido Reni (1575–1642)
- Cesare Reverdino (fl. 1531–1564)
- Angelo Ribossi (1822–1886)
- Prospero Ricca (1838–1895)
- Marco Ricchiedeo (fl. 16th century)
- Giovanni Battista Ricci (1537–1627)
- Pio Ricci (1850–1919)
- Sebastiano Ricci (1659–1734)
- Antonio Riccianti (fl. 17th century)
- Ernesto Rigamonti (1864–1942)
- Antonio Rinaldo (1816–1875)
- Galeazzo Rivelli (fl. 14th century)
- Ercole de' Roberti (1451–1496)
- Marietta Robusti (c. 1560–1590)
- Fortunato Rocchi (1822–1909)
- Pietro Ròi (1819–1896)
- Romanino (1485–1566)
- Giulio Romano (1499–1546)
- Alessandro Rontini (1854–1933)
- Luigi Rosa (1850–1919)
- Salvator Rosa (1615–1673)
- Cosimo Rosselli (1439–after 1506)
- Rosso Fiorentino (1494–1540)
- Antonio Rotta (1828–1903)
- Guido Ruggeri (fl. c. 1550s)
- Pasquale Ruggiero (1851–1915)
- Benedetto Rusconi "il Diana" (1460–1525)
- Clemente Ruta (1668–1767)
- Pietro Ruzolone (died 1517)

== S ==
- Lorenzo Sabatini (1530–1576)
- Andrea Sacchi (1599–1661)
- Francesco Sagliano (1826–1890)
- Giorgio Salmoiraghi (1936–2022)
- Francesco Sampietro (1815–1896)
- Marco Sammartino (fl. 17th century)
- Alessandro Sani (1856–1927)
- David Sani (1828–1914)
- Domingo Maria Sanni (fl. 18th century)
- Sano di Pietro (1406–1481)
- Fabrizio Santafede (1560–1623/28)
- Santi di Tito (1536–1603)
- Giovanni Santi (1435–1494)
- Girolamo Santo (fl. 16th century)
- Carlo Saraceni (1579–1620)
- Giuseppe Sartori (1863–1922)
- Andrea del Sarto (1486–1530)
- Sassetta, Stefano di Giovanni (1392–1450)
- Giovanni Battista Salvi da Sassoferrato (1609–1685)
- Alfonso Savini (1836–1908)
- Girolamo Savoldo (1480–after 1548)
- Bartolomeo Scapuzzi (1750–?)
- Camillo Scaramuzza (1843–1915)
- Francesco Scarpinato (1840–1895)
- Bartolomeo Schedoni (1578–1615)
- Alessandro Scorzoni (1858–1933)
- Enrico Scotta (born 1949)
- Felice Scotto (fl. early 15th century)
- Andrea Scutellari (fl. 16th century)
- Antonino Sartini (1889–1954)
- Luigi Scaffai (1837–1899)
- Scipione (Gino Bonichi) (1904–1933)
- Giovanni Segantini (1858–1899)
- Jacopo da Sellaio (1441–1493)
- Giacomo di Ser Michele (fl. early 15th century)
- Luigi Serena (1855–1911)
- Baldo De' Serofini (fl. 15th century)
- Ernesto Serra (1860–1915)
- Andrea Sguazella (fl. 16th century)
- Luca Signorelli (1445–1523)
- Telemaco Signorini (1835–1901)
- Nicola Simbari (1927–2012)
- Salvatore Simoncini (fl. late 19th century)
- Simone dei Crocifissi (1330–1399)
- Mario Sironi (1885–1961)
- Sodoma (1477–1549)
- Achille Solari (1835–1884)
- Andrea Solari (c. 1465–1524)
- Giuseppe Solenghi (1879–1944)
- Francesco Solimena (1657–1747)
- Domenico Someda (1859–1944)
- Napoleone Sommaruga (1848–1906)
- Lionello Spada (1576–1622)
- Micco Spadaro aka Domenico Gargiulo (1609/1610–c. 1675)
- Giovanni Martino Spanzotti (1455–1528)
- Spinello Aretino (1350–1410)
- Mario Spinetti (1848–1925)
- Francesco Squarcione (c. 1395–1468)
- Giovanni Stanchi (1608–c. 1675)
- Gherardo Starnina (1354–1413)
- Stefano da Verona (1379–1438)
- Attilio Stefanori (1860–1911)
- Luigi Steffani (1828–1898)
- Augusto Stoppoloni (1855–1936)
- Bernardo Strozzi (1581–1644)

== T ==
- Francesco Tacconi (fl. 15th century)
- Taddeo di Bartolo (1363–1422)
- Spurius Tadius (fl. 1st century BC and 1st century AD)
- Francesco Tartagnini (fl. 18th century)
- Giovanni Temini (fl. 1622)
- Giuseppe Raffaele Tessitore (1861–after 1916)
- Giovanni Battista Tiepolo (1696–1770)
- Giovanni Domenico Tiepolo (1727–1804)
- Bartolomeo del Tintore (fl. 15th century)
- Tintoretto (1518–1594)
- Benvenuto Tisi (il Garofalo) (1481–1559)
- Titian (1488–1576)
- Antonio Tognone (fl. 16th century)
- Giulio Tonduzzi (c. 1513–c.1583)
- Leopoldo Toniolo (1833–1908)
- Enea Tornaghi (1830–after 1885)
- Francesco Saverio Torcia (1840–1891)
- Bartolommeo Torre (fl. 17th century)
- Francesco Traballesi (1541–1588)
- Gaspare Traversi (1722–1770)
- Giacomo Trécourt (1812–1882)
- Euclide Trotti (fl. 16th century)
- Giovanni Maria Tucci (fl. 1542)
- Cosimo Tura (c. 1430–1495)

== U ==
- Paolo Uccello (c. 1396–1475)
- Ugolino di Nerio (1280–1335)

== V ==
- Perino del Vaga (1501–1547)
- Andrea Vanni (1332–c. 1414)
- Tanzio da Varallo (c. 1575/1580–c. 1632/1633)
- Giorgio Vasari (1511–1574)
- Francesco Veau (1727–1768)
- Giovanni de' Vecchi (1536–1614)
- Benedetto Velli (fl. 17th century)
- Giovanni Vendramini (1769–1839)
- Giuseppe Vermiglio (1585–1635)
- Filippo da Verona (fl. 1509–1514)
- Niccolò Da Verona (fl. 15th century)
- Paolo Veronese (1528–1588)
- Andrea del Verrocchio (c. 1435–1488)
- Pasquale Verrusio (1935–2012)
- Giulio Versorese (1868–?)
- Francesco Vicentino (fl. 16th century)
- Leonardo da Vinci (1452–1519)
- Lauretta Vinciarelli (1943–2011)
- Jacopo Vignali (1592–1664)
- Vitale da Bologna (1300–1360)
- Francesco Vitalini (1865–1904)
- Matteo di Vittore (fl. 16th century)
- Bernardino Vitulini (c. 1350)
- Alvise Vivarini (1442/53–1505)
- Antonio Vivarini (1418–1476/84)
- Bartolomeo Vivarini (1430–1491)
- Antonio Diego Voci (1920–1985)
- Vincenzo Volpe (1855–1929)
- Augusto Volpini (1832–1911/1923)
- Giovanni Battista di Pietro di Stefano Volponi (fl. 16th century)

== W ==
- Carlo Wostry (1865–1943)

== Z ==
- Alessandro Zaffonato (fl. 1730)
- Domenico Zampieri (1581–1641)
- Federico Zandomeneghi (1841–1917)
- Giuseppe Miti Zanetti (1859–1929)
- Sergio Zanni (born 1942)
- Bernardo Zenale (c. 1460–1526)
- Domenico Zindato (born 1966)
- Antonio Zoppi (1860–1926)
- Marco Zoppo (1433–1498)
- Francesco Zuccarelli (1702–1789)
- Federico Zuccari (1542–1609)
- Francesco Zugno (1709–1787)

== See also ==
- List of Italians
- List of Milanese painters
