= Tessitore =

Tessitore is an Italian surname. Notable people with the surname include:

- Andrea Tessitore (born 1973), Italian lawyer and entrepreneur
- Giuseppe Raffaele Tessitore (1861–1916), Italian painter
- Joe Tessitore (born 1971), American sportscaster
