= Partini (disambiguation) =

The Partini were an Illyrian tribe that lived in the inlands of southern Illyria.

Partini may also refer to:

- Giuseppe Partini (1842–1895), Italian architect
- Ferdinando Partini, Italian painter
