= Tornaghi =

Tornaghi is an Italian surname. Notable people with the surname include:

- Alessia Tornaghi (born 2003), Italian figure skater
- Enea Tornaghi (1830–after 1885), Italian painter
- Paolo Tornaghi (born 1988), Italian footballer
