= Giuseppe Calcia =

Italian painter

Giuseppe Calcia (active 1725) (also called Il Genovesino) was an Italian painter, born in the Piedmont. He should not be confused with the Milanese painter Marco Genovesini. Giuseppe painted altar-pieces for the churches of Turin and Alessandria. He painted a ' St. Dominic' and ' St. Thomas Aquinas ' for the church of the Dominicans at Turin.
