= Pietro Adami =

Italian painter

Pietro Adami was an Italian painter of coastal and marine views or vedute, active around the year 1730.
