= Ernesto Rigamonti =

Italian painter (1864–1942)

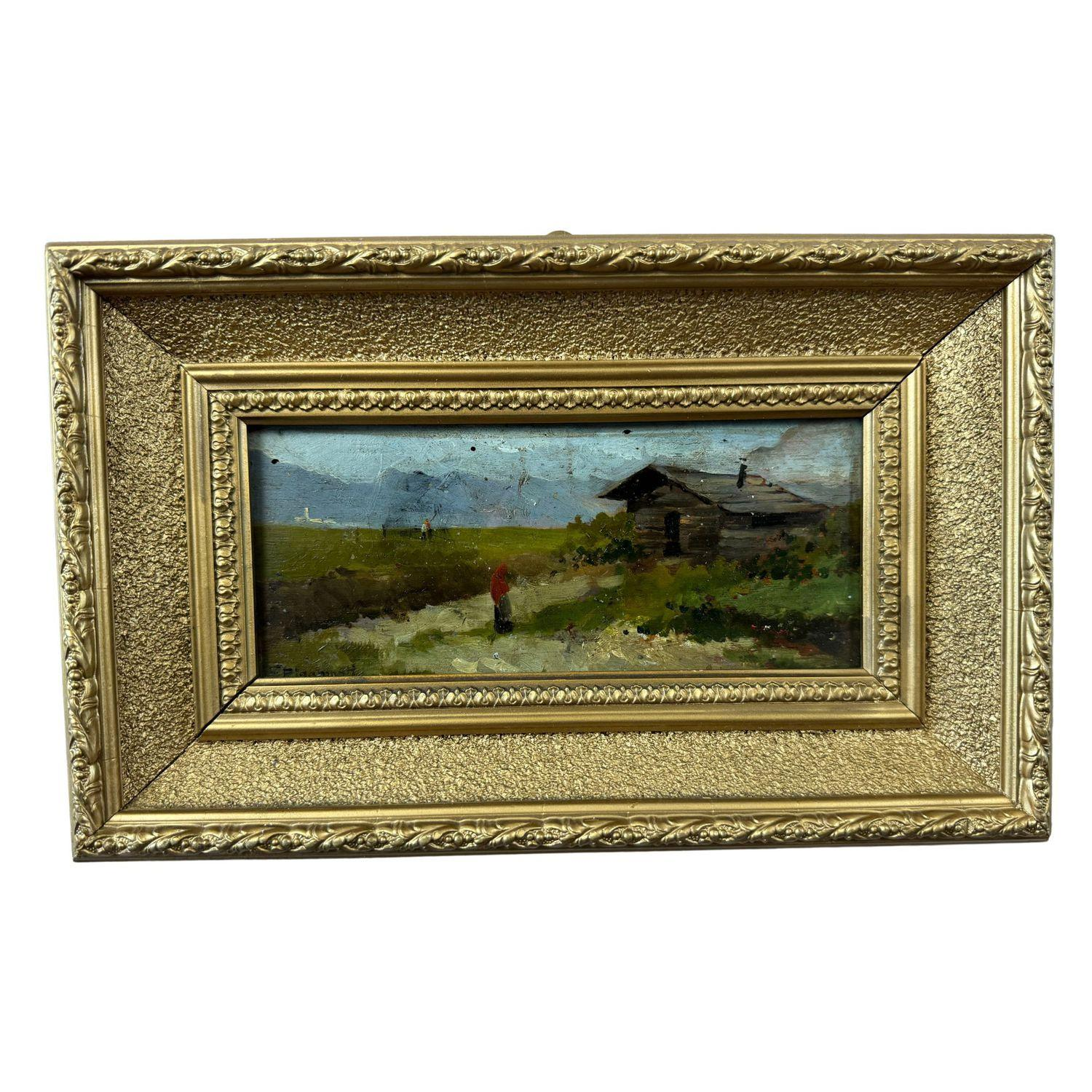
Oil painting on board by Rigamonti

Ernesto Rigamonti (1864–1942) was an Italian painter.

He was born in Milan and made his career there. He exhibited in 1883 in Milan: Rosso di sera Bel dì, si spera and Rustico; in 1884 at Turin, Le frutta dell' orto. At the 1891 Exposition triennale of the Brera Academy, he exhibited Interno studio dal vero and a landscape titled Il Gorgazzo a Poicenico.
