= Cesare Balbi di Robecco =

Italian painter (1854-1939)

Cesare Balbi di Robecco (1854–1939) was an Italian painter, mainly of landscapes and seascapes.

== Bibliography ==
He was born in Alessandria to an aristocratic Piedmontese family. He worked often in Liguria, living for some years in Sestri Levante. In 1887 he exhibited the painting Mare in the Venice Exposition. In 1881 at the Exhibition of Milan, he sent Il Treno ferroviario, La calma, and Un tramonto. But these latter paintings were also sent under the title Libeccio and Fossa dell'uomo. In 1886, he sent to the Exhibition of Fine Arts of Milan, and two works depicting Tempo Grigio and Giorno di bucato; these had also been sent in 1884 to the Exhibition of Turin. In 1875, he sent to the Turin Promotrice two canvases: Un pastore and Un cacciatore. He died in Genoa.
