= Domenico Zindato =

Italian self-taught artist and draftsman (born 1966)

Domenico Zindato (born 1966) is an Italian self-taught artist and draftsman who currently resides in Cuernevaca, Mexico.

== Biography ==
Domenico Zindato was born in 1966 in the southern Italian town of Reggio in Calabria province. He briefly studied law in Rome at La Sapienza University, before changing his focus to theater and cinema studies. After moving briefly to Milan, Zindato relocated to Berlin in 1988.

While in Berlin, Zindato continued to explore his interests in theater, music and performance and establish his own artistic identity. While managing a disco he also hosted his own cabaret-like performance that he describes as being influenced by Dada and Surrealism. After leaving Europe, he traveled throughout Mexico, settling in the capital Mexico City, and then later in Cuernavaca.

== Work ==
Zindato’s work is difficult to pin down into a predefined category, though he is often linked to the outsider-art, self-taught contemporary art fields. He has been represented and shown by galleries in New York, Paris, Berlin, Italy and Mexico City.
