= Alessandro Rontini =

Italian painter (1854–1933)

Alessandro Rontini (April 5, 1854 – 1933) was an Italian painter, mainly indoor (scena intime) genre paintings, depicting children and women.

He lived and worked in his native Florence. His brother Augusto and his son Ferrucio (1893–1964) were also painters. In 1880 at Florence, he displayed Il paracadute; and at the Exhibition of Turin, Innocent Love. Other works include Amore ingenuo e the disturbatore and Scherzi materni. At 1886 in Livorno, he displayed In giardino; Amore ingenuo, and Head of bambina. At the 1887 Exposition in Venice, he displayed Primavera.
