= Pio Ricci =

Italian painter (1850–1919)

Pio Ricci (c. 1850 – August 21, 1919) was an Italian painter, mainly of genre and costume genre works.

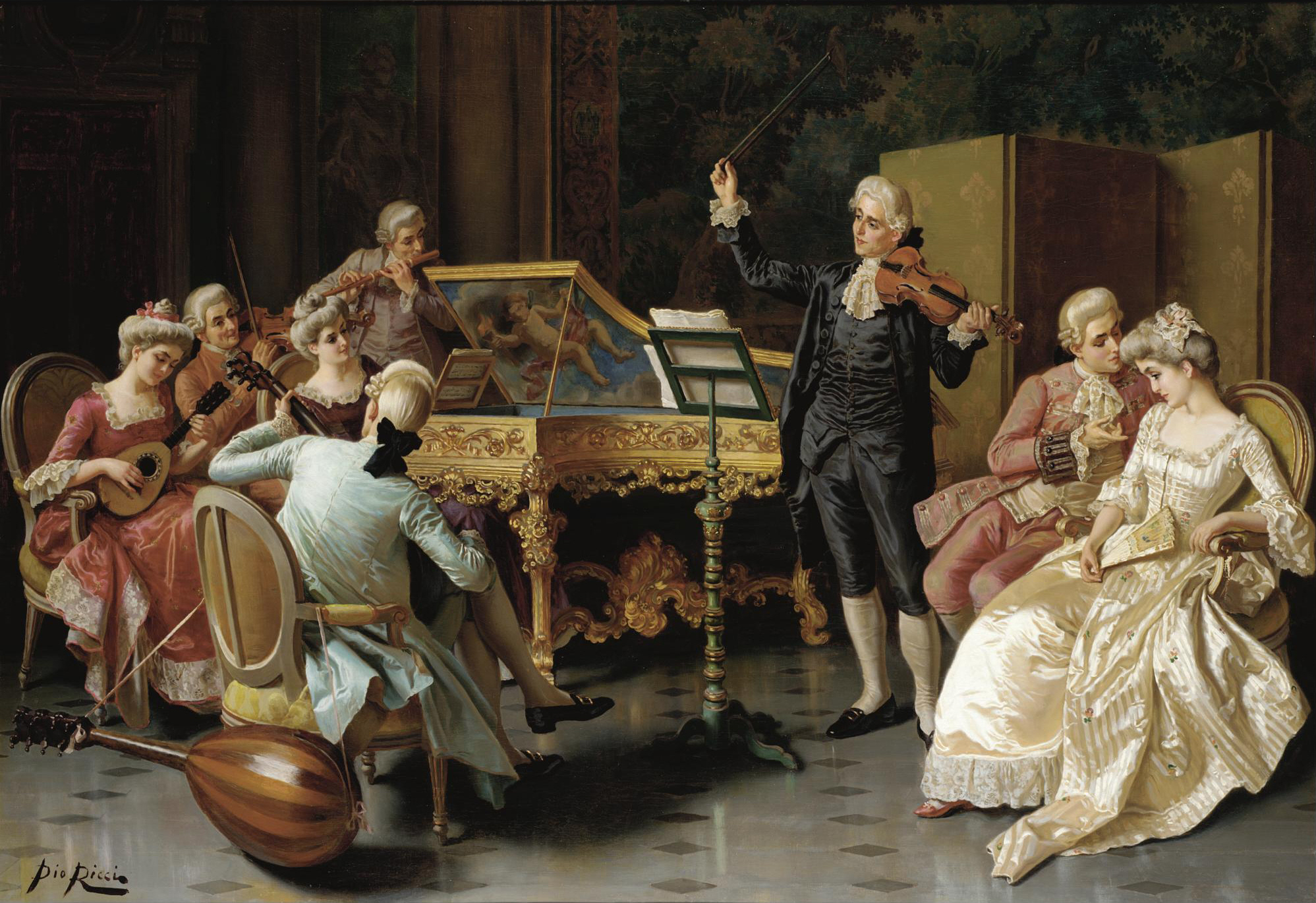
A Private Performance

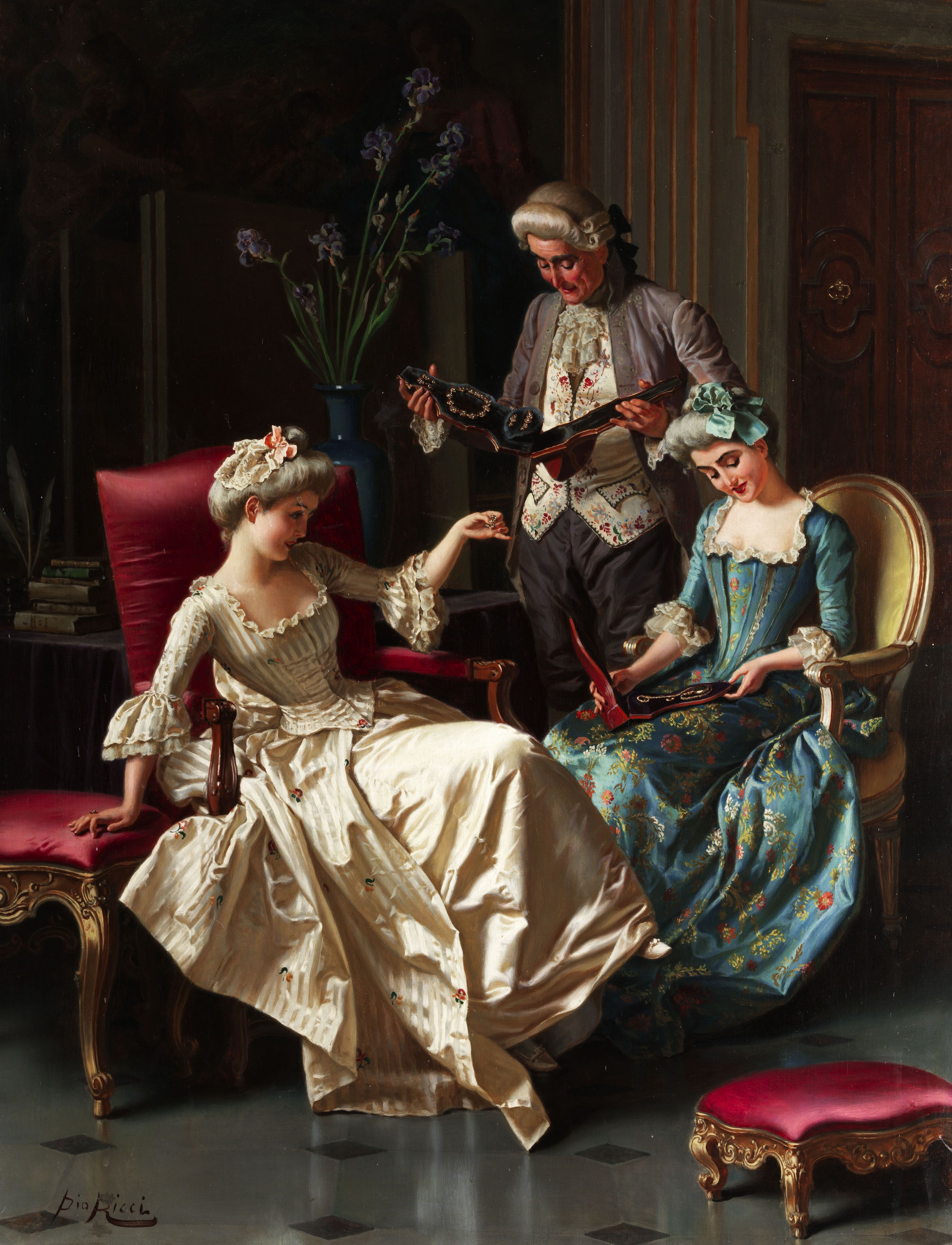
Admiring the Gift

== Biography ==
He was born in Florence, Grand Duchy of Tuscany, where he studied at the Academy of Fine Arts. Among the works are a Ritratto dell'erede, exhibited at Turin in 1880; L' Applauso; La lezione di Musica; La Confidente; Gli Scorrucciati; L' Addio; L' Ora of the passeggiata; Non mi vuoi più bene?; Una visita agli sposini; Lezione di musica; Un secreto, and In campagna exhibited at the Promotrice of Florence. Also among his works: Cosa le dirò?; Regalo all' amante; Il regalo di un fiore; La prima dichiarazione d'amore; Aranti il tornèo; Sempre insieme; La lettera compromettente; Un rumore improvviso; Prima lezione di chitarra; and L'onomastico of the padrona.
