= Prospero Rabaglio =

Italian painter

Prospero Rabaglio (late 16th century) was an Italian painter. He was born in Brescia. There is an altarpiece by him in the church of the Capuchins in that city, dated 1588.
