= Raffaele Quattrucci =

Italian painter

Raffaele Quattrucci (Arce, Province of Frosinone) was an Italian painter, depicting genre subjects and portraits. He also began to paint in the 1880s Neo-Pompeian and Orientalist subjects.

== Biography ==
He was a resident of Roma. Quattrucci exhibited In 1881 at Milan, he exhibited a Costume di fanciulla romana and Studio di vecchio, and at Rome in 1883: Al bagno and Prima del bagno.
