= Francesco Denanto =

Francesco Denanto (also referred to as Francesco de Nanto and Francesco de Nempto) was an Italian woodcutter of the Renaissance period.

He was born in Savoy, but worked in Rome in the 1520s. This is known as a result of two notarial acts signed by Denanto in Rome - one from 6 January 1524, and a later copy from the end of 1524 or early 1525. There is no evidence, however, that he ever worked for Titian.

One set of woodcuts completed by Denanto was a series on the life of Jesus. He obviously worked with Girolamo da Treviso whose name is indicated on two prints. Depaulis lists 21 actual prints by Francesco Denanto, of which impressions of 17 are kept in the British Museum. It is known that Ferdinand Columbus also owned some more prints by Denanto, which have not been preserved, save one or two. Michael Bury, in analysing the notarial acts signed by Denanto, has suggested that the artist may have completed at least 50 woodblocks before his arrival in Rome.
