= Giovanni Picca =

Italian painter (1840–1910)

Giovanni Picca (14 February 1840 – 1910) was an Italian painter and scenographer.

== Biography ==
He was born and resident at Ascoli Piceno. He studied while very young in Rome and other places. He has painted scenes for many theaters, among them the Teatro Ventidio Basso of Ascoli, and the theaters of Foligno and Perugia. He also has worked in the decoration of palace ceilings and walls, including the ceiling of the vestibule in the Theater of Monte Giorgio. He painted the frescoes of the Caffè Meletti in Ascoli Piceno.
