= Marco Sammartino =

Italian painter

Marco Sammartino was a late 17th-century Italian painter and etcher of the Baroque period. He painted Baptism of Constantine and St. John the Baptist preaching for the cathedral at Rimini. He also has a painting at Basilica dei Santi Giovanni e Paolo (Venice).
