= Antonio Riccianti =

Italian painter

Antonio Riccianti was an Italian painter of the 17th century. He practised in Florence and neighboring towns, and was a pupil of Vincenzo Dandini.
