= Giorgio Lucchesi =

Italian painter (1855–1941)

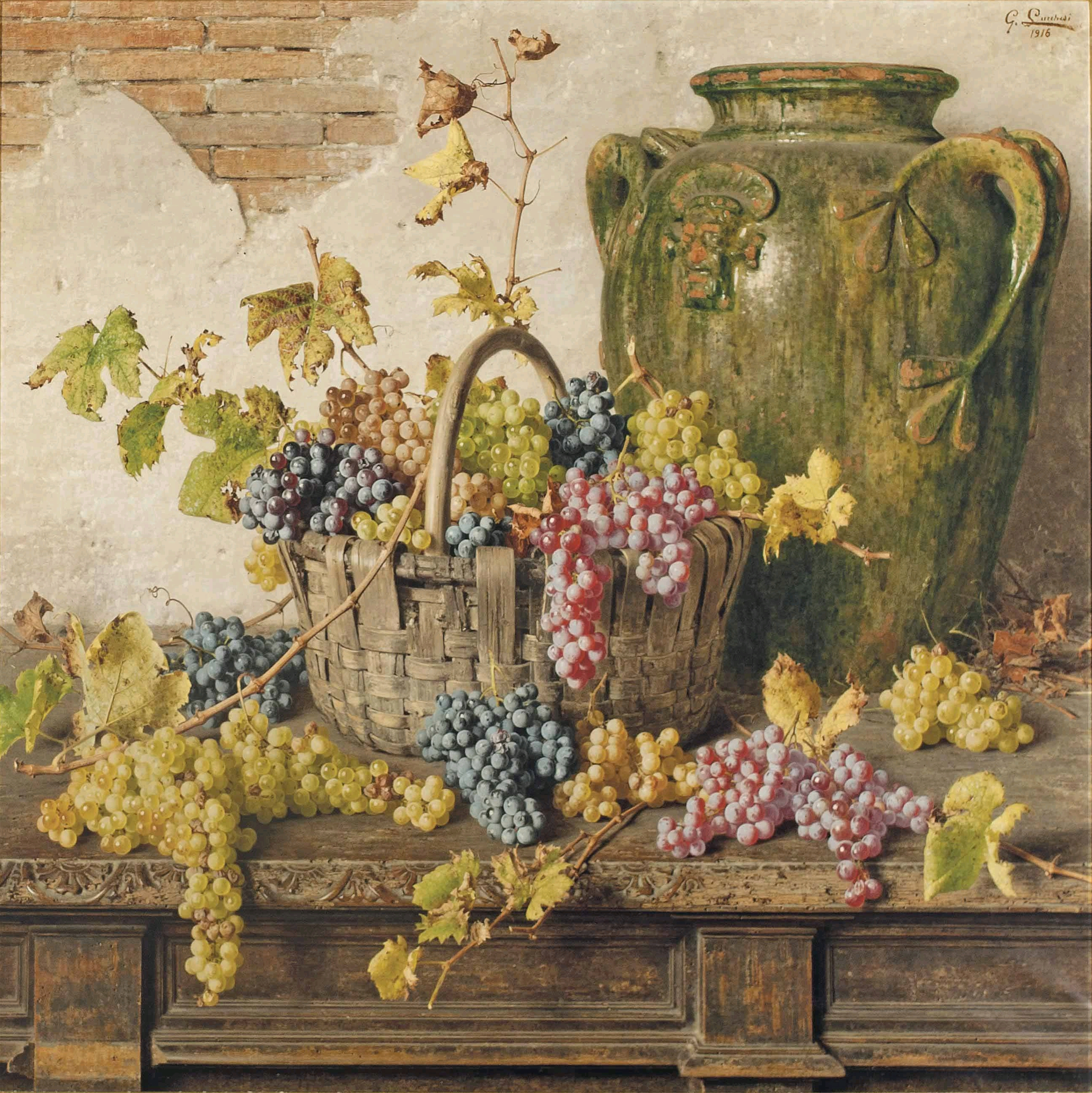
Giorgio Lucchesi: Still Life, 1916

Giorgio Lucchesi (Lucca, 1855 – 1941) was an Italian painter. While initially he painted mainly painting figures and landscapes; after the 1880s he began to paint still-lives, but later of game, and then of rural agricultural scenes.

== Biography ==
He studied in the Academy of Fine Arts of Lucca under Luigi Norfini. His personality was reserved and solitary. He remained a resident of Lucca. He displayed in Rome in 1883, Giorno di Pasqua and Grappoli d'uva; at Turin in 1884: Charitas; La Pasqua dei povero; After the Vendemmia. At Venice in 1887: La novella of the nonna; Sosta; Semprevivi; Grappoli d'uva.

He refused the appointment as Director of the Institute of Arts of Lucca, offered in 1900 but did participate in the City Commission for Conservation of Monuments, and was an associate of the Lucchese Academy of Science, Arts, and Letters.
