= Girolamo Lancerotti =

Italian painter

Girolamo Lancerotti (fl. early 1600s) was an Italian painter, active mainly in the Veneto. He was born at Verona, and is best known for an altarpiece of St Jerome in Santa Maria Consolatrice and frescoes in the chapel of St Sebastian de'Gesuiti in Venice. He painted in the style of Paolo Veronese.
