= Fra Simone da Carnuli =

Italian painter

Fra Simone da Carnuli (born 15th century) was a (Genoese) painter. He was a Franciscan friar of Genoa. He painted several pictures for his convent, two of which are dated 1519, representing the Last Supper and Preaching of St. Anthony. He painted architectural designs and bird's-eye views with figures seen from an aerial perspective.
