= Giorgio Fuentes =

Italian painter (1756–1821)

Giorgio Fuentes (1756–1821) was a painter and stage designer of the Neoclassic period. He was born in Milan, studied under Pietro Gonzaga at the Milan Academy of Fine Arts, and distinguished himself as a painter of decorations in La Scala at Milan, the stage at Frankfurt (1796–1805), and for the Grand Opera in Paris. He died in Milan in 1821.
