= Antonio Rinaldo =

Italian-Swiss painter (1816–1875)

- Born: 1816; Tremona, Switzerland
- Died: September 27, 1875 (aged 58–59)

Antonio Rinaldo (1816 – 27 September 1875) was an Italian-Swiss painter. Born in Tremona, Switzerland, he painted mainly genre subjects, but also religious subjects.

== Biography ==
He was a resident and active in the Veneto region, in the Canton of Ticino, and neighboring Lombardy. At Turin in 1880, he displayed il birichino of Venice; L'Orfanelici; In inverno (genre scene). In 1881 at Milan, Pescirendola; Bottena; Fruttatelo; Lesi a pian che non te senta and the same year at Venice, Il mio tesoro; Pescivendolo; No ghe ze pià acqua; In riposo. Visita ai Carotti; Venezia Ad un appuntamento; Prima del Bagnowere exhibited at Turin. Among other works: Il mio moroso; Ritorno dal babbo; In carnevale; Al Garanghello, Banchetto popolare Veniceno). In 1887 at Venice, one of his works was exhibited: Barche peschereccie.
