= Giovanni Battista Ramacciotti =

Italian painter

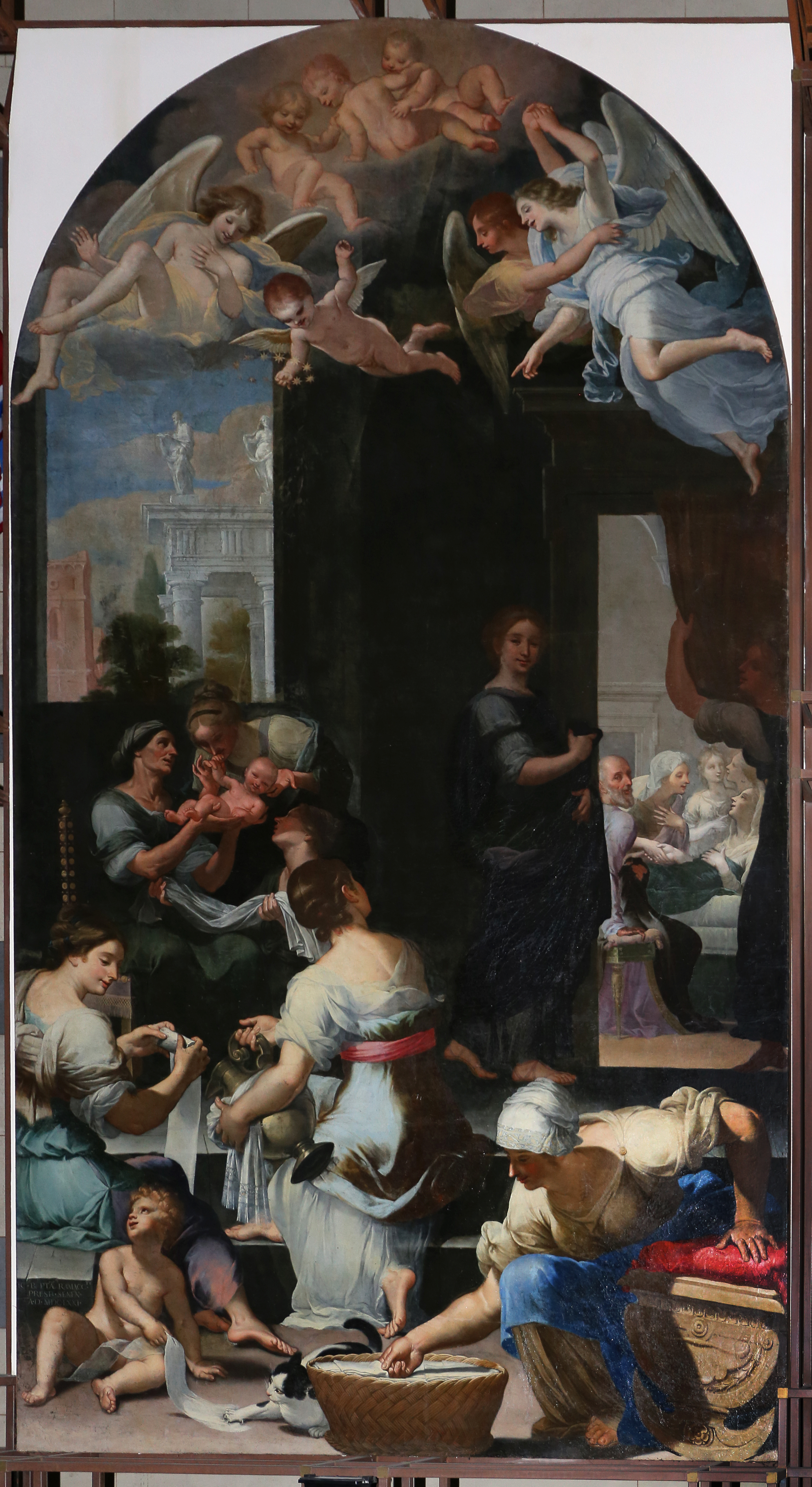
Painting in San Francesco, Siena

Giovanni Battista Ramacciotti was an Italian painter of the Baroque period, as well as an engraver and priest, active in Siena.

He was a priest of Siena, who lived about the middle of the 17th century, and practised portrait and historical painting. In the Franciscan church at Siena there is a Nativity by him, and at the Uffizi in Florence, a Birth of the Virgin. Cornelis Bloemaert II engraved after him the portrait of a Nun, Colomba da Tofaninis.
