= Vittorio Avanzi =

Italian painter

Vittorio Avanzi (February 21, 1850 – August 7, 1913) was an Italian painter, mainly of landscapes.

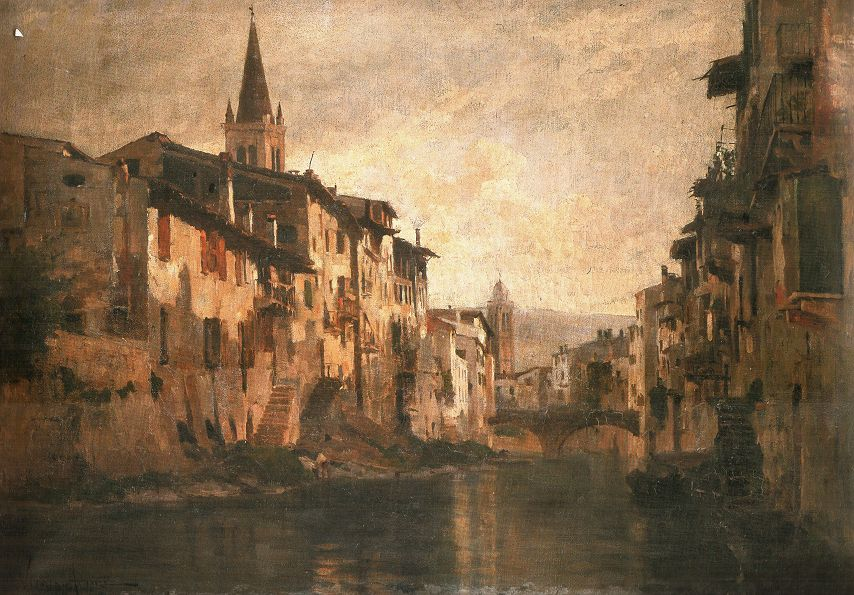
Il Canale dell'Acqua Morta of Verona, Museum of Castelvecchio.

Born in Verona, he studied at the Academy in Munich, Bavaria. He exhibited at the exhibition of Venice in 1887, 1897, and 1899. He died in Campofontana. Among his paintings are:

- Prima della pioggia
- Le vicinanze di Dachau (village of Bavaria)
- Nelle vicinanze dell' Isaar
- La marina di Capri
- Le prime foglie
