= Augusto Volpini =

Italian painter

Augusto Volpini (1832 – 1911 or 1923) was an Italian painter of mainly genre paintings and portraits.

He was born in Livorno, and initially trained with the Livornese painter Giovanni Bartolena. Among his works are Varietà, Daydreaming child, and Il colpo di grazia. In 1886 at Livorno, he exhibited Una mosca simpatica. At the 1886 Promotrici of Florence, he exhibited Studio; in 1887, Odalisca; and in 1889, Povera madre! and a Portrait of Carlotta Cordarf. He became professor and curator of the local academy.
