= Paolo de Lorenzi =

Italian painter

Paolo de Lorenzi (1733 – after 1790) was an Italian painter of the late Baroque period. A native of Ceneda, Republic of Venice. He was a pupil of Giovanni Battista Bellucci and Piazzetta. He became progressively blind.
