= Bartolommeo Torre =

Italian painter

Bartolommeo Torre was an Italian fresco painter of Arezzo, who active c. the beginning of the 17th century, and died young.

== Bibliography ==
- Bryan, Michael (1889). Walter Armstrong & Robert Edmund Graves (ed.). Dictionary of Painters and Engravers, Biographical and Critical. Vol. II L-Z. London: George Bell and Sons. p. 580.
