= Vincenzo Loria =

Italian painter

Vincenzo Loria (September 4, 1850 – 1939) was an Italian painter, active mainly as a watercolor artist in Naples.

Born in Salerno, he went to Naples and studied under professor Domenico Morelli, painting genre subjects sometimes in oil, but more commonly in watercolor. He exhibited at Turin, Milan, Venice, and yearly at the Naples Promotrice. Among his works are Si va al bagno; Battesimo in costume del settecento; and Una pagina del Corano. He also made color lithographs of murals from Pompeii and Herculaneum.
