= Francesco Tartagnini =

Italian painter

Francesco Tartagnini was an Italian decorative painter of the 18th century. He died circa 1800. He is said to have trained with the brothers Bottani from Cremona, and then with Giovanni Bellavite at the Mantua Academy of Fine Arts. He helped decorate the frescoes of the church of Sant'Andrea, as well as the Palazzo D'Arco, Mantua.
