= Giuseppe Alloia =

Italian engraver and painter

Giuseppe Alloia (active c. 1750), also known as Giuseppe Alloja, Aloia, Aloya, or Aleja, was an Italian copper plate engraver and painter, working in Naples.

He engraved Statica de'Vegetabili in Neapolitan edition of 1775, and also engraved many frescoes unearthed in Herculaneum in three volumes of folios, published in 1757,1760, and 1762.

== Notes ==
- Engraving of peculiar carriage able to trave on sea and land.

== Sources ==
- Boni, Filippo de' (1852). Biografia degli artisti ovvero dizionario della vita e delle opere dei pittori, degli scultori, degli intagliatori, dei tipografi e dei musici di ogni nazione che fiorirono da'tempi più remoti sino á nostri giorni. Seconda Edizione.. Venice; Googlebooks: Presso Andrea Santini e Figlio. p. 18.
