= Bartolommeo Calomato =

Italian painter

Bartolommeo Calomato (17th century) was an Italian painter active in Venice. He was remarkable for his small genre pictures representing scenes from town and country life, enlivened with figures.
