= Arturo Pagliai =

Italian painter (1852–1896)

Arturo Pagliai (1852–1896) was an Italian painter, often painting seascapes, and vedute of port scenes. Later in life, he began to paint studies of women.

He was a resident mainly of Livorno. He exhibited frequently at the Promotrice of Florence. Among his works are: Pagliai giova ricordare: Laguna Veneta; Nice; The Marina of Nice; Scogliera; Acquaiole a Portovenere; Steamship of the American Fleet in the Port of Livorno; Veduta of the Port of Livorno; Jemmaud Bay in Britain (or Brittany), Verso Calafuria; and In attesa di carico.
