= Domenico Rainaldi =

Italian painter

Domenico Rainaldi was an Italian painter of the Baroque period, active in Rome in 1665.
