= Salvatore Simoncini =

Italian painter

Salvatore Simoncini (Late 19th century) was an Italian painter, mainly of genre themes.

He was born and resided in Palermo. Among his works were:

- Minaccia temporale (1877, Mostra Nazionale of Fine Arts in Naples, oil on canvas.)
- After Fishing (1882, Florence)
- Mount Aetna, from near Catania(1882, Florence),
- Church San Salvatore in Catania (1884, Expositions of Fine Arts, Turin)
- The mountains of the Guadagna at midday from Palermo (1884, Expositions of Fine Arts, Turin)
