= Bartolomeo Giangolini =

Italian painter (c1560–1640)

Bartolomeo Giangolini (circa 1560 - 1640) was an Italian painter active in Fano.

== Biography ==
He trained under Ludovico Carracci in Bologna. Giangolini painted for many of the churches in Fano, including the Cathedral, San Paterniano, Santa Maria Nuova, San Marco and Santa Maria del Suffragio. His painting of Augustine and the child at the sea's edge is present in the Pinacoteca Civica of Fano.
