= Paoluccio Cattamara =

Italian painter

Paoluccio Cattamara (active 1718) was an artist of Naples, who painted fruit, birds, and medals, in still life canvases.

== Sources ==
- Bryan, Michael (1886). Robert Edmund Graves (ed.). Dictionary of Painters and Engravers, Biographical and Critical. Vol. I: A-K. London: George Bell and Sons. p. 252.
