= Giovanni Temini =

Giovanni Temini was an Italian engraver of the Baroque period. His name is affixed to a portrait dated 1622 of Carlo Gonzales, Duke of Mantua from 1627.
