= Francesco Saverio Torcia =

Italian painter (1840–1891)

Francesco Saverio Torcia (1840–1891) was an Italian painter, mostly of marine landscapes.

== Biography ==
Torcia was born in Naples, Kingdom of the Two Sicilies, where he completed his studies at the Royal Institute of Fine Arts of Naples; he then worked in the studio of Domenico Morelli. Among his works: A Song of Love and Idyll, exhibited at Milan, and reproduced in the Illustrazione Italiana; Smarrita. He painted genre and landscape paintings. He exhibited at Naples; Interior of the church of the Geroliminì and Vesuvius exhibited at Naples; Una marina, exhibited to Genoa, a canvas titled: Impressions of November 2nd and a Flower seller in Naples. Torcia became professor of design for schools in Naples; he lobbied to have Domenico Morelli restored to leadership posts in the Neapolitan Academy.
