= Gaetano Palazzi =

Italian painter (1832–1892)

Gaetano Palazzi (Bologna, 1832–1892) was an Italian painter.

He was a resident of Bologna. He exhibited in 1883 at Rome, two paintings: L'asso di briscola and La Nonna e la nipotino; at the 1886 Exhibition of Milan, he submitted another canvas entitled II Carnevale; and at the Exhibition Nazionale di Bologna two canvases, depicting intimate family and carnaval scenes.
