= Elviro Raimondi =

Italian painter

Elviro Raimondi (Naples, April 11, 1867–) was an Italian painter.

== Biography ==
He first studied literature, but then moved to take courses in the Royal Institute of Fine Arts of Naples, studying design under professor Stanislao Lista, and paintings and a course of decoration with Ignazio Perricci. He exhibited at the Promotrice of Naples in 1882 an oil canvas titled: Mal tempo. In 1888, he exhibited at the Mostra Italiana of London a painting titled Molo di Naples, bought by the artist Stoppani. At the 1888 Promotrice of Naples he displayed: Sulla Via di Minori, bought by the painter Borchardt; and a half-figure in oil: Olga. he taught for two years at the Ateneo Chierchia. he also completes, watercolors. and fans for sale.

He spent much of the year in Capri, where he often sold paintings to visiting tourists. In 1891–92 at the Esposizione Nazionale at Palermo, he exhibited Ad Amalfi and Studio dal Vero. At the 1895-96 National Exposition of Fine Arts of the Societa Amatori e Cultori di Belle Arti in Rome, he exhibited Una via di Amalfi.

A painter by the first name Elvira or Elviro Raimondi was active until the 1960s; it is unlikely to be identical to this painter.
