= Antonio Puglicochi =

Italian painter

Antonio Puglicochi was an Italian painter of the Baroque period, active mainly in his native city of Florence. He was a pupil successively of Pietro Dandini and Ciro Ferri.
