= Giulio Tonduzzi =

Italian painter

Giulio Tonduzzi (c.1513 – c.1583) was an Italian painter of the Renaissance period.

He was born in Faenza, which flourished in the first half of the 16th century. He was a pupil of Giulio Romano. He painted a Stoning of S. Stephen for the church in Faenza. He also worked in Ravenna.
