= Giacomo Lippi =

Italian painter

Giacomo Lippi (late 16th century) was an Italian painter of the Baroque. He was, born at Budrio. He was a pupil of Lodovico Carracci. He completed frescoes of Scenes from the life of the Virgin for the church of the Annunciation at Bologna. He is also called Giacomo da Budrio or Giacomo della Lippa.
