= Gregorio Porideo =

Italian painter

Gregorio Porideo was an Italian painter of Venice. He was a pupil of Titian.
