= Luigi Marengo =

Italian painter (1928–2010)

Luigi Marengo (born 3 February 1928 in Gallarate, Province of Varese; died 5 January 2010) was a 20th-century Italian painter.

== Biography ==
Marengo's paintings have been displayed throughout Italy and around the world, including at the Grand Palais Museum in Paris, France and The Contemporary Garden, Venice, Italy. His work is included in numerous public and private collections internationally.

In his early years, Marengo was most inspired by the natural landscapes found in and around Northern Italy. He found his signature style in the early 1940s with his self-titled genre, Instinctivism of the Sign. Best described as a unique combination of abstract and expressionist art, Marengo attempted to portray the instinctual expressions of modern man that due to the domination of technology in life is inherently solitary and desolate.

Marengo attempted to explain his pictorial experience developing the "Sign" from the 1940s through the 1960s in a letter to a critic in 1972: "I felt compelled to insert in each painting, a "Sign". In this way, I intend to explain that man should plagiarize his own natural subjectivity...Going forward with such resources, the "Instinctive Sign" has evolved into geometrical shapes such as triangles, circles and squares...With this methodology, the pantomime leads to a real and objective dimension."

The Luigi Marengo Foundation was established in 2006 in order to ensure the preservation of Marengo's artistic heritage and to protect the intellectual property rights of his works.
