= Giacomo Coltrini =

Italian painter

Giacomo Coltrini (16th century) was an Italian painter, active mainly in a Renaissance style in Brescia, and a military engineer for Venetian Republic. He painted frescoes for the subterranean church of San Faustino Maggiore in Brescia. He died as a military engineer in Candia. Titian's paternal uncle, Gregorio Vecelli, lived in Coltrini's house in Venice.

== Sources ==
- Boni, Filippo de' (1852). Biografia degli artisti ovvero dizionario della vita e delle opere dei pittori, degli scultori, degli intagliatori, dei tipografi e dei musici di ogni nazione che fiorirono da'tempi più remoti sino á nostri giorni. Seconda Edizione. Venice; Googlebooks: Presso Andrea Santini e Figlio. p. 239.
