= Giovanni Patrone =

Italian painter

Giovanni Patrone (March 17, 1847 – ?) was an Italian painter of figures, in both oil and watercolor.

== Biography ==
He was born in Naples. He studied painting and won many awards at the Royal Institute of Fine Arts of Naples under Domenico Morelli and Filippo Palizzi. He became professor of design. At the Promotrice of Naples, he exhibited: Un momento di riposo: Mezza figura al vero; Fanciulla; and Vecchiaia.
