= Bernardo Regoliron =

Italian painter

Bernardo Regoliron was an Italian portrait painter, practising in the second half of the 18th century, was a pupil of P. P. Cristofani. At Vienna there are portraits by him of the Emperor Joseph II and of his brother Leopold.
