= Ranunzio Prata =

Italian painter

Ranunzio Prata was an Italian painter. He was born in Milan, and painted in Pavia around 1635. He may be the author of an altarpiece at San Francesco, Brescia.
