= Giuseppe Sartori =

Italian painter (1863–1922)

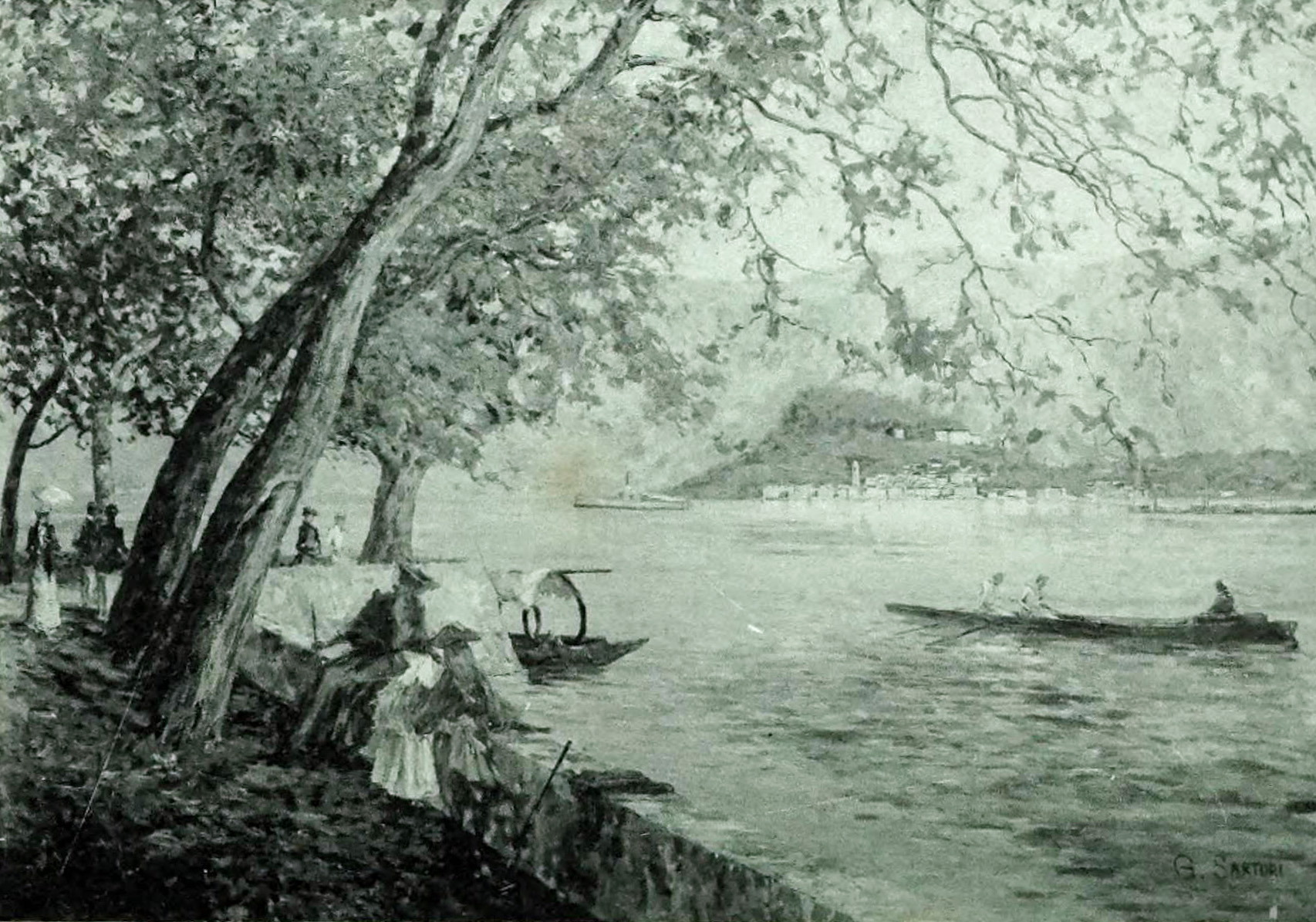
Giuseppe Sartori, Between Cadenabbia and Tremezzo (1891)

Giuseppe Sartori (1863 – 1922) was an Italian painter, painting mainly land and seascapes, both urban vedute and rural.

He was born in Venice, Austrian Empire, and resident in Milan. In 1883, at Milan, he displayed a Studio dal vero, and Un' impressione a Lonigo. He frequently sent paintings to the Fine Arts Exhibitions of Turin: in 1884: Tra le aivole; Sui colli; Campagna squallida; Schizzi d'album; Ave Maria (miniature); and Beverie. In 1886 at Milan, he displayed: Scogliera di Nervi; Stazione pescareccio; and Tempo minaccioso. In the next year, in Venice: Invalidi del mare; Miseria sfarzosa; Dalle zattere, Giudecca; and Venezia rossa. In 1888 at Bologna, he exhibits: Sera dalle zattere. He painted a few historical subjects: La galera d'Oufrè Giustinian announces to Venice the Victory at Lepanto. He died in 1922 in Padova, Kingdom of Italy.
