= Adolfo Carlo Barone =

Italian painter

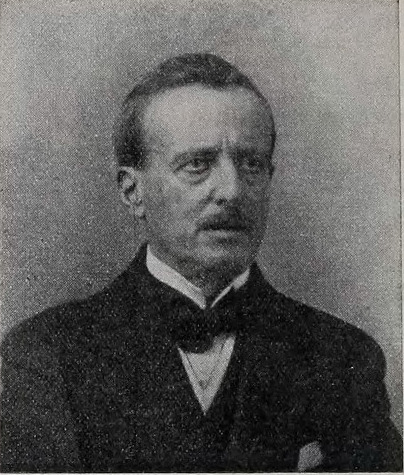
- Born: 1861; Naples
- Died: 1936 (aged 74–75); Italy
- Occupation: Painter

Adolfo Carlo Barone (1861–1936), also known as Carlo Adolfo Barone, was an Italian painter.

Barone was active mainly in Naples, the city of his birth. He was known as a painter of battles and military subjects. In the 1887 Exposition in Venice, he exhibited Li uscita di piazza d'armi and Arrivo al campo.
