= Domenico Morani =

Italian painter and sculptor

Domenico Morani (Polistena, Reggio Calabria, 1813 – Rome, 1870) was an Italian painter and sculptor, active mainly in Naples, Italy. He painted mostly historical and religious topics.

His father Fortunato Morani was an engineer. He trained with Tito Angelini. In 1832, at the Benedictine Convent of La Cava, he had a fortuitous encounter with the English poet Walter Scott, this led to some patronage by the local English expatriate community. He was able to win some scholarships from the Bourbon court to work in Rome, where he won some patronage from the Torlonia family.
