= Pio Caglieri =

Italian painter

Pio Caglieri (born 1848) was an Italian painter, mainly of landscapes in his native Piedmont.

Caglieri resided in Turin, and is described as a pupil of Antonio Fontanesi. While his primary employment was as a captain of infantry, he was and avid painter of small landscapes. He also practiced lithography. At the Promotrice of Turin in 1870, he exhibited Un Ricordo del Canavese. In 1873 at the Universal Exposition in Vienna, he exhibited a Mattino di Brughiera.

He exhibited frequently, including at the 1880 Turin Exposition: A Mid-Autumn; at the 1881 Mostra Nazionale of Fine Arts of Milan, he exhibited Countryside in October. At the 1883 Mostra di Rome he sent La balza; Two Alpine Chapels at San Giovanni d'Andorno and La calma della sera. In 1884 at Turin, he displayed: La schiuma del mare; Maltino; Mare tranquillo, and Per tutta la vita.
