= Marco Chierice =

Italian painter (1580–?)

Marco Chierice (1580–?) was an Italian painter from Correggio.

== Biography ==
He was born and trained in Correggio. He mainly painted still-lives and landscapes. He painted in the parish church of Mandriolo (a frazione of Correggio), and for the destroyed Casino of Count Ottavio Bolognesi. He was also a painter for Duke Ferdinand Charles of Mantua.
