= Marcello Figolino =

Italian painter

Marcello Figolino (born c. 1430) was an Italian painter of the Renaissance period, active mainly in his natal city of Vicenza, where he painted an Adoration of the Magi for San Bartolomeo, and a Madonna and child with saints for San Francesco. He also painted an altarpiece for San Tomasso.

== Sources ==
- Farquhar, Maria (1855). Ralph Nicholson Wornum (ed.). Biographical catalogue of the principal Italian painters. London: Woodfall & Kinder. p. 62.
