= Luigi Scaffai =

Italian painter (1837–1899)

Luigi Scaffai (1837–1899) was an Italian painter.

He studied at the Academy of Fine Arts of Florence, and resided for most of his life in the same city. He painted various subjects, but mainly genre paintings, mostly sold to foreigners. Among his works: Il fumatore in erba; Il piccolo fumatore; Tu brucerai!; Genio precocci; Genio nascente; L' allievo del cacciatore; La Nonna; L' assaggio del vino; Divertimento infantile; La disposizione alla musica; Lezione di tamburo; Pioggia artificiale; Il bacio della mamma; I maccheroni; Un frate sculptor; Un frate musicante; Un medico d'occasione; and un duello incruento.
