= Ernesto Levorati =

Italian painter

Ernesto Levorati (fl. 1876 – 1920) was an Italian painter, mainly of genre subjects set in period costumes of the earlier Venetian centuries.

== Biography ==
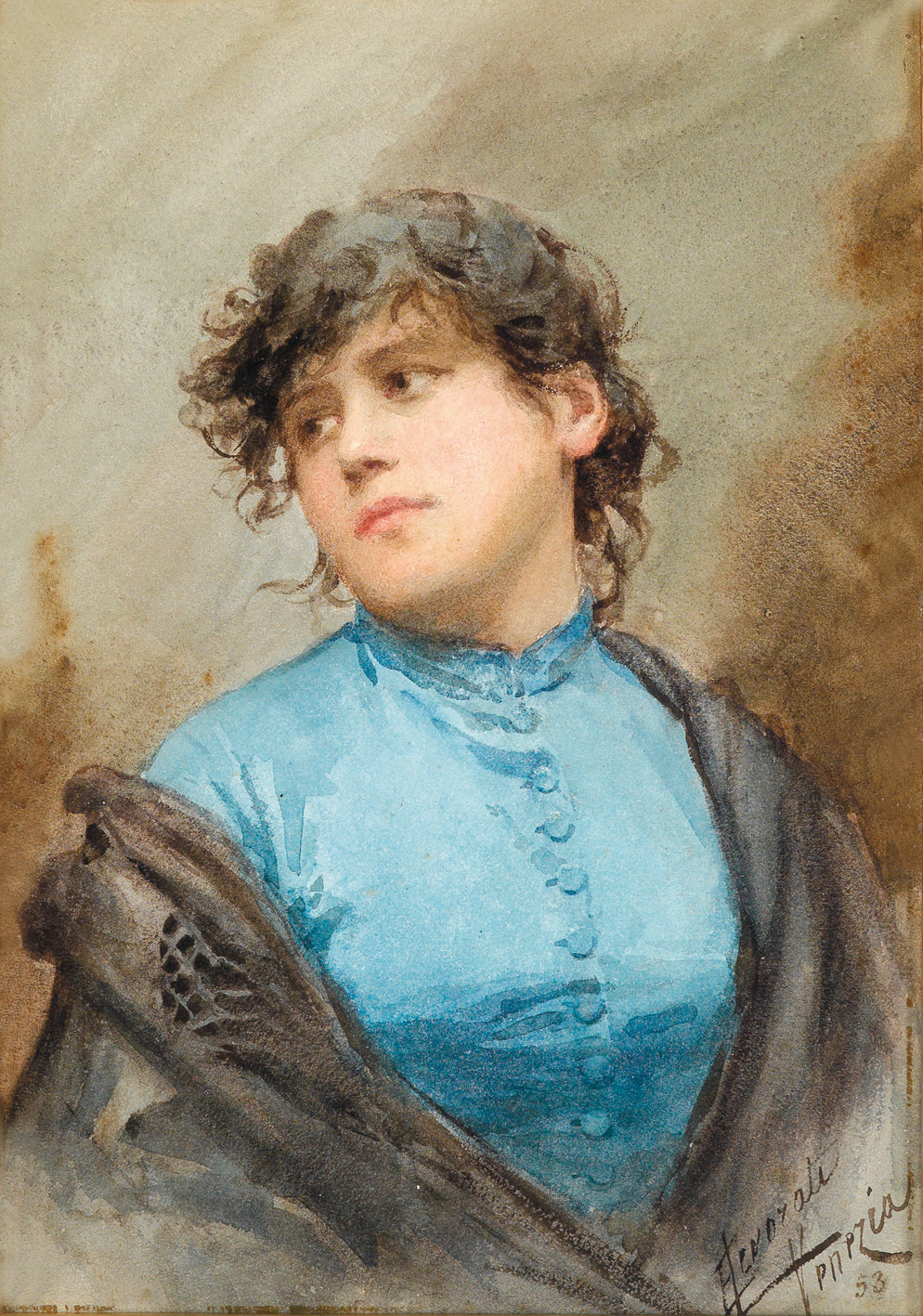
Young Woman in Blue Blouse (1853)

He was a resident of Venice since 1884 and after in Susegana. In 1874 to Milan, he sent Interior of the Church of Santa Maria dei Frari. In 1885, he displayed Popolana. In 1880, at Turin, he exhibited Scene veneziane; in 1881 at Milan, Una Ninetta and Un acquaiolo. To Rome he sent Il mio piccino and Rio Santa Barbara di notte. To Turin, in 1884, he sent Autumn and Spring. In 1885 to Milan, he sent Verso Sera and Quiete. To Venice, in 1887, I Figli in Africa and Tipi veneziano. Also exhibiting in Milan were Testa di Ragazza (1890) and Idillio (1893). His last known exhibited painting from 1898, was a Portrait of a young boy.
