= David Sani =

Italian painter

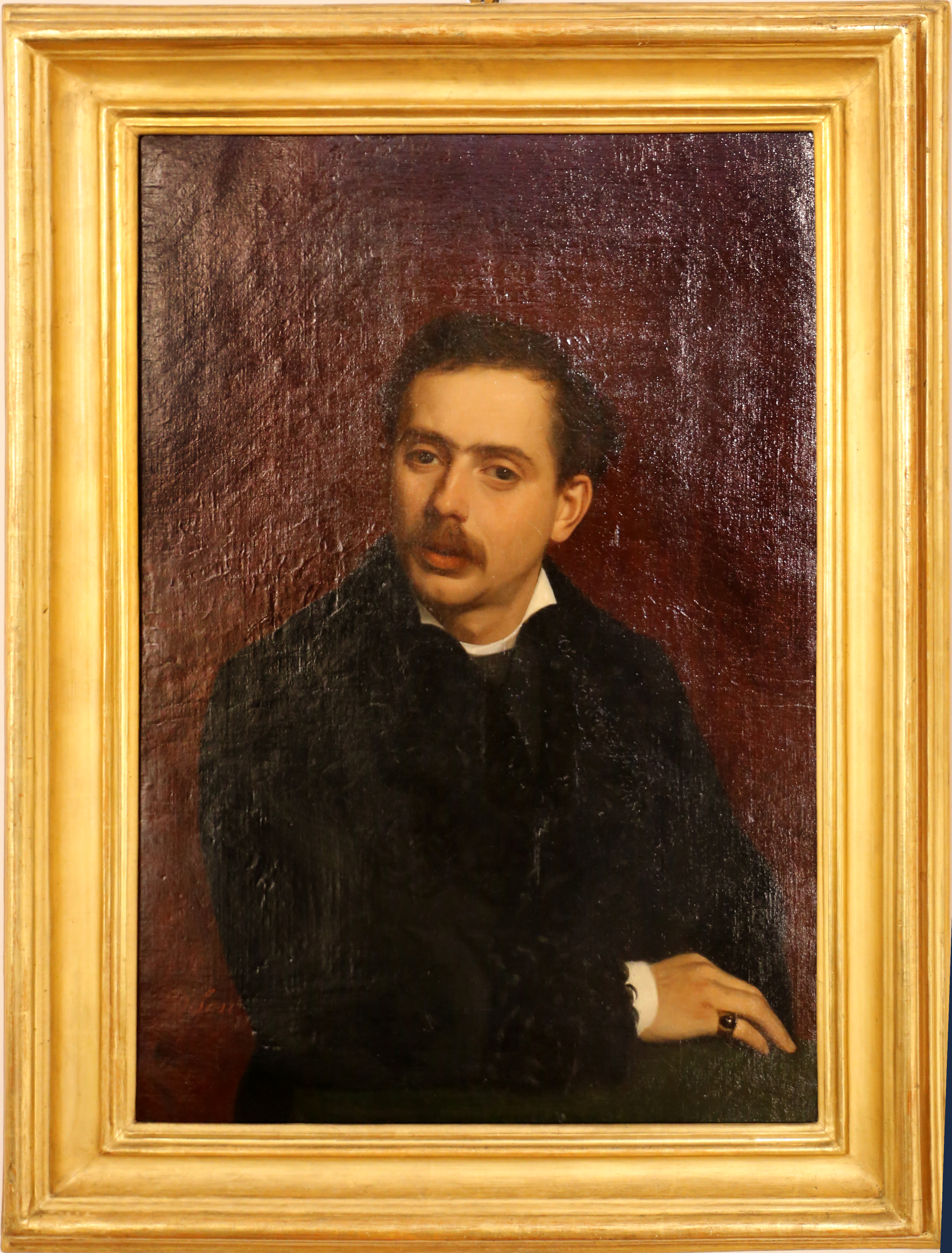

David Giuseppe Sani (1828–1914) was an Italian painter, mainly of genre subjects.

He was born and resident in Florence, which was part of the Grand Duchy of Tuscany until he was about 32. Among his works: La vocazione della Musica; La ricreazione; exhibited in Florence in 1882. In 1884, at the Exhibition of the Society for the Encouragement of Fine Arts in Florence, he displayed three paintings depicting : In guarda roba; Che bel colore!; and La piccola massaia.
