= Giuseppe Bottero =

Italian painter (1846–1930)

Giuseppe Bottero (1846, Asti – 1930) was an Italian painter, active mainly in Turin, as a genre painter. Later in life, he became an engineer and lieutenant general.

== Biography ==
He initially trained with Giuseppe Giani, then studied at the Accademia Albertina in Turin. From there, he moved to Rome, where he befriended Antonio Mancini.

The contemporary critic, De Gubernatis, described him as having the artistic temperament and courage of a painter of the Cinquecento. At the National Exhibition of Turin, he displayed Il Coltello and Sul Golgota (On Golgotha). In the Exhibition of 1886 in Milan, he displayed: Compagni di sventura. In the 1887 exhibition of Venice, he displayed Hypochondria and La Posa.
