= Berto Linajuolo =

Italian painter

Berto Linajuolo was an Italian painter, active in Florence, who lived in the first part of the 15th century. His pictures gained him sufficient fame to cause him to be summoned to the court of Hungary. Bernard Berenson hypothesized, without any documentation, some anonymous works to a follower of Sandro Botticelli (Amico di Sandro), whom he hypothesized was Linaiuolo.
