= Carlo Muccioli =

Italian painter (1857–1931)

Carlo Muccioli (1857– 1931) was an Italian painter, in watercolors and oils, mainly of genre subjects. He was born and died in Rome.

At the 1881 Exhibition at Milan del 1881, he sent a half-figure of a woman in modern dress. In 1883 at Rome, he displayed a canvas of the Roman carnival, titled Ercoli!.. Eccoli!.., a Portrait of signora A.., and another Portrait of a Lady. To the Turin Exhibition, he sent a Margherita based on Faust by Goethe. Venice, in 1887, another canvas portante titled: Fiato sprecato, che la critica trovò assai interessante.

From 1879 to the last decade of the nineteenth century, he routinely participated at the yearly exhibitions of the Society degli Amatori e Cultori di Roma. For example in 1882, he displayed Rimembranze, L'appuntamento, Una Merveilleuse, and Un soldo di politica; in 1885, La Margherita di Goethe; and in 1886, Fatima- costume di Tripoli.

After 1887, he also painted subjects reflecting the colonial war campaigns, completing studies of the Soldato in divisa della campagna d'Africa (1887, now in Museo di Palazzo Braschi, in Rome) and a painting depicting the Battle of Dogali (exhibited in 1890 in Rome). He also painted sacred subjects and decorations. He was named director of the Vatican School of Mosaics. Among the works of this type, are his mosaic altarpiece depicting the Apparition of Christ to Santa Margherita Alacocque, in St Peter's Basilica.
