= Bernardo Martorana =

Italian painter

Bernardo Martorana (April 25, 1846 – after 1891) was an Italian painter, active in Sicily painting historical and landscape subjects.

He was born in Palermo, Kingdom of the Two Sicilies. He studied mainly engraving and acquaforte under Aloisio Juvara at the Institute of Fine Arts of Naples. He was known for his ability in rendering the bony anatomy. He exhibited L'Alfa e l'Omega in 1883 at the Mostra Italo-Spagnuola held at Berlin. At the 1875 Promotrice Salvator Rosa of Naples, he displayed La donna emancipata. At the same exhibition in 1876, Gioie intime; in 1877, Studio di paesaggio (pencil); in 1880, La figlia del colono; in 1883, Col cane da punta; in 1884, Commedia eterna; in 1885, Veri amici; and in 1891, Cacciando in montagna.
