= Vincenzo Capobianchi =

Italian painter

Vincenzo Capobianchi or Capobianchi (1836 – 28 September 1928) was an Italian painter born in Rome, who is best known for painting realistic Neo-Pompeian genre scenes. He was also a prominent numismatist, and author of papers on Italian coinage.

Among his works are: The Yellow Dress (1875), Roman children practice indoor archery (1881), and The Merchant of Fine Antiquities
