= Girolamo Santo =

Italian painter

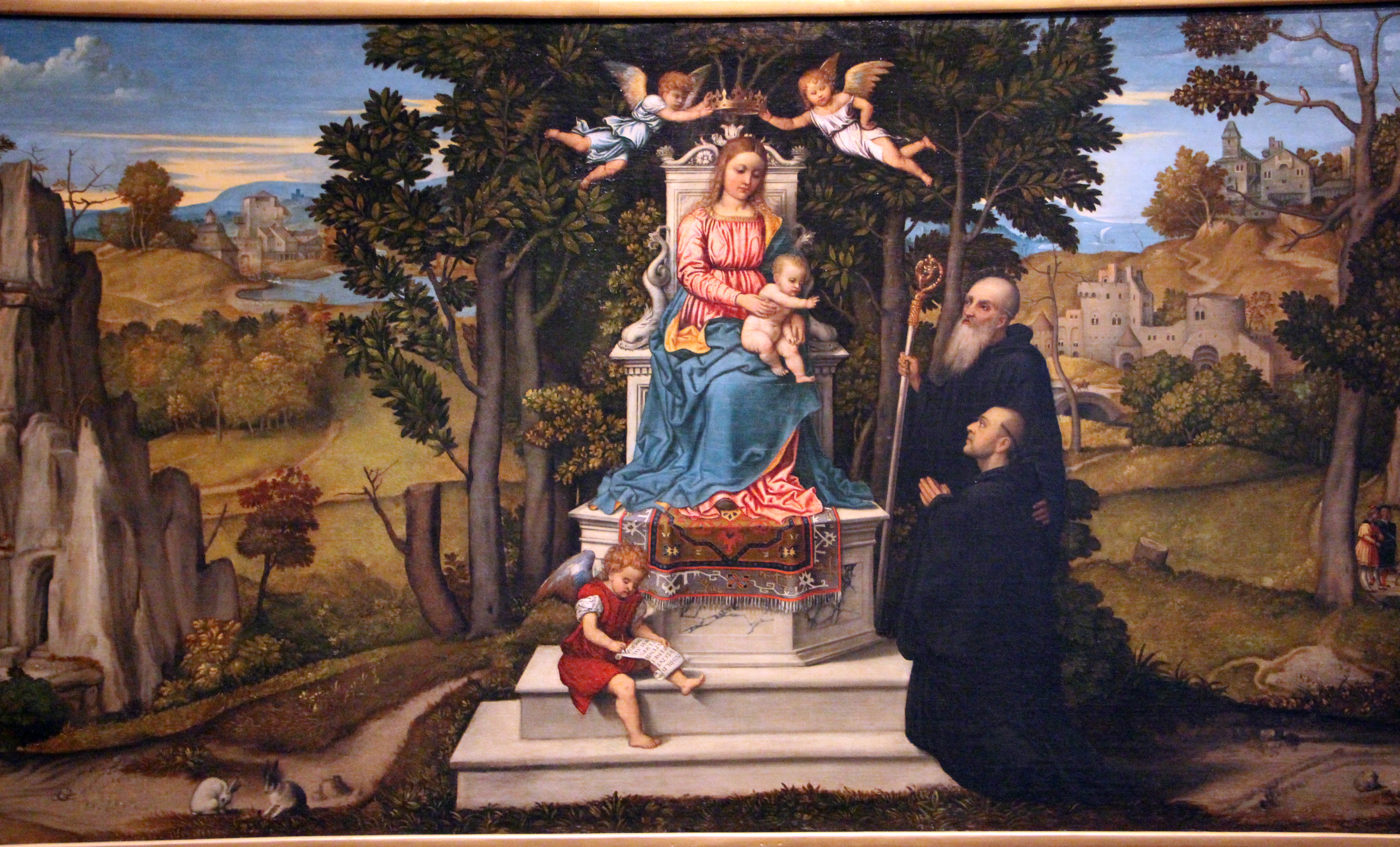
Madonna enthroned between angels and saints, circa 1521

Girolamo Santo (also called il Sordo or Girolamo da Padova) was an Italian painter of the Renaissance, active in the 16th century. In Padua, he painted the facade of the Cornaro Palace, several frescoes in S. Francesco, and, with Bernardo Parentino, scenes from the life of St. Benedict in S. Giustina. A curious picture of a genealogical tree in the Santo is also ascribed to him. He was still living in 1546.
