= Giovanni Lavezzari =

Italian painter (1817–1881)

Giovanni Lavezzari (1817–1881) was an Italian painter.

Born in Venice, then part of the Austrian Empire, he was a resident of Florence, where he became Professor of Perspective in the Academy of Fine Arts. He painted many Venetian vedute and scenes including Pesca nella laguna; Gondola veneziana, exhibited at Turin in 1880; Di ritorno dal Lido, exhibited at Milan in 1881; Serbatojo di granchi nella laguna; Barche in disarmo; Parco dell' Isola Sant' Elena, exhibited in Rome in 1883; and at the 1883 Promotrice of Florence, Courtyard of the Doge's Palace at Venice.
