= Stefano Provenzali =

Italian painter

Stefano Provenzali was an Italian painter of the Baroque period, active in his native Cento. He was a pupil of Guercino. He is known for his paintings of battles.
