= Pietro di Niccolò da Orvieto =

Italian painter (1430–1484)

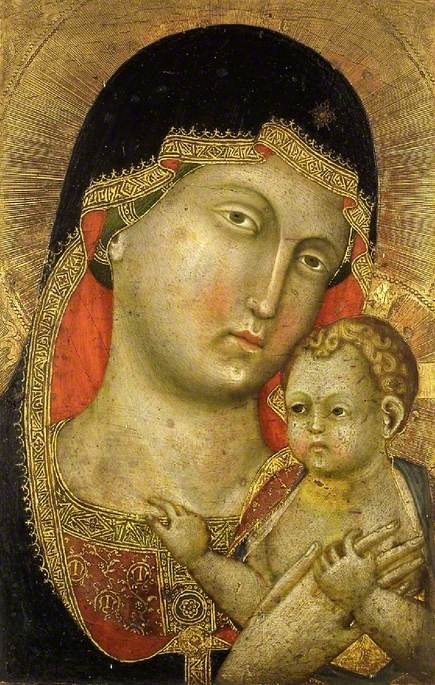
‘Virgin and Child’ by Pietro di Niccolo da Orvieto

Pietro di Niccolò da Orvieto (1430–1484) was an Italian Renaissance painter.

Not much is known about Pietro di Niccolò da Orvieto's life except through his works. He was born, worked, and lived all his life in Northern Italy, and his style puts him in the Umbrian School. He primarily painted religious-themed works for local church commissions. He died in 1484. One of his works is part of the Fitzwilliam Museum collection.
