= Domenico Someda =

Italian painter (1859–1944)

Domenico Someda (Rivolto di Codroipo, 1859 - Udine, 1944) was an Italian painter.

He was born and lived in Udine, in the Friuli region, which was part of the Austrian Empire and then Austria-Hungary until 1918. While in Venice in 1887, he exhibited a large historical canvas depicting the Hungarian Invasion.
