= Eugenio Renazzi =

Italian painter (1863–1914)

Eugenio Renazzi also surnamed Renazzi del Castello (Rome, 1863- 1914) was an Italian painter, painting genre and Orientalist subjects.

He lived in Rome. He studied at the Academy of Fine Arts of Florence. He exhibited in Florence: Dopo il veglione; In Villa; Portrait; and Sentinella araba.
