= Federigo Reale =

Italian painter

Federigo or Federico Reale (Naples, March 8, 1862- ) was an Italian painter, mainly of landscapes.

He was a resident of Naples where he completed his studies. He exhibited in 1883 at Rome: Sul lago. In 1884 at Turin, he exhibited a study from nature depicting: The Park of Caserta, near the lake of the English Garden. Among his works are: Quiete mattinale, Studio d'alberi; Il Volturno; and Il Volturno or Dagli accampamenti dei Garibaldini in 1866.
