= Emma Moretto =

Italian painter

Emma Moretto (19th-century) was an Italian painter, active in Venice painting landscapes and vedute.

In 1877 at Naples, Moretto exhibited: Abbey of San Gregorio at Venice; in 1880 at Turin, a Canale della Giudecca, and another of the Canale di San Giorgio. At the 1881 National Exhibition of Milan, Tramonto e Marina; and in 1883 at Rome: Gita nella Laguna. Other works: A Gondola; At San Marco; Verso la riva; Canal grande, and Mattino nel mare.
