= Antonio Melchioni =

Italian painter

Antonio Melchioni (Pallanza, Province of Novara, 1847 - Turin, 1921) was an Italian painter, of both watercolors and oils. He was eclectic in subjects, but was best known for his genre subjects.

== Biography ==
In 1875 at Genoa, he exhibited Lo studio del pittore; in 1877 also at Genoa, Passatempo nell'harem; in 1879 at Turin Passioni d'amore; in 1882 at Turin, Baccante; and in 1885 at Milan, Le amiche. He also painted sea-scapes painted on site such as Riviera di Levante, exhibited in 1879 at Genoa.

He was a resident of Turin. Among his works: Studio d'un povero pittore, exhibited at Turin in 1880 along with: Rèverie. This latter painting was also displayed at the 1881 Milan Exhibition alongside Baccante; Cantiniera; Allo specchio; and L'attesa amorosa. This latter painting was also exhibited in 1884 at Turin. He continued to exhibit until 1908.
