= Pietro Policastrelli =

Italian painter

Pietro Policastrelli (19th century) was an Italian painter, mainly of landscapes.

He was born and a resident of Palermo. Among his works are: Il meriggio; La luna di miele; Sulla sera; Paese solitario and Campagna siciliana.
