= Andrea Sguazella =

Italian painter

Andrea Sguazella was a 16th-century Italian painter of the Renaissance period, active mainly in Florence and France. He was a pupil of the painter Andrea del Sarto and stayed behind to paint in the court of Francis I of France.
