= Edelberto Dosi =

Italian painter and composer (1852–1891)

Edelberto Dosi (28 January 1852 – 25 September 1891) was an Italian painter and composer active in Parma. As a painter, his subjects were mainly landscapes and vedute.

== Biography ==
He painted a Cloister of the Ospedale Civile of Parma, once displayed in the Royal Gallery of Parma. He painted a Paesaggio Egiziano, Fiori, Romanza, and Quadro in cornice d' ebano e figure sacre for the April 1880 Esposizione parmense di arte antica.

He trained in the Academy of Fine Arts of Parma, and was a pupil of Italo Azzoni. In 1880, he composed a romanza for soprano to words of Luigi Capranica, titled La Moribonda. In 1882, he also wrote a waltz for pianoforte, to words by Adolfo Cortesi, titled Pane, burro e vino bianco. In 1882, his military march, Attenti! was played in the Piazza Grande di Parma, by the band of the 70th Regiment of Infantry.
