= Plinio Plini =

Italian painter

Plinio Plini (Perugia, Umbria, late 19th century) was an Italian painter, mainly painting interior vedute of churches, in oil and watercolor.

He was a resident and active in Perugia. In 1872, he exhibited at the Exposition of Milan, The Choir of the church of San Pietro in Perugia and La cappella del Cambio of the same city. He also painted Interior of the Vestibule of the Confraternita di San Francesco a Perugia; Interior of the church of San Giovannino del Cambio; The choir of Santa Giuliana, and the Facade of San Bernardino.
