= Francesco Scarpinato =

Italian painter (1840–1895)

Francesco Scarpinato (August 11, 1840 – December 27, 1895) was an Italian painter.

Scarpinato was born in Palermo. He was a prolific painter of genre scenes and vedute of his native Sicily. He had success at exhibitions, including in 1877 Venice, with his painting A Rustic Shabby House. In Turin, in 1880, he exhibited Il Villaggio. At the 1883 Milanese Mostra of Fine Arts, he exhibited La Spiaggia della Colonetfa and Tramonto. The same year at the Exposition of Rome he displayed Sicilian Countryside, A Courtyard, and A Morning in Palermo. The latter canvas was exhibited at the Exposition of Turin in 1884. In 1886 at Livorno, he displayed Last Rays and Tramonto in Sicily. The next year in Venice he exhibited Era l'ora del desìo.
