= Marco Genovesini =

Italian painter

Marco or Bartolomeo Genovesini (active 1628) was an Italian painter or two brothers of the Roverio family who were painters, and active in the Augustinian Monastery and the Carthusian Monastery of Garignano in Milan. This name should not be confused with the painter il Genovesino (Luigi Miradori).
