= Enrico Maccioni =

Italian painter (born 1940)

- Born: 9 January 1940 (age 86); Florence, Italy
- Occupation: Painter
- Movement: Contemporary

Enrico Maccioni (born 9 January 1940) is an Italian painter of contemporary art.

== Biography ==
Enrico Maccioni is an Italian painter and draftsman, known for his instinctive poetic painting, he has been suffering from spastic tetraparesis since birth. He exhibited in 1949 in Cagliari, Venice and Reggio Emilia, in 1951. In 1960 in Florence on a personal exhibition curated by the Academy of Music, Sciences and Art Italy-Brazil, International Art Gallery, in Milan in 1963 with a personal exhibition at the Montenapoleone Gallery. He exhibited in 1969 in Mantua, in 1970 in Dubrovnik. In 1972 in Athens, the third international review "Spring 1972" (by invitation) awarded with a gold medal, in 1974 in Malta. In 1974 in Montecarlo, the Third European Biennial. Gold medal in Ville de Monaco, 1974. Participates in the Graphic and Black and White Review "Homage to Pablo Picasso", European Center "The In 1975 Tabernacle" receives the gold medal award. 1975 in London Review “Spring 1975. In 1976 in Luxembourg and Brussels, in Paris, London, in 1978 and 1980 in Strasbourg. On personal show at Palazzo Barberini in 1981. In 1998 Maccioni wrote a book of poems interspersed with photos, in black and white, “Il Fiore della Vita”.

== Paintings in museums ==
- Galleria degli Uffizi, Uffizi.

== Bibliography ==
- Monograph, Enrico Maccioni, Laudes creaturarum quas beatus Franciscus ad laudem Dei fecit Henricus Maccionus nigro humillime commentatus est lapillo, Florentiae, P. Benveduti, 1965.
- Monograph, Disegni/Enrico Maccioni, Roma, Grafiche SIGAP.
- Catalog, Mostra antologica del pittore Enrico Maccioni, Cagliari : Galleria d'arte La Porta d'oro, 1968.
- Catalog, Disegni e pitture di Enrico Maccioni, Mino Borghi.
- Personal exhibition by Enrico Maccioni e di Clara Maccioni Branca, dal 18 al 30 gennaio 1951, Gabinetto delle Stampe "Anna Marongiu Pernis".
- Monograph, Enrico Maccioni, by Aurelio T. Prete, Accademia internazionale per l'unità della cultura, stampa 1981.
- Monograph, ITALIAN ART IN THE WORLD, CELIT editions, 1970.
- Catalog, Quando la fantasia diventa arte : Biennale 2021, 2. edizione, concorso internazionale di pittura, by Daniela Negrelli, Andrea Nassi. ISBN 979-12-80434-01-2
