= Antonio Tognone =

Italian painter

Antonio Tognone was an Italian painter of the Renaissance. He was a fresco painter of Vicenza, who was instructed by Giovanni Battista Zelotti, during his stay in that city (c. 1580), where certain frescoes by Tognone still remain. He died young in Vicenza.
