= Guglielmo Navorelli =

Italian painter (1865–1916)

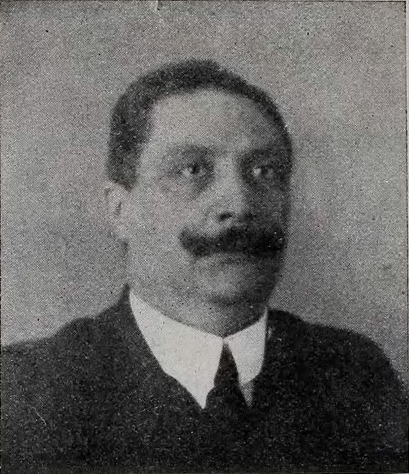
- Born: 22 December 1866; Naples
- Died: 1916 (aged 49–50)
- Occupation: Painter

Guglielmo Navorelli (Naples, 1865–1916) was an Italian painter. He painted mainly historical subjects and landscapes.

== Biography ==
Navorelli first studied at the Naples Academy of Fine Arts, and then continued his education in Rome with private tutors. After he finished school, he became professor of design at a scuola serale in Naples.

== Career ==
At the Naples Promotrice he exhibited a large canvas entitled Filippo Strozzi Commits Suicide in Prison. At the next Promotrice, he displayed Margherita Pusterla, L' avvelenamento di Don Giovanni, and some landscapes. Other works of Navorellis include Filippo Strozzi Writes the Verses of Virgil (1885),Tramonto (1888), In Un Cortile (1890), and Sopra San Rocco (1891).
