= Bartolomeo Scapuzzi =

Italian painter (1750–?)

- Born: 1750; Gaeta, Papal States
- Died: unknown

Bartolomeo Scapuzzi (born 1750) was an Italian painter of the late-Baroque period.

He was born and active in Gaeta in the Papal States. He trained in Rome. It is unclear how he is related to the 14th century painter Andrea Scapuzzi, who frescoed the ceiling of the chapel of the Holy Sacrament in the church of the Annunziata in Gaeta.
