= Tiziano Pagan De Paganis =

Italian painter (1858-1932)

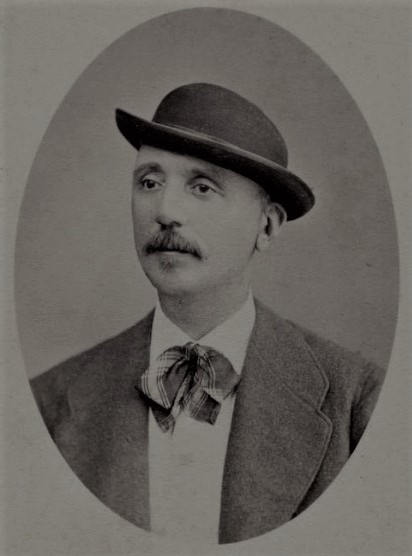
Tiziano Pagan De Paganis

Tiziano Pagan De Paganis (1858–1932) was an Italian painter, mainly of landscapes and genre subjects.

He was born in Verona. He studied at the Academy of Fine Arts of Bologna, where in 1876 he was awarded a diploma for ornamentation. At the 1878 Milan exposition, he displayed two landscapes: Le due torri Asinelli e Garisenda and Il Foro romano. In 1881 at Florence, he exhibited Fra due battute d'aspetto and Una lezione meritata. He remained a resident of Bologna. At the 1885 Promotrice of Bologna, he exhibited Un ottimo amico, Un assalto impreveduto, and Angelus Domini. At the 1888 Esposition at Bologna, he sent Il Rio dì Porretta, Fiori, Ricreazione, and various drawings and designs. He also painted portraits, including miniatures of persons in a landscape.
