= Eraclio Minozzi =

Italian painter

Eraclio Minozzi (December 1847 – after 1909) was an Italian painter, painting landscapes, genre, and portraits.

He was born in Vicenza. After studying in a lyceum, he enrolled at the Accademia of Venice and then went to Milan, where he studied at the Brera Academy. After his first works, he was invited to travel outside of Italy, and went first to Paris, then London for a number of years, painting mainly portraits, including M. C. Hamilton, Sir Blake, Sir M. Drake, and of the Emperors of the Indies by commission by M. Lourissen. He also engraved designs for Minozzi for lithographies and chromolithographies, provided designs for various illustrated English journals. He also traveled to Boston, where he completed works for Suzie M Barstow.

Not adapted to the London climate, he returned to his Vicenza, where he continued to paint mainly portraits. At the regional exposition of Vicenza, he was awarded a bronze medal for his portrait of his father and at the Exhibition of Manchester una honorable mention for a genre canvas titled Solitudine. Other works include Due vecchi sposi (Museo Civico of Vicenza). In 1897 at Florence, he exhibited Sempre felici and Campagna russa. He contributed the altarpiece to the small church of Giare in Gambarare (it), a frazione of Mira, in the Veneto.
