= Bartolomeo da Camogli =

Italian painter

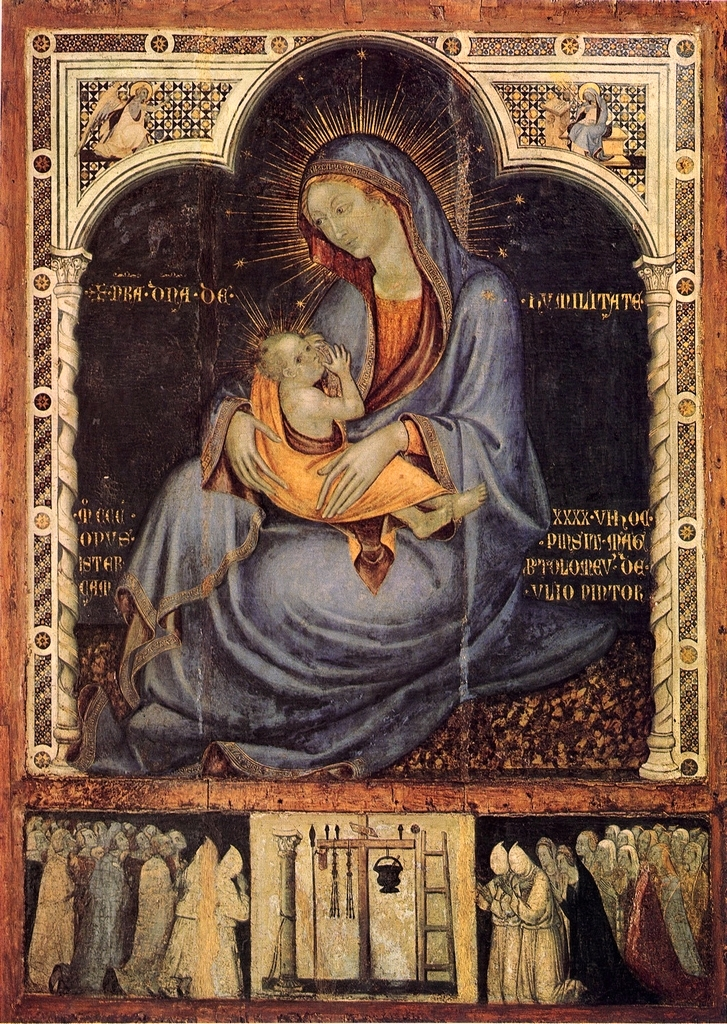
Madonna of Humility, 1346

Bartolommeo Camulio was an Italian painter, active in Genoa in the early to mid-14th century. He painted a Madonna of Humility (1340) in the Palermo Gallery. Also known as Bartolomeo da Camogli or Bartolomeo Pellerano da Camogli.
