= Pasquale Ruggiero =

Italian painter (1851–1915)

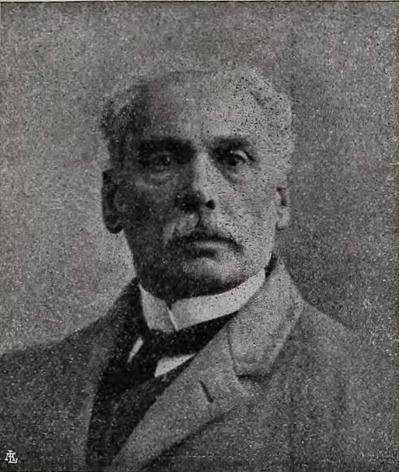
- Born: 20 December 1851
- Died: 11 September 1916 (aged 64); Naples
- Occupation: Painter

Signature
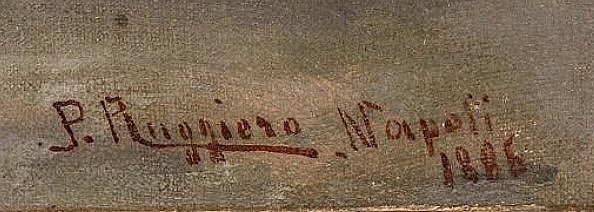

Pasquale Ruggiero (San Marzano sul Sarno, Salerno, 1851 – Naples, 1915) was an Italian painter, mainly of portraits and genre subjects in a Realist style.

== Biography ==
He resided in Naples. In 1877 at Naples, he exhibited: L' ascensione del Pallone and Il primo saluto. In 1881 at Milan, he displayed; Trastulli if infanzia and Costumi Napoletani.
