= Giovanni Battista Maderni =

Italian-Swiss painter

Giovanni Battista Maderni (1758–1803) was an Italian-Swiss painter.

He was born in Verona to Pietro Maderni, a sculptor native to Codilago in the Ticino. Giovanni Battista studied in the Academy of Fine Arts of Florence. Returning to Verona, he painted a canvas of Fall of the Jews in Mantua for a local church. He traveled to Paris, Berlin, London, Netherlands. He made a set of engravings on describing the art and architecture of the Teatro Tordinona in Rome. He then moved to St Petersburg, and finally to Stockholm.
