= Alessandro Sani =

Italian painter

Alessandro Sani (1856–1927) was an Italian painter, mainly of genre subjects.

== Biography ==
He was born and resident in Florence. Considered one of the last great Italian painters, Alessandro was one of few artists who remained in Italy during the mass immigration to the US in the late 1800s and early 1900s, making his works some of the only Italian artwork produced during that period.

Among his works: La tentazione, completed in 1879; Una lezione di mandolino; Scacco matto; Il piatto favorito; Una partita a scacchi; Soldati e Ostessa; Un cercatore mal capitato; Le promesse; La visita alla balia; Il saggio del vino; his paintings faithfully reproduce interior scenes.
