= Giovanni Battista Livizzani =

Italian painter and poet

Giovanni Battista Livizzani was an Italian painter and poet, who lived in the first part of the 17th century. Some of Livizzani's pictures have been engraved. However, he was more famous for his written works than his paintings.
