= Gennesio Liberale =

Italian painter

Gennesio Liberale (or Gensio) was an Italian painter of the Venetian school. He was born at Udine, and flourished in the second half of the 16th century. He was a pupil of San Danielo da Pellegrino, and painted still lifes of animals and fish.
