= Rinaldo Priora =

Italian painter

Rinaldo Priora (Turin, 12 October 1864 – 1942) was an Italian painter, mainly of still lifes and landscapes.

He studied in the Accademia Albertina and was a resident of Turin. Two still-lives were exhibited in Rome in 1883. Among his other works are Bacche morte; Farfalle morenti; Sera; Ruit-Horn, and Impressions.

In 1885, he completed Viottolo ai campi, Note grigie, Rustico; in 1891, he completed L'ora triste; and finally in 1892, Riva solitaria and Ultima luce. He was also a writer of art critiques.
