= Catello Palmigiano =

Italian painter (born 1853)

Catello Palmigiano (September 18, 1853 – after 1883) was an Italian painter, mainly of genre subjects, often in period costume.

He was born in Castellamare di Stabia, near Naples. He studied at the Institute of Fine Arts in Naples, specializing in landscape painting, and remained a resident of Castellamare di Stabia. He debuted in 1872 at the Promotrice partenopea with The remains of a feudal house, where he also exhibited in 1873 (The house of Bonito in Castellammare his homeland and Surroundings of Vesuvius) and 1874. In 1883 at Rome, he exhibited Fantasia and Ricordi di Castellamare. He exhibited in other cities Neo-Pompeian subjects, including Il tempio di Venere a Pompei (The temple of Venus in Pompei), which was sent to Milan in 1872. He later emigrated to Brazil.
