= Francesco Monteverde =

Italian painter

Francesco Monteverde (19th century) was an Italian painter, mainly genre and landscape painting, often with a melancholy air.

He was born in Forte Brescia, in Lombardy, and resided there. He exhibited: Luogo desolato; Piazza della Valle; I curiosi.
