= Marco Ricchiedeo =

Italian painter

Marco Ricchiedeo was an Italian painter born at Brescia, and active in the 16th century. He painted an Incredulity of Saint Thomas for the church of St Thomas in Brescia.
