= Francesco Monachesi =

Italian painter

Francesco Monachesi (1817 in Macerata – ?) was an Italian painter, known for his portraits.

His father sent him to study at Rome under Tommaso Minardi, but after his parents died, he was forced to return to Macerata. There he taught at the Scuole Tecniche di Macerata. He is best known for his pen drawings and portraits, including in miniature. At the International Exhibition of Rome, he exhibited: La Concezione, and the Venus of Medici. He also painted in oil and a portrait dal vero on ivory, and a bust, also exposed at that event. Monachesi.
