= Attilio Stefanori =

Italian painter (1860–1911)

Attilio Stefanori (1860–1911) was an Italian painter, mainly working in watercolors and acquaforte etchings. He painted both landscapes, historic, and religious paintings.

== Biography ==
He was born and a resident in Rome, with a studio in Via Ripetta. He exhibits in 1883, in Rome, a watercolor depicting: Rebecca. In 1884 in Turin, Rachele and Cerberus; in 1887 at the National Artistic Exposition of Venice: Claudio Clan. At the 1905 Venice Biennale, he exhibited: I baci del mare, Paludi pontine, and Pineta di Castelfranco.
