= Tulio Moy =

Italian painter (1856–1894)

Tulio or Tullio Moy (Piacenza, September 27, 1856 – Piacenza, 1894) was an Italian painter, mainly of landscapes.

== Biography ==
He was a resident of Bologna for many years. He once studied with Cezanne. In 1880, at Turin, he exhibited: Sul finire d'autunno; in 1883 at Rome: Bizzarrie d'estate and Prime nebbie; in 1884 at Turin, he displayed Sull' Appennino and Estate; in 1886 at Milan: Ultime foglie; Mors et vita; in 1887 at Venice, he displayed: Brume autunnali; Fra gli abeti; In febbraio, where lo studio del vero accurato e maestrevolmente reso, si manifestava potente e gagliardo. Among other works: Mattino di primavera; Sul monte; Boscaglia; Giornata triste; Tramonto, and In ottobre.
