= Pietro Maselli =

Italian painter

Pietro Maselli (Turin, - Figino, Canton of Ticino, December 24, 1892) was an Italian painter, mainly of still lifes and landscapes, in oil and water color.

He was a resident of Turin, and later move to Switzerland. In 1880 at Turin exhibited: Il giorno onomastico; in 1881 at Milan, he exhibited two canvases of game (selvaggina), and another still-life. In 1884 at the Esposition of Turin del 1884, another canvases of hunted game and one titled: Un regalo.
