= Niccolò da Verona =

Italian painter

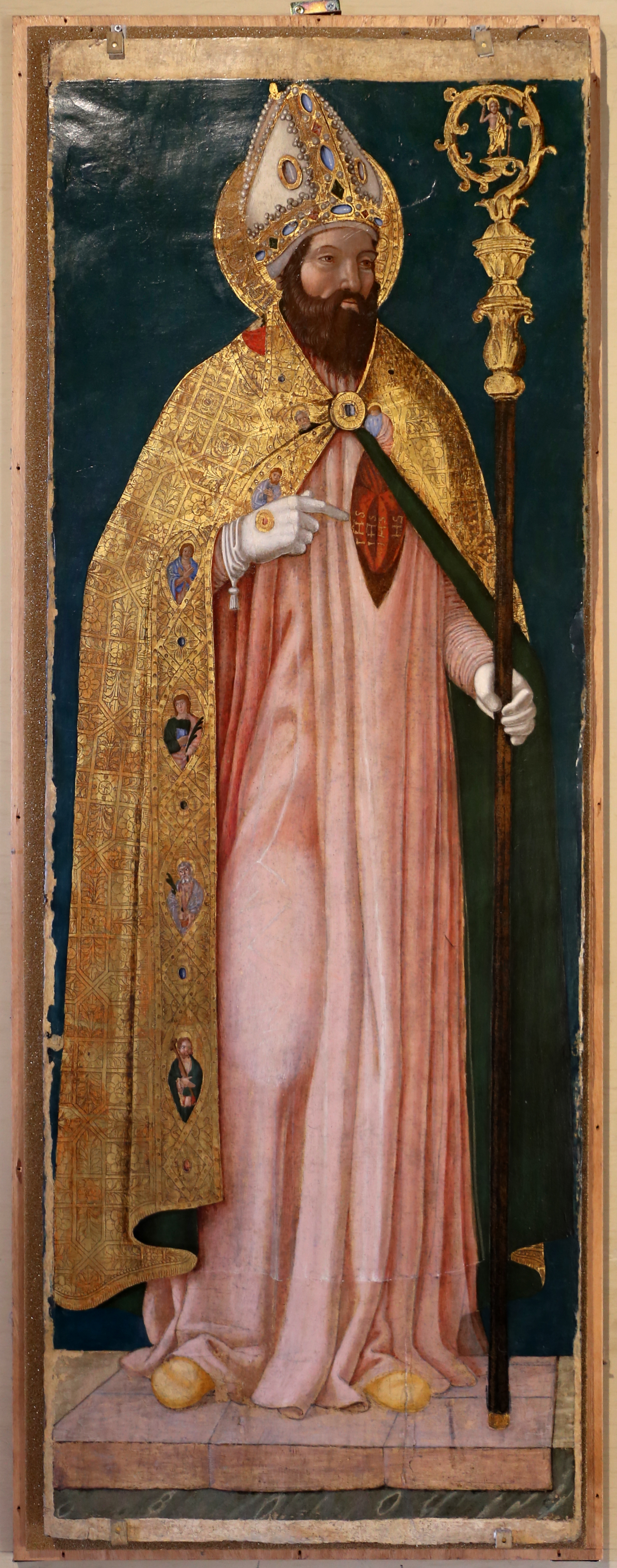
St. Ignatius, Mantua, palazzo Ducale

Niccolo da Verona (15th century) was an Italian painter of the Renaissance period. He painted a fresco of the Virgin with the Child and Saints in the Ognissanti at Mantua, is signed with this name, and dated 1461.
