= Pietro Ruzolone =

Italian painter

Pietro Ruzolone (active during the 15th and 16th centuries) was an Italian painter, active in Palermo. He was the contemporary and probably pupil of Vigilia. The Duomo of Termini possesses an altarpiece with the Crucifixion (1464) by this artist, side panels of the Virgin, Evangelists, and Mary Magdalene, the Pelican and Serpent, are on one side; with the Resurrection, and the symbols of the Evangelists, on the other. He is known to have been living up to 1517.
