= Luigi Serena =

Italian painter (1855–1911)

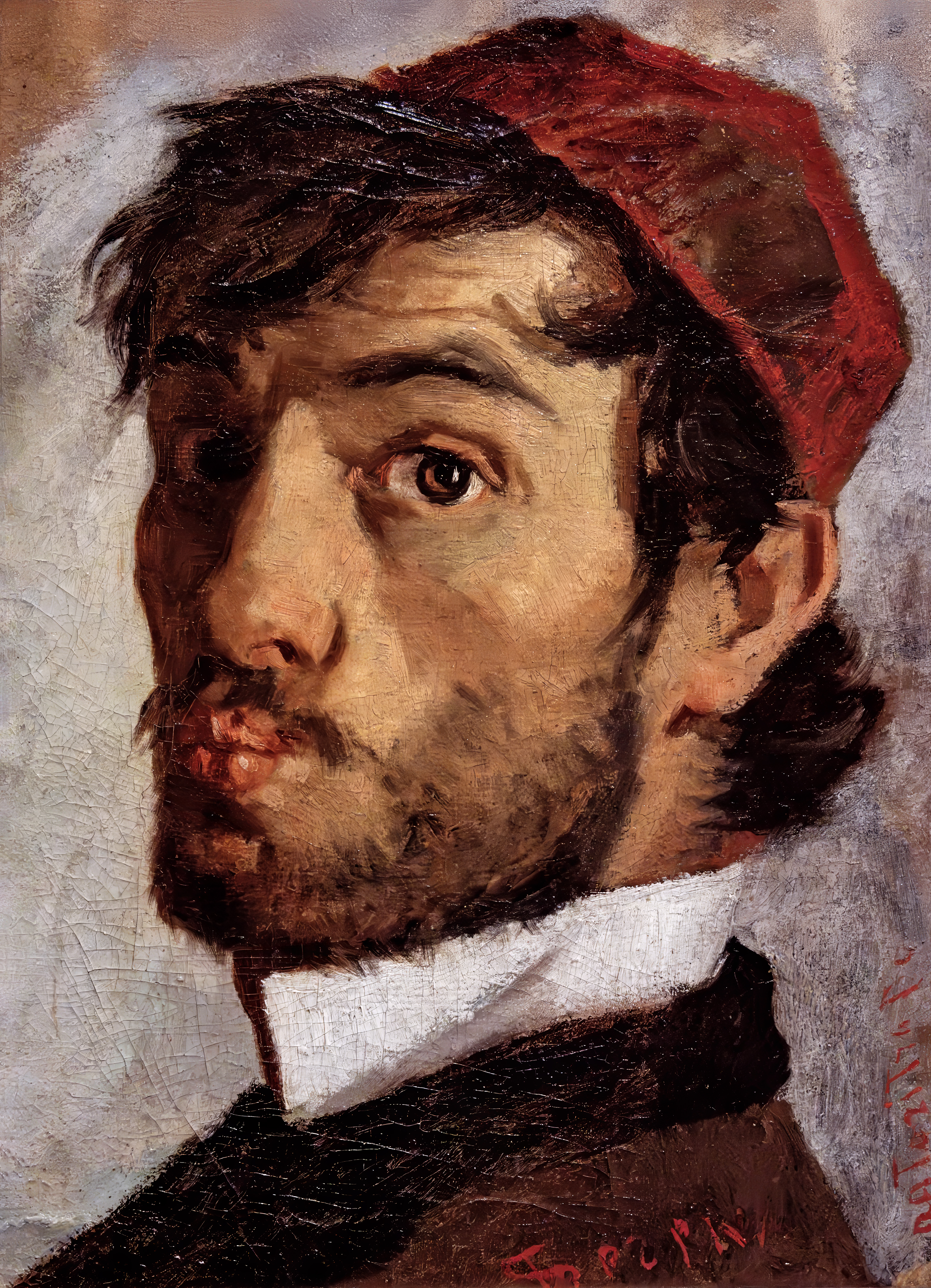
Luigi Serena - Self portrait 1876

Luigi Serena (Montebelluna, 1855 - Treviso, 1911) was an Italian painter.

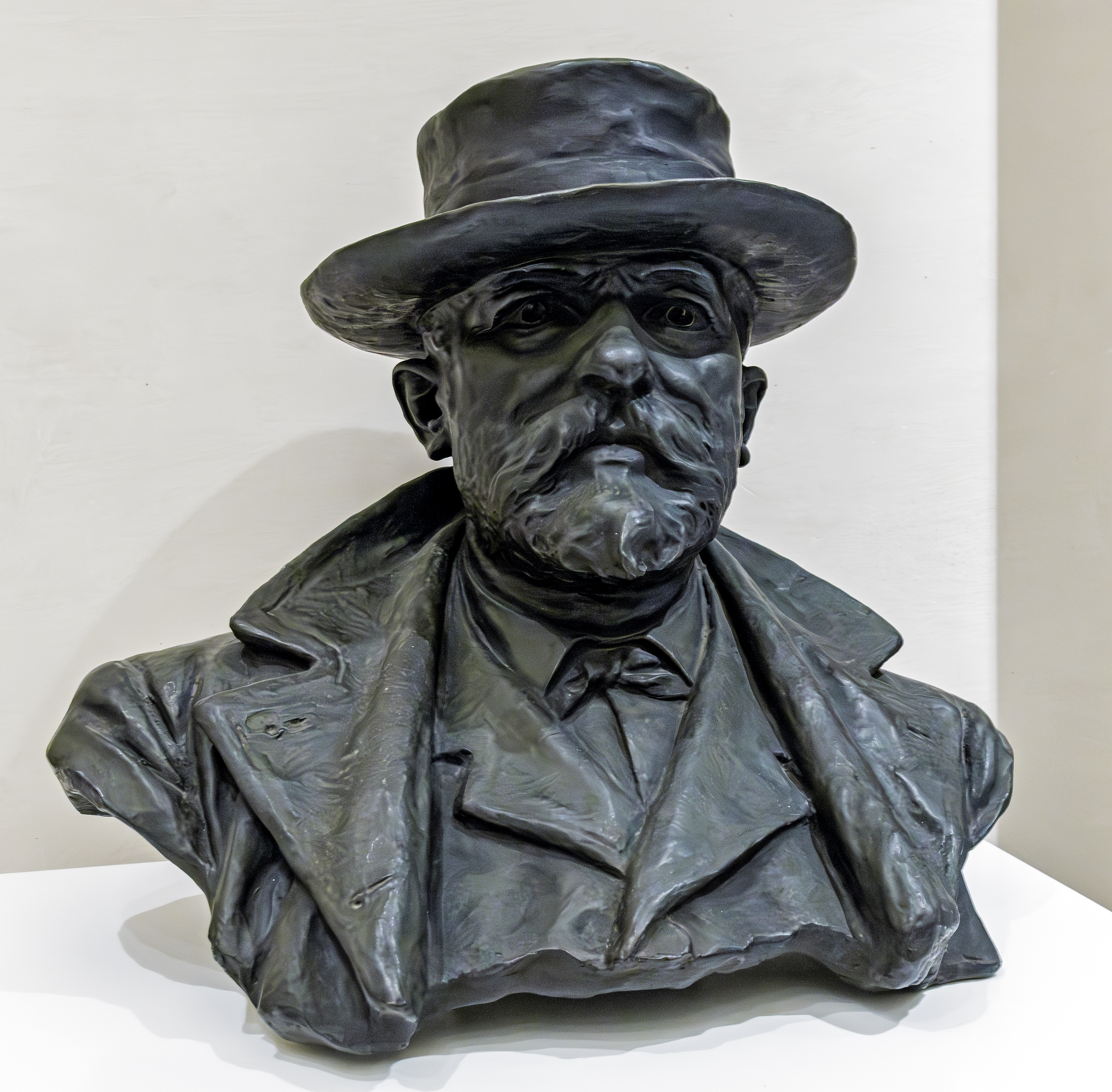
Bust of Luigi Serena by Silio Rossetto - Museo 'Luigi Bailo' Treviso

Born in the Veneto, resident in Treviso, he exhibited throughout Italy. In 1881 at Venice, he exhibited: Andemo a la sagra; Baruffa di donne; La morosa in collera; Dolci parole; Piazzetta e Molo of Venice. in 1883 in Milan: Pollivendola; Lassine el me filo. In 1883 at Turin: Pollivendola was again exhibited. Other works are: Femo pase; Piazzetta al molo. At the 1884 Exhibition of Fine Arts in Turin, he exhibited: Al Lavatoio. In 1886, at the Exposition for the Encouragement of Fine Arts in Florence, he displayed Innocenti.
