= Raffaele Rabbia =

Italian painter

Rafaelle Rabbia (17th century) was an Italian painter, mainly painting portraits. He was born in Marino, and active in 1610.
