= Giovanni Lombardo Calamia =

Italian painter

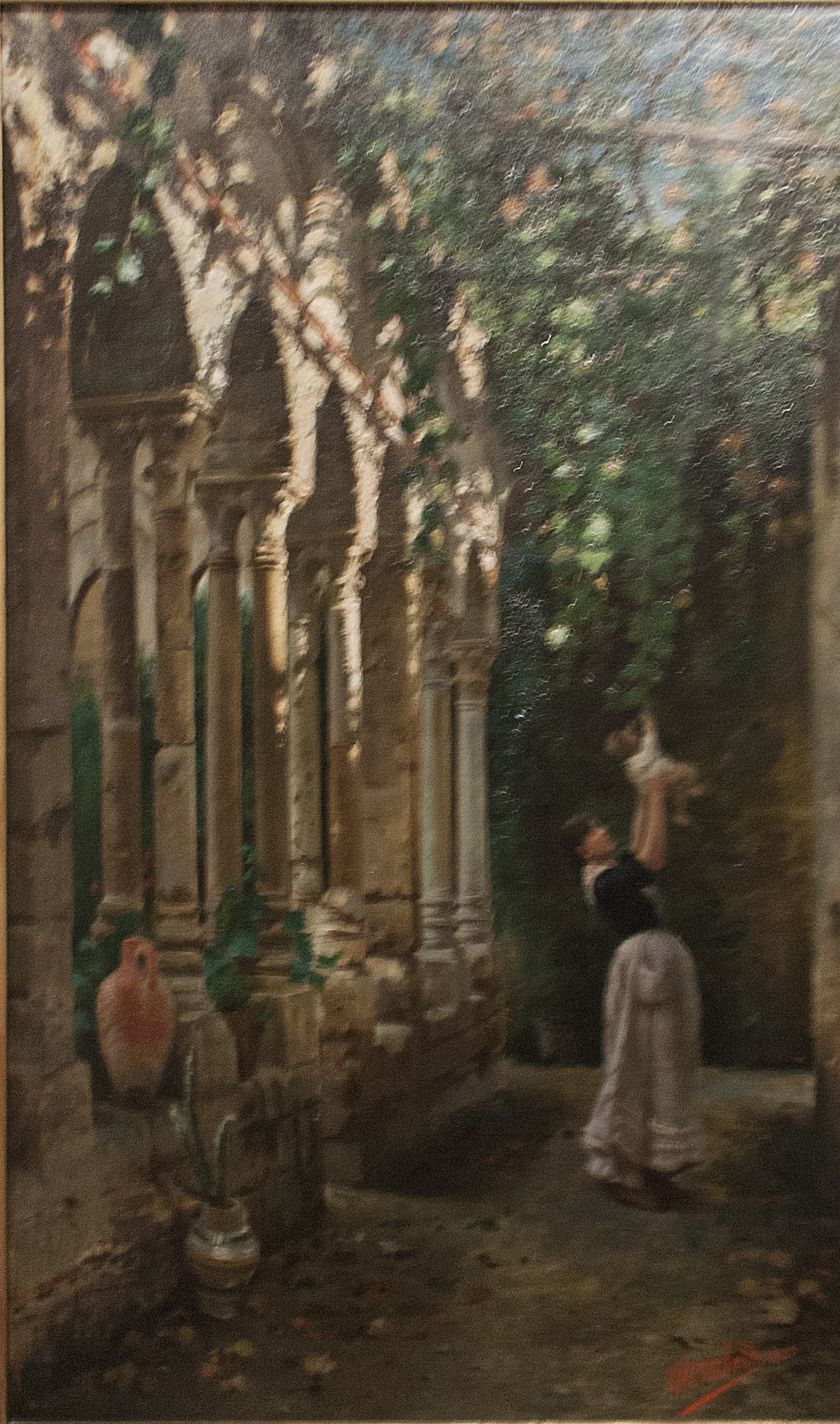
Chiostro di San Giovanni degli Eremiti

Giovanni Lombardo Calamia (Palermo, 1849 - after 1894) was an Italian painter, mainly depicting interior vedute.

== Biography ==
Among his works are: Catacombe dei Cappuccini a Palermo; Vecchio cortile; Un chiostro. He exhibited frequently at Naples, and at Turin, in 1880, again Catacombe and a Studio dal vero in Bocca di Falco, Sicily. At Rome, in 1883, he displayed: Vecchi ruderi and Verso l'ave.
