= Girolamo Nattino =

Italian painter (1842–1913)

- Born: 1842; Naples, Kingdom of the Two Sicilies
- Died: 1913; Naples, Italy
- Education: Academy of Fine Arts, Naples
- Known for: Painting
- Notable work: Rimembranze, Naples dalla marina di Portici, La prima Comunione
- Style: Genre scenes, Landscapes, Portraits, Still lifes

Girolamo Nattino (1842–1913) was an Italian painter, who depicted eclectic subjects, including genre, landscapes, and portraits.

== Biography ==
He studied ornamentation and design at the Academy of Fine Arts of Naples, under Giuseppe Mancinelli. He was a resident of Naples. In 1870 at Parma, he exhibited: Due montoni che pascolano, oil canvas and Frutta. In 1887 at Naples, he exhibited Rimembranze and Lucrezia Romana. In 1881 at Milan, he exhibited: Una filatrice and Venditore di mele (both genre pieces); Frutta and a Mezza (still-life); and a portrait of a woman. In 1883 to Milan and Rome, he sent: Presso il Granatello a Portici; Frutta e Fiori; Frutta e Avanzi Angioini a Monteleone di Calabria. At the General Italian Exposition of Fine Arts of Turin in 1884, he displayed: Marina di Resina; Naples da Portici; Contadinello di San Germano, and Roseo di Portici; at Venice, in 1887, Naples dalla marina di Portici; La prima Comunione and Norina. Among his other works are: Un Contadinello: A Forosella; Venditore di frutta; Marina di sera, and Spiaggia tirrena.
