= Enea Tornaghi =

Italian painter

Enea Tornaghi (1830 in Lombardy – after 1885) was an Italian painter.

He painted mainly literary subjects and genre works. He was a resident in Milan. Among his works are: Il paggio di Isabella, La lettera di invito, Di Ritorno dalla Serra dei Fiori, and Un brano dell' Ariosto. He collaborated with the metal engraver Angelo Cappuccio, providing compositions that were engraved in medals for the Italian Red Cross Medals in 1899. He also was known for his aptitude at portrait painting.
