= Ferdinando Partini =

Italian painter

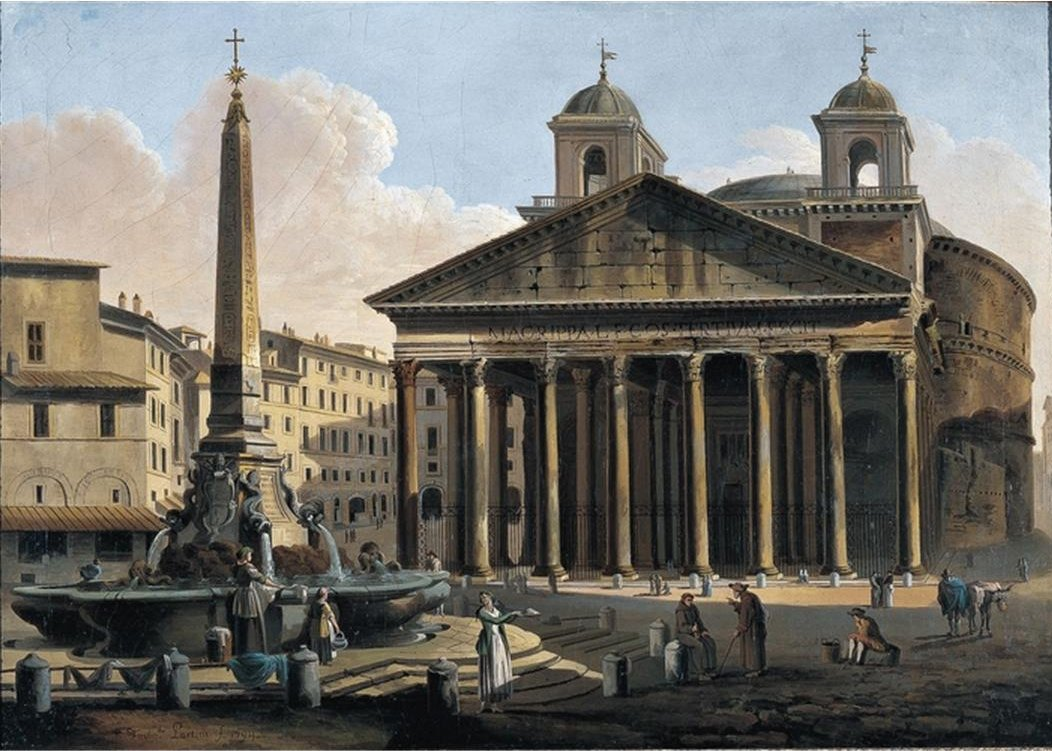
'View of the Pantheon', oil, 1794, Metropolitan Museum of Art

Ferdinando Partini was an Italian painter who was active in the 1790s. He is best known for his vedute of ancient buildings. His 1794 oil painting View of the Pantheon was featured in the exhibition Art of the Royal Court: Treasures in Pietre Dure from the Palaces of Europe at the Metropolitan Museum of Art along with a reproduction in pietre dure.
