= Giuseppe Raffaele Tessitore =

Italian painter

Giuseppe Raffaele Tessitore (Frignano Maggiore, near Caserta, February 21, 1861 - after 1916) was an Italian painter, mainly of landscapes and genre scenes.

He exhibited at the 1882 Promotrice of Naples: La mia cucina; in 1883, Fiorellino di Primavera, in 1885, Pace domestica and a Studio dal vero, In 1888, Mysterium and Testina (pastel work), In 1889, Fra i monti del Vomero, in 1890, In Terra di Lavoro and Guitar player; in 1891 con Li tetelle de Nannina, 14 marzo, Ritorno dalla rivista, Martedì in Albis al mio paese; and finally in 1896, the work Il pegno venduto.

In 1882 at the Mostre of Turin, he displayed La brava contadinella, and in 1884, at the same exhibition, he displayed Amore ai polli. In 1884 and 1885 at the Milan exhibition, he exhibited Darwinismo- marina and Macchiette dal vero. These paintings were also shown in Rome during 1886–87. In 1883 at the Exposition of Italian-Spanish art, he displayed Giovane pollaia.
