= Santa Maria della Misericordia =

Santa Maria della Misericordia may refer to:

- Abbazia della Misericordia, Venice
- Santa Maria della Misericordia, Correggio
- Santa Maria della Misericordia, Falconara Marittima
