= Giuseppe Orazio Capretti =

Italian painter (1641–1725)

Giuseppe Orazio Capretti (1641 - 7 March 1725) was an Italian painter.

== Biography ==
He was born in Almè in the Province of Bergamo. He moved to Rome in 1673 to pursue training. Returning to Lombardy, he painted mainly sacred subjects. He also painted for the church of San Francesco in Correggio. He died in the latter town.
