= Civic Museum il Correggio =

Museum in Correggio, Emilia-Romagna, Italy

Coordinates: 44°46′13″N 10°46′49″E

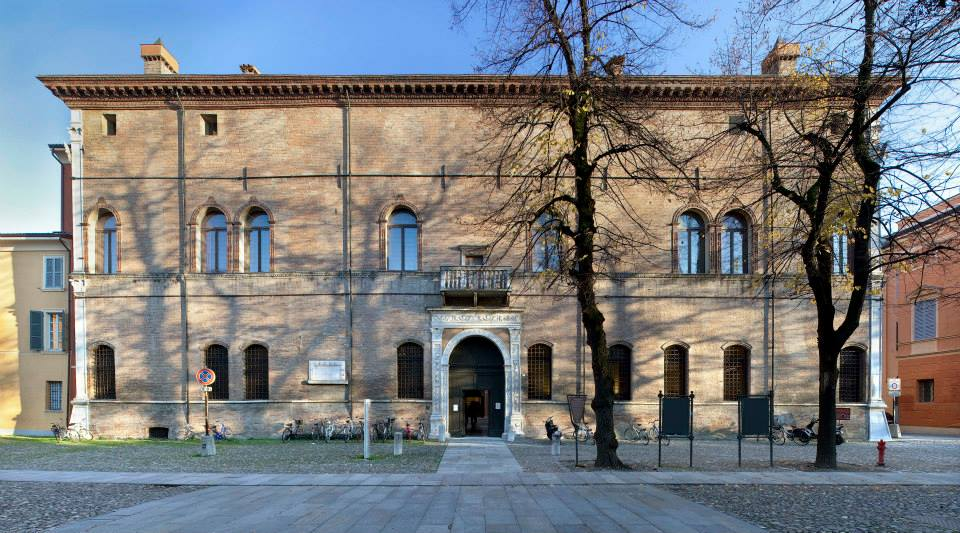
The Museo il Correggio in 2014

The Civic Museum il Correggio (Museo Civico il Correggio) is a museum in Correggio, Emilia-Romagna, Italy. It is located in the piano nobile of the former Palazzo dei Principi.

== History of the palace ==
The Palazzo dei Principi was initially constructed starting 1508, as the home of Francesca di Brandeburgo, widow of the Count Borso da Correggio. After the end of the Correggio family, the palace became the home of ministers appointed by the Este rulers. By the 19th century, the palace had become dilapidated, and the entire east wing was razed to build the Contarelli orphanage. A major reconstruction and refurbishment was commissioned by the Commune and pursued under the architect Guido Zucchini from 1925 to 1927. Further refurbishments did not come until 1966–68, including a reorganization of the historic archives, and in 1971 with the opening of a new library.

The museum was founded in 1995, only to close the following October 1996 due to a local earthquake. The archive and library were not both restored until 2004.

== History of the collections ==
With the plunder and dispersal of the art and furnishings of the Princes of Collegio, the first collection that the commune could assemble was a series of Flemish tapestries that were protected. In 1786, these were exhibited in the buildings formerly belonging to the Padri Scolopi. In 1813, the commune was able to collect a number of historical portraits from various families. They would assemble collections of works by local engravers such as Giuseppe Asioli, Samuele Jesi, Delfino Delfini (1802–1843), and Francesco Redenti. In 1859, the mayor Ferdinando Asioli, reorganized a series of canvasses that were copies of works by Antonio Correggio, previously owned by Ercole Scarabelli. Asioli was also able to obtain a large series of engravings by Paolo Toschi. Other works would enter the collection after the suppression of religious orders and from deconsecrated local churches.

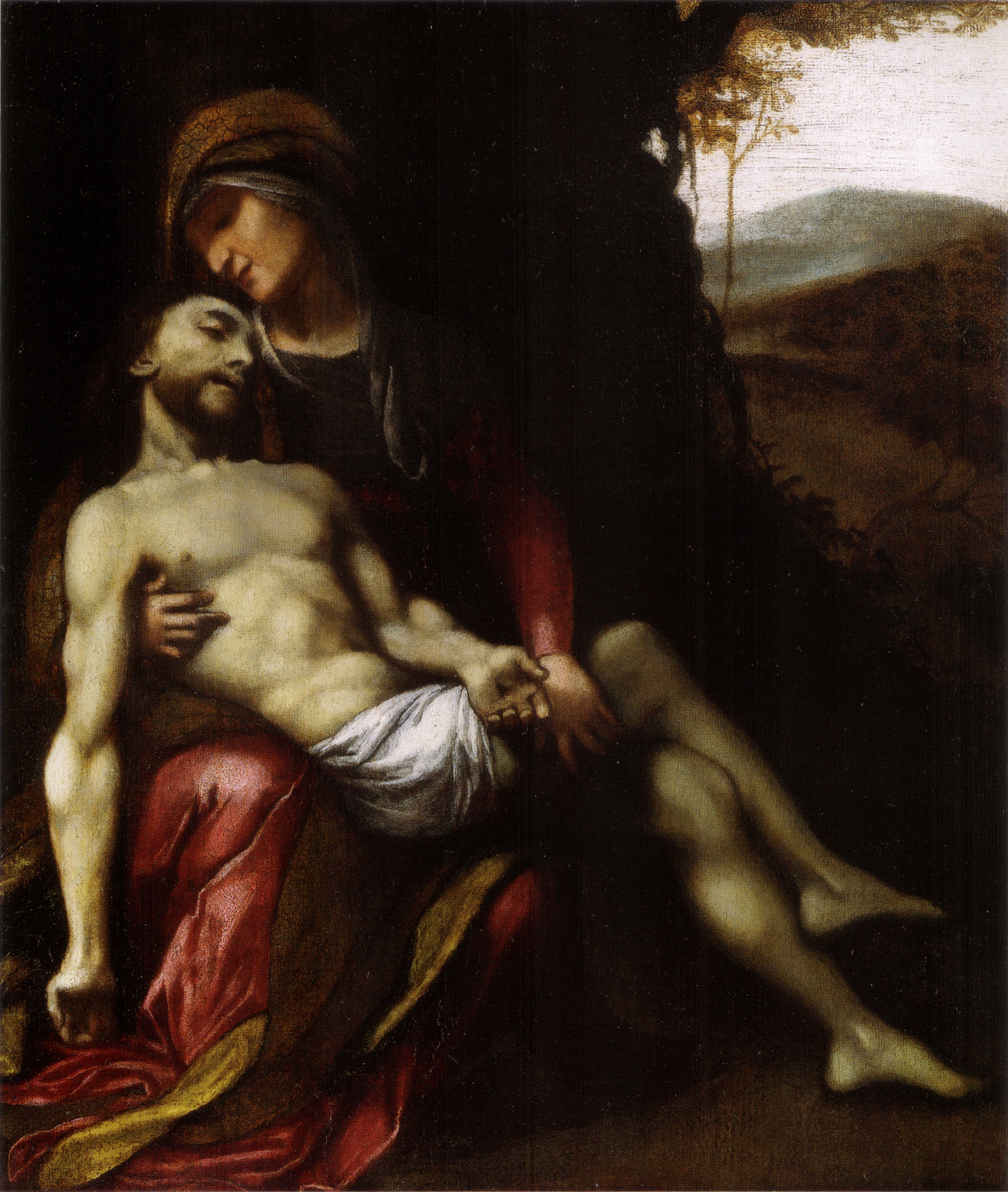
Pietà, by Correggio

Among highlights of the present collections are

- il Redentore (1493) by Andrea Mantegna
- Volto di Cristo, Pietà and a drawing by Correggio
- Madonna del Rosario by Francesco Madonnina
- Flemish tapestries (Late 15th century) woven in Brussels in the workshop of Cornelius Mattens
- Coin collection of the Correggio mint
- Fortepiano owned by Bonifazio Asioli
