= Giuseppe Asioli =

Italian engraver (1783–1845)

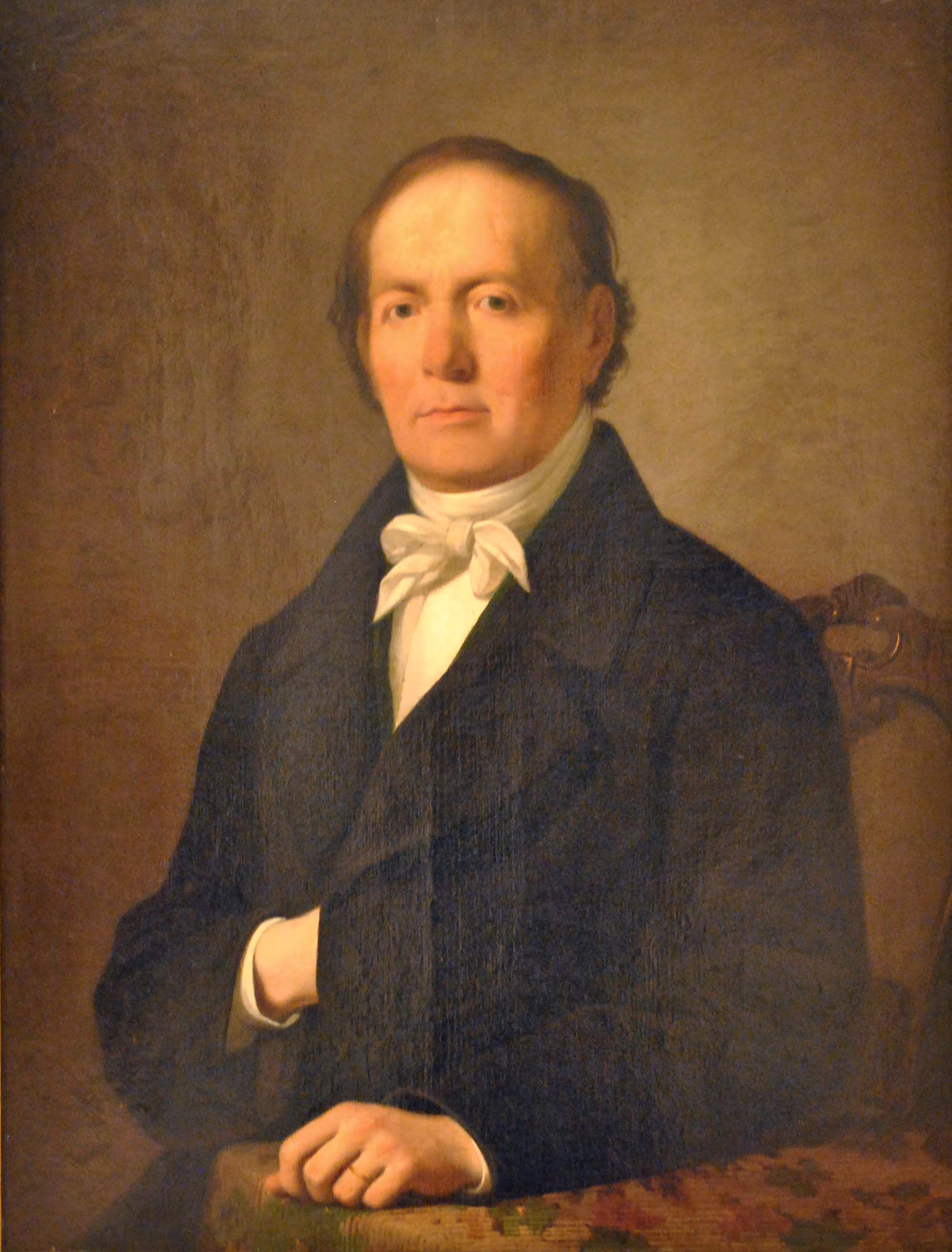
Giuseppe Asioli; portrait by his son, Luigi

Giuseppe Asioli (24 August 1783 – 10 January 1845) was an Italian engraver.

== Biography ==
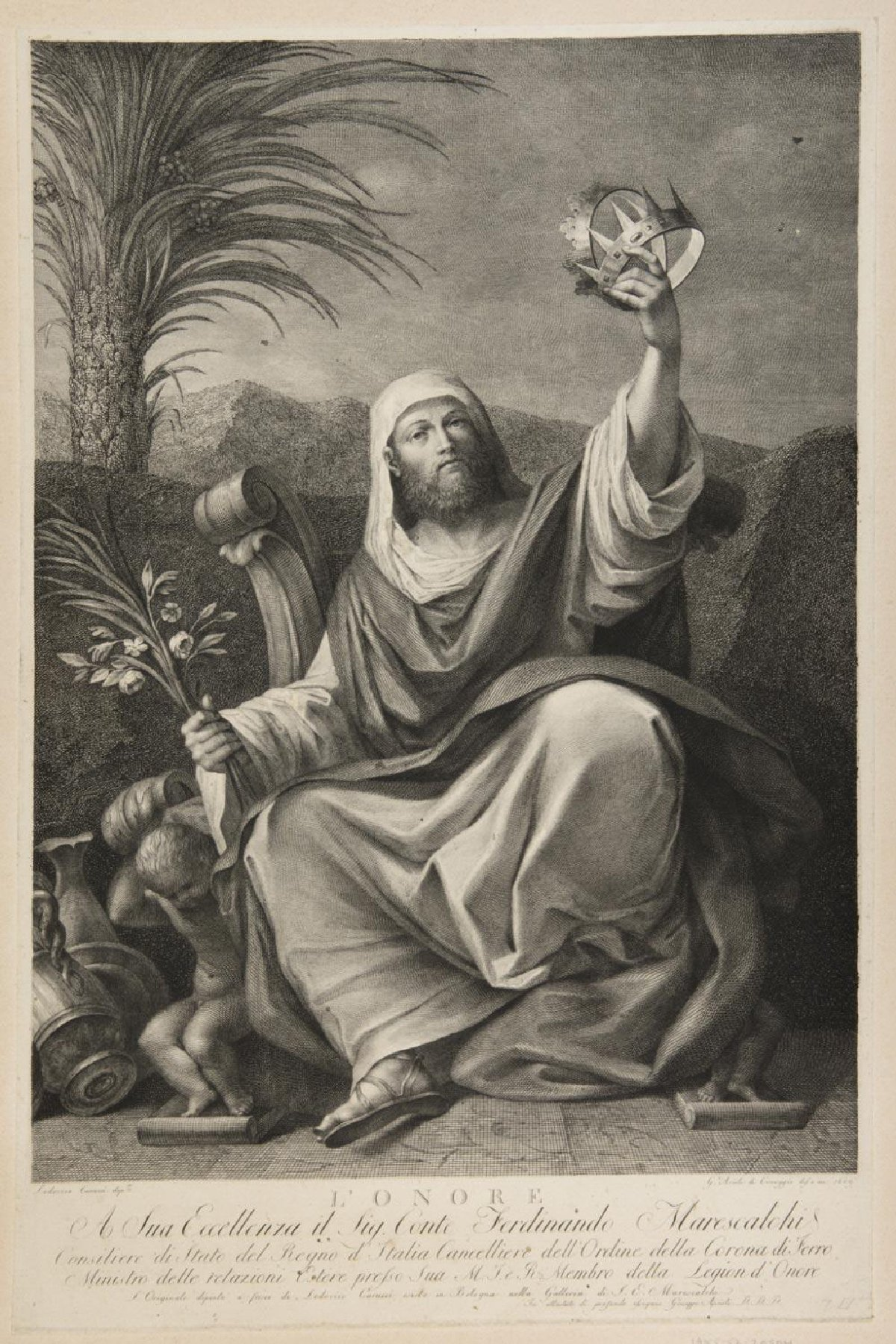
Honor (after Lodovico Carracci)

He was born on 24 August 1783, in Correggio, to watchmaker Quirino Asioli and Benedetta (née Giovannelli). Three of his brothers became musicians: Bonifazio, a composer, Luigi, a singer, and Giovanni, an organist. Giuseppe himself began as a harpsichordist, but developed an interest in copper engraving.

After his father's death in 1801, he moved to Bologna to attend the engraving school operated by Francesco Rosaspina. There, he became friends and a lifelong professional associate of Giulio Tomba and Samuele Jesi. At first, he created pen drawings of pastoral subjects. His first published prints date from 1802 and 1803. They feature angels, after works by his major influence, the Flemish engraver Gérard Edelinck.

In 1811, he achieved success by receiving the "Grand Prix for Fine Arts", established in 1785 by Peter von Biron, the last Duke of Courland. His winning entry was an engraved reproduction of "Medea Rejuvenating Aeson", from a painting by Pellegrino Tibaldi.

Three years later his brother Luigi, who had become a successful singer in London, invited him there. His engravings of works by Italian Renaissance artists proved to be very popular. The climate there proved to be bad for his health however so, in 1816, he returned to Italy, where he assisted Rosaspina on one of his projects. In 1818, he married Rosaspina's daughter, Enrichetta. Their son, Luigi, also became an artist.

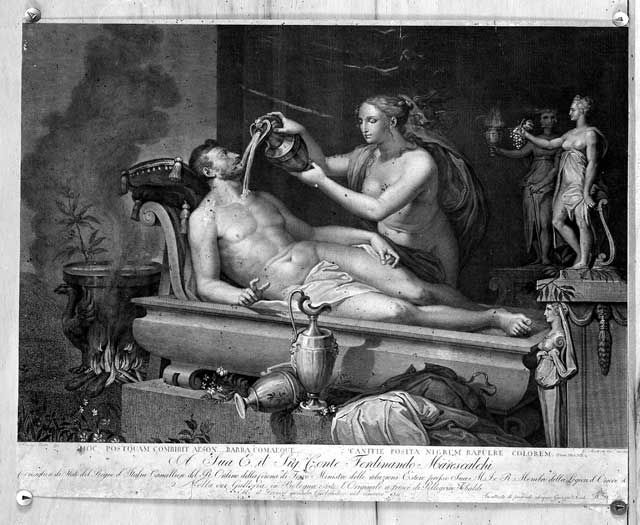
Medea Rejuvenating Aeson (after Tibaldi)

In 1820, he was named Professor of Engraving at the Accademia di Belle Arti di Modena. He held the seat for twenty-two years while continuing his artistic activity; producing numerous engraved portraits of royalty and other notables. Around 1840, he became afflicted with paralysis, possibly from a stroke, but was able to receive a government pension. He officially retired in 1842 and returned to his hometown, where he died on 10 January 1845, aged 61, in Correggio.
