= Luigi Asioli =

Italian painter

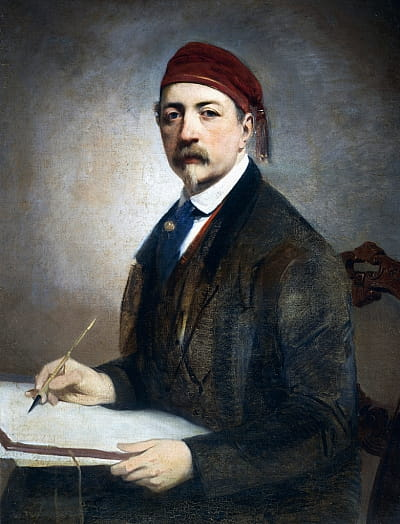
Self-portrait (date unknown)

Luigi Asioli (16 December 1817, Correggio – 15 August 1877, Modena) was an Italian Neoclassical painter.

== Biography ==
He was born to the engraver, Giuseppe Asioli, and his wife Enrichetta née Rosaspina; daughter of the Bolognese engraver Francesco Rosaspina. His uncle Bonifazio was a well-known composer. After displaying some artistic talent, his grandfather brought him to Bologna to begin his training.

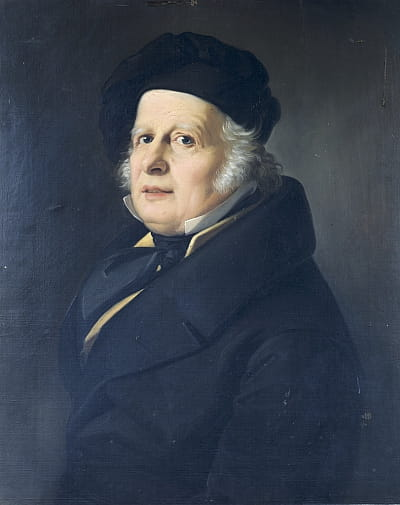
Professor Chini

From 1828 to 1837, he was a student at the Accademia di Belle Arti di Modena, where he specialized in drawing from life. He returned to Bologna to complete his studies at the Pontificia Accademia di Belle Arti; obtaining several prizes for his work. He was especially noted for painting a portrait of Professor Luigi Chini in a single day.

In 1839, he went to Florence and made several stays there through 1846, to perfect his technique, working with Giuseppe Bezzuoli. In between, he created several large altarpieces and frescoes in his hometown, at the parish church of Villa Dosdondo, the Confraternity of San Sebastian, the church at the Monastery of Santa Chiara, Carpi, and the Basilica di San Quirino.

He settled in Modena, where the painter Adeodato Malatesta had arranged a position for him at the Accademia. Early in 1848, he was named a professor of Drawing there, but almost immediately became an active participant in the Revolution; fighting in Venice, Genoa and Milan. After hostilities had ceased, he returned to the Accademia and was there until 1859. That year, Austria declared war on the Kingdom of Sardinia and he volunteered for service. He was briefly stationed in Brescello, but saw no action.

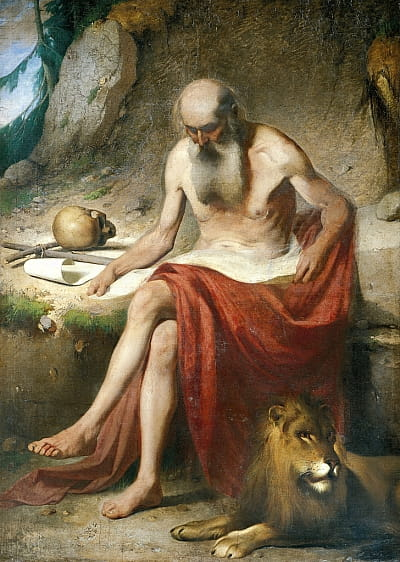
Saint Jerome, the Penitent

Upon being discharged, he married Clorinda Romei, from Reggio Emilia. The following year. he was back at the Accademia, as a professor of painting, creating medals, sketches and portraits in addition to his teaching duties.

Beginning in 1867, he was often seriously ill. By 1875, he had developed meningitis. Though weak and heavily dependent on the support of his students, he continued to teach as much as possible. He finally succumbed to apoplexy in 1877, aged fifty-nine.
