= Madonna della Misericordia =

Madonna della Misericordia may refer to:

- Madonna della Misericordia, Petriolo, church building in Petriolo, Italy
- Santa Maria della Misericordia, Falconara Marittima, former church building in Falconara Marittim, Italy
- Santa Maria della Misericordia, Macerata, church building in Macerata, Italy

== See also ==
- Virgin of Mercy
