= San Sebastiano, Correggio =

Catholic church in Reggio Emilia province, Italy

Coordinates: 44°46′19″N 10°46′46″E

San Sebastiano is a Roman Catholic church located on Piazza Garibaldi in the historic center of the town of Correggio, province of Reggio Emilia, region of Emilia-Romagna, Italy.

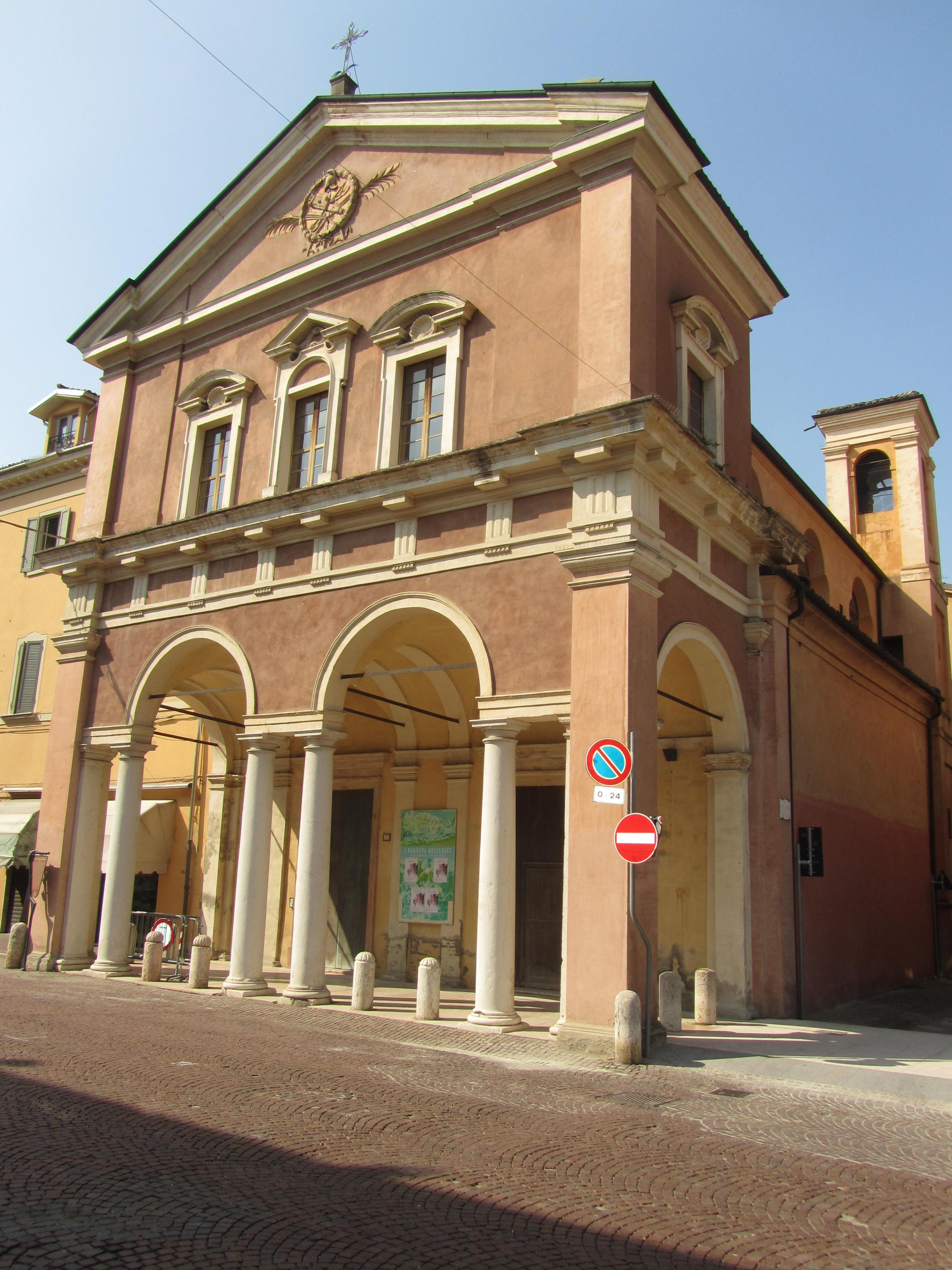
Church and portico

== History ==
The church, dedicated to St Sebastian, was completed by the Antica Confraternita di San Sebastiano under the patronage of Camillo di Correggio. Construction took place between 1591 and 1593. The bell tower and the front portico were added between 1641 and 1667. The confraternity was suppressed in 1797, and the church sold at auction in 1812. It was restored to cult in 1830.

The façade has a sober two-story façade, almost neoclassical in style, with three awkward windows in the second floor with the middle one having a different pediment. In the tympanum is a bas-relief with the coat of arms of the confraternity.

The interior nave has three chapels on either side. The artworks have been moved to the local civic museum. The church has been closed in the 20th century, but restorations in the 1990s, allowed the site to be used for conferences and meetings.
