= Samuele Jesi =

Italian engraver

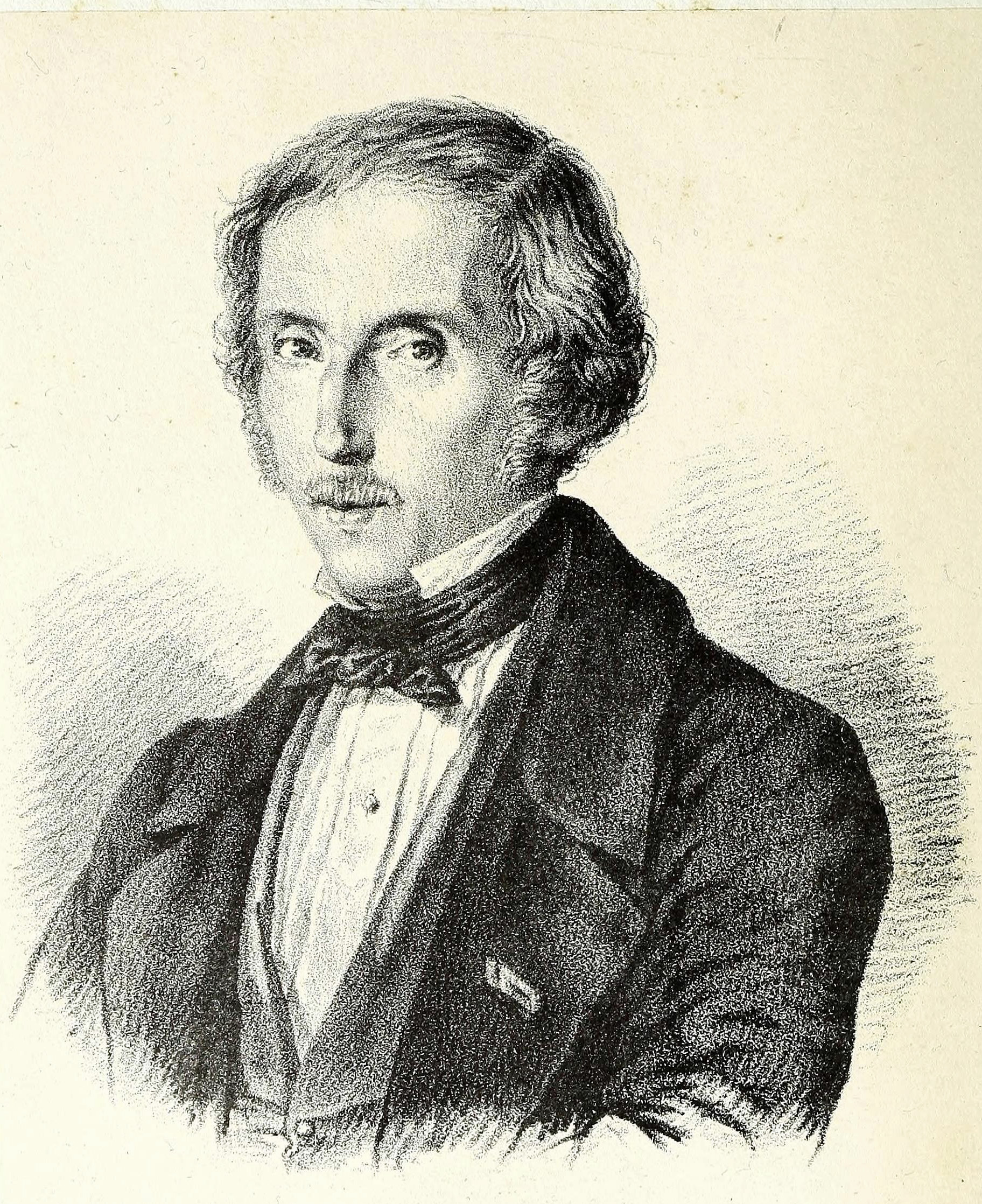
Samuele Jesi (artist unknown)

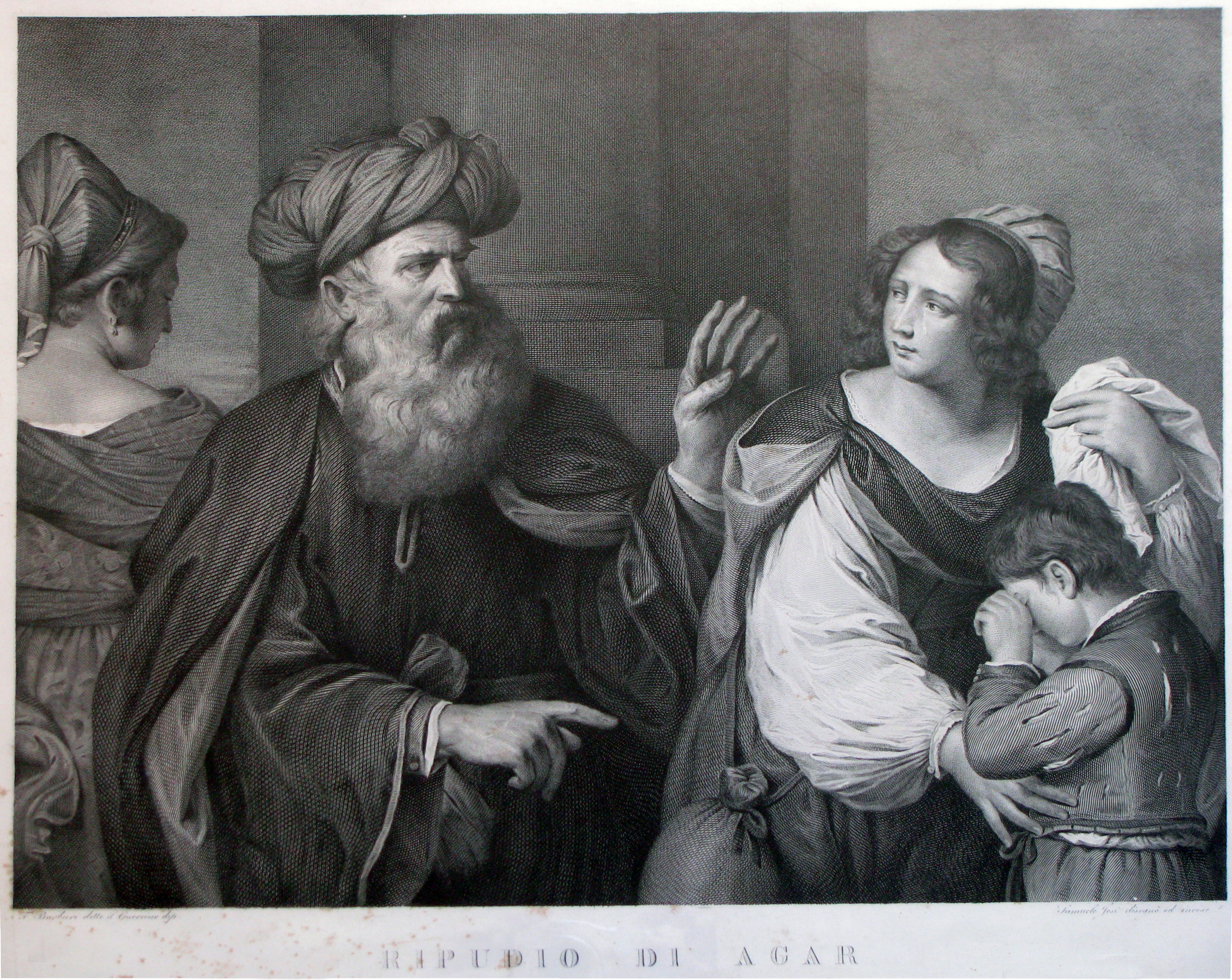
The Repudiation of Hagar

Samuele Beniamino Jesi (4 September 1788 – 17 January 1853) was an Italian engraver.

== Biography ==
He was born in Correggio of Jewish ancestry. Orphaned as a young man, he was entrusted with the care of his even younger brothers, while attending the Hebrew University of Carpi. As a result, he was forced to seek financial assistance from the municipality and local charities to complete his education. During that time, he developed an interest in drawing. From 1806 to 1808, he took some classes at the Academy of Fine Arts in Modena. Then, largely freed of his family responsibilities, he became a pupil of the engraver Francesco Rosaspina, at the Academy of Fine Arts of Bologna.

From 1809 to 1810, he was seriously ill and had to interrupt his training. His doctors concluded that the climate in Bologna was bad for him, so he moved to Milan in 1811. There, he studied with Giuseppe Longhi at the Brera Academy. In 1818, he established a relationship with several publishers, producing illustrations that would provide much of his income. His slow, meticulous work, combined with periods of inactivity due to a recurring illness, resulted in his output being relatively small.

In 1821, he won a major award from the Brera Academy for "The Repudiation of Hagar", engraved after a painting by Guercino. In 1825, he moved to Florence, eventually residing in the Piazza de' Mozzi, belonging to his friend, the Marquis Torrigiani. He also became a frequent visitor to the local salons; notably at the Gabinetto Vieusseux, established by the Genevan writer and publisher Giovan Pietro Vieusseux.

He produced two major works in 1834: "The Madonna with St. John and St. Stephen", from a painting by Fra Bartolomeo in the Cathedral of Lucca, and a group portrait after Raphael, depicting Pope Leo X with Cardinals Luigi de' Rossi and Giulio de' Medici, who later became Pope Clement VII. The latter was published in Paris by Goupil & Cie, and presented at the Salon in 1843. While in Paris, overseeing the process, he was elected a corresponding member of the Académie des Beaux-Arts, and received the ribbon of the Legion of Honor.

In 1846, following a long illness, he began his final large work: an engraving of the "Lord's Supper". Originally attributed to Raphael, it has since been linked to Perugino. It took him almost three years to complete the drawing. He died before finishing the engraving. His death was in 1853 in Florence.

== Sources ==
- Biography of Jesi by Federico Trastulli from the Dizionario Biografico degli Italiani @ Treccani
- Quirino Bigi, Intorno all'incisore Samuele Jesi da Correggio, Editore Luigi Giacomo Pirola, 1860. Online
- Laura Giannoccolo, Samuele Jesi (1788-1853) incisore, Correggio. Areastampa, 2007.
- Laura Giannoccolo, "A proposito di Samuele Jesi: tre disegni, una litografia e la storia di un cane", in: Paragone, 2009
