= Santuario della Madonna della Rosa, Correggio =

Catholic church in Reggio Emilia province, Italy

Coordinates: 44°46′20.0″N 10°46′31.4″E

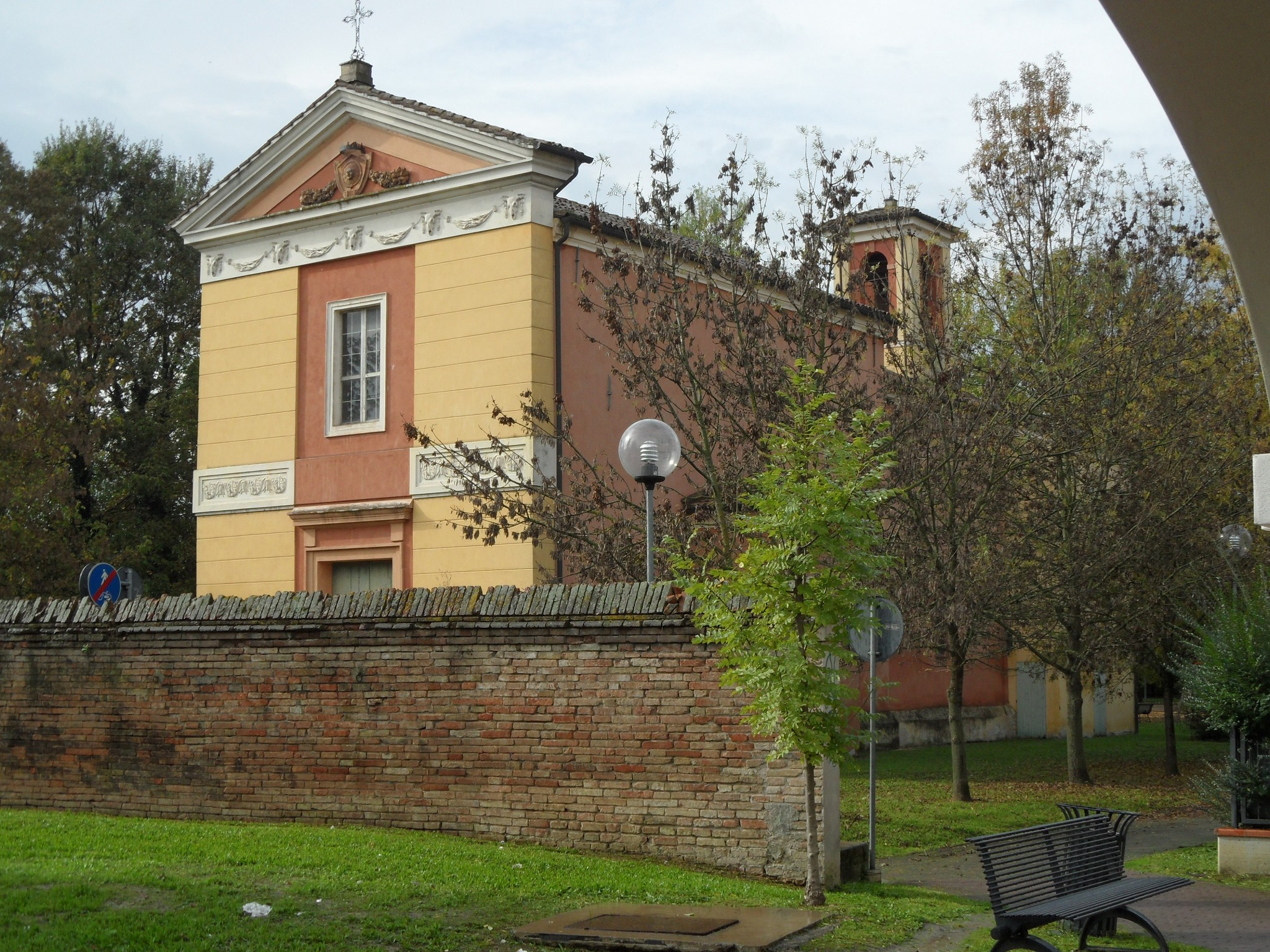
Madonna della Rosa (Correggio).jpg

The Sanctuary of the Madonna della Rosa is a Roman Catholic church located on Viottolo Madonna della Rosa in the town of Correggio, province of Reggio Emilia, region of Emilia-Romagna, Italy.

== History ==
The small church arose over time just outside the 16th century walls of the city. In 1440, a chapel dedicated to St Ursula was erected under the patronage of Giberto da Correggio. In 1496, Nicolò da Correggio and his wife, Cassandra Colleoni, founded a convent of nuns (Corpus Domini) to which this chapel adjacent. During a siege by the Este, the monastery was destroyed due to its position near the walls, but the chapel was spared. The chapel had an adjacent room with a bas-relief depicting the Madonna della Rosa. Veneration of this image gained fervor and by 1607, miracles began to be attributed to the image.

This led ultimately to the erection of a larger votive church in 1625, patronized by Prince Siro di Camillo of Correggio as an ex voto. Consecration took place in 1626, when the miraculous bas-relief was moved to the present site, above the main altar in the presbytery. The Madonna is viewed as the protector of the town. The church was restored in 2000, and open to guided tours.
