= San Giuseppe Calasanzio, Correggio =

Church building in Correggio, Italy

Coordinates: 44.772369°N 10.778643°E

San Giuseppe Calasanzio is a Roman Catholic church located on Via Bernieri in the historic center of the town of Correggio, province of Reggio Emilia, region of Emilia-Romagna, Italy. The church was deconsecrated in 1972, and was damaged by the 1996 earthquake.

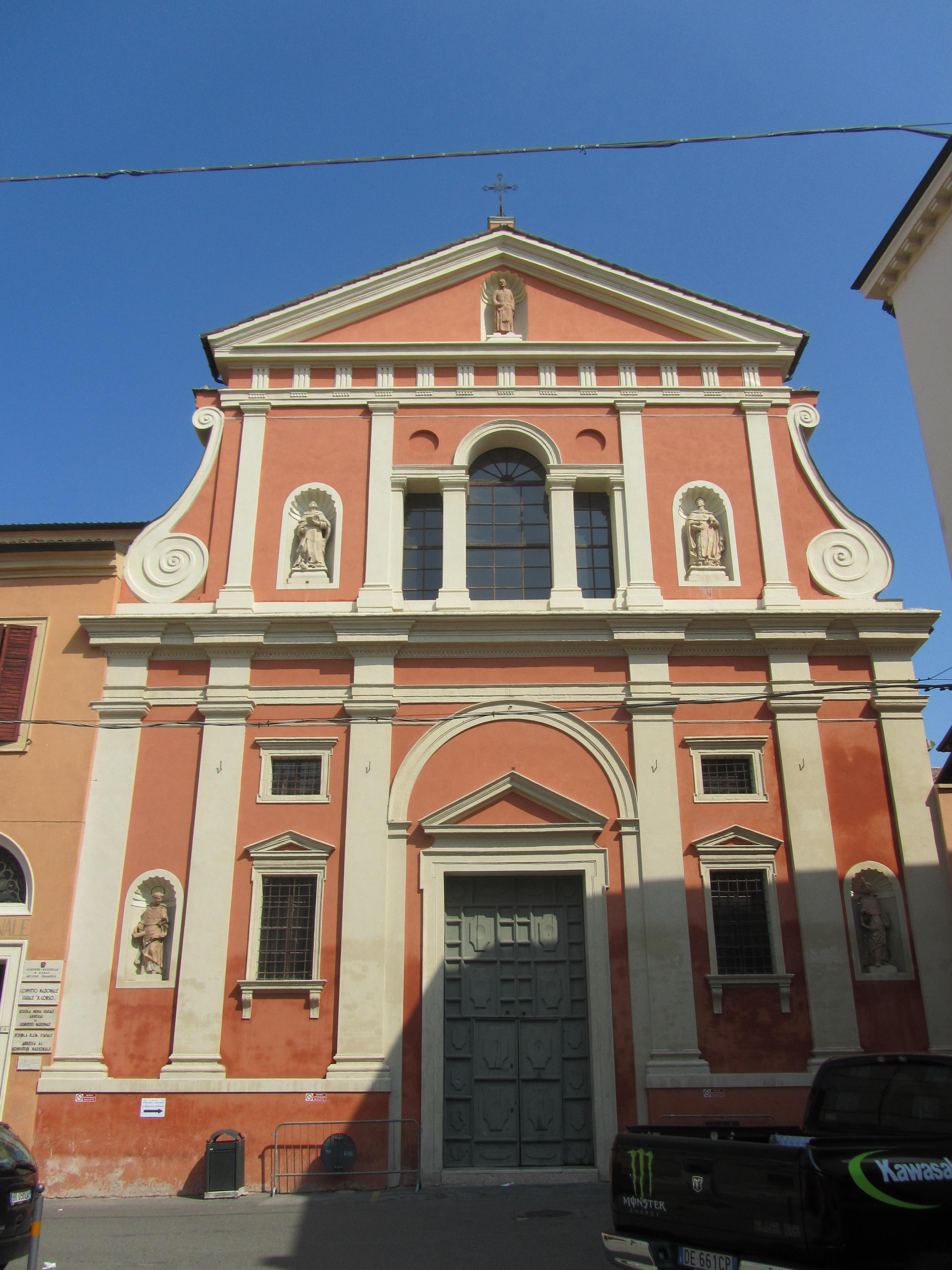
San Giuseppe Calasanzio façade

== History ==
The church was erected in 1567, initially dedicated to St Dominic and affiliated with an adjacent Dominican order monastery. At that era, the church abutted the city walls. The present dedication to St Joseph Calasanz derives from the Piarist who officiated at the church from 1783 to 1810.

The layout is that of a Post-Tridentine late-Renaissance-style, with a long nave with five chapels on the right and four chapels on the left, a short transept and a deep apse. The altar of the left transept is dedicated to the Madonna del Rosario. Other altars are decorated with stucco and scagliola. The bell tower was erected in 1613. The roof of the belfry is a truncated pyramid, a shape acquired after damage from the 1832 earthquake.

Among the interior decorations, the altarpiece in the third chapel on the left, once depicted a Beata Vergine delle Grazie. The icon was moved to replace the altarpiece in the chapel once dedicated to St Dominic. The original main altarpiece depicts the Assumption of the Virgin and was commissioned by cardinal Girolamo Bernieri around 1600 and painted by Federico Zuccari. The painting is now in the apse of the Reggio Emilia Cathedral. In 1783, this altarpiece was replaced with a painting depicting Beato Giuseppe Calasanzio in Glory and Miracles of the Blessed Calasanzio (1784) by Giovanni Filiberto Pagani. While this painting is still in this church, most of the other altarpieces are now exhibited in the Civic Museum of Correggio.
