= Rest on the Flight into Egypt with Saint Francis =

Painting by Correggio, c. 1520

The Rest on the Flight into Egypt with Saint Francis
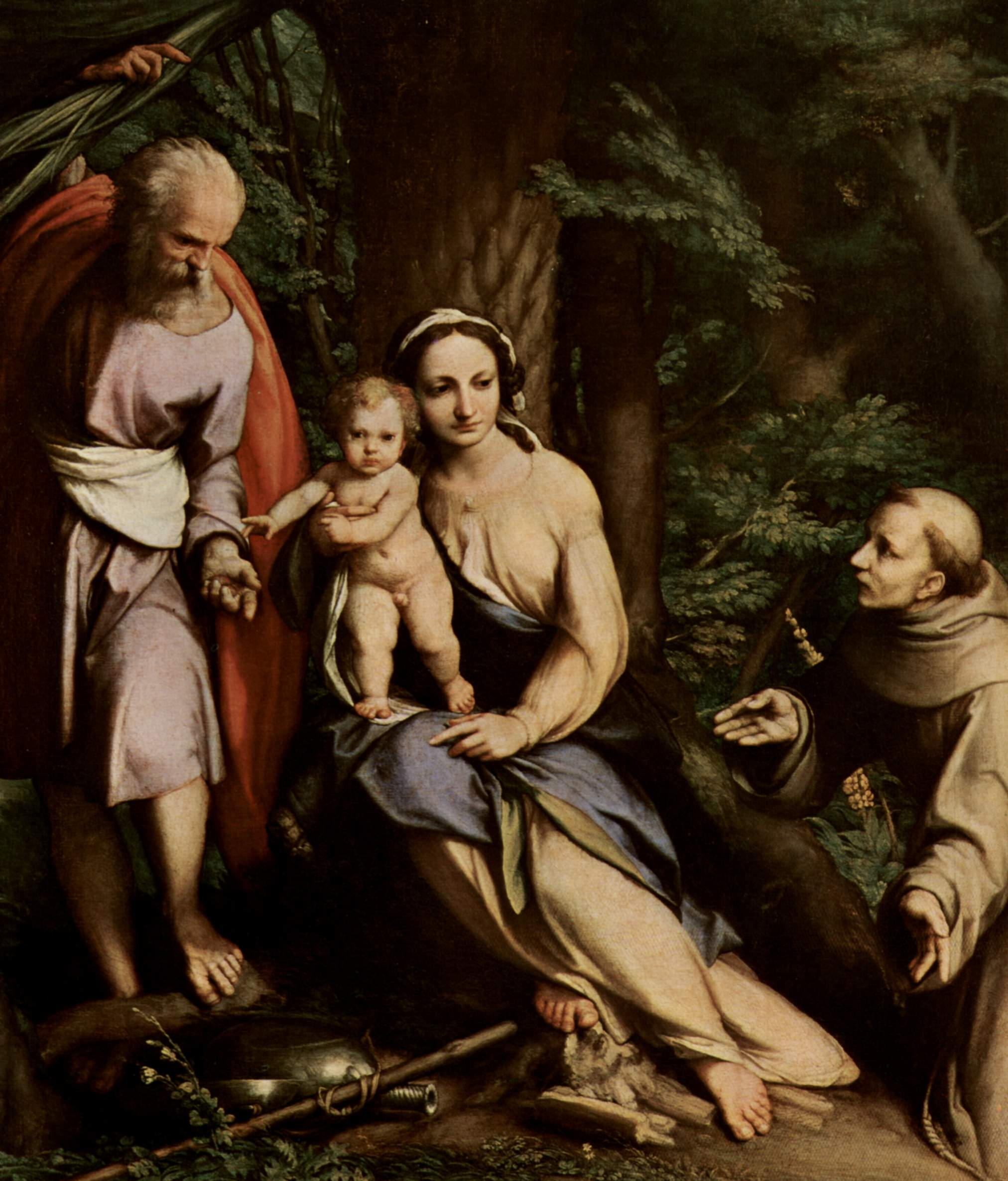
- Artist: Correggio
- Year: c. 1520
- Medium: Oil on canvas
- Dimensions: 123.5 cm × 106.5 cm (48.6 in × 41.9 in)
- Location: Uffizi, Florence

The Rest on the Flight into Egypt with Saint Francis is a painting by the Italian Renaissance master Correggio, dated to c. 1520 and now in the Uffizi Gallery of Florence. The Rest on the Flight into Egypt was a popular subject in art.

== History ==
The painting, once attributed to Federico Barocci, is now unanimously assigned to Correggio. It has been linked to the testament of jurist Francesco Munari who, in 1520, left money to the church of San Francesco in the town of Correggio for the decoration of the Immaculate Conception Chapel, where he wanted to be buried.

The work remained in the church until 1638, when Duke Francesco I d'Este moved his collections to Modena and replaced it with a copy by Jean Boulanger. In 1649 it was acquired by Ferdinando II de' Medici, in exchange for the Sacrifice of Isaac by Andrea del Sarto, and was thenceforth located at the Uffizi.

== Description ==
The painting is inspired to an episode of Jesus' childhood narrated in the Gospel of Pseudo-Matthew. During their flight from Egypt, the Holy Family stopped to rest under a palm tree. The latter bent itself to offer them its fruit and water appeared from its roots. Mary is portrayed in the middle, with the child on her knees. Joseph, on the left, is giving fruits to Jesus. On the right is Saint Francis of Assisi, present in the scene as a homage to the donor (who was eponymous of the saint), or the church.
