= Teresa Bandettini =

Italian dancer, composer of extemporaneous verse and poet

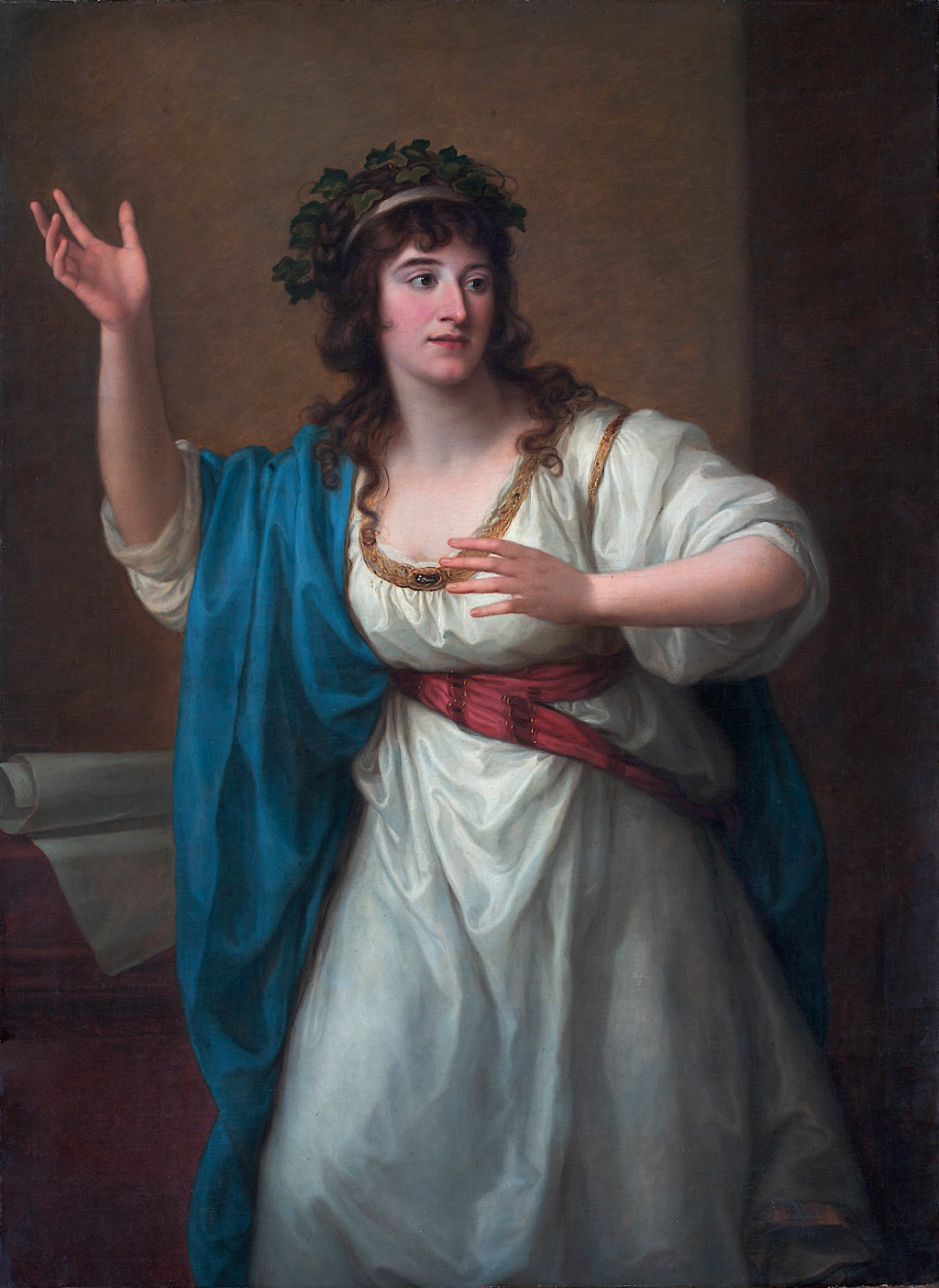
- Portrait of Teresa Bandettini-Landucci by Angelica Kauffman
- Born: 11 August 1763; Lucca, Grand Duchy of Tuscany
- Died: 6 April 1837 (aged 73); Lucca, Grand Duchy of Tuscany

Teresa Landucci Bandettini (also known by her Arcadian name Amarilli Etrusca; 11 August 1763 – 6 April 1837) was an Italian dancer, composer of extemporaneous verse, and poet, who is remembered as the Figurante Poetesca ("literary ballerina").

== Life ==
Born in 1763 to Benedetto Bandettini and Maria Alba Micheli in Tuscany in the city of Lucca, Bandettini came from a humble background. She was an orphan by the age of seven and was first heard of as a dancer using the name "Amarilli Etrusca".

After Bandettini married Lucchese Pietro Landucci, whom she had met in Imola in 1789, her career shifted from dancing to improvisation. Her specialty was to create and deliver verse on the spot from random suggestions supplied by an audience willing to pay to witness her emotional delivery and the creative process. Bandettini's talents led to her finding a patron in Count Ludovico Savioli. He paid for an early poem concerning the "Death of Adonis" to be not only printed but to be illustrated by Francesco Rosaspina. Bandettini was a composer of extemporaneous verse, and a poet. Not surprisingly with her dancing background, she was known as the literary ballerina (Figurante Poetesca). Although there were two publications of her improvised verses published in 1801 and 1807, Bandettini preferred to publish poetry that she had spent more time composing.

== Legacy ==
Within Bandettini's lifetime she was acknowledged as an important writer. The noted Italian poet Maria Maddalena Morelli, also known as Corilla Olimpica, dedicated some of the last of her poetry to Bandettini. There are a number of paintings of Bandettini including an oil by Angelica Kauffman. Kauffman was a member of the Italian literary Society known as the Arcadian Academy. Kauffman respected Bandettini skills, and created the portrait which she gave to her in 1794. In 2002 it was discovered that the young composer Niccolò Paganini had dedicated six long lost sonatas to her. She died in Lucca in 1837.

== Partial works ==
- Rime varie, Venezia, 1786
- Poesie diverse, Venezia, 1788
- Viareggio, poem, Venezia, 1788
- Morte di Adone, poem, Modena, 1790
- Omaggio Poetico in Morte del Duca Antonio Di Gennaro Belforte Licofrone Trezenio, sonnet, Napoli, 1790
- Applausi Poetici per Padre Anton M. Majulli D'Aloys, song, Napoli, 1790
- In Lode del Defunto Agatopisto Cromaziano, Abate Appiano Bonafede, sonnet, Roma, 1794
- Il Polidoro, tragedy, Lucca, 1794
- In Morte d' Una Sua Figlia, sonnet, Lucca, 1794
- La Gratitudine alla Patria di Amarilli Etrusca, sonnet, Lucca, 1795
- Al Canonico Agostino Peruzzi, letter, Venezia, 1795
- Per le Nozze Cesarei Leoni – Leti, rhyme, Roma, 1796
- Montranito, poem, Lucca, 1798
- Canti Estemporanei di Amarilli Etrusca, raccolta of verse, Lucca, 1799
- Saggio di Versi Estemporanei, raccolta of verse, Pisa, 1799
- Saggio di Versi, raccolta of verse, Pisa, 1799
- Rime estemporanee, Verona, 1801
- La Teseide, poem, Lucca, 1805
- Poesie Varie, raccolta, Parma, 1805
- Rime contemporanee, Lucca, 1807
- A Maria Beatrice Cybo D'Austria, ode, Modena, 1808
- In Morte Di Saverio Bettinelli, raccolta, Mantova, 1808
- La Partenza del Figlio, elegy, Ferrara, 1808
- Per le Nozze Grillenzoni-Pensa, anthology, Ferrara, 1808
- Polidoro, tragedy, Venezia, 1808
- Rime, raccolta, Venezia, 1809
- La Caduta de' Giganti, tragedy, Modena, 1814
- Paralipomeni d'Omero di Quinto Calabro Smisneo trasportati in versi italiani da Teresa Bandettini Landucci, Modena, 1815
- Al Marchese Valerio Ciccolini Silenzi di Macerata, letter, Roma, 1816
- Paralipomeni d'Omero di Quinto Calabro Smisneo trasportati in versi italiani da Teresa Bandettini Landucci, riedizione, Livorno, 1818
- Frammenti d'una e più Novelle Romantiche, prose, Lucca, 1820
- Per le nozze di Carlo Ludovico Di Borbone con Maria Teresa Di Savoia, ode, Lucca, 1820
- II Giudizio d'Amore per le nozze di Massimiliano Maria Giuseppe Di Sassonia Con Luisa Carlotta Di Borbone, ode, Lucca, 1825
- Per le Nozze Mezzanotte Piceller, hymn, Perugia, 1827
- Rosmunda in Ravenna, tragedy, Lucca, 1827
- In Morte di Vincenzo Monti, verse, Lucca, 1830
- In Morte del Marchese Orazio Cappelli, verse, Lucca, 1831
- Applausi Poetici per Padre Francesco Finetti, sonnet, Lucca, 1832
- Versi, raccolta, Lucca, 1833
- Poesie Estemporanee di Amarilli Etrusca, Lucca, 1835
- In Morte di Cesare Lucchesini, song, Lucca, 1836
- In Morte di Lazzaro Papi, song, 1836
- In morte della Principessa Rospigliosi, song, 1836
- In Morte di Fulvia Oli Vari Fulcini, sonnet, 1837
