= Santa Chiara, Correggio =

Church in Correggio, Italy

Santa Chiara is a Baroque-style Roman Catholic church and convent located on Piazzetta delle Suore in the town of Correggio, province of Reggio Emilia, region of Emilia-Romagna, Italy. The Clarissan convent adjacent to the church is still active.

== History ==
The church was erected in 1666 by the Confraternita della Santissima Trinità, along with the adjacent Capuchin Convent of Poor Clares. The church was refurbished in 1764 with rich baroque decorations, and restored in the 20th century after the 1996 earthquake. The façade is convex but simple. The interior has an oval layout, ringed with composite ionic-Corinthian columns, with a second story niches with statues of Saints Augustine, Jerome, Gregory, and Ambrose. The layout recalls churches of Francesco Borromini. Behind the apse is an iron grate that separates the area reserved for the nuns.
