= Il Fischietto =

Satirical magazine in Italy (1848–1916)

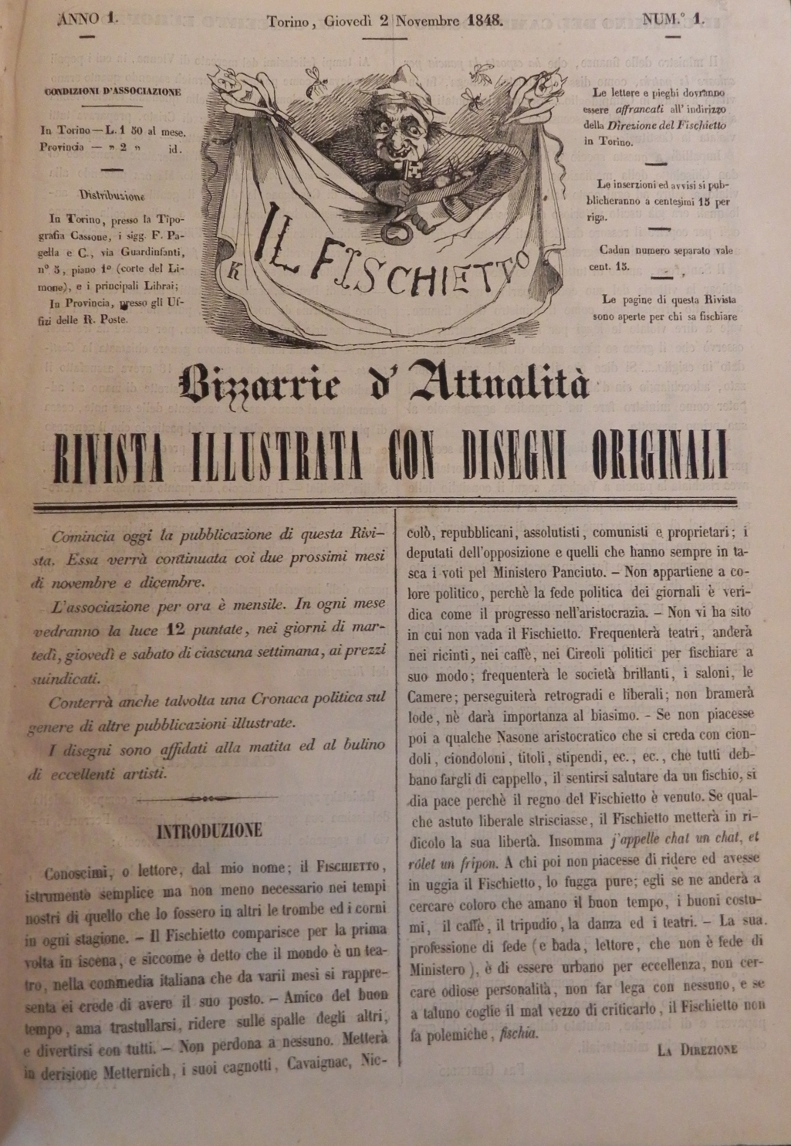
- Categories: Satirical magazine
- Founder: Giuseppe Cassone; Lorenzo Pedrone
- Founded: 1848
- First issue: 2 November 1848
- Final issue: 1916
- Country: Kingdom of Italy
- Based in: Turin
- Language: Italian

Il Fischietto (Italian: The Whistle) was a political satire magazine published in Turin between 1848 and 1916. It was among the most important Italian satirical magazines of its time. Its subtitle was Bizzarrie d'attuale - Rivista illustrata con disegni originali.

== History and profile ==
Il Fischietto was established by Giuseppe Cassone and Lorenzo Pedrone in Turin in 1848. Its first issue appeared on 2 November that year. Picchetti Pietro served as its director, and Francesco Redenti was one of its editors. The magazine came out three times per week until 1905 when its frequency was switched to biweekly. It was redesigned as a weekly in 1914.

The magazine covered political satire and supported civil liberties, freedom of speech and freedom of the press. Casimiro Teja was among the notable contributors of Il Fischietto. It targeted different groups, including government ministers, and had a liberal and anti-clerical political stance. It generally supported the politicians Giuseppe Garibaldi, Bettino Ricasoli and Cavour.

Its circulation was about 3,000 copies in the 1850s, but the magazine enjoyed higher levels of readership in the 1860s.

Il Fischietto folded in 1916.
