= Francesco Redenti =

Italian painter (1820–1876)

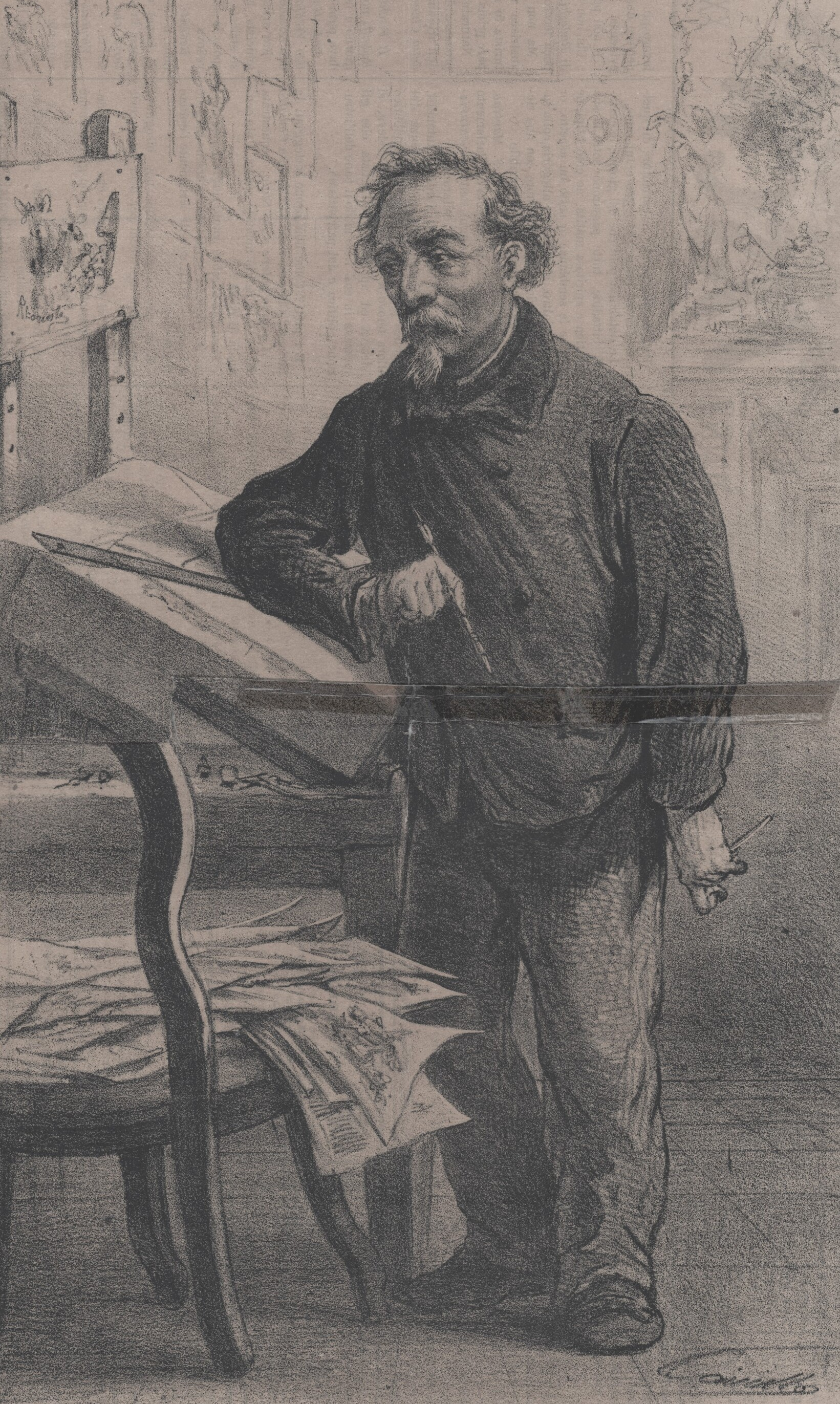
- Portrait of Francesco Redenti by Camillo Marietti published on Il Fischietto on 29 February 1876
- Born: Cesare Vienna; 1820; Correggio, Emilia-Romagna, Duchy of Modena
- Died: 27 February 1876 (aged 55–56); Turin, Kingdom of Italy
- Occupations: Caricaturist, printmaker

Signature
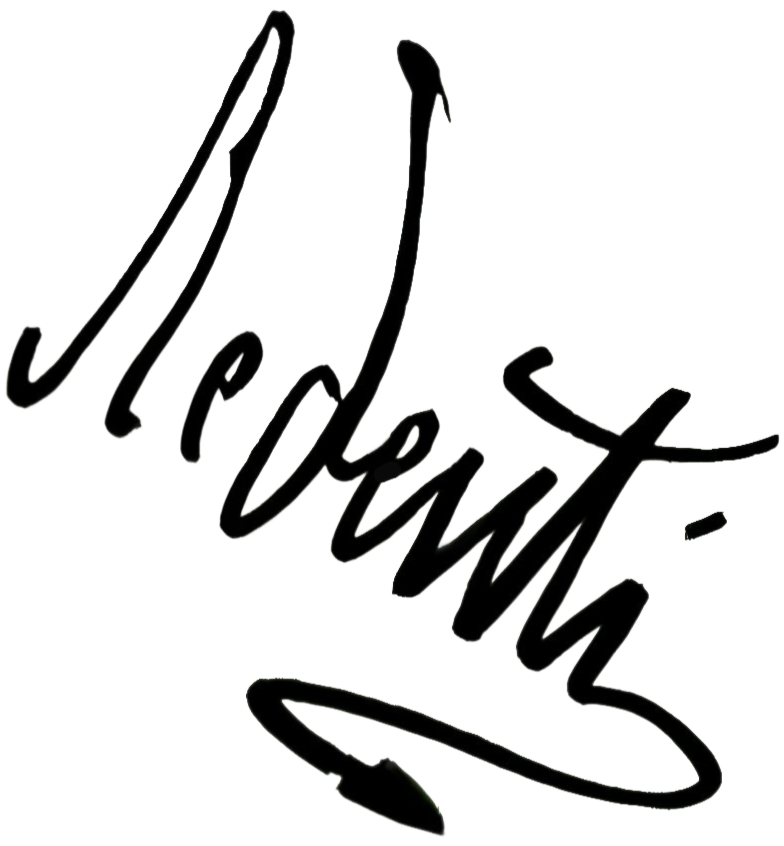

Francesco Redenti (1820 – 27 February 1876) was an Italian painter, engraver and cartoonist best known for his political caricatures in the satirical magazine Il Fischietto.

== Biography ==
Born Cesare Vienna in 1820 in Correggio, to Jewish parents, he adopted the name Francesco Saverio Luigi Redenti upon converting to Catholicism. A passionate Italian nationalist, he was involved in the Risorgimento movement. He became known as the "caricaturist of the barricades" for posting his first satirical plates on the walls of Milan during the Five Days of Milan in 1848. Following the Salasco armistice, he fled to Turin, where he worked on the satirical magazine Il Fischietto.

Founded by the caricaturist Lorenzo Pedrone, Il Fischietto employed some of the most talented Italian cartoonists, including Camillo Marietti, Virginio Ippolito and Casimiro Teja. Redenti soon became renowned for his anti-Austrian drawings and caricatures of Camillo Benso, Count of Cavour. An advocate of Italian unification, Redenti held strong anti-clerical views. He was sympathetic towards the Historical Right and critical of Mazzini and republicanism. After the fall of the Right, he attacked Depretis and Crispi and opposed Trasformismo.

Redenti became the magazine's director in 1855. Under his leadership, circulation reached 3,000 copies. He created a French edition, initially titled Le Père Siffleur and later renamed Le Sifflet. He also collaborated with the Milanese magazine Il Pungolo, as well as Il Buonumore, which was published in Turin from 1864 to 1865. Redenti was also a painter, and some of his works are displayed at the Correggio Museum in his hometown. He died in Turin in 1876.

== Bibliography ==
- Bryan, Michael (1889). Walter Armstrong; Robert Edmund Graves (eds.). Dictionary of Painters and Engravers, Biographical and Critical. Vol. II L-Z. London: George Bell and Sons. p. 352.
