= San Francesco, Correggio =

Catholic church in Correggio, Italy

Coordinates: 44.770894°N 10.777422°E

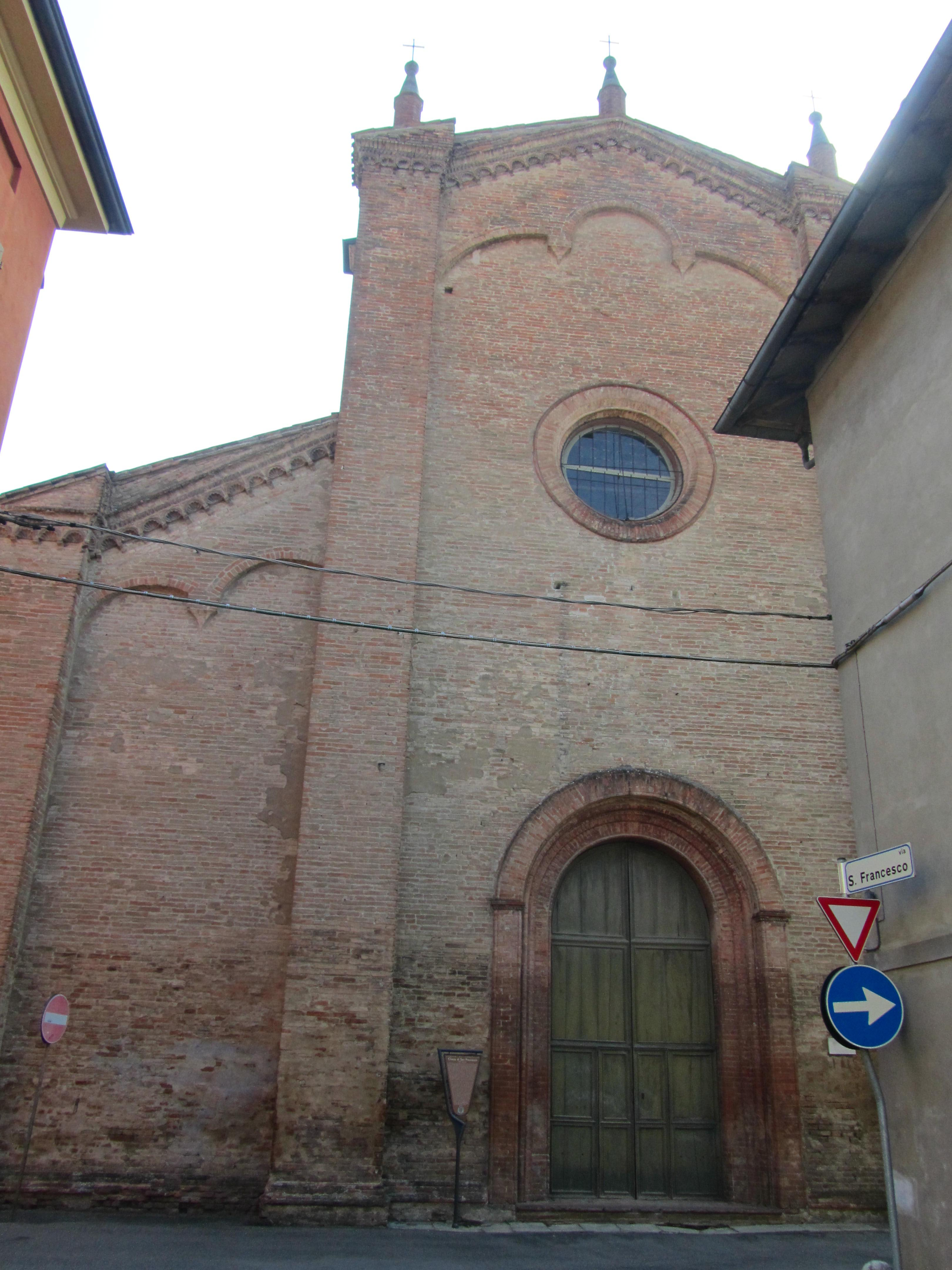
Correggio3

San Francesco is a Roman Catholic church located on Via Roma in the town center of Correggio, province of Reggio Emilia, region of Emilia-Romagna, Italy.

== History ==
A Franciscan convent was putatively established in town in 1322, although documentation is scarce. Archeologic studies suggest this convent has structures dating at least to the late 14th century. Documents do verify work in 1443 on the complex. The church was apparently rebuilt in 1463-1490 under the patronage of Manfredo II of Correggio and his wife Agnese Pio. Over the next century the convent gained a second cloister and more dormitories. Further construction continued over the following centuries, including designs for a refurbishment of the monastery in 1766 by the architect Francesco Cipriano Forti. In 1846, his grandson Francesco Forti, continued work on the convent. In 1926, the church underwent restoration. The earthquake of October 15, 1996 damaged the structure of the church and its bell tower. Extensive restorations have been pursued since. Little movable artwork remains.

The interior structure has a central nave separated from lateral aisles by brick columns and pilasters. The vaults are ribbed in Gothic-style.

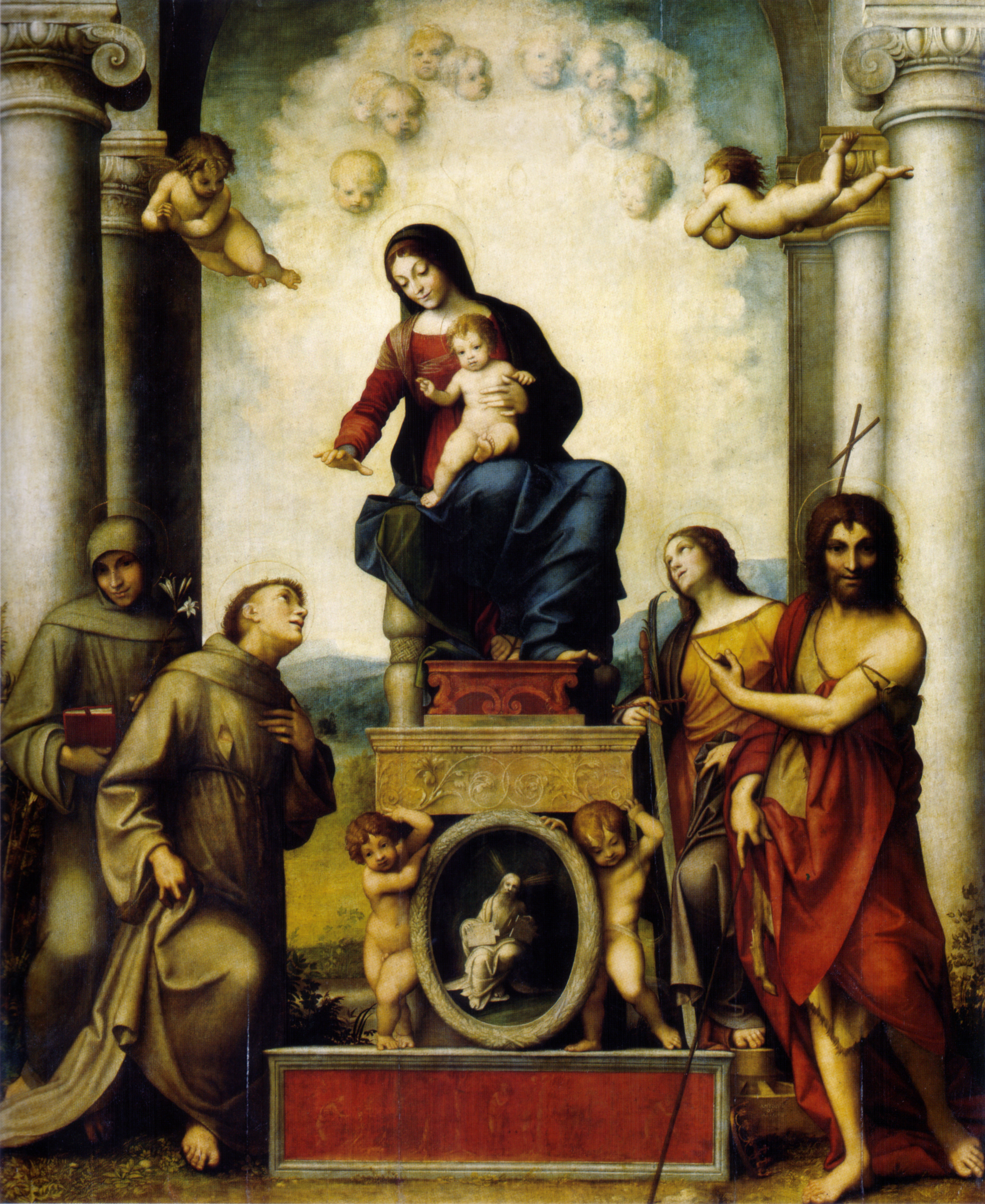
Madonna with St Francis now in Dresden

This church once housed two important works by Antonio Allegri: the Madonna and Child with St Francis (1514-1515), now in Dresden, was the main altarpiece, and the Rest on the Flight to Egypt with St Francis (1520) is now at the Uffizi in Florence. Allegri was buried in this church in 1534, in tombs with his family. The painting of the Madonna was removed by the Duke Francesco I d'Este in 1636.
