= Francesco Rosaspina =

Italian engraver and painter (1762–1841)

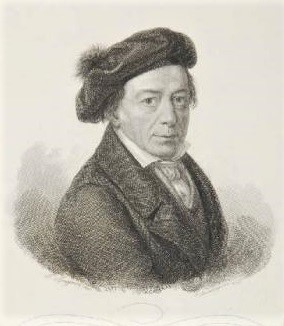
- Born: 2 January 1762; Montescudo, Italy
- Died: 2 September 1841 (aged 79); Bologna, Italy
- Occupations: engraver; painter

Francesco Rosaspina (2 January 1762 – 2 September 1841) was an Italian engraver and painter.

== Biography ==
Rosaspina was born in Montescudo, near Rimini. His father, Giovanni Battista, was a notary and a magistrate by profession. As an infant, his parents moved to Bologna. His initial training in engraving was with Giovanni Fabbri. He emulated the style of Francesco Bartolozzi, with dense crosshatching. He gained many commissions to engrave copies of local works of art. This led to a work titled The Gallery of Bologna, with engravings by him, his brother and his pupils, of over a hundred of the paintings at the Pinacoteca.

He was named a docent at the Accademia Clementina and became a friend of Andrea Appiani, Giovanni Battista Bodoni, and Giuseppe Zauli. His pupils include Pietro Tomba, Antonio Marchi, and Gaetano Guadagnini. The latter replaced him as professor at the Bolognese Academy. His daughter, Enrichetta Rosaspina, married his pupil Giuseppe Asioli; their son, Luigi Asioli, became a prominent painter.

== Gallery ==
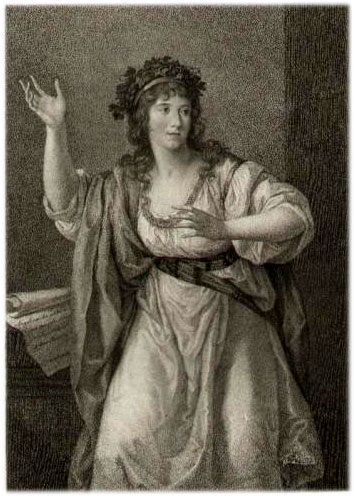
Portrait of Teresa Bandettini (after Kauffman)

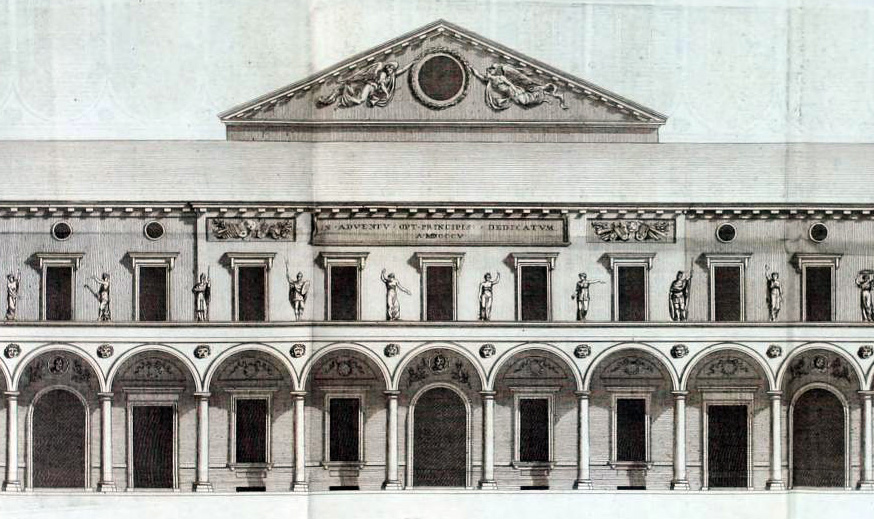
Teatro del Corso, Bologna (detail)

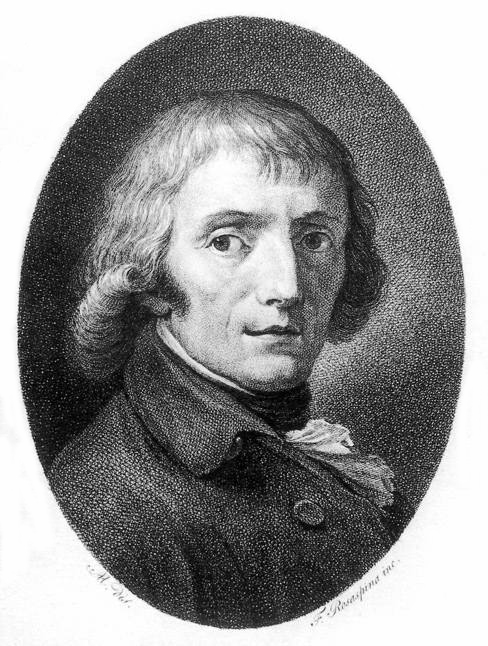
Portrait of Giuseppe Parini (after Appiani)
