= Santa Maria della Misericordia, Correggio =

Church in Correggio, Italy

Santa Maria della Misericordia is a Roman Catholic church located on Via Santa Maria near Piazza Garibaldi in the historic center of the town of Correggio, province of Reggio Emilia, region of Emilia-Romagna, Italy. The church is presently deconsecrated and closed.

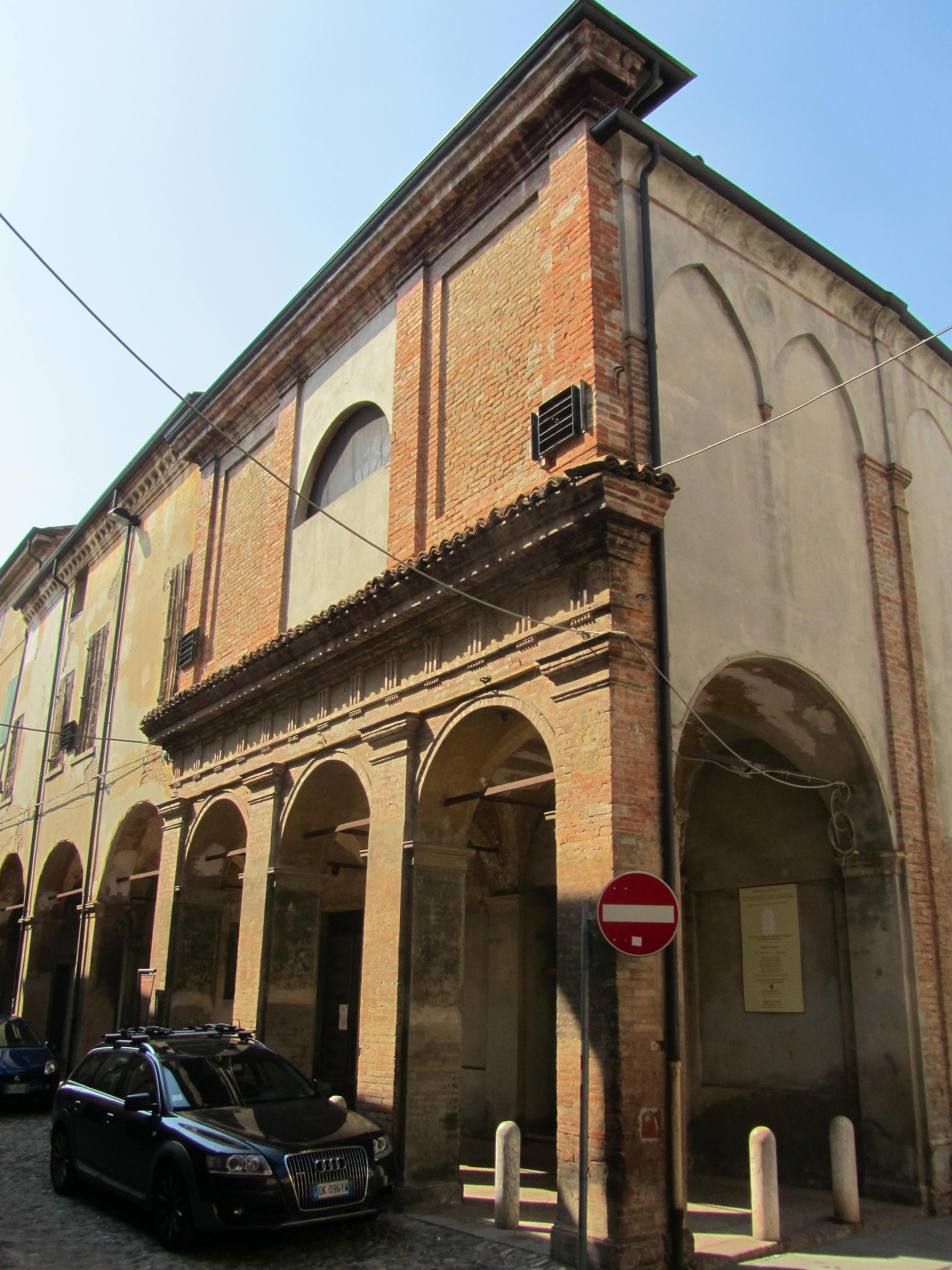
Santa Maria della Misericordia portico

== History ==
A church at the site is documented since 1316, affiliated with the Confraternity dei Verberati di Santa Maria della Misericordia. The present church however is due to reconstruction in the 18th century. The confraternity was suppressed in 1782, and for some years, the church was converted into storage site and store for firewood. The church was never reopened for worship after the suppression.

The façade on via Santa Maria has a brick portico with four heavy doric pilasters and rounded arches. the main wooden door dates to the 18th century. Along the right flank of the church, are Gothic-style mullioned windows with ogival peaks. The stubby bell tower was erected in 1833.

The interior once held the altarpieces of the Triptych of the Humanity of Christ (1525)and Four Saints (1516-1517) by Antonio Allegri. The confraternity sold the first canvas in 1613 to Siro d’Austria, Lord of Correggio. The central panel is now in the Galleria Vaticana of Rome. The St Bartholemew is only preserved via a copy; while the third panel with St John the Baptist is in a private English collection.

The Four Saints altarpiece remained in the church until 1776. By the early 19th-century it came into hands of the Baron Ashburton in London, who sold the painting to the Metropolitan Museum of Art of New York.
