= Santa Maria della Misericordia, Falconara Marittima =

Church in Falconara Marittima, Italy

Coordinates: 43.60483°N 13.37007°E

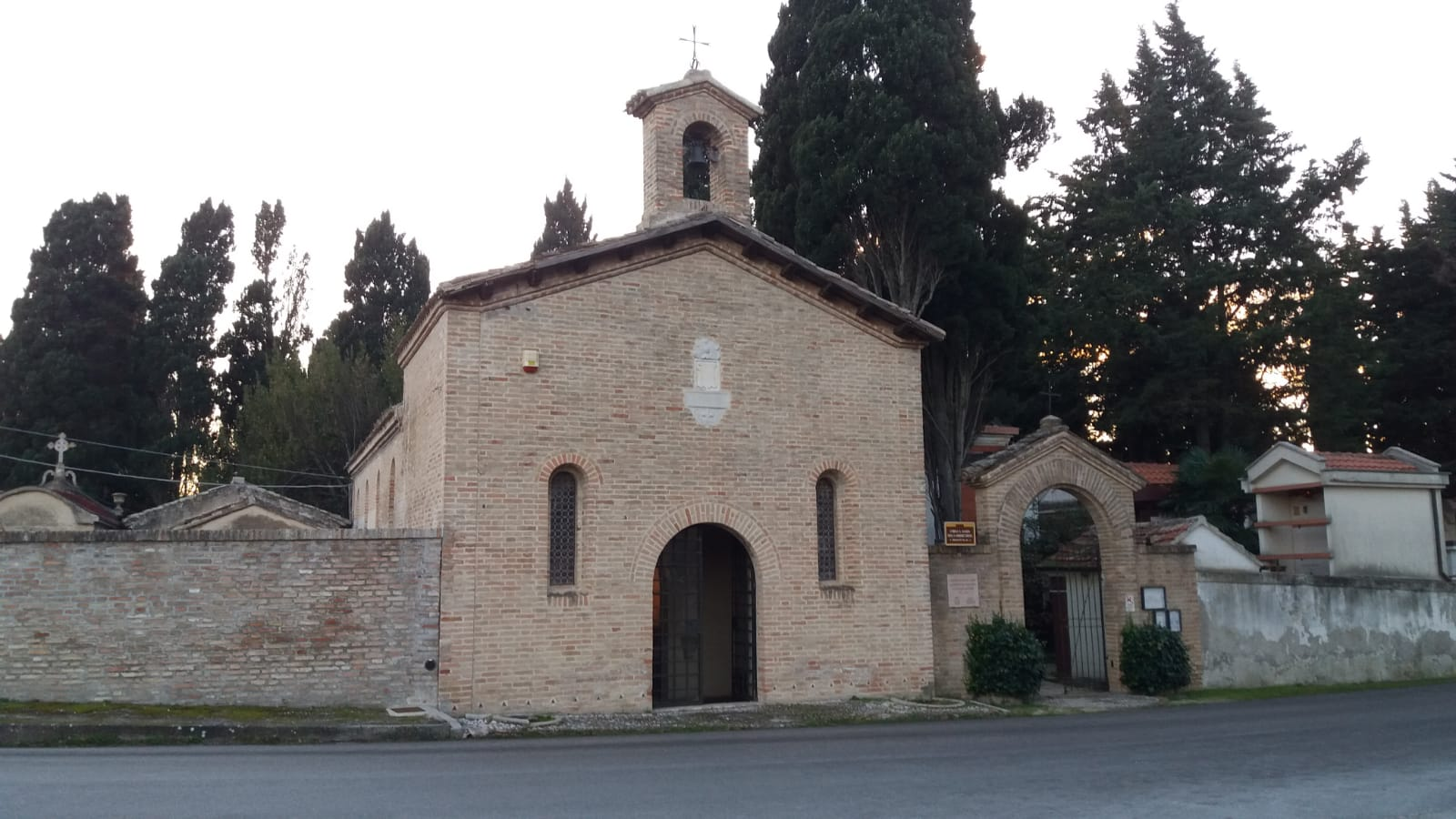
Santa Maria della Misericordia

Santa Maria della Misericordia is a former church located on Via Santa Maria near the cemetery of Castelferretti, in Falconara Marittima, province of Ancona, region of Marche, Italy.

The present church building is now deconsecrated. Located atop a more ancient structure, it was built during the 1400s, as an ex-voto of gratitude for the waning of the plague. Further refurbishments were performed in 1610. In 1938–1940, during another refurbishment, Quattrocento frescoes discovered by Dante de Carolis and Mario Pesarini. These were initially removed for restoration and replaced in the church in 1969.

The frescoes, in a primitive provincial style, are by unknown artists, and depict the Madonna della Misericordia supported by Angels and defending with her mantle the faithful. At the sides are Saints Lawrence and Bernardino of Siena. Above is the Holy Trinity. Other saints are depicted on side walls.
