= Correggio, Emilia-Romagna =

Correggio
- Comune
- Città di Correggio
- Flag Coat of arms

- Location within Italy Location within Emilia-Romagna
- Coordinates: 44°46′13″N 10°46′56″E
- Country: Italy
- Region: Emilia-Romagna
- Province: Reggio Emilia (RE)
- Frazioni: Budrio, Canolo, Fazzano, Fosdondo, Lemizzone, Mandrio, Mandriolo, Prato, San Biagio, San Martino Piccolo, San Prospero.

Area
  - Total: 77 km^{2} (30 sq mi)
- Elevation: 33 m (108 ft)

Population (31 March 2026)
  - Total: 25,223
  - Density: 330/km^{2} (850/sq mi)
- Demonym: Correggesi
- Time zone: UTC+1 (CET)
  - Summer (DST): UTC+2 (CEST)
- Postal code: 42015
- Dialing code: 0522
- Patron saint: St. Quirinus
- Saint day: June 4
- Website: Official website

Correggio (Reggiano: Curèṡ) is a town and comune in the Province of Reggio Emilia, in the Emilia-Romagna region of Italy, in the Po valley. As of 31 March 2026 Correggio had an estimated population of 25,223.

Its patron saint is Quirinus of Sescia, to whom the Basilica of San Quirino is dedicated.

It was the seat of Veronica Gambara (1485–1550), a noted politician poet who ruled the principality after the death of her husband Giberto X, Count of Correggio, from 1518 to 1550.

It is the birthplace of the Renaissance painter Antonio Allegri, who was called "il Correggio" from the name of his town. The French poet Tugdual Menon resided in Correggio for much of his life.

It is also the birthplace of composer Bonifazio Asioli, Venetian School composer Claudio Merulo, rock singer Luciano Ligabue, educator Loris Malaguzzi, who developed the Reggio Emilia approach, 1908 Summer Olympics marathon runner Dorando Pietri, and novelist Pier Vittorio Tondelli.

== Title ==
In 1659, the Principality was annexed to the Duchy of Modena.
As a titular Duke of Modena, the current holder of the title of "Prince of Correggio" would be Prince Lorenz of Belgium, Archduke of Austria-Este.

== Main sights ==
=== Religious buildings ===
- Basilica of San Quirino, built from 1512 to 1587.
- San Francesco, until 1638 housed the painting Rest on the Flight to Egypt with Saint Francis.
- San Giuseppe Calasanzio
- Santa Chiara (1666)
- Santuario della Madonna della Rosa
- Santa Maria della Misericordia
- San Sebastiano (1591)

=== Secular buildings ===
- Rocchetta
- Torrione
- Palazzo dei Principi (Museo Civico il Correggio)
- Teatro Comunale Bonifazio Asioli
- Palazzo Comunale
- Palazzo della Ragione e Torre dell'Orologio
- Jewish Cemetery

== Gallery ==
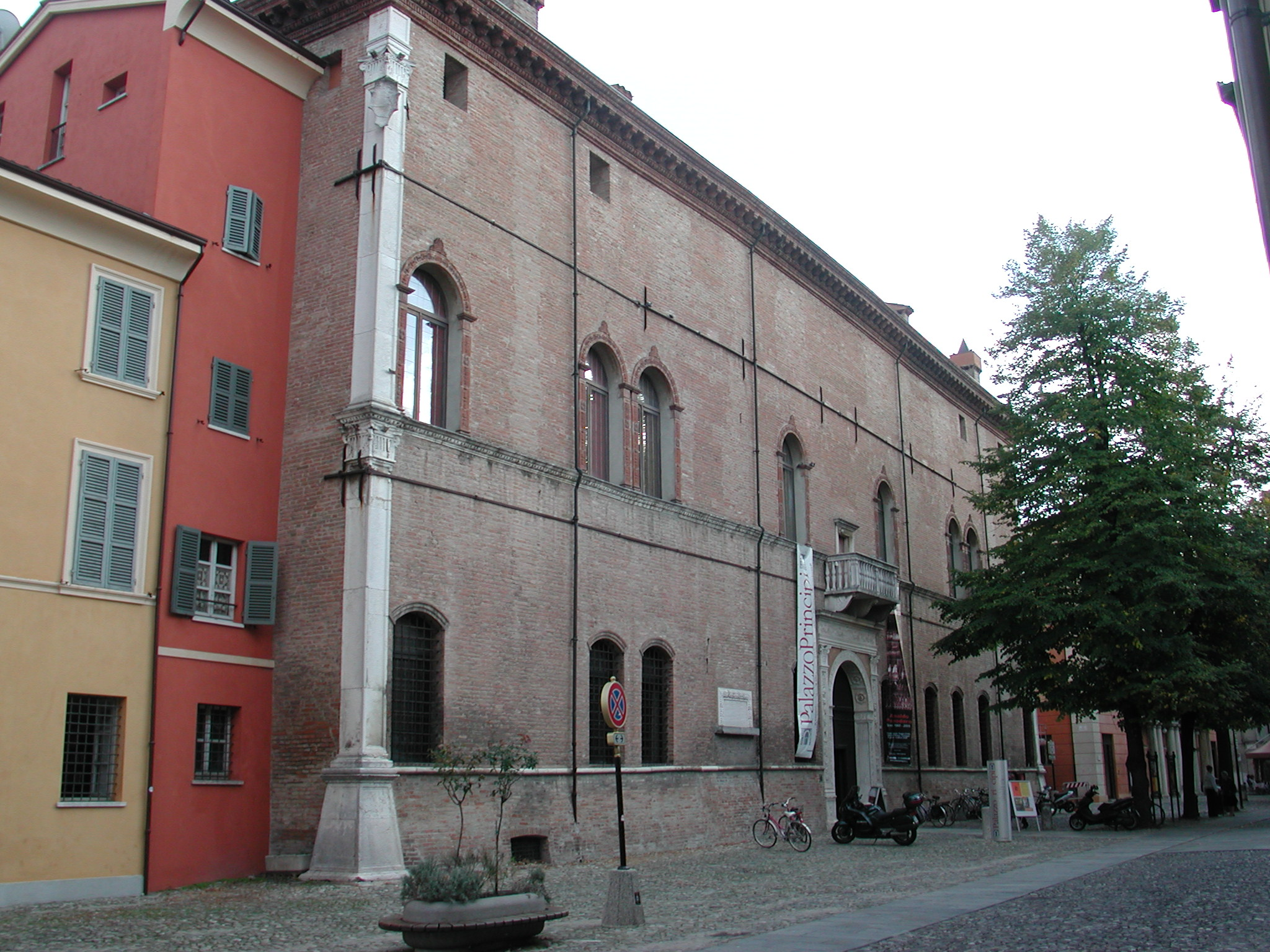
Palazzo dei Principi

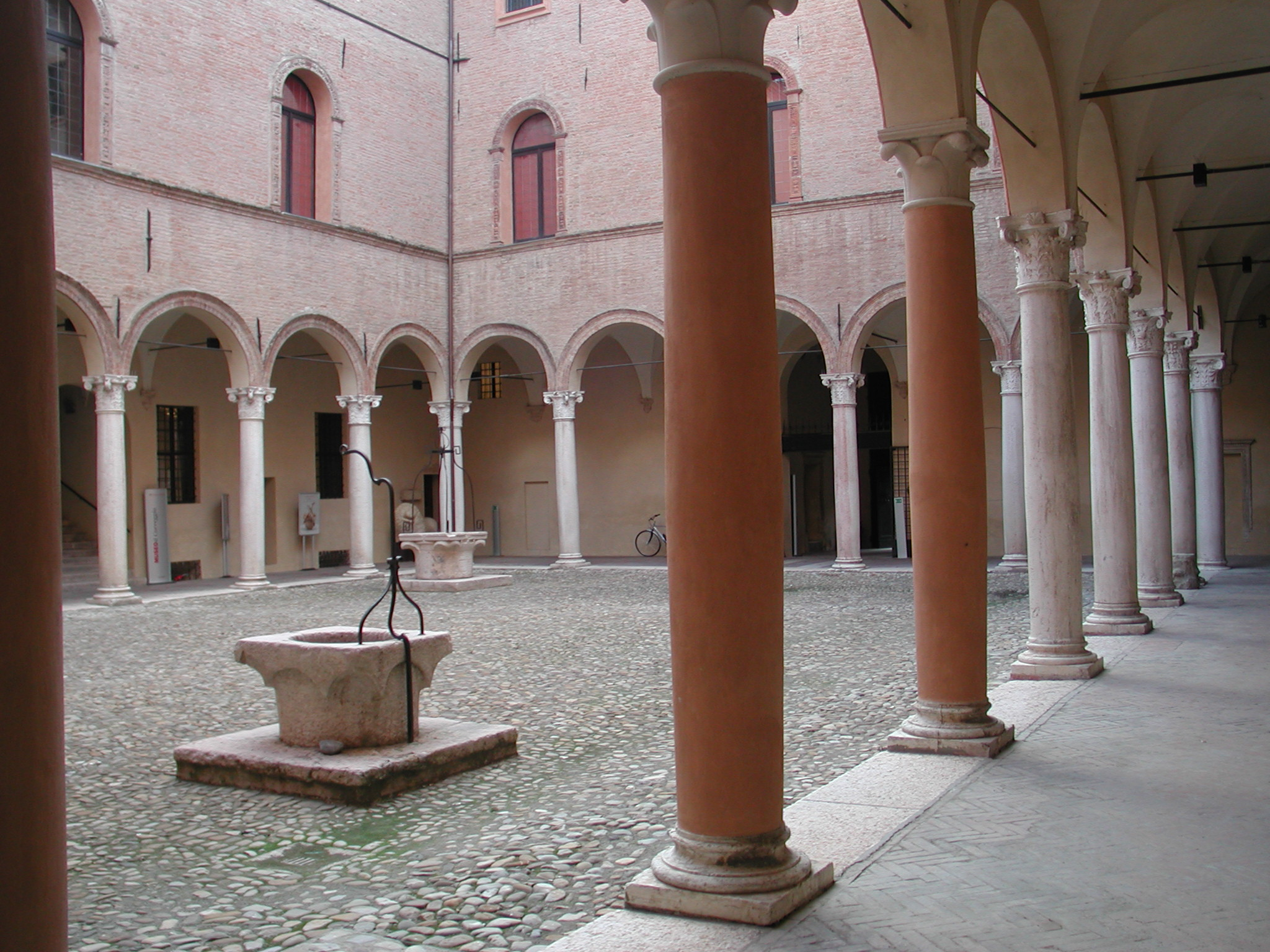
Internal courtyards of Palazzo dei Principi

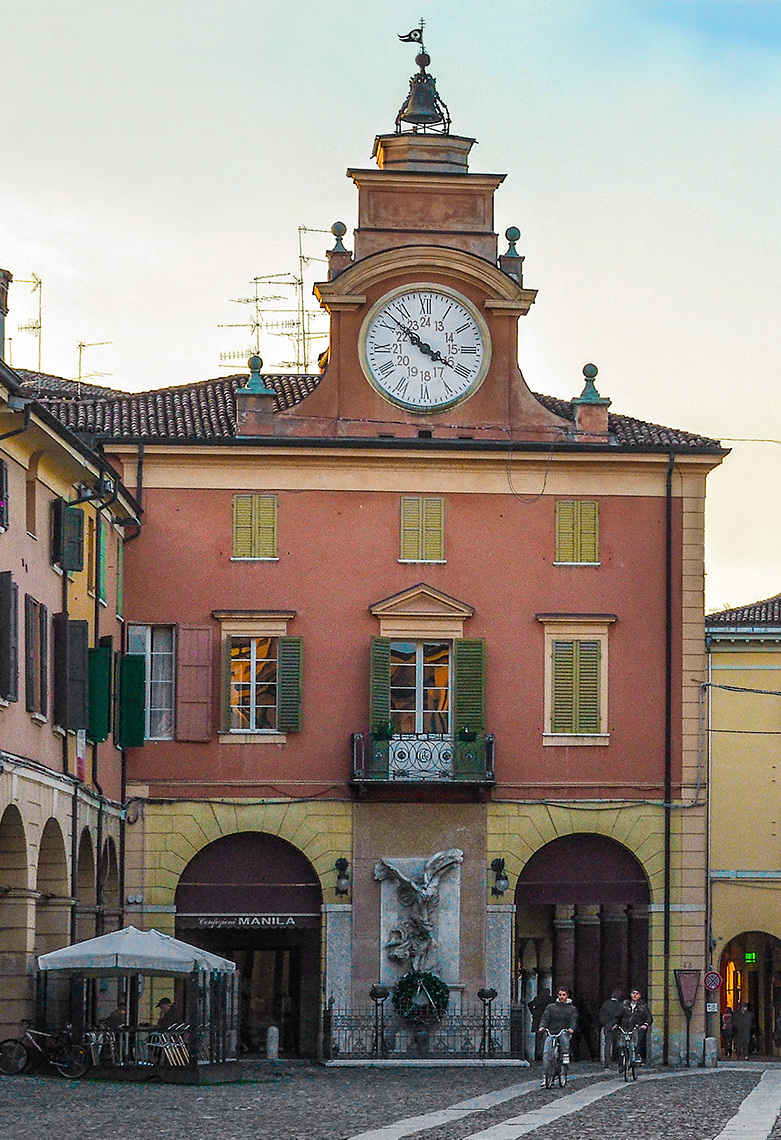
Palazzo della Ragione e Torre dell'Orologio

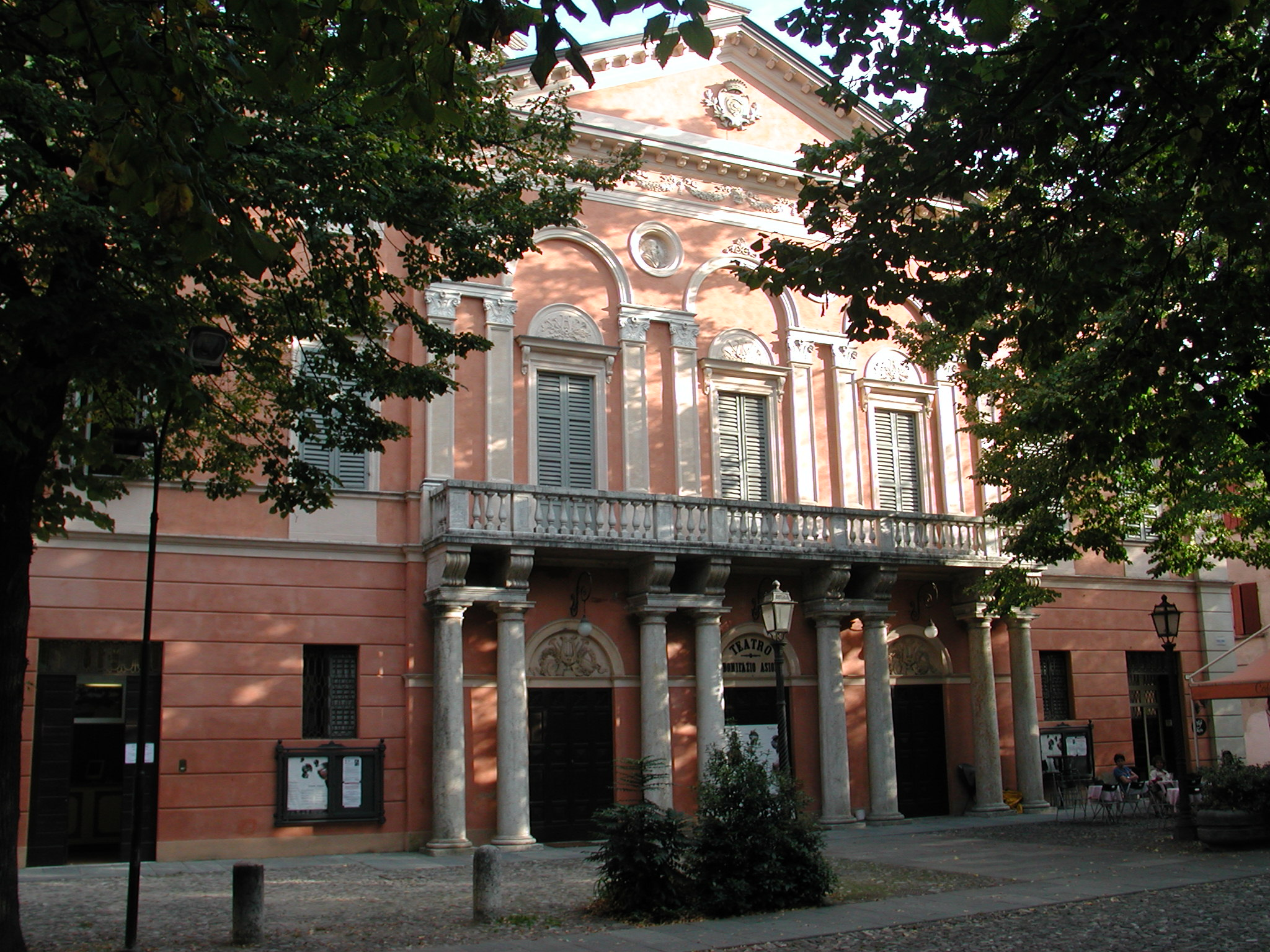
Teatro Asioli

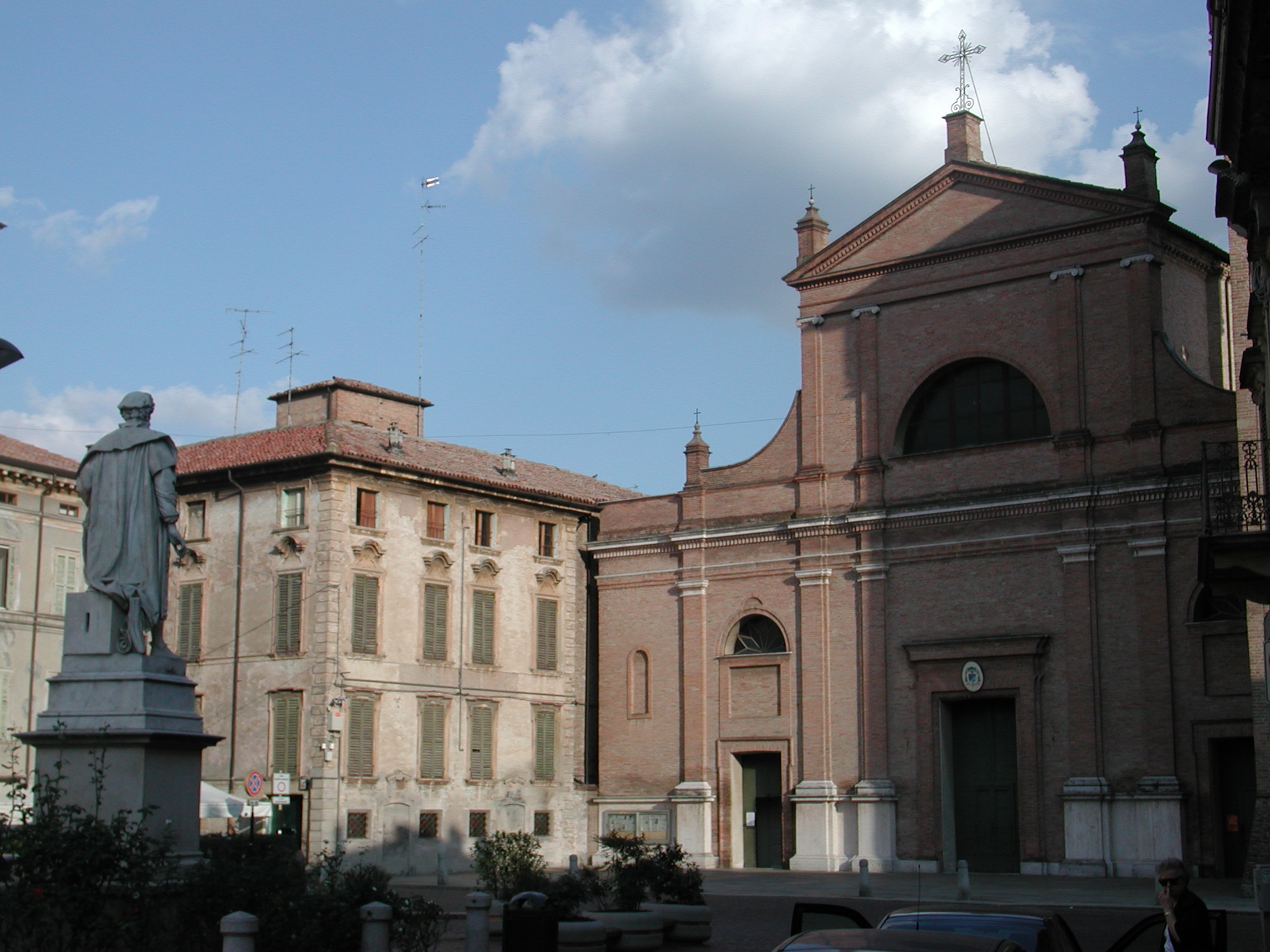
Church of St. Quirinus (Chiesa di san Quirino)

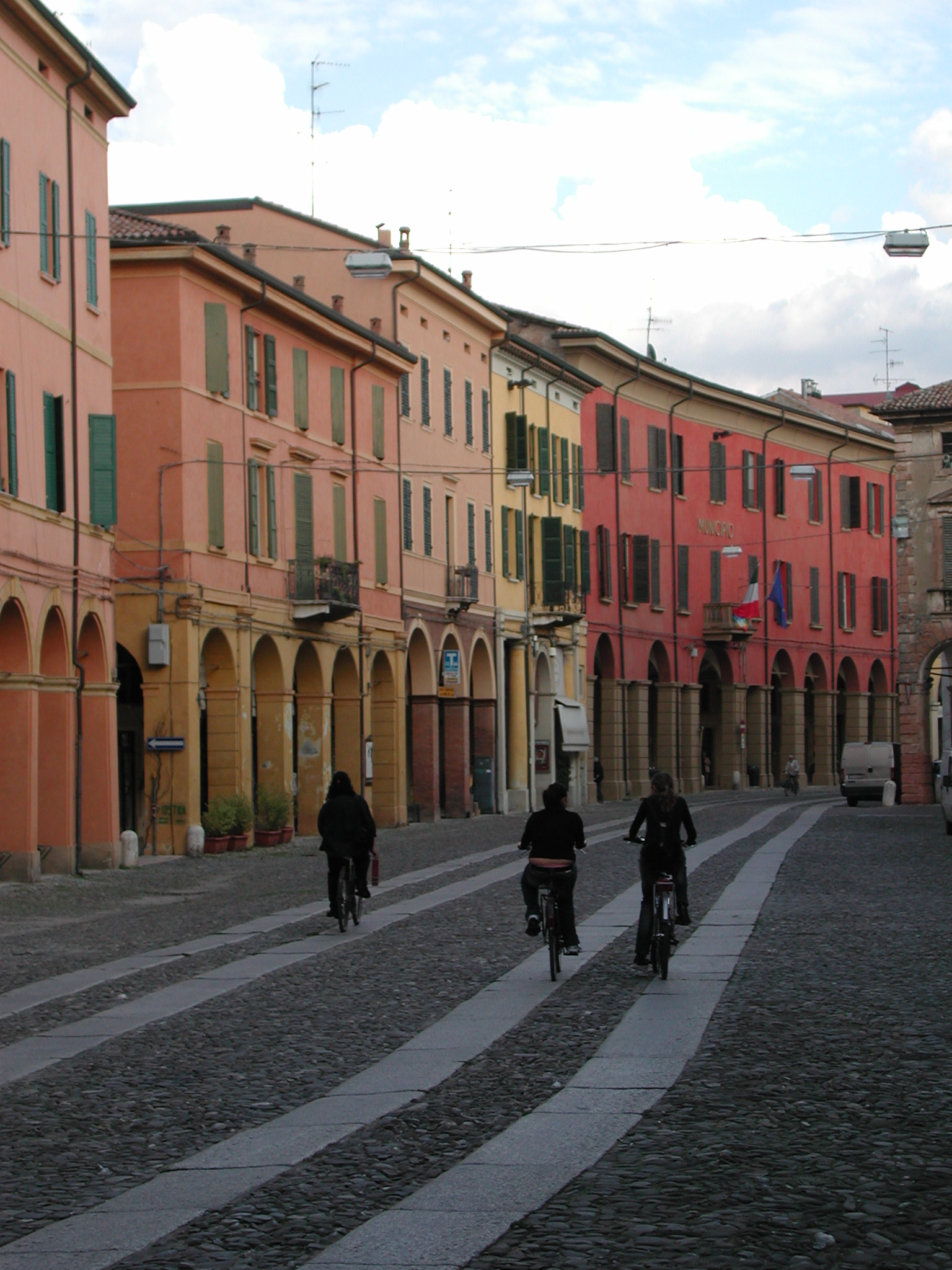
Correggio corso

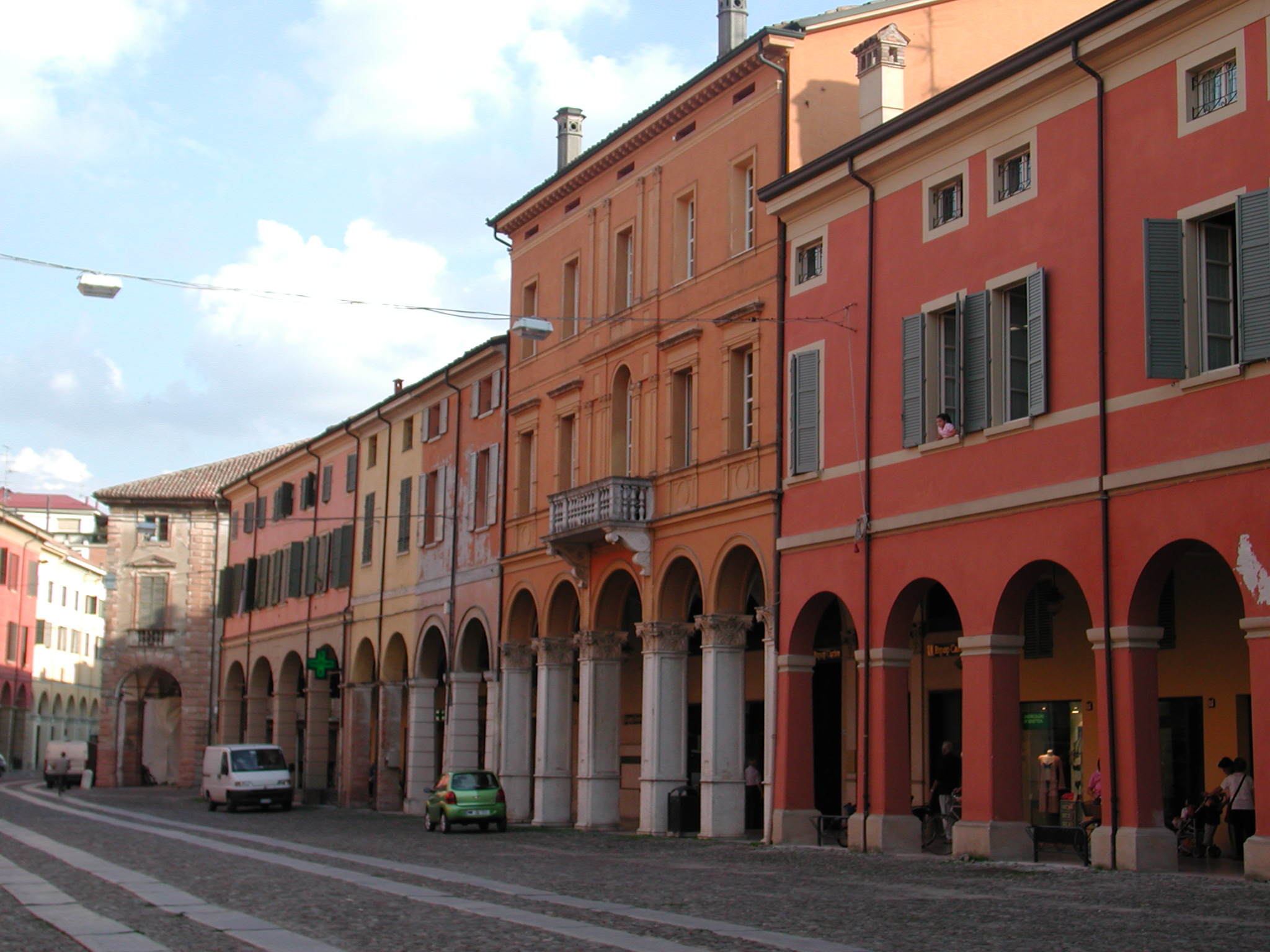
Correggio palazzi

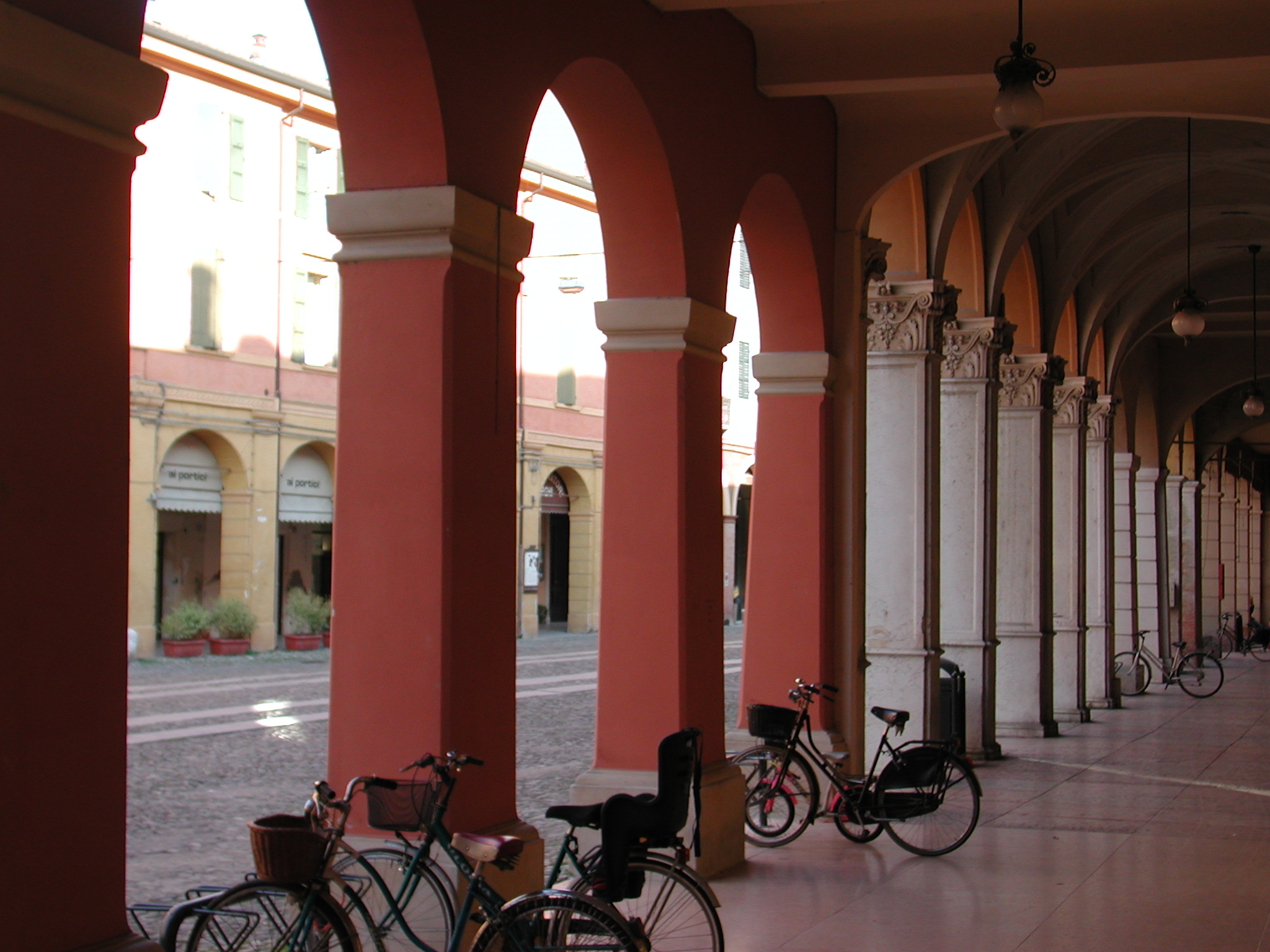
Portici – arcade

== See also ==
- Castles of the Duchy
