= Egisto Bellini =

Italian architect (1877–1955)

- Born: 23 September 1877; Siena, Kingdom of Italy
- Died: 12 October 1955 (aged 78); San Rocco a Pilli, Province of Siena, Italy
- Occupations: Architect, architectural restorer

Egisto Bellini (23 September 1877 – 12 October 1955) was an Italian architect and architectural restorer who was responsible for numerous restoration projects involving churches, abbeys, and historic buildings throughout southern Tuscany. Among his most notable works were restorations at the Abbey of San Salvatore at Monte Amiata, the castle of Castellina in Chianti, the Abbey of Monte Oliveto Maggiore, and the reconstruction of the Basilica dell'Osservanza after its destruction during World War II.

== Life and career ==
Bellini was born in Siena on 23 September 1877 into a family of master builders. He studied ornamental design at the Institute of Fine Arts in Siena and later specialized in architecture at the Institute of Art in Rome, where he graduated in 1902.

Between 1902 and 1908, Bellini worked on architectural projects for private firms in Rome, Milan, and Genoa. In 1909 he won a competition as a draughtsman for the Superintendency in Cagliari and entered service on 24 May 1910. In July of the same year he was transferred to the Superintendency office in Siena, where he remained for about forty years.

During his long career he directed or designed restoration works on numerous churches, abbeys, and historic buildings in the provinces of Siena and Grosseto. In January 1933, Bellini was appointed assistant architect to the Superintendency for Monuments of Siena. Between 1941 and 1942 he briefly served as acting head of the Superintendency.

After World War II, he continued to oversee restoration works across the region. In 1950, he retired from public service and was appointed honorary architect of the Opera del Duomo of Siena. He died in 1955.

== Selected works ==
- Restoration of the Pieve di San Lorenzo a Merse (1911)
- Restoration of the church of Santa Regina, Siena (1912)
- Restoration of the Palazzo Malfatti, Massa Marittima (1912)
- Restoration of the castle of Castellina in Chianti (project 1913; carried out 1927–1930)
- Restoration of the Palazzo Comunale of Montalcino (1910–1919)
- Restoration of the church of Santa Maria Assunta, Piancastagnaio (1922–1923)
- Restoration of the Abbey of San Salvatore, Abbadia San Salvatore (1923–1931)
- Restoration of several gates of the city walls of Siena (1927–1937)
- Restoration of the church of San Clemente, Montelaterone (1932–1934)
- Restoration of the Palazzo Comunale of Piombino (1933–1935)
- Restoration of the church of San Bartolomeo, Seggiano (1933–1938)
- Restoration of the Pieve of Santa Maria a Lamula, Montelaterone (1935–1943)
- Restoration of the Abbey of Monte Oliveto Maggiore (1938)
- Project for the new church of San Miniato, Fonterutoli (1942–1952)
- Reconstruction of the Basilica of San Bernardino all'Osservanza, Siena (1945–1950)
- Restoration of the church of Santa Maria in Prato, Radda in Chianti (1947–1949)
- Restoration of the church of San Leonardo, Arcidosso (1950)

== Sources ==
- Prezzolini, Carlo (1985). Le chiese di Arcidosso e la pieve di Lamula (in Italian). Siena: Edizioni Periccioli.
- Santi, Bruno (1995). Guida storico-artistica alla Maremma. Itinerari culturali nella provincia di Grosseto (in Italian). Siena: Nuova Immagine.
- Bianchini, Dominga (2006). "Egisto Bellini e il restauro delle porte di Siena". Bullettino senese di storia patria (in Italian). CXIII: 293–330.
- Colucci, Silvia (2007). "Vagheggiando un medioevo ininterrotto. L'architetto Egisto Bellini (1877–1955) e i ripristini neomedievali in Chianti". Il Chianti. Storia arte cultura territorio (in Italian) (25): 155–220.
- Rotundo, Felicia; Pagliaro, Rosario, eds. (2008). Egisto Bellini (1877–1955). Disegni di architettura e di ornato (in Italian). Pisa: ETS. pp. 27–30.
- Bellini, A. (19 December 2008). "Egisto Bellini. Un grande architetto chiocciolino dei primi decenni del secolo scorso". Affogasanti. Il giornale di San Marco (in Italian). XXXVI: 11.
