= Francesco di Bartolommeo Alfei =

Italian painter

Francesco di Bartolommeo Alfei (Montalcino, 1421 - Siena, 1495) was an Italian painter of the Renaissance, active in Siena. Like other Sienese painters, and different from the contemporary Florentine style, Alfei maintained a gothic and mystical style of painting.

== Biography ==
Like many of lesser painters of the era, there is much confusion around his life and attributed works. There is in fact, no work known to be by his hand with documentary assurance. He was for many years only known as a name, but in the late 1940s, the art critic Roberto Longhi began to question the attribution of a large predella from the Basilica dell'Osservanza in Siena. Initially the predella had been attributed to Sassetta or Sano di Pietro (by Cesare Brandi). In 2010, documents were found to argue for Sano di Pietro as the Master of the Osservanza Triptych.

Of the documents relating to Alfei are that:

- In 1454, he is sued for failing to complete the painting of a chapel for Ser Lorenzo di Giusu.
- In 1456, he is at Castel-Mozo.
- In 1474, he was paid for painting a chataletto.
- In 1483, in Valdichiana, he was engaged in some designs.
- In 1488, in Siena, he is aged impoverished and afflicted with gout.

Additionally, in 1464, along with the painter, Sano di Pietro, he asks for payment for work done for the artist Antonio di Simone, to aid in completion of some paintings for Pietro Trecerchi.

Other sources say he had a studio in Siena in Compagnia di Rialto e Cartagine. He worked for Pope Pius II in 1460, for the diplomat Leonardo Benvoglienti, for the Ottieri della Ciaia family and for Sinolfo di Castellottieri. In 1455 the magistrates of Siena paid Alfei for work done at Monte Argentario near Orbetello; works till recently attributed to Ambrogio Lorenzetti and to Sassetta. In 1473 he may have worked in the region of Marche for the papal legate, Cardinal Bartolomeo Roverella.

Among works attributed to Alessi are:

- Birth of the Virgin (Museo Asciano)
- Crucifixion and St Ambrose (Civic Museum, Siena)
- Martyrdom of St Bartholemew (Civic Museum, Siena)
- Madonna and Chile (Civic Museum, Siena)
- Resurrection of Christ (Musée des Beaux-Arts de Dijon)
- St Anthony Abbot at Mass (Gemaldegalerie, Berlin)

Another person named or with the surname Bartolomeo Alfei (Macerata, 1460 - Ancona, 1557) was an Italian writer.
