= Nativity of the Virgin (Sano di Pietro) =

15th-century painting

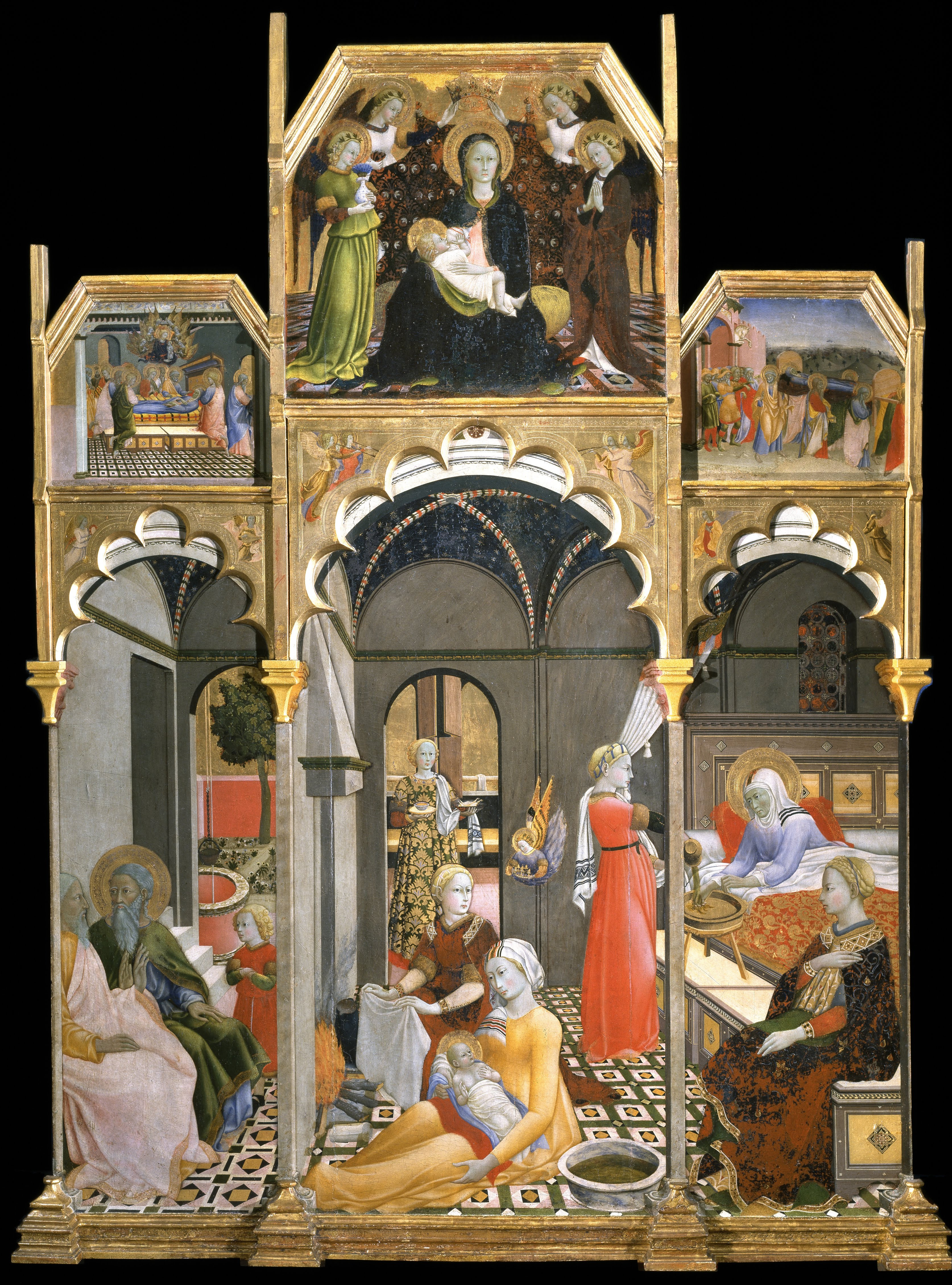

Nativity of the Virgin is a 1438–1439 tempera on panel painting, now in the Museum of Sacred Art in Ascanio, Province of Siena, Tuscany, Italy. It forms the central panel of a multi-panel altarpiece, the rest of which shows episodes from the life of the Virgin Mary. Once attributed to the Master of the Osservanza Triptych by Roberto Longhi and others, it is now usually attributed to Sano di Pietro.

== Bibliography ==
- (in French) Daniel Arasse (2008). L'Homme en perspective - Les primitifs d'Italie (in French). Paris: Hazan. ISBN 978-2-7541-0272-8..
- (in French) Giulietta Chelazzi Dini, Alessandro Angelini, Bernardina Sani and Maïa Rosenberger, Les Peintres de Sienne, Imprimerie nationale, 1997 ISBN 2-7433-0237-2, p. 229
- (in Italian) Stefano Zuffi, Grande atlante del Rinascimento, Electa, Milan 2007. ISBN 978-88-370-4898-3.
