= Bianciardi =

Italian family name

Bianciardi (Italian pronunciation: [bjanˈtʃardi]) is an Italian family name.
During the Middle Ages and Renaissance period, Bianciardi was in particular an important Florentine noble family that maintained strong ties with the Catholic Church.
Several people have left traces of their lives to date, particularly bankers, knights, landlords and scholars who have had relationships with other well-known personalities, including members of the Visconti, Villani, Aldighieri and Medici families.
In Old Italian, in the late 17th and early 20th centuries, it assumed the synonym of 'whitish' as gallicism of the French word Blanchard, as confirmed by the linguist Carlo Salvioni.
An example of a literary text where it is used as a word is in D'Annunzio's work Le faville del maglio.

== Geographical distribution ==
In Tuscany, the frequency of the surname is one of the highest than regional average (1:3720) in the following provinces:

- Province of Siena (1:484)
- Province of Grosseto (1:686)

== Historical origins ==
=== House of Bianciardi ===
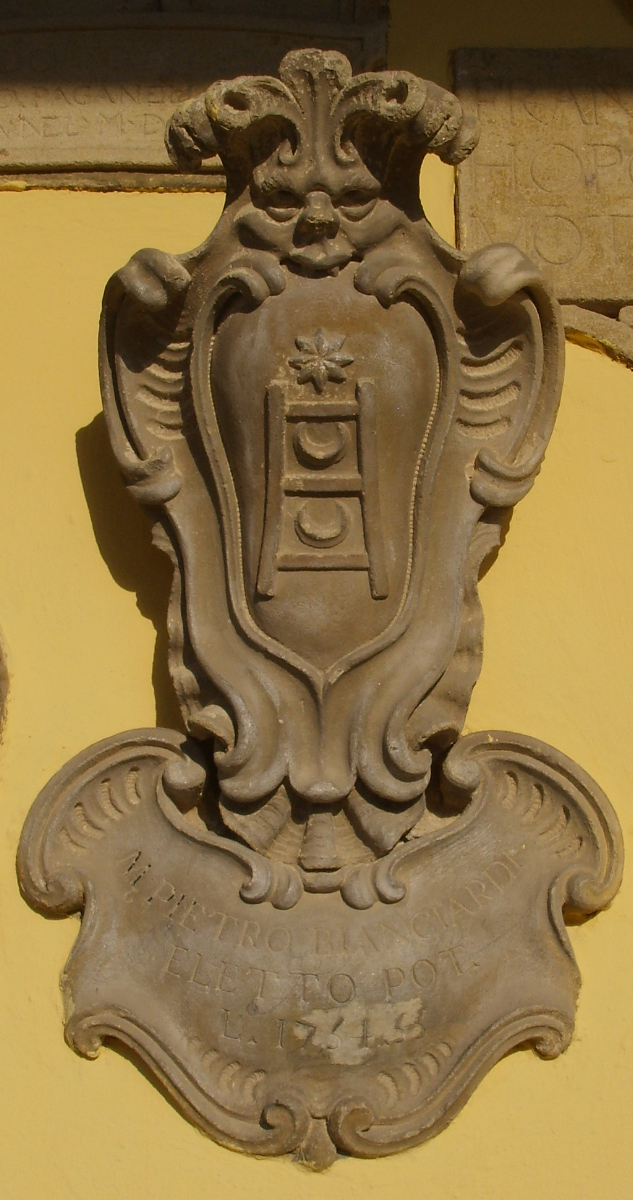
Coat of arms of Bianciardi in front of the Palazzo Pretorio in Fiesole, since 1764, a member of this family had been a Podestà ten years earlier.

During the Middle Ages, they were a noble family. Over the centuries, the family left several historical traces in Italy, especially in Tuscany, also because they maintained close friendships with the Catholic Church. The first sources date back to 1321, the year in which Pietro Bianciardi became a monk of the Camaldolese order, an order of scholars founded in 1009 by people of a certain economic power. Another testimony of power is found in 1358, in which the father Giovanni Bianciardi is one of the members that approves the Statutes of reformation of the Government of the Florentine Republic, in Florence. Known as a charitable family, every year they gave 100 florins each at the Hospital of Santa Maria Nuova. In 1435 Angelus Iacopo Bianciardi da Sommavilla purchased a palace from the Ricasoli family (which is, today, the oldest of all the families that formed the Florentine aristocracy and is one of the few still flourishing of feudal origin) in Castellina in Chianti, still in existence today. The palace became the family symbol starting from 1719 as Casa Bianciardi (today known as Palazzo Bianciardi). Until then, the palace was used as a holiday residence, since the family preferred instead to settle among Florence's high social class. In 1557 Giovanni and Agnolo di Pier Bianciardi bought other properties around Castellina. In 1622 Giuseppe Bianciardi was sent by the Republic as podestà to Castelfranco di Sopra. With the death of Bartolomeo Bianciardi, the family committed each year to distribute 10 scudi to the poor of the town. In the late 16th century, the Monitore Fiorentino honored the family as an example of honest and rich citizens who helped the impoverished.

=== Palazzo Bianciardi ===
The palace in Castellina in Chianti (Siena) dates back to the early 1400s. It has ten rooms on a total of two floors. For a period Casa Bianciardi hosted Pope Leo X. On his journeys to Rome, the Pope used to stay at the palace and even had a room of his own. Out of gratitude, he provided the de Medici coat of arms in the palace (still present next to the family crest). In 1864 a small theater was created inside the palace. In 2007 the palace was renovated. To date, some members of the Bianciardi family continue to live there; one of them is also a municipal assessor today.

==== The Oratory of Saint Francis ====
After the creation of an oratory in the Villaggio di Casalta built by Andrea Bianciardi in 1713, which was blessed on 21 October 1779 by the Pievano of Castellina Niccola Moggi for commission of the Bishop of Colle Buonamici, The palace contained a chapel dedicated to Saint Francis and a private oratory since 1747 by the will of Sig. Cap. Cosimo Bianciardi that, however, was canceled after six years. It will then be created again, making it public, in another room in the palace in 1805 by Filippo Bianciardi. There is a papal bull which attests that in the chapel of this noble family it is possible to confer the plenary indulgence on the day of St. Francis (4 October) and on the day of the forgiveness of Assisi (1 August).

== Surname ==
About people with the surname Bianciardi:

- Francesco Bianciardi (1570–1607), composer and organist also known in Latin translations as Bianchardus, Bianciarcus and Blanchardus, he was the Kapellmeister in Siena Cathedral. He was a member (a few years later elected leader) of the Accademia degli Intronati with the appellation of "Accordato". Banchieri considers him among the best composers of his time, along with Viadana and Agazzari. He was also among the first to introduce the Figured bass.
- Giovanni Battista Bianciardi (1745–1810), jockey (fantino) called Sorba. He won a race of the Palio of Siena in 1770.
- Stanislao Bianciardi (1811–1868) lawyer and classical scholar, he was especially a friend of Niccolò Tommaseo. He was a teacher in Florence in Protestant and Israelite Institutes of Italian and Latin literature. Over time, he translated several non-Catholic religious manuscripts and studied some literary works of antiquity such as the Divine Comedy.
- David Bianciardi (1827 – unknown), jockey (fantino) known as Il Sagrino. He competed in the Palio of Siena seven times, winning three times.
- Raffaele Bianciardi (1843–1901), military officer of the Order of Saints Maurice and Lazarus and of Military Order of Savoy, he intervened in the campaigns of Italian War of Independence. In 1890 he joined the 1st Bersaglieri Regiment. Among the various honors he received the medal croce d'oro con corona per anzianità di servizio for having served in the military for over 25 years.
- Enrico Bianciardi (1863–1918), anarchist. He was reported by the Ministry of the Interior as a "dangerous" element. Among his various interventions, he was against Italian intervention in the First World War.
- Luciano Bianciardi (1922–1971), journalist, translator and writer of short stories and novels. He contributed significantly to the cultural ferment in post-war Italy, working actively with various publishing houses, magazines and newspapers. His work is characterized by periods of rebellion against the cultural establishment, to which he also belonged, and by a careful analysis of social habits during Italian economic miracle.
- Carlo Bianciardi (born 1939), physicist and professor of information theory at the Information Engineering and Mathematics Department at the University of Siena. He has carried out research for many years on error correction codes, on the ecological applications of theory and on its extension to quantum sources. In the past he has also been headmaster of a classical lyceum.
- Giorgio Bianciardi (born 1954), medical scientist, astrobiology researcher and professor of general pathology at the Department of Medicine, Surgery and Neuroscience at the University of Siena. On 12 April 2012, he, Gilbert Levin, Joseph Miller, and Patricia Straat reported, based on complexity analysis of the Labeled Release experiments of the Viking program, data that may suggest the detection of "extant microbial life on Mars."

== See also ==
- 167ª Brigata SAP “Fratelli Bianciardi”, an Italian partisan brigade.
- 55418 Bianciardi, a minor planet.
- Bianciardino, character in Luigi Pulci's Morgante.
- Polo Bianciardi, High school institute located in Grosseto.
