= Aldegheri =

Aldegheri is an Italian surname. Notable people with this surname include:

- Dorian Aldegheri (born 1993), French rugby player
- Samuel Aldegheri (born 2001), Italian baseball player

== See also ==
- Aldighieri (disambiguation)
