= Sant'Agnese, Castellina in Chianti =

Sant'Agnese
- Frazione
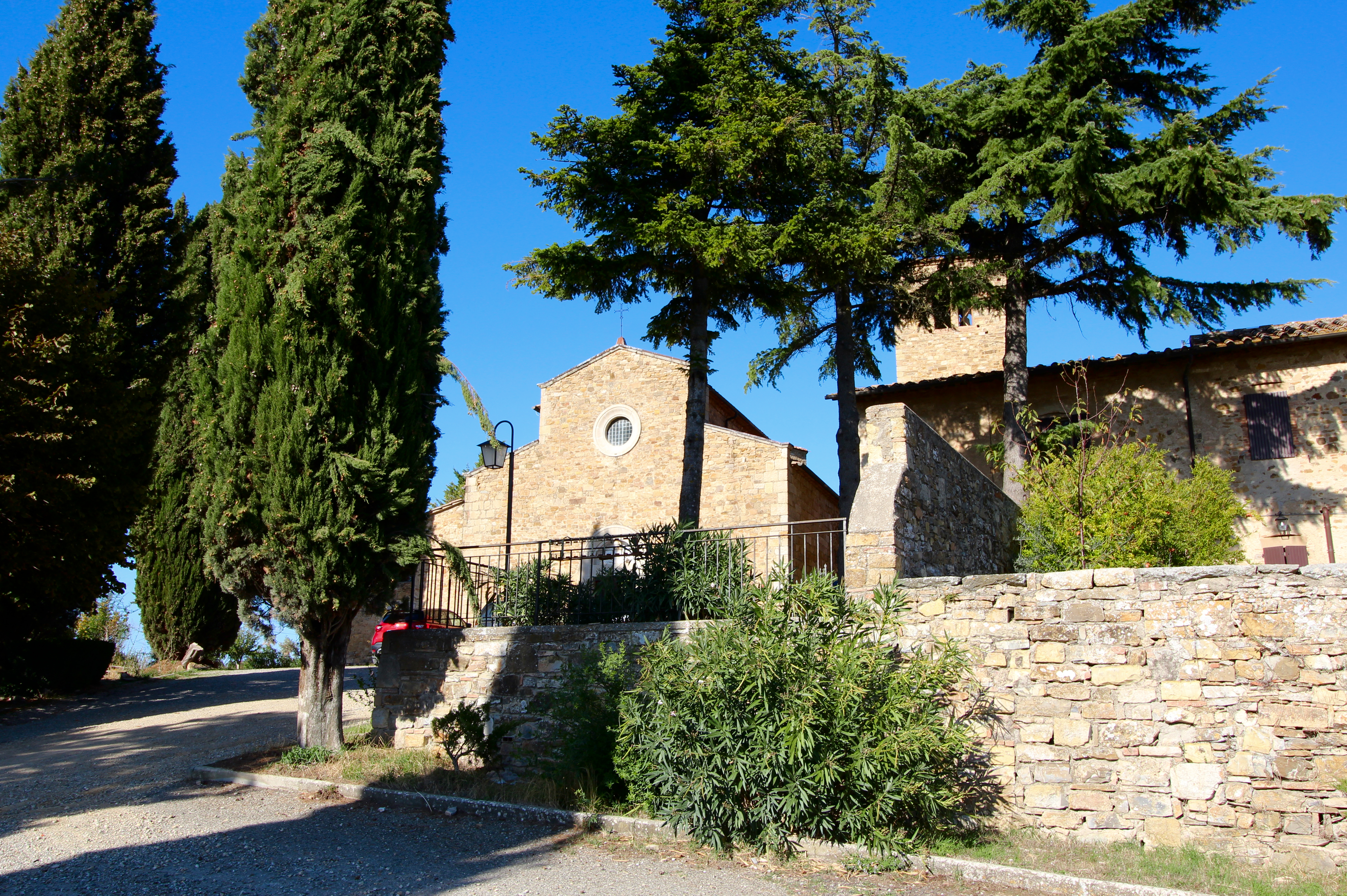
- The church of Sant'Agnese

- Location of Sant'Agnese in Italy
- Coordinates: 43°28′56″N 11°13′55″E
- Country: Italy
- Region: Tuscany
- Province: Siena (SI)
- Comune: Castellina in Chianti

Population (2018)
  - Total: 90
- Time zone: UTC+1 (CET)
  - Summer (DST): UTC+2 (CEST)

Sant'Agnese (or Sant'Agnese in Chianti) is a village in Tuscany, central Italy, administratively a frazione of the comune of Castellina in Chianti, province of Siena. At the time of the 2018 parish census its population was 90.

Sant'Agnese is about 33 km from Siena and 9 km from Castellina in Chianti.
