= Sicelle =

- Frazione
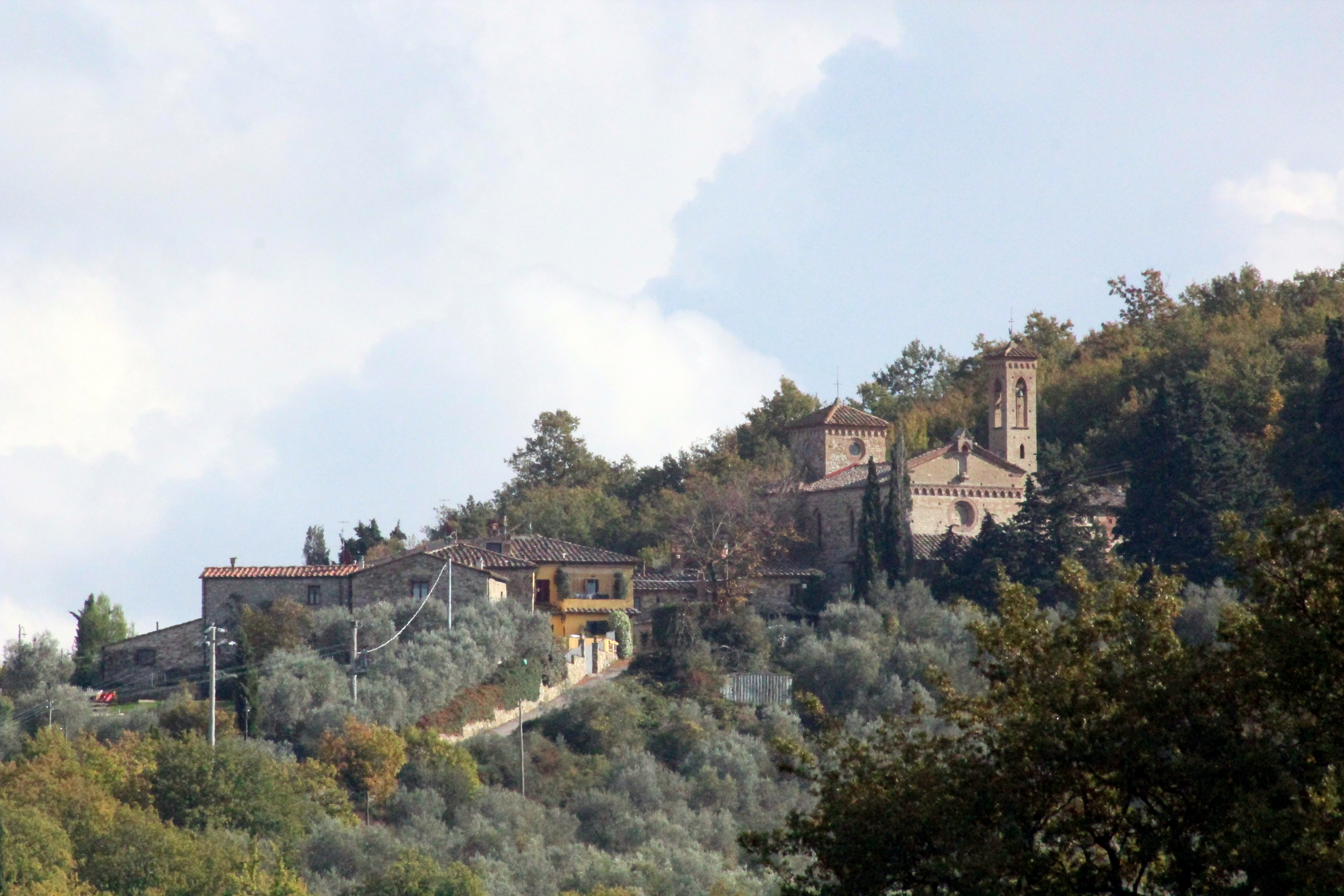
- View of Sicelle

- Location of Sicelle in Italy
- Coordinates: 43°32′6″N 11°16′19″E
- Country: Italy
- Region: Tuscany
- Province: Siena (SI)
- Comune: Castellina in Chianti
- Elevation: 390 m (1,280 ft)
- Time zone: UTC+1 (CET)
  - Summer (DST): UTC+2 (CEST)

Sicelle is a village in Tuscany, central Italy, located in the comune of Castellina in Chianti, province of Siena.

Sicelle is about 35 kilometres (22 mi) from Siena and 11 kilometres (6.8 mi) from Castellina in Chianti.

== Main sights ==
- Church of San Miniato

== Sources ==
- Emanuele Repetti (1841). "Sicelle". Dizionario geografico fisico storico della Toscana (in Italian). Vol. 5. Florence. p. 294.
