= Pietrafitta, Castellina in Chianti =

Pietrafitta
- Frazione
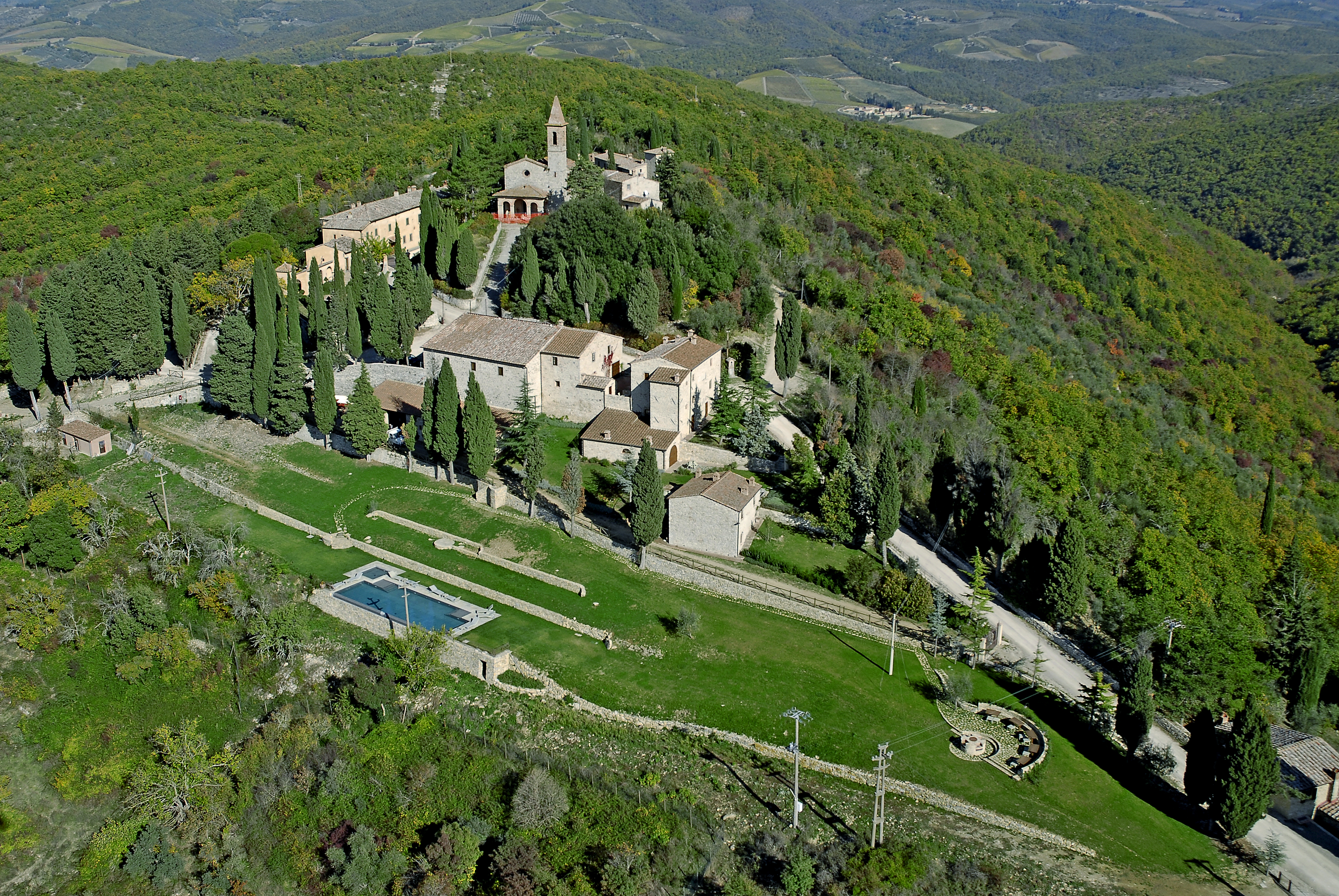
- View of Pietrafitta

- Location of Pietrafitta in Italy
- Coordinates: 43°29′39″N 11°18′14″E
- Country: Italy
- Region: Tuscany
- Province: Siena (SI)
- Comune: Castellina in Chianti
- Elevation: 568 m (1,864 ft)

Population (2018)
  - Total: 83
- Time zone: UTC+1 (CET)
  - Summer (DST): UTC+2 (CEST)

Pietrafitta is a village in Tuscany, central Italy, administratively a frazione of the comune of Castellina in Chianti, province of Siena. At the time of the 2018 parish census its population was 83.

Pietrafitta is about 30 km from Siena and 6 km from Castellina in Chianti.
