= Nativity of the Virgin (Master of the Osservanza Triptych) =

Painting by the Master of the Osservanza Triptych

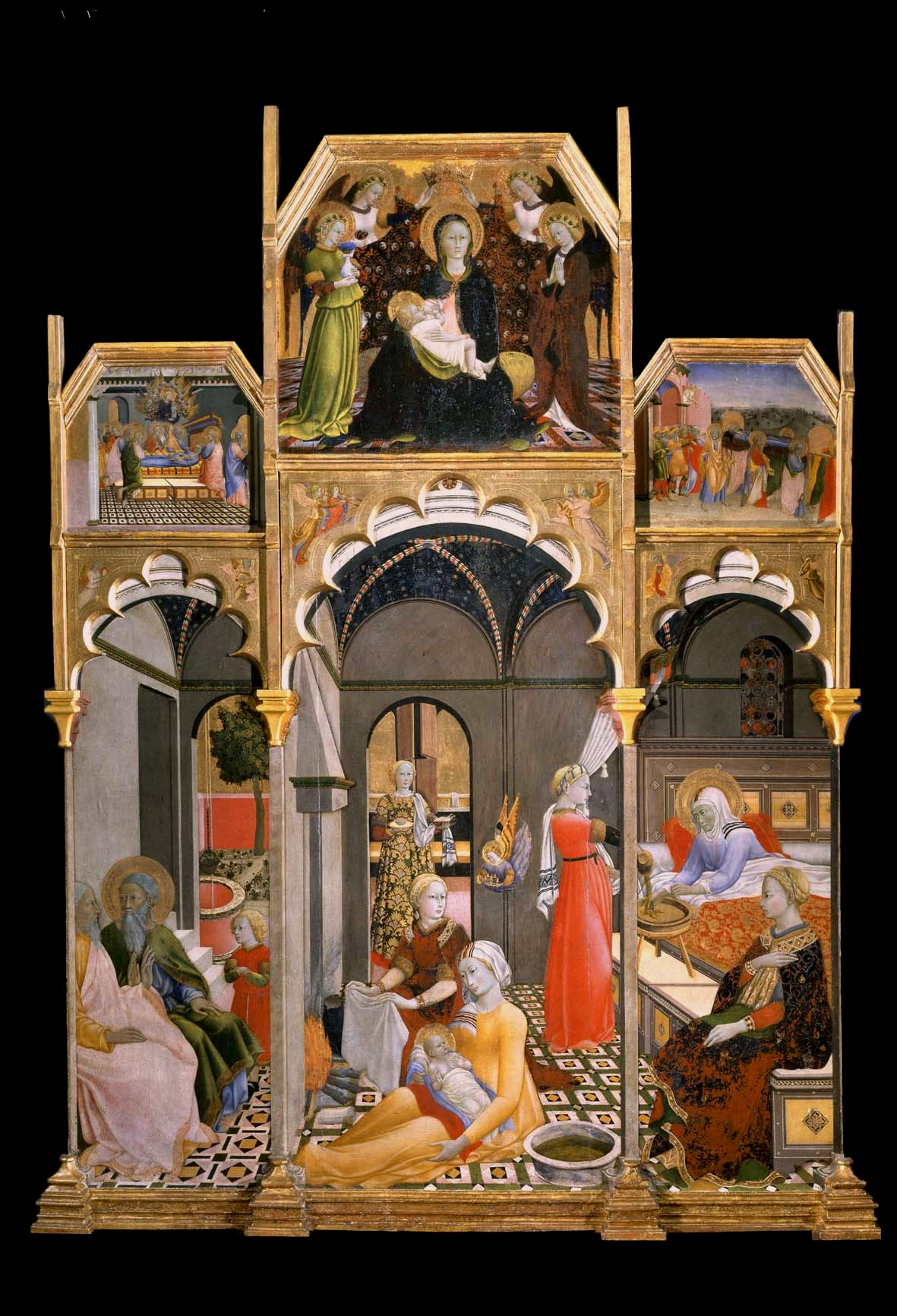
- Artist: Master of the Osservanza Triptych
- Year: circa 1430–1433
- Medium: tempera on panel
- Dimensions: 220 cm × 162 cm (87 in × 64 in)
- Location: Museo di palazzo Corboli, Asciano

Nativity of the Virgin is a tempera on panel painting by the Master of the Osservanza Triptych, dated to around 1430–1435 and now in the Museo di palazzo Corboli in Asciano. It was inspired by Pietro Lorenzetti's 1335–1342 painting of the same scene. Its three lower panels show the Nativity of the Virgin, whilst the three upper panels (from left to right) show Death of the Virgin, Madonna of Humility and Burial of the Virgin.

== Bibliography ==
- Stefano Zuffi, Grande atlante del Rinascimento, Electa, Milano 2007. ISBN 978-88-370-4898-3
