= La Piazza, Castellina in Chianti =

La Piazza
- Frazione
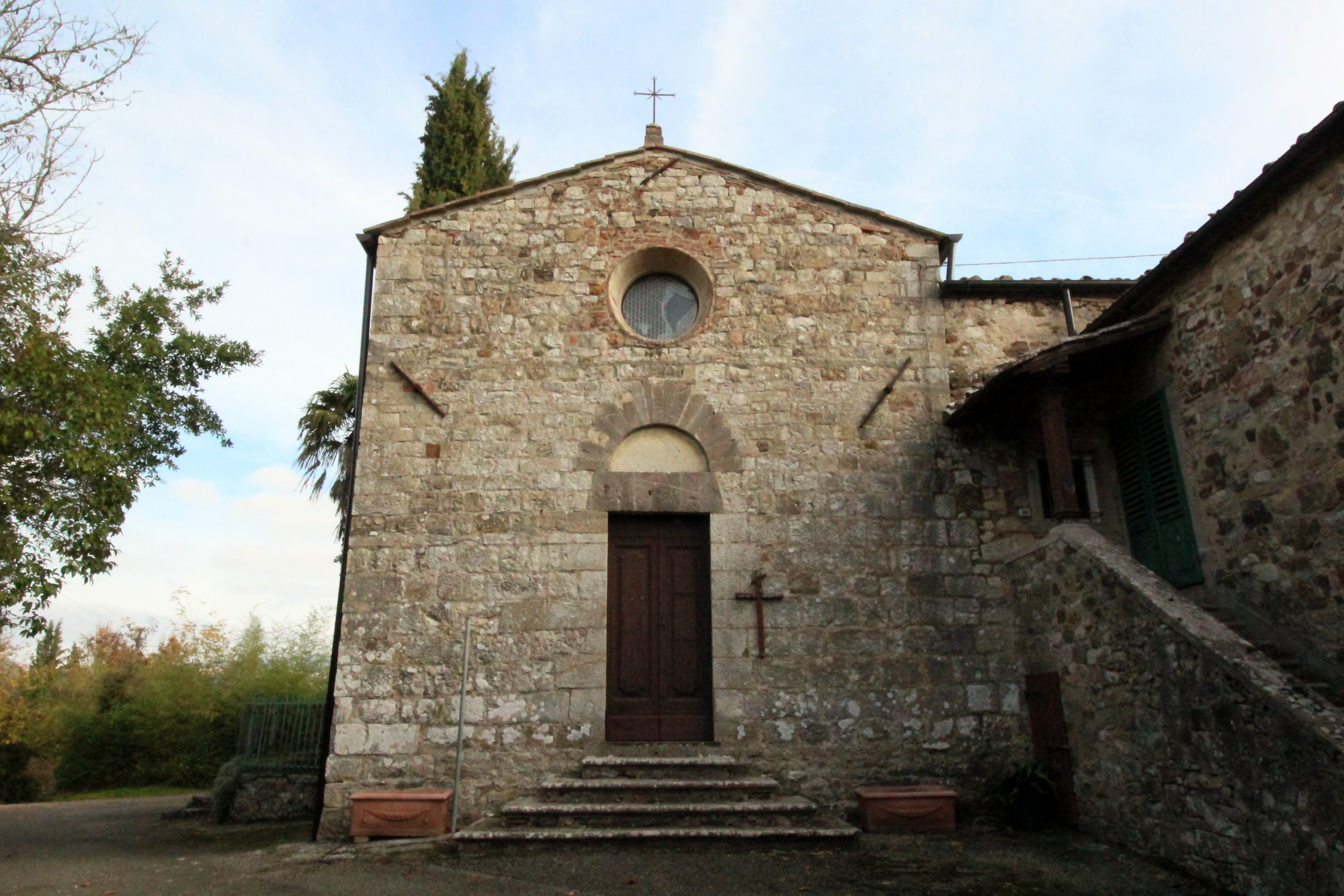
- The church of San Giorgio alla Piazza

- Location of La Piazza in Italy
- Coordinates: 43°31′46″N 11°17′6″E
- Country: Italy
- Region: Tuscany
- Province: Siena (SI)
- Comune: Castellina in Chianti
- Elevation: 348 m (1,142 ft)

Population (2011)
  - Total: 20
- Demonym: Piazzini / Piazzaioli
- Time zone: UTC+1 (CET)
  - Summer (DST): UTC+2 (CEST)

La Piazza (or Piazza) is a village in Tuscany, central Italy, administratively a frazione of the comune of Castellina in Chianti, province of Siena. At the time of the 2001 census its population was 36.

La Piazza is about 36 km from Siena and 9 km from Castellina in Chianti.
