= San Leonino =

- Frazione
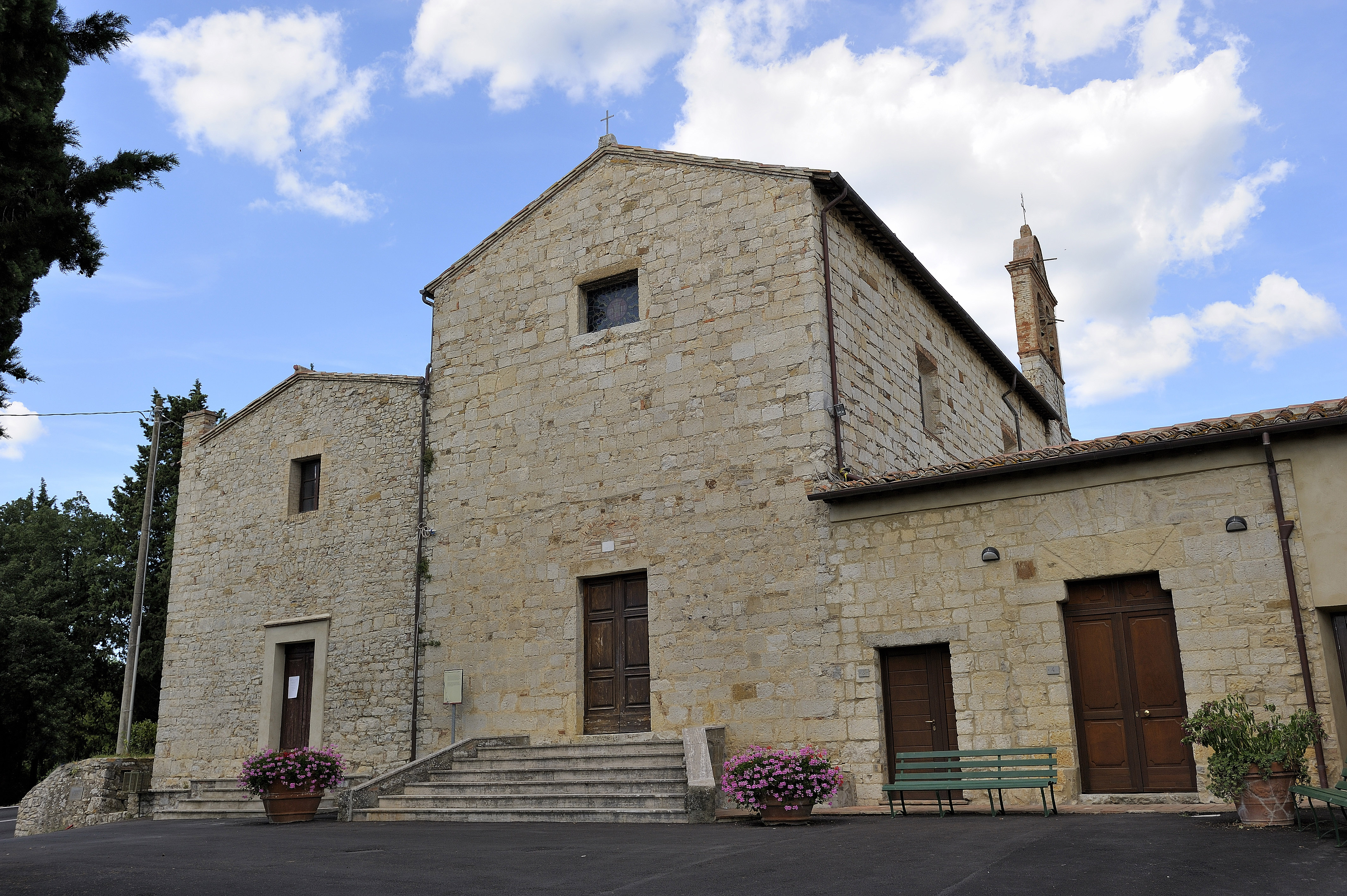
- The church of San Leonino in Conio

- Location of San Leonino in Italy
- Coordinates: 43°25′12″N 11°17′50″E
- Country: Italy
- Region: Tuscany
- Province: Siena (SI)
- Comune: Castellina in Chianti
- Elevation: 368 m (1,207 ft)

Population (2011)
  - Total: 26
- Time zone: UTC+1 (CET)
  - Summer (DST): UTC+2 (CEST)

San Leonino is a village in Tuscany, central Italy, administratively a frazione of the comune of Castellina in Chianti, province of Siena. At the time of the 2001 census its population was 11.

San Leonino is about 19 km from Siena and 7 km from Castellina in Chianti.
