= Lilliano =

- Frazione
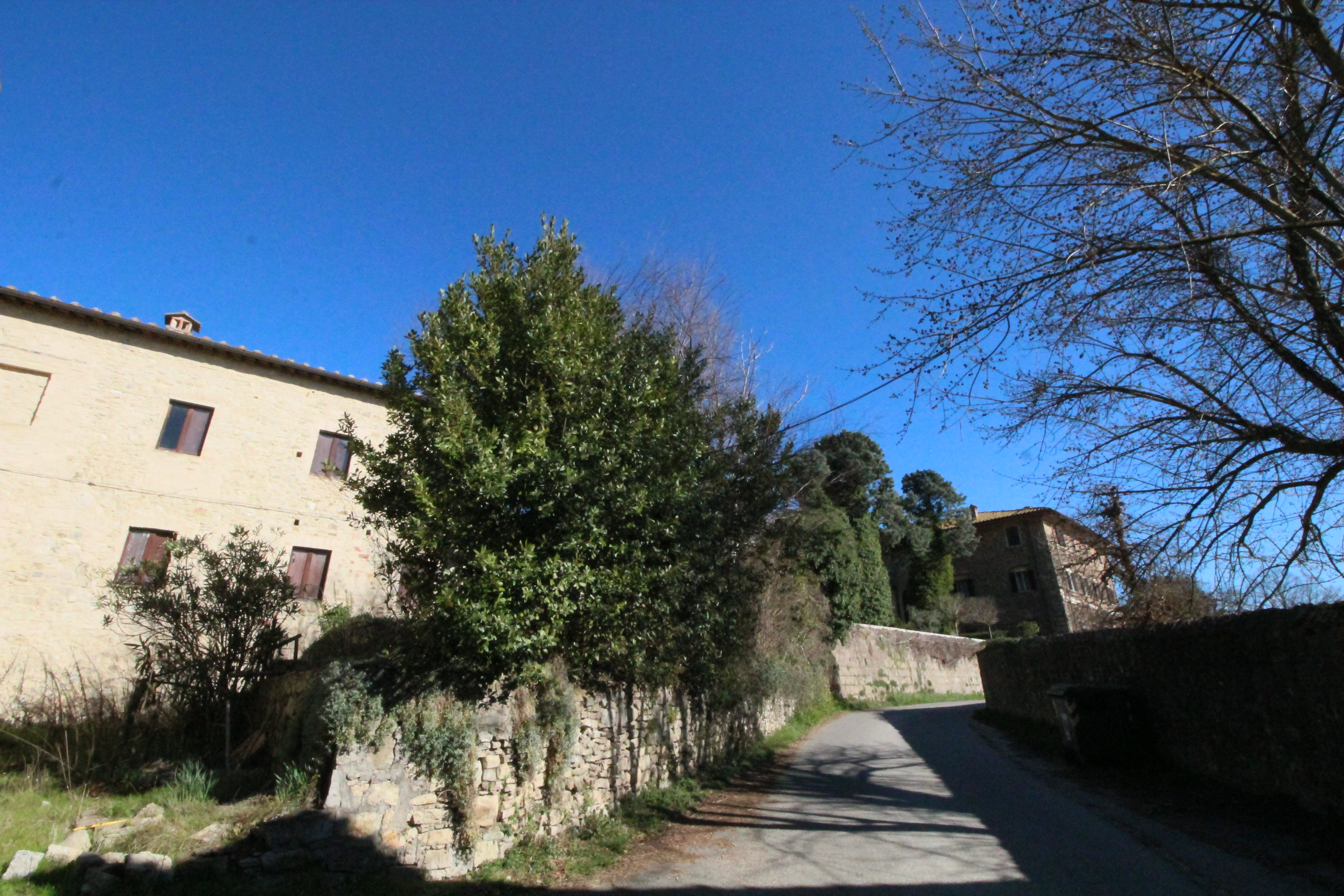

- Location of Lilliano in Italy
- Coordinates: 43°26′14″N 11°15′15″E
- Country: Italy
- Region: Tuscany
- Province: Siena (SI)
- Comune: Castellina in Chianti
- Elevation: 304 m (997 ft)

Population (2011)
  - Total: 17
- Demonym: Lilianesi
- Time zone: UTC+1 (CET)
  - Summer (DST): UTC+2 (CEST)

Lilliano is a village in Tuscany, central Italy, administratively a frazione of the comune of Castellina in Chianti, province of Siena. At the time of the 2001 census its population was 15.

Lilliano is about 26 km from Siena and 9 km from Castellina in Chianti.
