= Rencine =

- Frazione
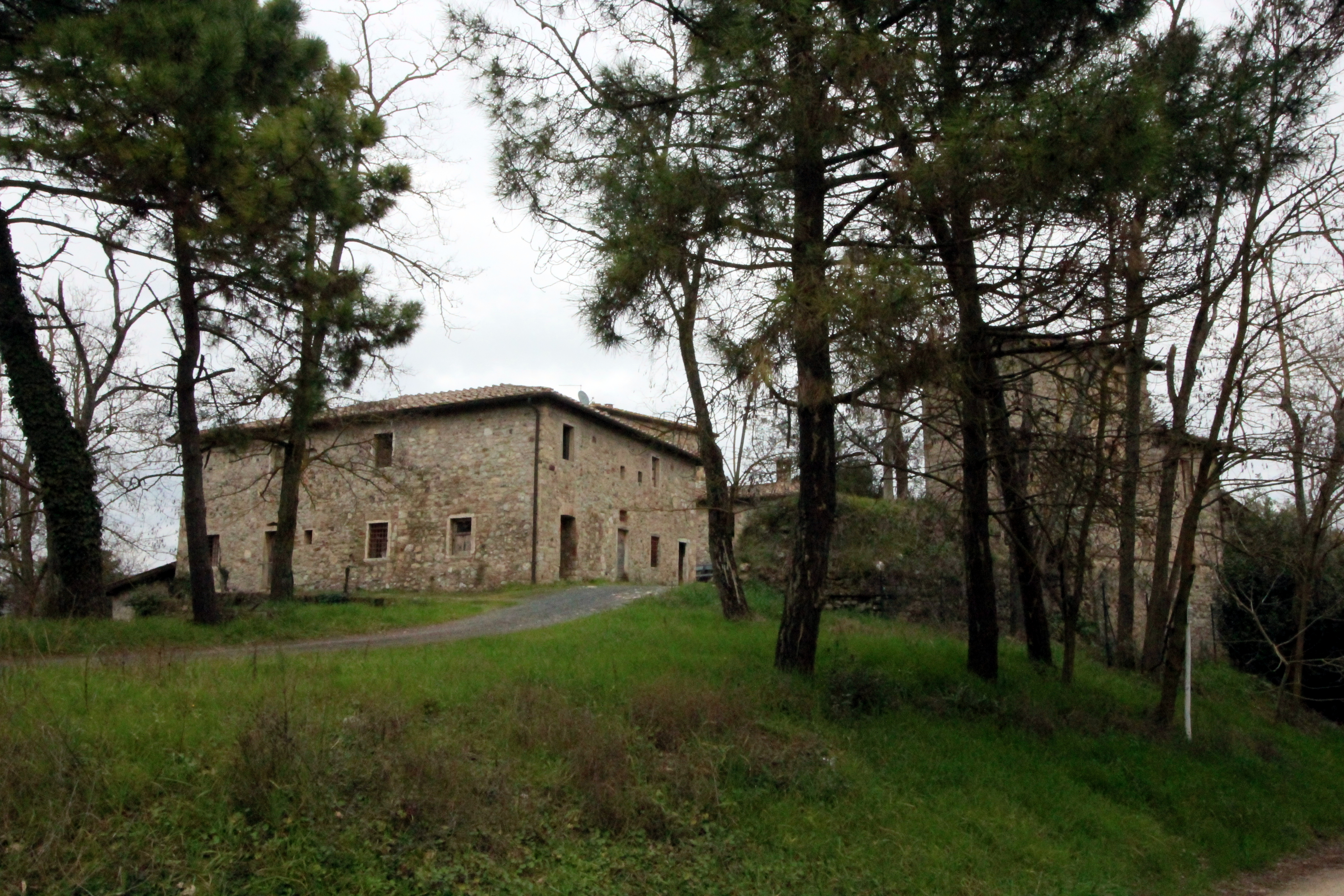

- Location of Rencine in Italy
- Coordinates: 43°24′20″N 11°13′54″E
- Country: Italy
- Region: Tuscany
- Province: Siena (SI)
- Comune: Castellina in Chianti
- Elevation: 284 m (932 ft)

Population (2011)
  - Total: 50
- Time zone: UTC+1 (CET)
  - Summer (DST): UTC+2 (CEST)

Rencine is a village in Tuscany, central Italy, administratively a frazione of the comune of Castellina in Chianti, province of Siena.

Rencine is about 23 km from Siena and 15 km from Castellina in Chianti.
