= Aldighieri =

Aldighieri is an Italian surname. Notable people with the surname include:

- Bob Aldighieri (born 1965), American freestyle skier
- Gottardo Aldighieri (1824–1906), Italian operatic baritone
- Maria Spezia-Aldighieri (1828–1907), Italian operatic soprano, wife of Gottardo

== See also ==
- Aldegheri (disambiguation)
- Aldighieri da Zevio (c. 1330 – c. 1390), Italian painter
