= Fonterutoli =

- Frazione
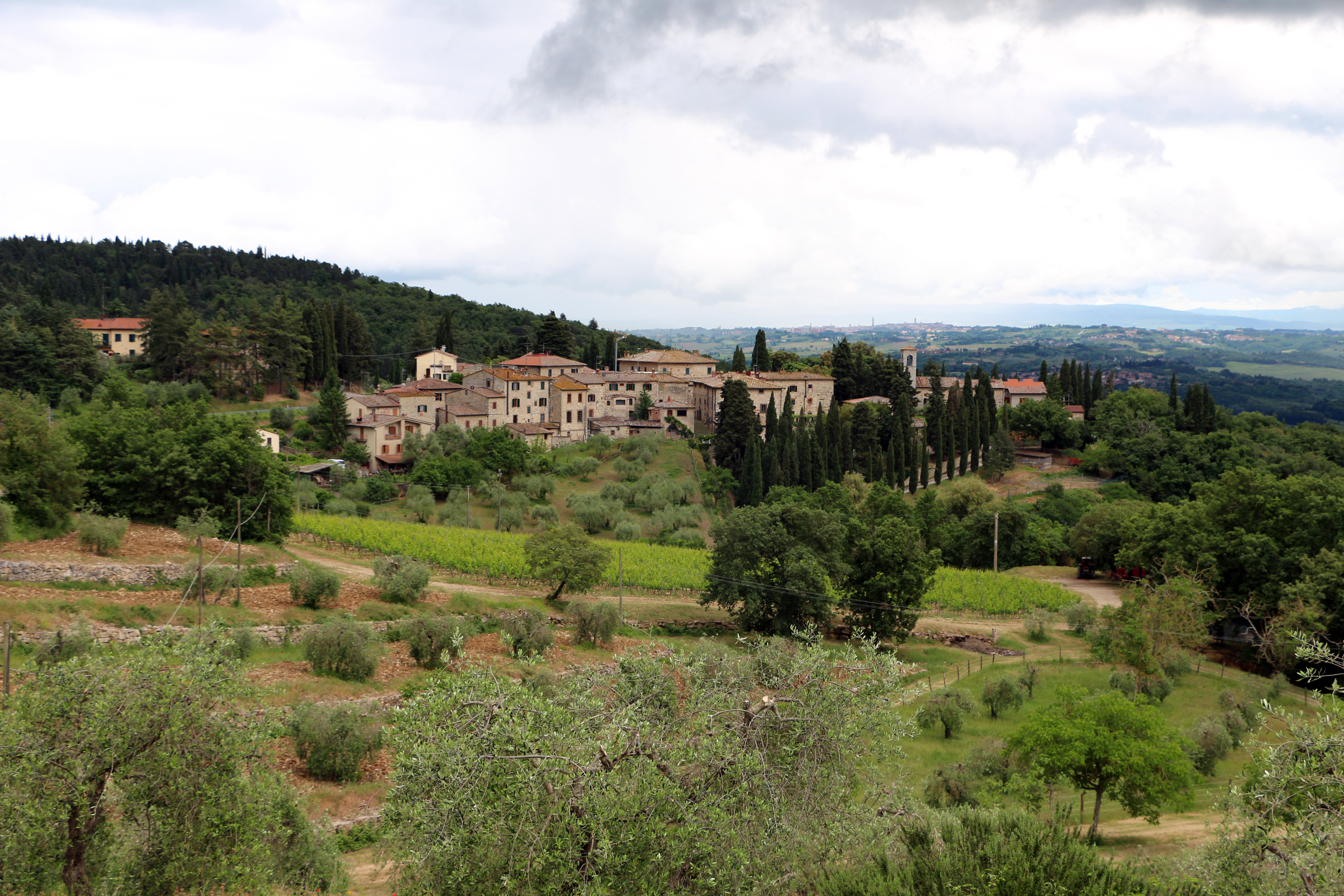
- View of Fonterutoli

- Location of Fonterutoli in Italy
- Coordinates: 43°26′9″N 11°18′24″E
- Country: Italy
- Region: Tuscany
- Province: Siena (SI)
- Comune: Castellina in Chianti
- Elevation: 502 m (1,647 ft)

Population (2011)
  - Total: 80
- Demonym: Fonterutolesi
- Time zone: UTC+1 (CET)
  - Summer (DST): UTC+2 (CEST)

Fonterutoli is a village in Tuscany, central Italy, administratively a frazione of the comune of Castellina in Chianti, province of Siena. At the time of the 2001 census its population was 80.

Fonterutoli is about 20 km from Siena and 5 km from Castellina in Chianti.
