= Castellina in Chianti =

- Comune
- Comune di Castellina in Chianti
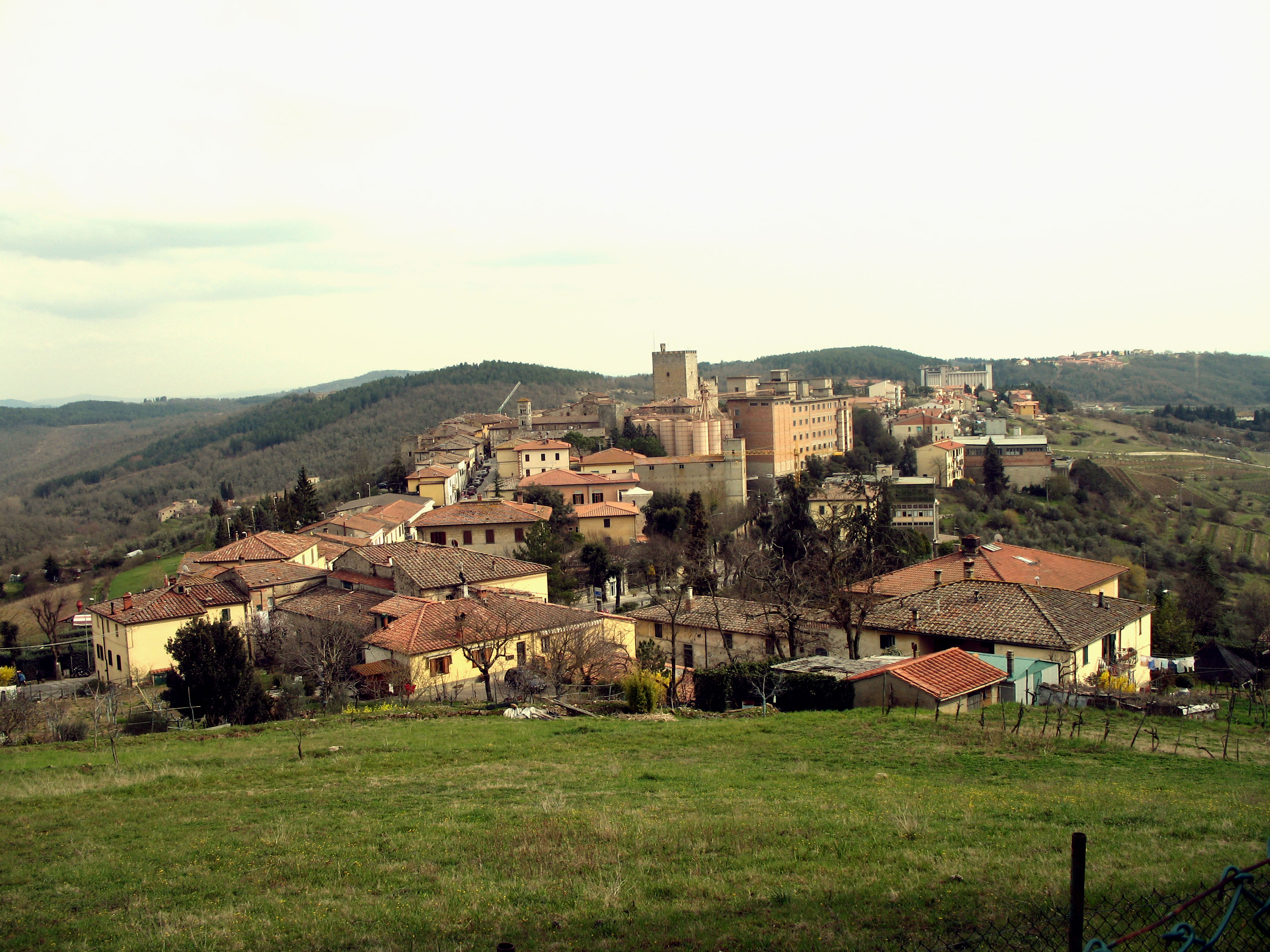

- Coat of arms

- Location within Italy Location within Tuscany
- Coordinates: 43°28′09″N 11°17′19″E
- Country: Italy
- Region: Tuscany
- Province: Siena (SI)
- Frazioni: Fonterutoli, La Piazza, Lilliano, Pietrafitta, Rencine, San Leonino, Sant'Agnese, Sicelle

Government
  - Mayor: Marcello Bonechi

Area
  - Total: 99.8 km^{2} (38.5 sq mi)
- Elevation: 578 m (1,896 ft)

Population (28 February 2017)
  - Total: 2,859
  - Density: 28.6/km^{2} (74.2/sq mi)
- Demonym: Castellinesi
- Time zone: UTC+1 (CET)
  - Summer (DST): UTC+2 (CEST)
- Postal code: 53011
- Dialing code: 0577
- Patron saint: St. Faustus
- Saint day: September 18
- Website: Official website

Castellina in Chianti is a comune (municipality) of c. 2,800 inhabitants in the province of Siena, in the Italian region Tuscany, located about 35 kilometres (22 mi) south of Florence and about 15 kilometres (9 mi) northwest of Siena. It is part of the Chianti Hills, between the valleys of the Arbia, Pesa and Elsa rivers.

The territory of Castellina in Chianti borders the following municipalities: Barberino Val d'Elsa, Castelnuovo Berardenga, Greve in Chianti, Monteriggioni, Poggibonsi, Radda in Chianti, Tavarnelle Val di Pesa.

== History ==
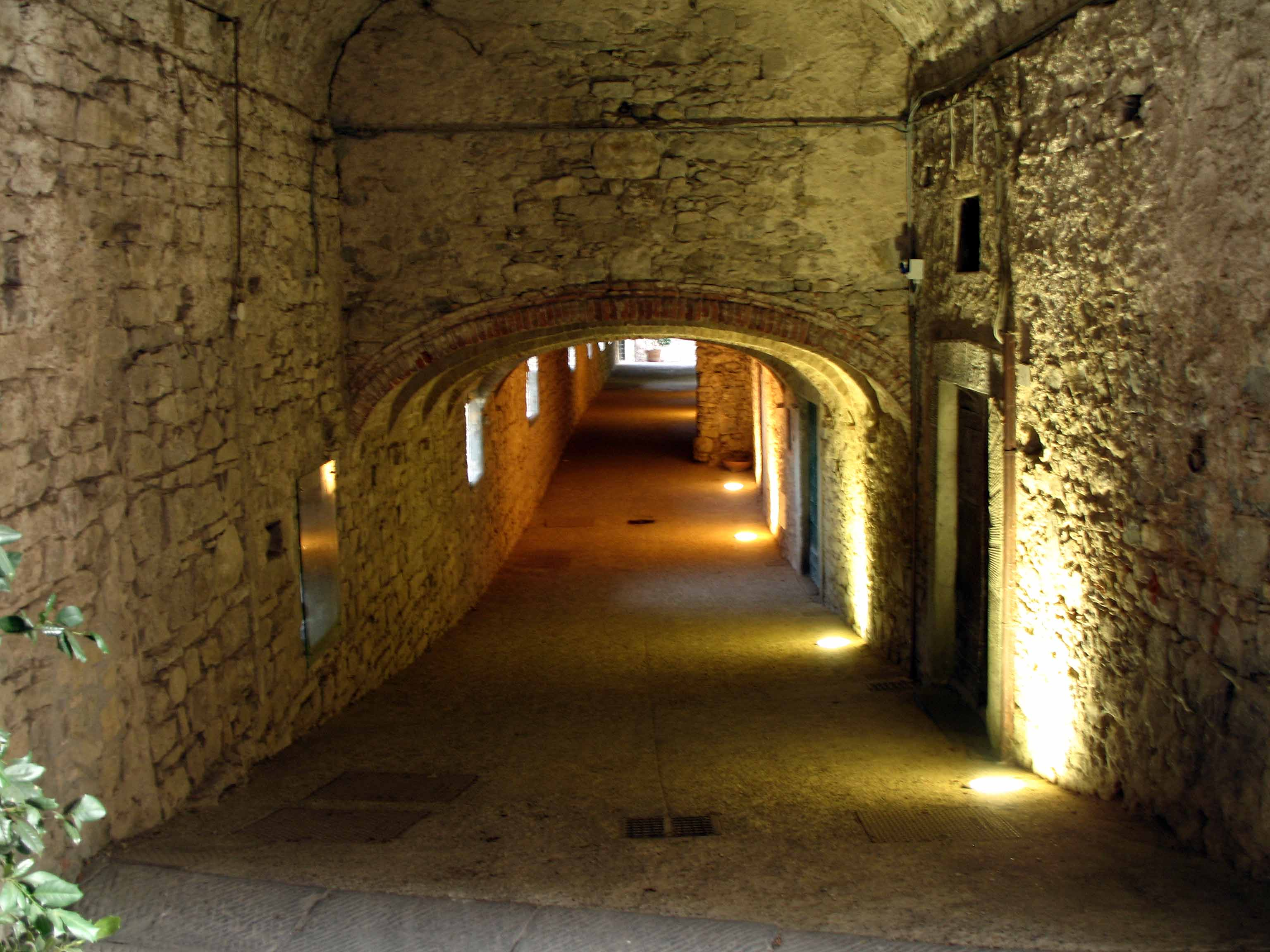
The entrance of the Via delle Volte

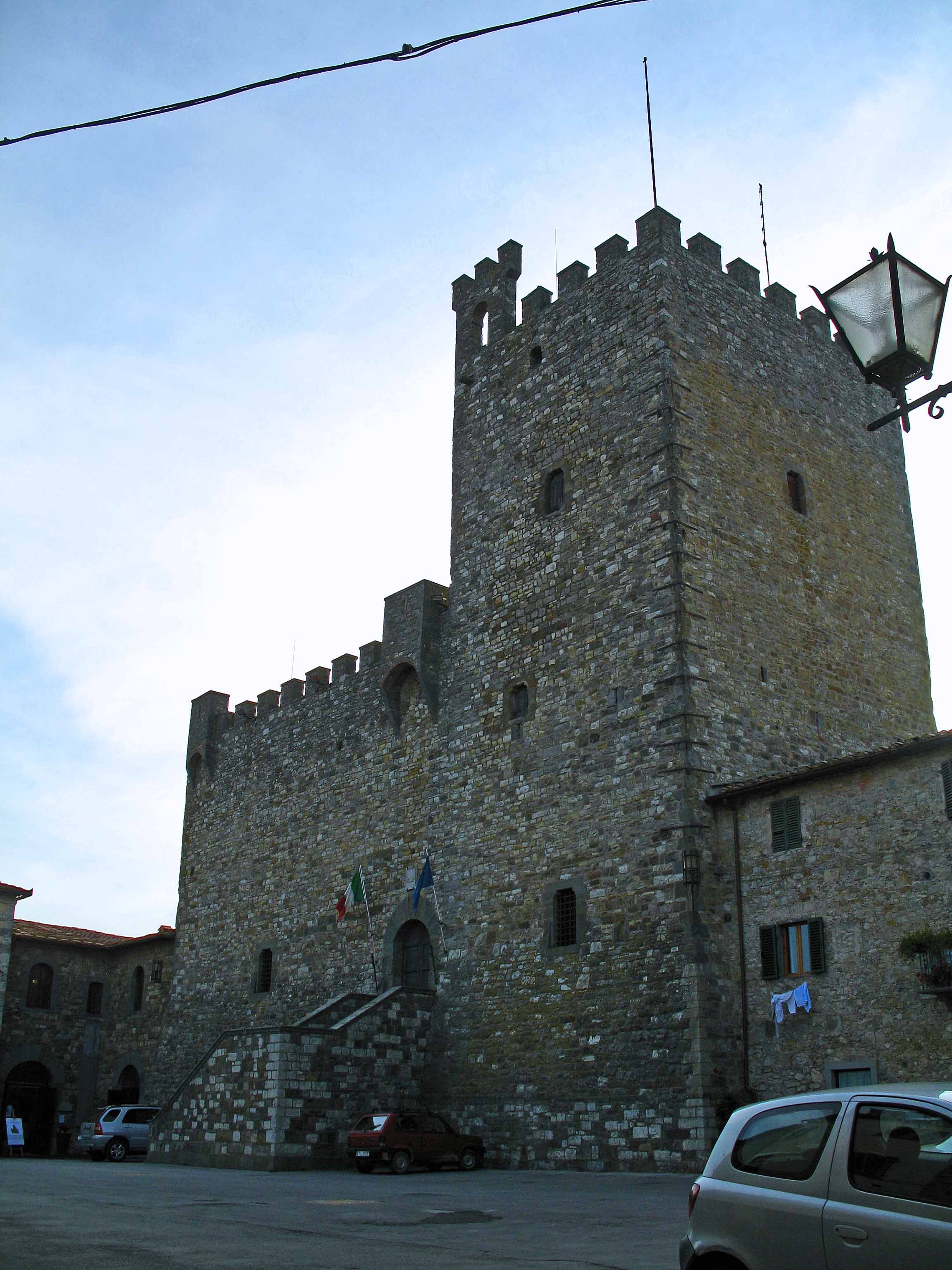
The Rocca of Castellina

The first settlements in the area dates from the Etruscan age, and they were probably devastated by Gaulish invasions at the time of the latter's invasions against Rome.

In the early Middle Ages the town was known as Salingolpe; in the 11th century Matilda of Tuscany gave it as fief to the counts Guidi and, subsequently, to the Trebbio. In the early 15th century it became a stronghold, of which today the Rocca remain.

== Main sights ==
- The massive Rocca (castle), with a huge 14th-century tower. It houses a small Etruscan museum.
- Church of San Salvatore, with an early 15th-century fresco of Madonna with Child and a polychrome wooden statue of Christ from the same age.
- Palazzo Ugolini-Squarcialupi.
- Palazzo Bianciardi.
- The Via delle Volte tunnel.
- Montecalvario Mound, outside the town. It consists of four 7th-6th century BC tombs.
- Poggino necropolis, also in the neighbourhood.
- Romanesque church of San Martino, at Cispiano
- Church of San Giorgio alla Piazza, housing a 15th panel from Cosimo Rosselli's workshop.
- Pieve of Sant'Agnese, with a Madonna with Child by Bicci di Lorenzo.

== Demographic evolution ==
Historical population

Year	Pop.	±%
1861	3,635	—
1871	3,973	+9.3%
1881	4,112	+3.5%
1901	4,744	+15.4%
1911	4,886	+3.0%

Year	Pop.	±%
1921	5,004	+2.4%
1931	5,119	+2.3%
1936	5,159	+0.8%
1951	4,886	−5.3%
1961	3,647	−25.4%

Year	Pop.	±%
1971	2,917	−20.0%
1981	2,681	−8.1%
1991	2,508	−6.5%
2001	2,673	+6.6%

Source: Data from ISTAT

== See also ==
- History of Chianti
