= Master of the Osservanza Triptych =

Italian painter

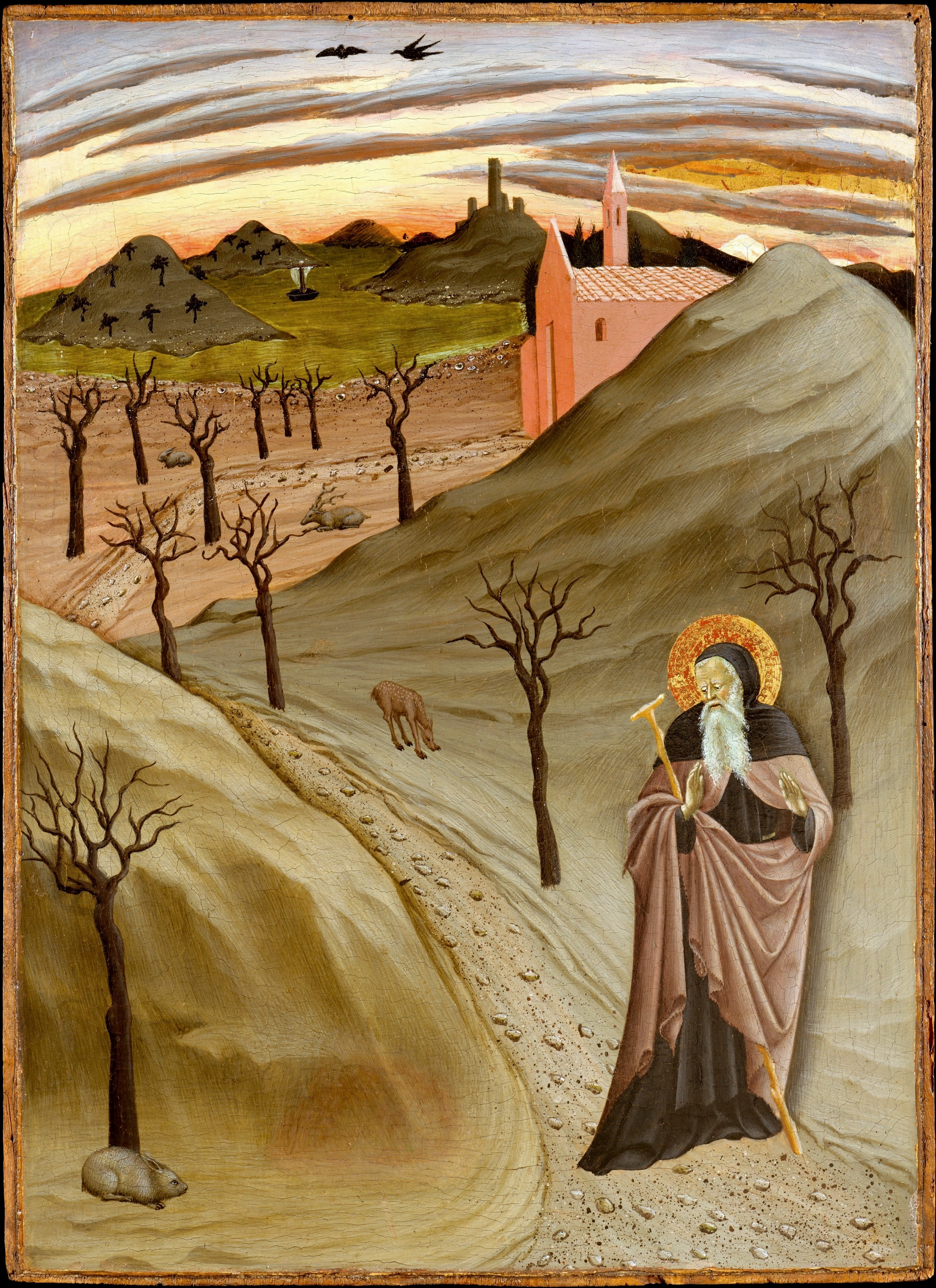
Saint Anthony Abbot Tempted by a Heap of Gold, c. 1435, Metropolitan Museum of Art

The Master of the Osservanza Triptych, also known as the Osservanza Master and as the Master of Osservanza, is the name given to an Italian painter of the Sienese school active about 1430 to 1450.

The Italian scholar Roberto Longhi recognized that two triptychs formerly attributed to Stefano di Giovanni (Sassetta) were the work of another hand, now generally referred to as the Master of the Osservanza Triptych. The Virgin and Child with St. Jerome and St. Ambrose (Basilica dell'Osservanza, Siena) and the Birth of the Virgin (Museo d'Arte Sacra, Asciano) are both stylistically similar to the work of Sassetta, but have a narrative expression that is characteristic of Late Gothic painting.

Longhi observed that another group of paintings was closely related to these works and appeared to be by the same hand. These include the predella of the Osservanza Altarpiece (Pinacoteca Nazionale, Siena), a predella of St. Bartholomew (Pinacoteca Nazionale, Siena), scenes of the Passion (Vatican Museums, Philadelphia Museum of Art, and Fogg Art Museum), The Resurrection (Detroit Institute of Arts), and Scenes from the Life of St. Anthony Abbot (panels in the National Gallery of Art, Washington, D.C., the Metropolitan Museum of Art, the Yale University Art Gallery and Museum Wiesbaden, Germany). Additionally, the full-length painting of St. Anthony Abbot in the Louvre appears to be from another altarpiece by the same master.

Research in 2010 by Maria Falcone in Siena has revealed the name of the master to be Sano di Pietro. Falcone found a document about an altarpiece by the "Master of Osservanza" for a church in Asciano, just outside Siena, which was actually under the Bishopric of Arezzo. The priest of the church in Asciano did not pay the painter and therefore the city government of Siena had to make an appeal to the bishop in Arezzo to force the priest from his district to pay the artist. The artist's name was included on the document as Sano di Pietro.

== Gallery ==
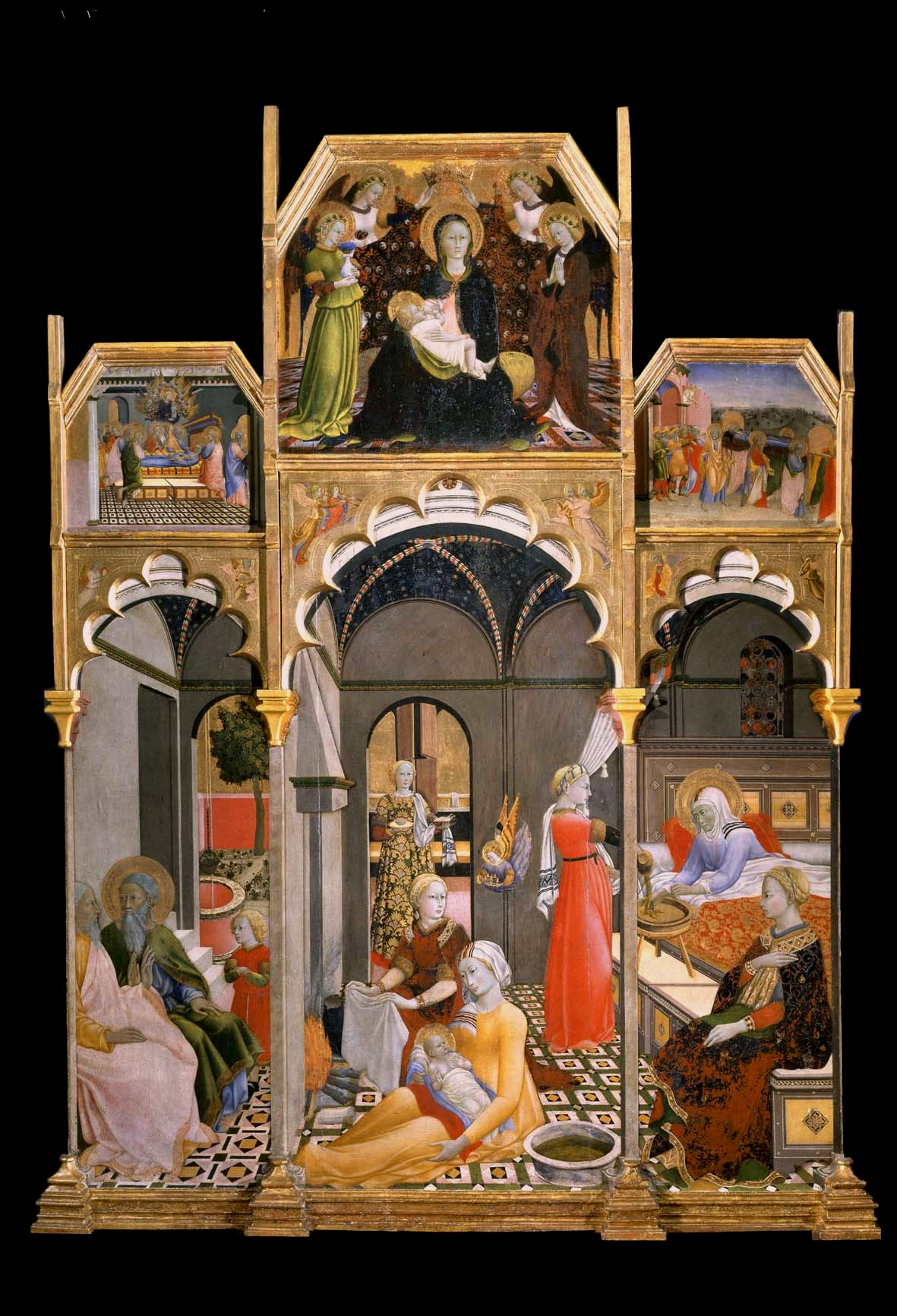
Birth of the Virgin with other Scenes from her Life, c. 1428–1439, Museo d'Arte Sacra, Asciano

Burial of Saint Monica and Saint Augustine Departing from Africa, c. 1430,
Tempera and gold on vellum, (24.7 x 27 cm) Cambridge, Fitzwilliam Museum

Saint Anthony at the Mass (detail, panel of Saint Anthony Abbot Altarpiece), c. 1430–1435, Staatliche Museen, Berlin, Germany

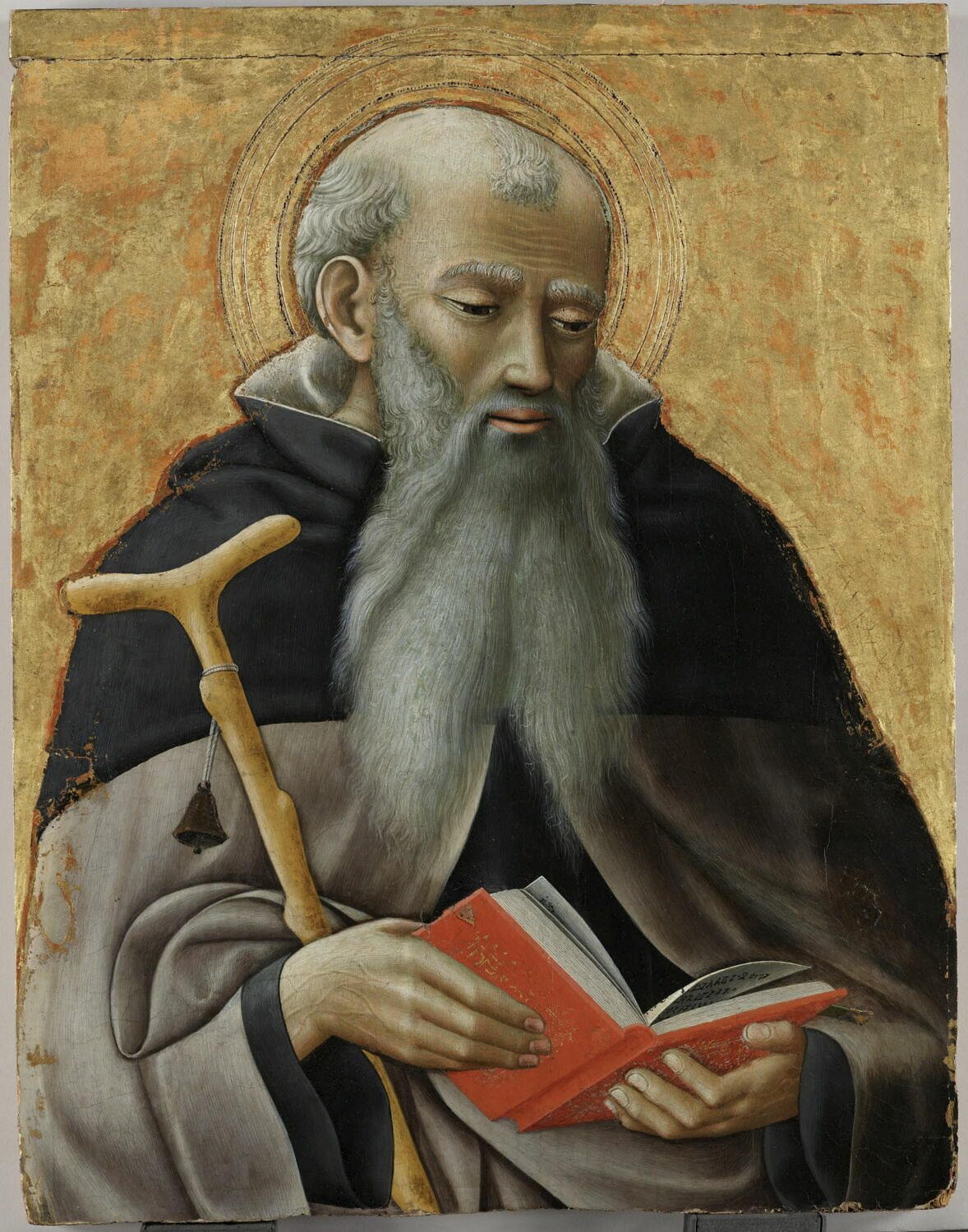
Saint Anthony, 1436, Louvre, Paris

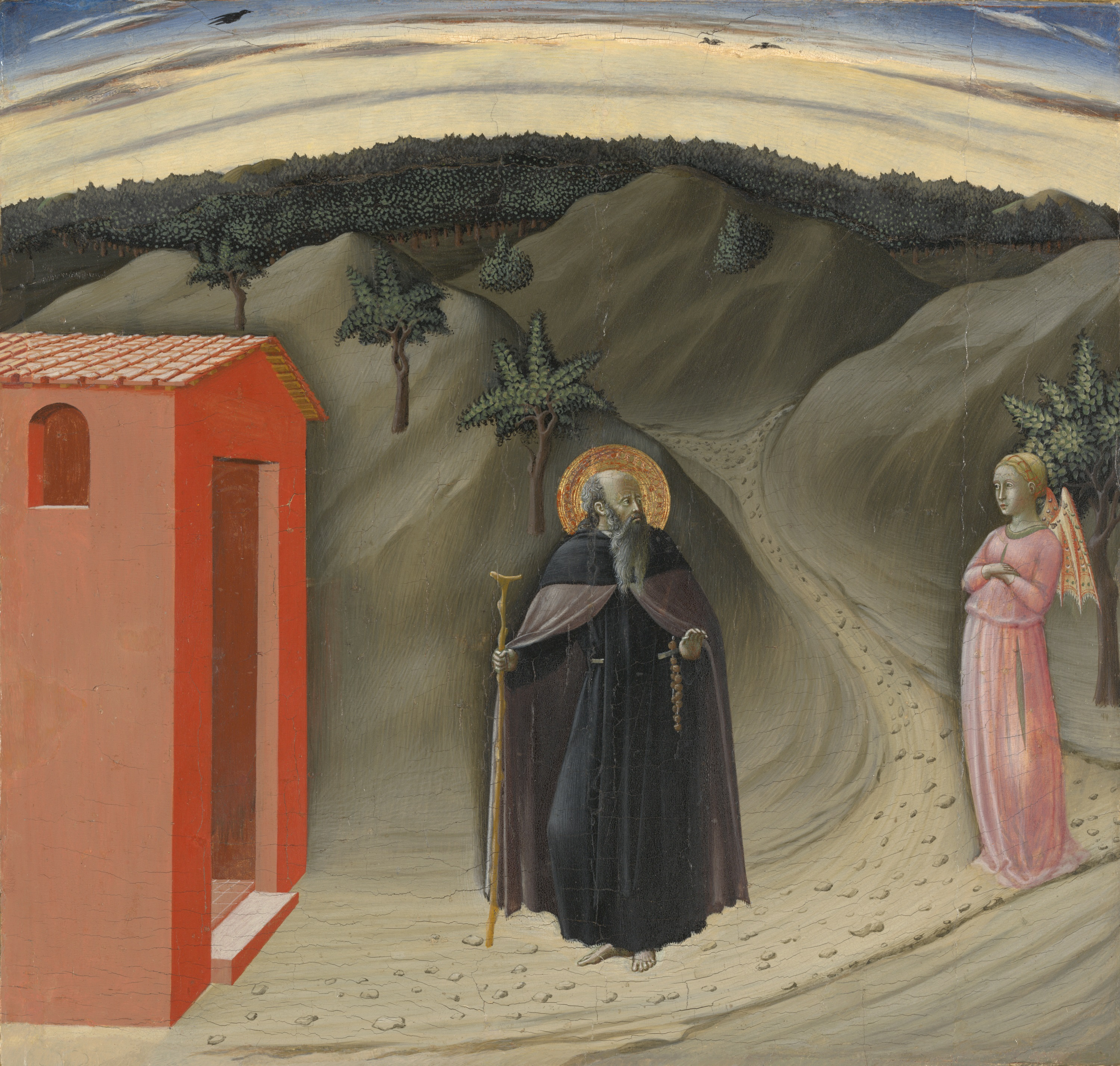
The Temptation of Saint Anthony Abbot, c. 1440, Yale University Art Gallery, New Haven, US

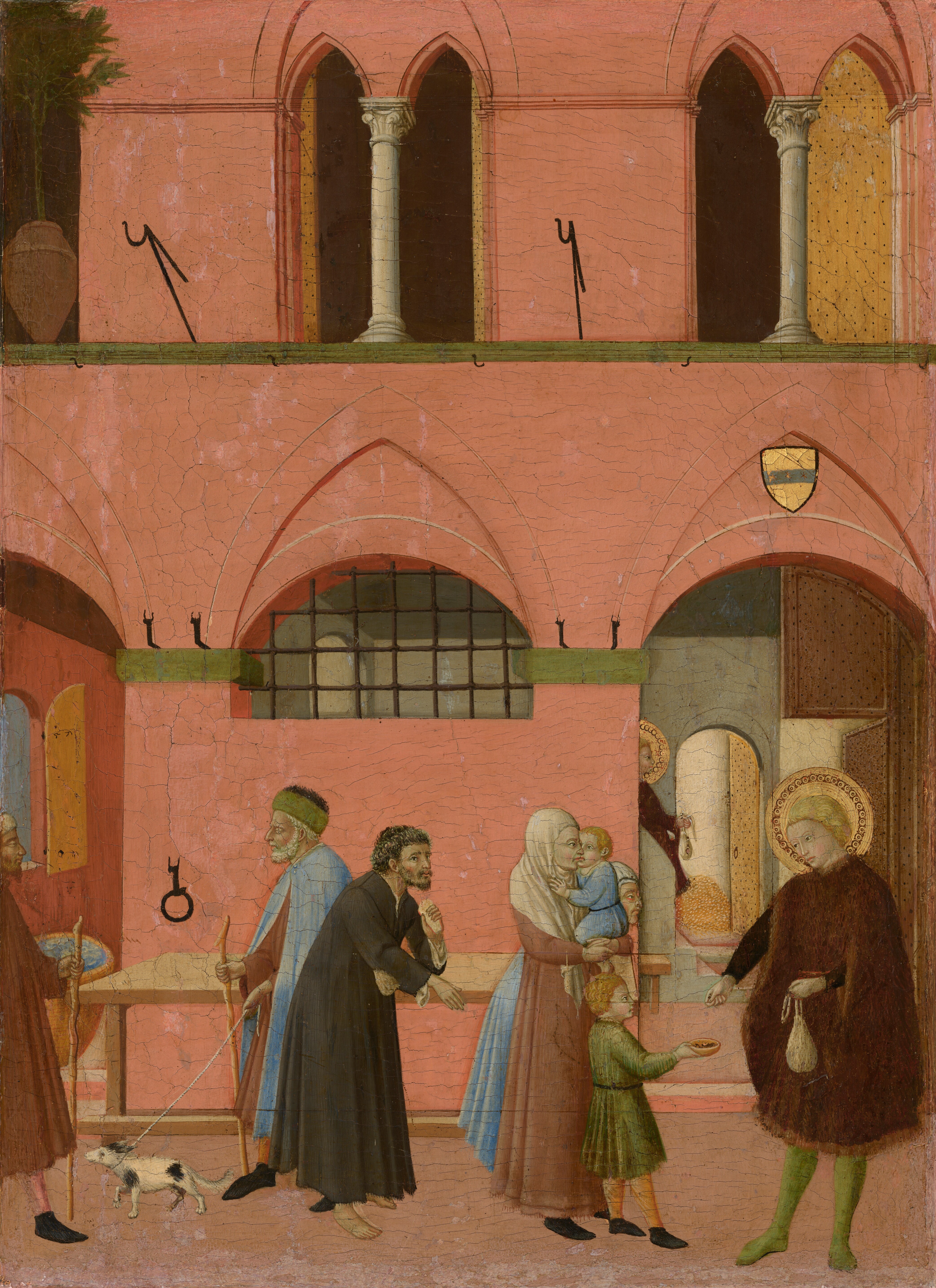
Saint Anthony Distributing his Wealth to the Poor, c. 1440

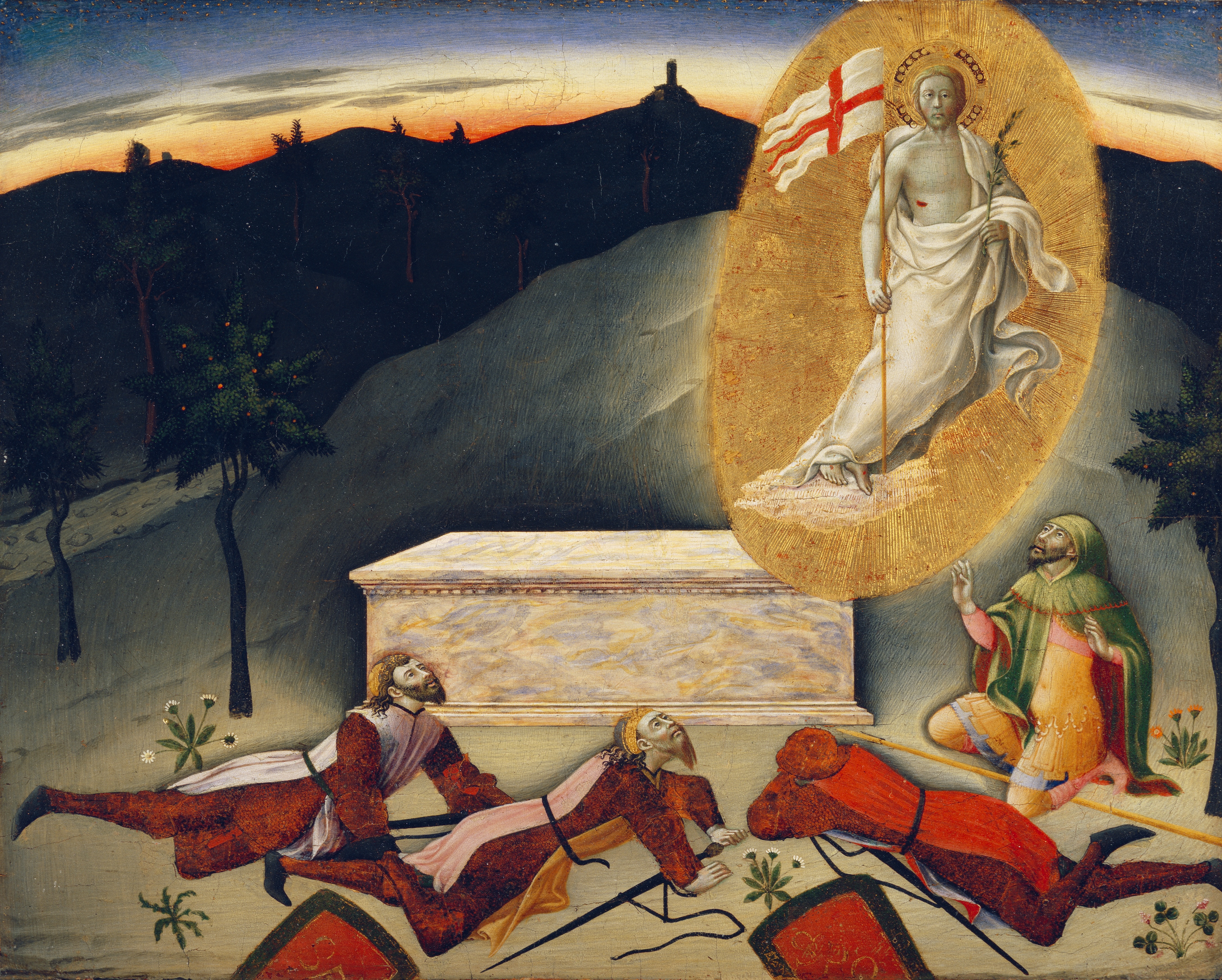
The Resurrection, c. 1445, Detroit Institute of Arts

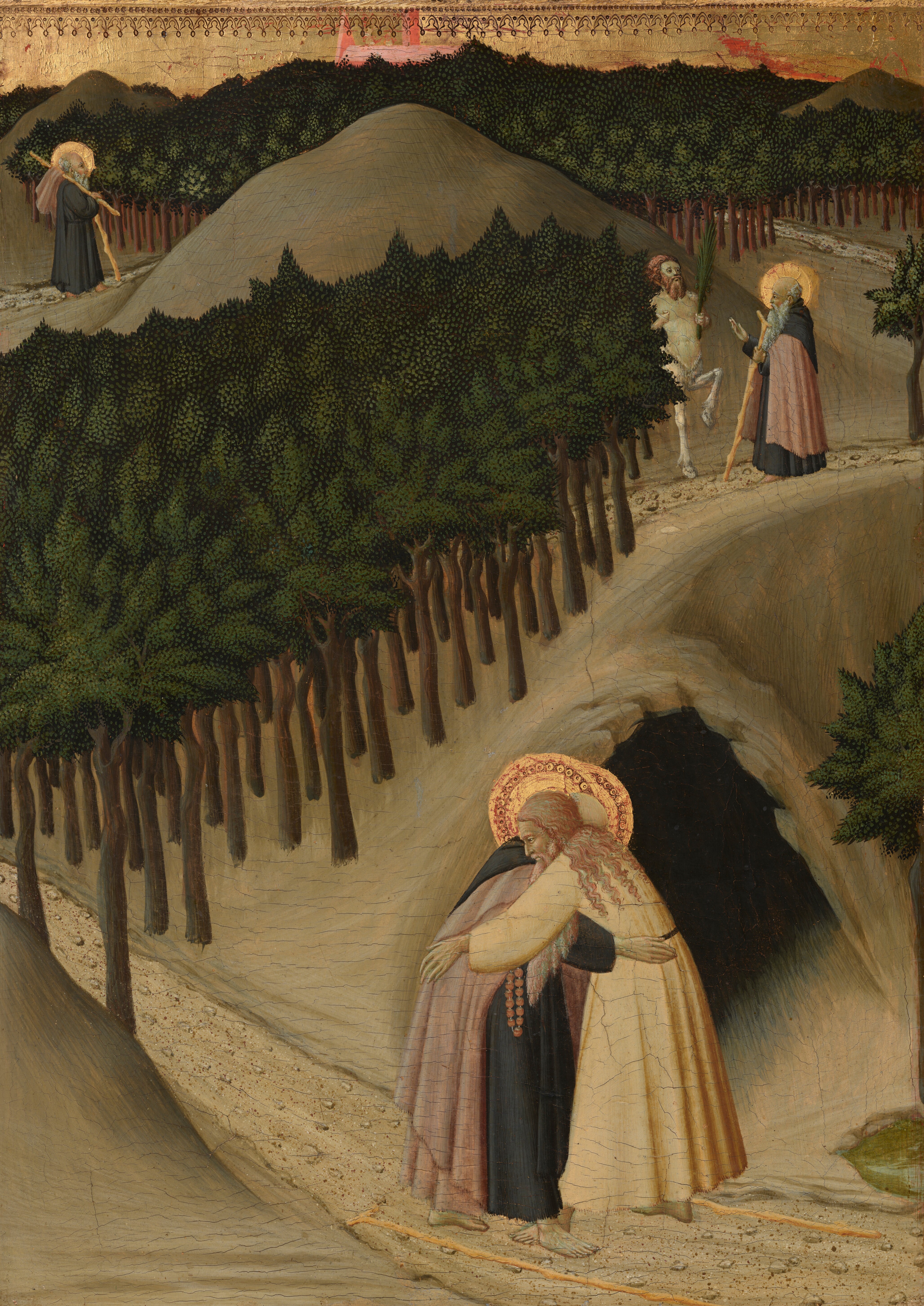
The Meeting of Saint Anthony and Saint Paul, c. 1430–1435, National Gallery of Art, US
