= Basilica dell'Osservanza =

Basilica church outside Siena, Italy

Coordinates: 43.3333°N 11.3393°E

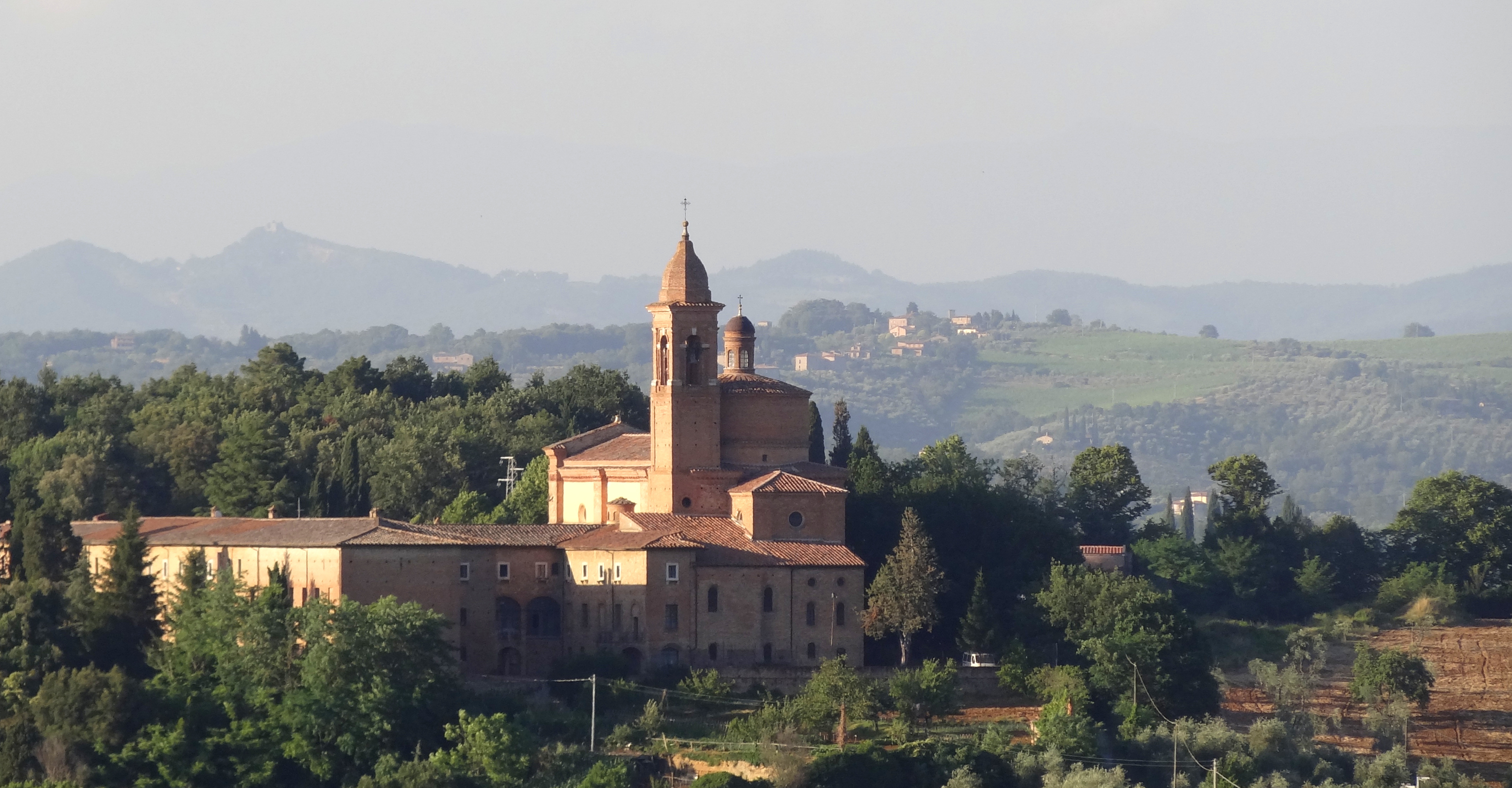
Basilica dell'Osservanza

The Basilica dell'Osservanza is a church on the outskirts of Siena, region of Tuscany, Italy.

== History ==
A hermitage is known at the site since 1192, and in 104 was donated to San Bernardino of Siena, who began construction of a church around 1420, consecrated in 1451 by the Archbishop Niccolo Piccolomini, and completed around 1490, probably designed by Francesco di Giorgio (Cecco di Giorgio). Further expansion of the church was commissioned between 1495 and 1496 by Pandolfo Petrucci.

During World War II, it was almost completely destroyed by American bombing on 23 January 1944. After the war, an ambitious reconstruction project directed by Egisto Bellini restored the basilica to its original appearance. The church was reconsecrated and reopened in 1949.

== Contents in the 19th century ==
An inventory in 1840 recalls organ doors painted by Lorenzo Feliciati. The first chapel on the right had wall frescoes by Apollonio Nasini, the second chapel, had frescoes by his uncle Tommaso. The main altar had terra-cotta statues sculpted by Gioco di Gambassi. Other sculptures by Giuseppe Mazzuoli the Younger. A crucifix painted by Riccio. Four canvases were painted by Franellini, and the pilasters had terra cotta reliefs by Della Robbia depicting an Annunciation. In the choir were paintings by Pietro di Giovanni and Ansano di Pietro.

The first chapel on the left had a painting of Santa Petronilla (1413) by Taddeo Bartoli; a Santa Filomena by Boschi, and frescoes by Franchini. Another chapel had a San Bernardino by Montorselli, with frescoes by Antonio Nasini. The third chapel had an altarpiece by Luca Della Robbia.

In the sacristy were works by Cozzarelli and the tomb of Pandolfo Petrucci. The walls had paintings by Margaritone d'Arezzo, Stefano di Giovanni, Alessandro Casolani, and Ramacciotti. An elaborate urn (1472) by Francesco d'Antonio contained the vestments of San Bernardino.

The adjacent convent's design was attributed to Peruzzi, and was said to have housed both Pius II (1459) and Pius VI (1798) during visits to Siena. The former cells of San Bernardino and San Giovanni di Capistrano were found here. The refectory had a Last Supper painted by Prete Franci.
