= Museo Diotti =

Coordinates: 44°59′23″N 10°24′53″E

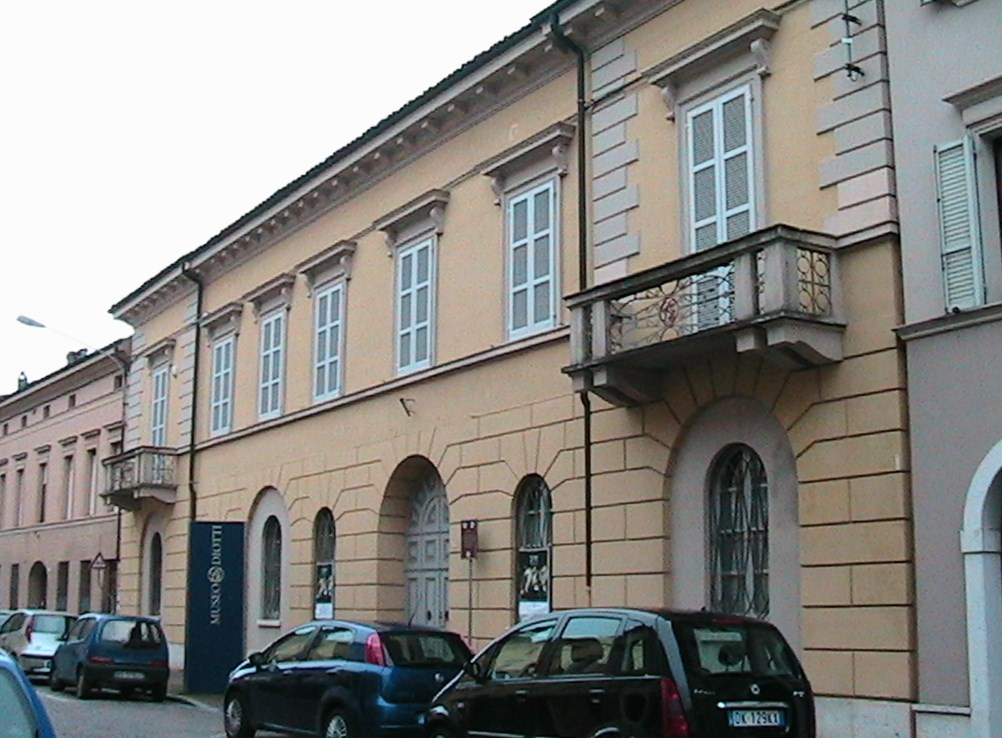
Entrance to the Museo Diotti

The Museo Diotti is an art institution and museum displaying 19th and 18th century art, located on Via Formis 17 in the historic center of Casalmaggiore, province of Cremona Lombardy, Italy.

== History ==
The museum, opened in 2007, is located in the palace once owned by the local painter Giuseppe Diotti (1779–1846). After a successful career, the painter moved back to Casalmaggiore late in life; and in 1838, he had the architect Fermo Zuccari restructure the palace. By 1865, the structure had become a local gallery, but then over the years functioned as a nursing home, school, and civic library.

The museum has one wing on the piano nobile displaying works from the 19th century, many by Diotti himself, and maintaining the rooms as they would have looked when he lived, taught, and painted there. The display includes works by Marcantonio Ghislina, Francesco Antonio Chiozzi, Paolo Araldi, Paolo Troubetzkoy, Tommaso Aroldi, Gaetano Previati, and Amedeo Bocchi. In the north side of the building are displayed works by mainly local artists of the 20th century, including Mario Beltrami, Gianfranco Manara, Tino Aroldi, and Goliardo Padova.
