= Araldi =

Araldi is a surname. Notable people with the surname include:

- Alessandro Araldi (c. 1460–c. 1529), Italian painter
- Paolo Araldi (18th-century–after 1820), Italian painter
