= Antonio Zanetti =

Italian painter (1754–1812)

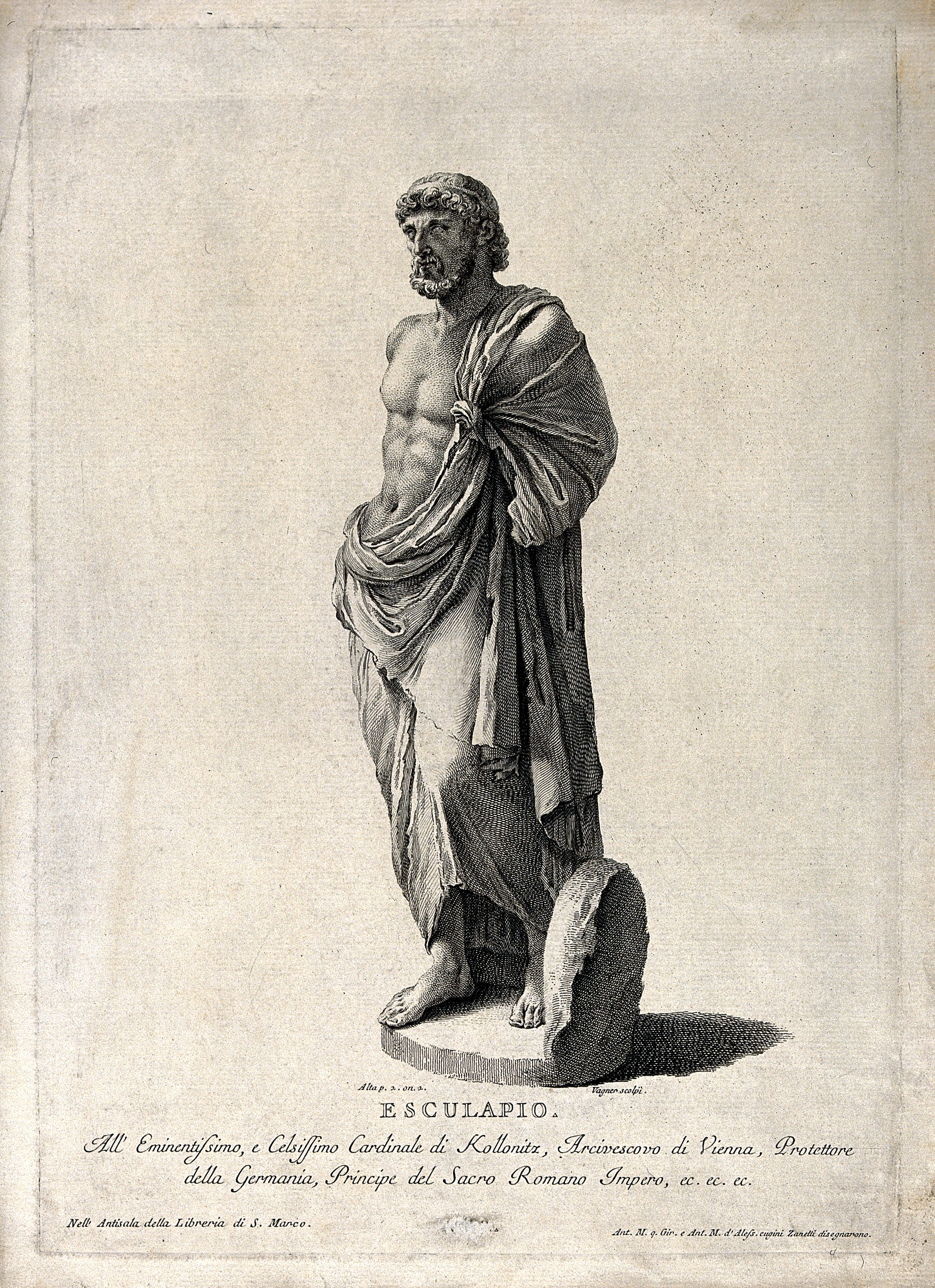
Aesculapius. Engraving by I. Wagner after Antonio Maria (Girolamo) Zanetti and Antonio Maria (Alessandro) Zanetti.

Antonio Zanetti (1754 – May 23, 1812) was an Italian painter.

He was born in Casalmaggiore, and there a pupil of the Abbot Francesco Chiozzi. Zanetti worked in the Ducal Villa at Sala, belonging to Maria Amalia, Duchess of Parma, wife of Ferdinand, Duke of Parma. He painted in the Oratory of ‘’la Cappelletta’’, in the chapel of St Joseph in Santa Croce of Casalmaggiore, and in the Casa Cavalli, and Casa Bolzoni. Zanetti also painted the entry to the library in the Convent of San Francesco. It is not clear that he is related to either Antonio Maria Zanetti the elder or the younger, the famed Venetian engraver and art historian respectively.
