= Paolo Araldi =

Italian painter

Paolo Araldi (18th century – after 1820) was an Italian painter of historical and religious subjects.

== Biography ==
He was born in Casalmaggiore, and there initially studied under the local painter Abbott Francesco Antonio Chiozzi, but later moved to study at the Academy of Fine Arts of Parma. He became a professor at the Gymnasium of Casalmaggiore. He painted a Martyrdom of St Stephen for a monastery in Casalmaggiore. In 1820 at the Brera Academy, he exhibited two larger than life portrait heads of Heraclitus and Democritus. For the church of San Leonardo in Casalmaggiore, he painted an altarpiece of San Leonardo in Glory. The painter Giuseppe Diotti was one of his pupils during 1790–1794. Museo Diotti of Casalmaggiore. It is if this Araldi was a descendant of the local Renaissance painter Alessandro Araldi.
