= Giovanni Andrea Mones =

Italian painter (1759–1803)

Giovanni Andrea Mones (1759 – March 17, 1803) was an Italian painter and architect, active mainly in Casalmaggiore and Mantua.

He was born in Casalmaggiore, Italy. He was a pupil of the Abbot Francesco Antonio Chiozzi in Casalmaggiore. He became a professor of architecture. He worked in Mantua, painting for the church of Sant'Andrea and for the Royal court, and in the Palazzo Guerrieri. He designed and decorated the Theater of Casalmaggiore. He painted a room in the Casino of Marchese Gherardini in Castelnuovo Reggiano. He also designed (1790) the Palazzo Pubblico of Casalmaggiore.
