= Giacomo Albé =

Italian painter

Giacomo Albé (July 18, 1829 – 1893) was an Italian painter, mainly of portraits.

He was born in Viadana, Province of Mantua. He studied in Rome and Bergamo under Giuseppe Diotti, and then went to work mainly in Mantua for some decades.

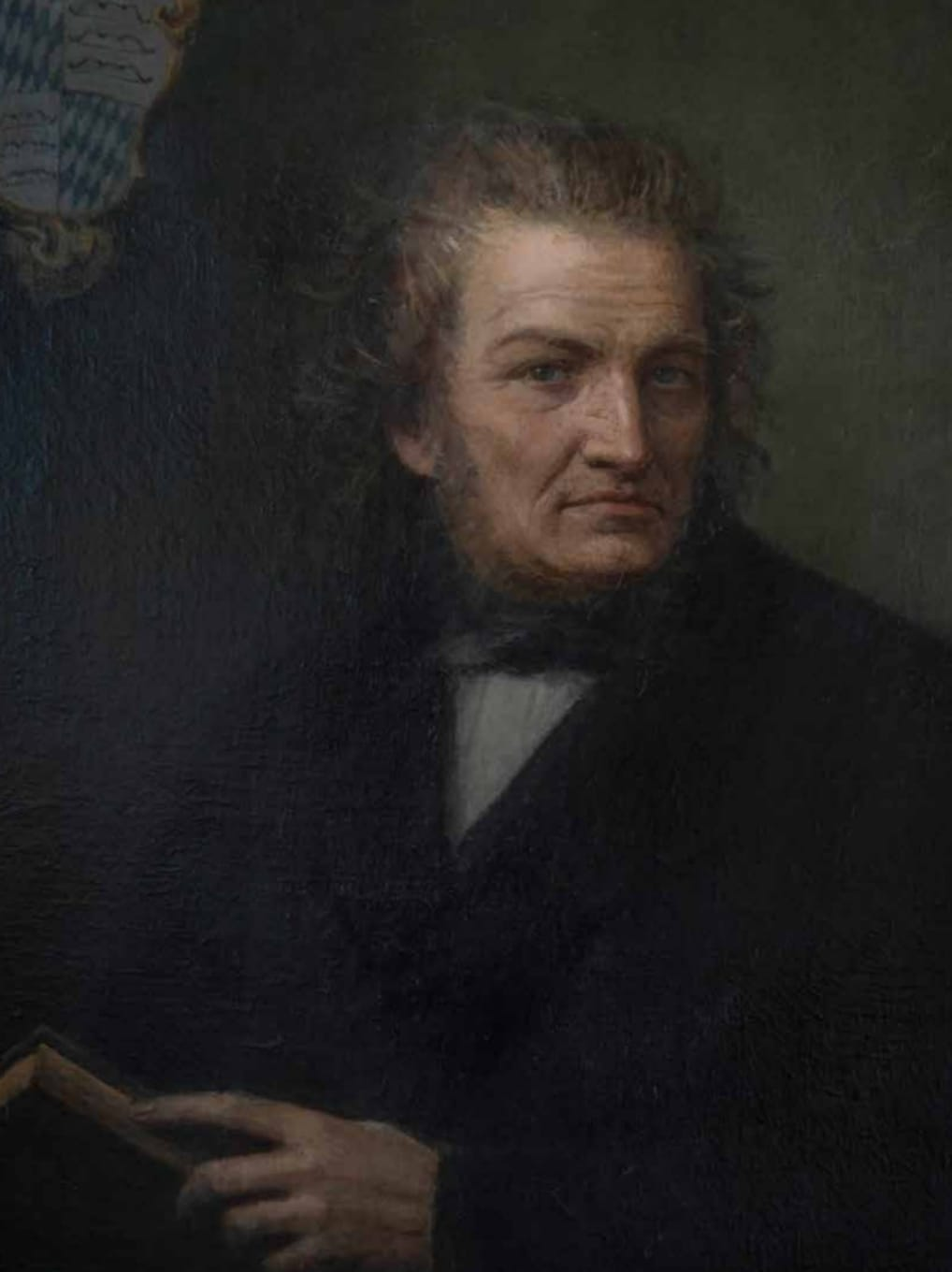
Giacomo Albé, Portrait of Luigi d'Arco

From 1850 to 1859, he painted in Havana, Cuba under the name of Joaquin. He was a resident in Milan. He painted a posthumous portrait of the Senator Arrivabene of Mantua; of signor Ottavio Rumi; and portraits of girls for signor Adolfo Naham and Count Carlo Borromeo. He painted the son of signora Sola Busca, exhibited in 1888 at Bologna, and sold to the Countess Fanny Magnaguti Revedin. He died in Milan in 1893.
