= Francesco Chiozzi =

Italian painter

Abate Francesco Antonio Chiozzi (1730 - 7 March 1785) was an Italian painter and Franciscan cleric, active mainly in Casalmaggiore, Italy.

== Biography ==
He was born in Casalmaggiore, and there was initially trained by a local priest Giuseppe Moreschi. Chiozzi then copied some works of Felice Torelli and by 1748 completed a Via Crucis for the church of San Giovanni Battista. In 1749, he completed a number of portraits for individuals in Casalmaggiore.

Hoping to gain more expertise, he was placed the following year in a studio in Bologna, soon working with Vittorio Bigari, and obtaining commissions to make copies of medallions in the possession of the Aldrovandi family. In Bologna, his Abraham expels Hagar and Ishmael won a first prize at the Clementine Academy of Fine Arts for figure. The following year for the Marsigliani prizes, he won second place for his Hercules slays the Dragon at the Golden Gate.

In 1753, he completed a Burial of St Stephen for a local church that had been started by Favagrossa. He made a copy of the Madonnina del Buon Consiglio, originally by Pellegrino Tibaldi. In 1754, he painted a St Peter and St Paul for a bishop in Sabbioneta. He painted fresco medallions for a church in Rivarolo. (Note: Presumably either Rivarolo del Re ed Uniti (which borders Casalmaggiore) or Rivarolo Mantovano (which borders Rivarolo del Re ed Uniti).) He also painted frescoes for the Convent of the Servites della Fontana in Casalmaggiore. In 1755 he entered the Franciscan order, but did not stop painting. In 1755 he painted a portrait of Maria Amalia, Duchess of Parma, to celebrate the naming of Chiozzi's native town as a city.

He traveled to Rome from 1759-1767, where he had a number of commissions from English patrons, mainly copies of major works and portraits.

Returning to Casalmaggiore he painted a Saints Roch, Eurosia, and the Assumption of the Madonna for the church in the frazione of Vicobellignano. Lateral to this main altarpiece, he painted two other depicting the Sacrifice of Abraham and the Apparition of the Angel. He also painted a St Louis Gonzaga for the church of Breda Cisoni in Sabbioneta. He also painted altarpieces of Sant’Anna and a Crucifixion.

He painted for the Oratory of San Sebastiano, the parish church of the frazione of Vicomoscano, the parish church of Cicognara in Viadana, and the hospital of Casalmaggiore. He painted a transitory triumphal arch celebrating the visit of the Archduchess in 1770. In 1774-1775, he traveled for some time to Mantua to complete both sacred subjects and portraits.

With the patronage of Count Raimondo Magnoni, he set up a studio and among his pupils were Giovanni Andrea Mones, Antonio Zanetti, Francesco Ferrari, Giovanni Battista Pellizzari, Giacopo Mosca, Pietro Guazzi, and Paolo Araldi.

His brother Angelo Fortunato was also a cleric, and a respected canon lawyer.
