= Aldrovandi =

Aldrovandi is a family name of the Emilia-Romagna in Italy, and especially famous for the aristocratic and Senatorial family from Bologna. The Palazzo Aldrovandi in central Bologna was built by the family. Among its famous members are:

- Cardinal Pompeo Aldrovandi (1668–1752), Italian Cardinal of the Roman Catholic Church
- Ulisse Aldrovandi (1522–1605), an Italian botanist and naturalist, after which the genus Aldrovanda is named
- Luigi Aldrovandi Marescotti, Count of Viano (1876–1945) Italian politician and diplomat

== Other ==
- Aldrovandi Villa Borghese- a hotel in Rome
