= Mario Beltrami =

Italian painter

- Born: 2 May 1902; Casalmaggiore, Italy
- Died: 7 September 1987 (aged 85); Motteggiana, Italy
- Occupation: Painter

Mario Beltrami (2 May 1902 – 7 September 1987) was an Italian painter. His work was part of the painting event in the art competition at the 1932 Summer Olympics.
