= Marco Antonio Ghislina =

Italian painter

Marco Antonio Ghislina (1676–1756) was an Italian painter, active mainly in Casalmaggiore and Cremona, painting sacred subjects in a Baroque-style.

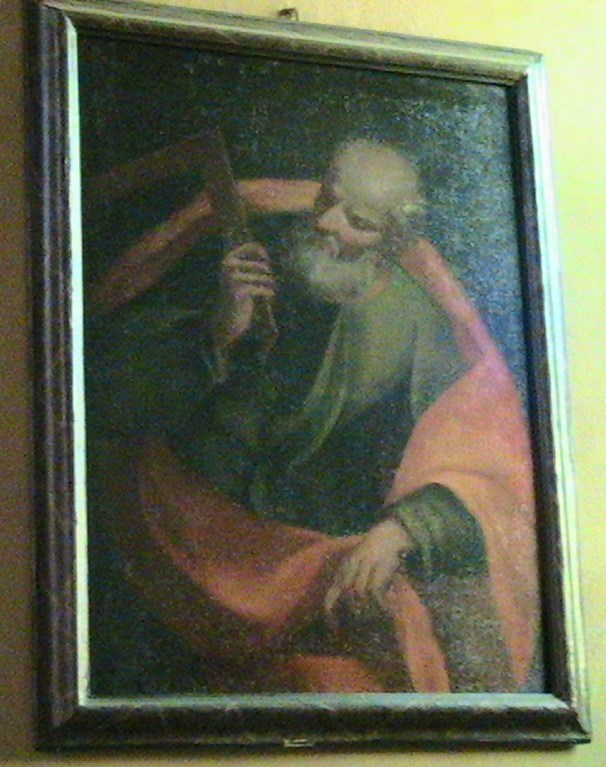
St Joseph in parish church of Santa Maria Annunciata, Rivarolo Mantovano

He was born in Casalmaggiore, Italy. From a young age was inclined to painting. He moved to Cremona at a young age, and was active for many years there. It is not known who was his master there. He painted in the church of the Santissima Annunciata (Chiesa dell'ex Ospedale) in Casalmaggiore. He was aided in his work by his wife and daughter.

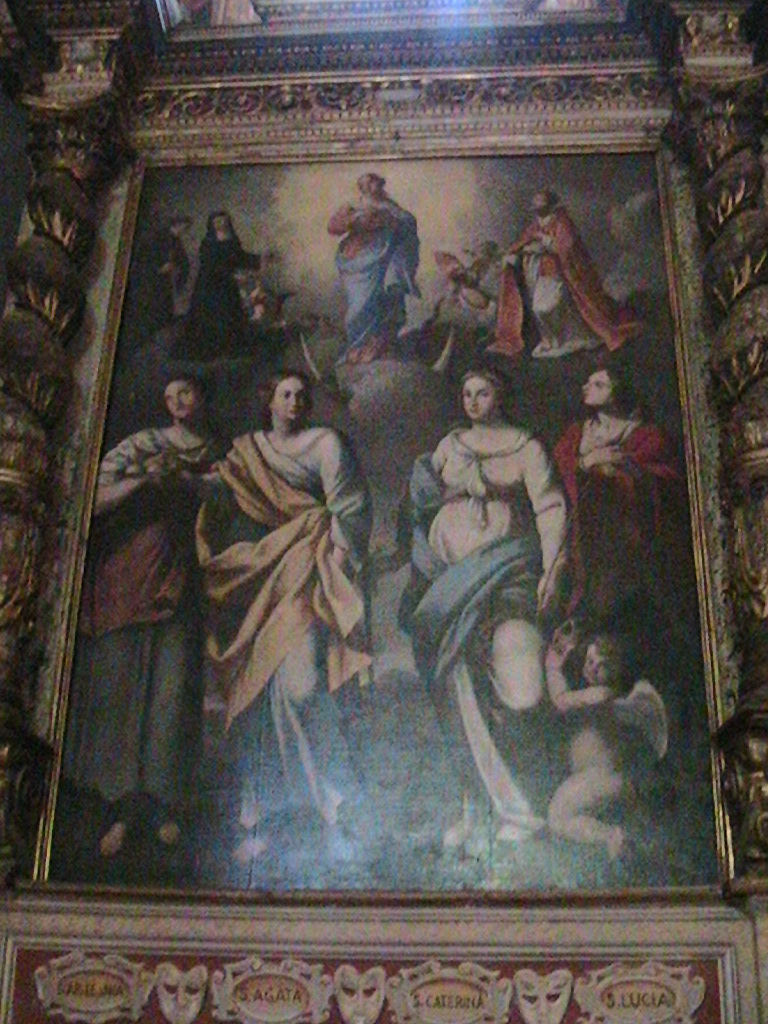
Four Virgins, parish church of San Pietro Apostolo, Bozzolo
