= Giuseppe Diotti =

Italian painter (1779–1846)

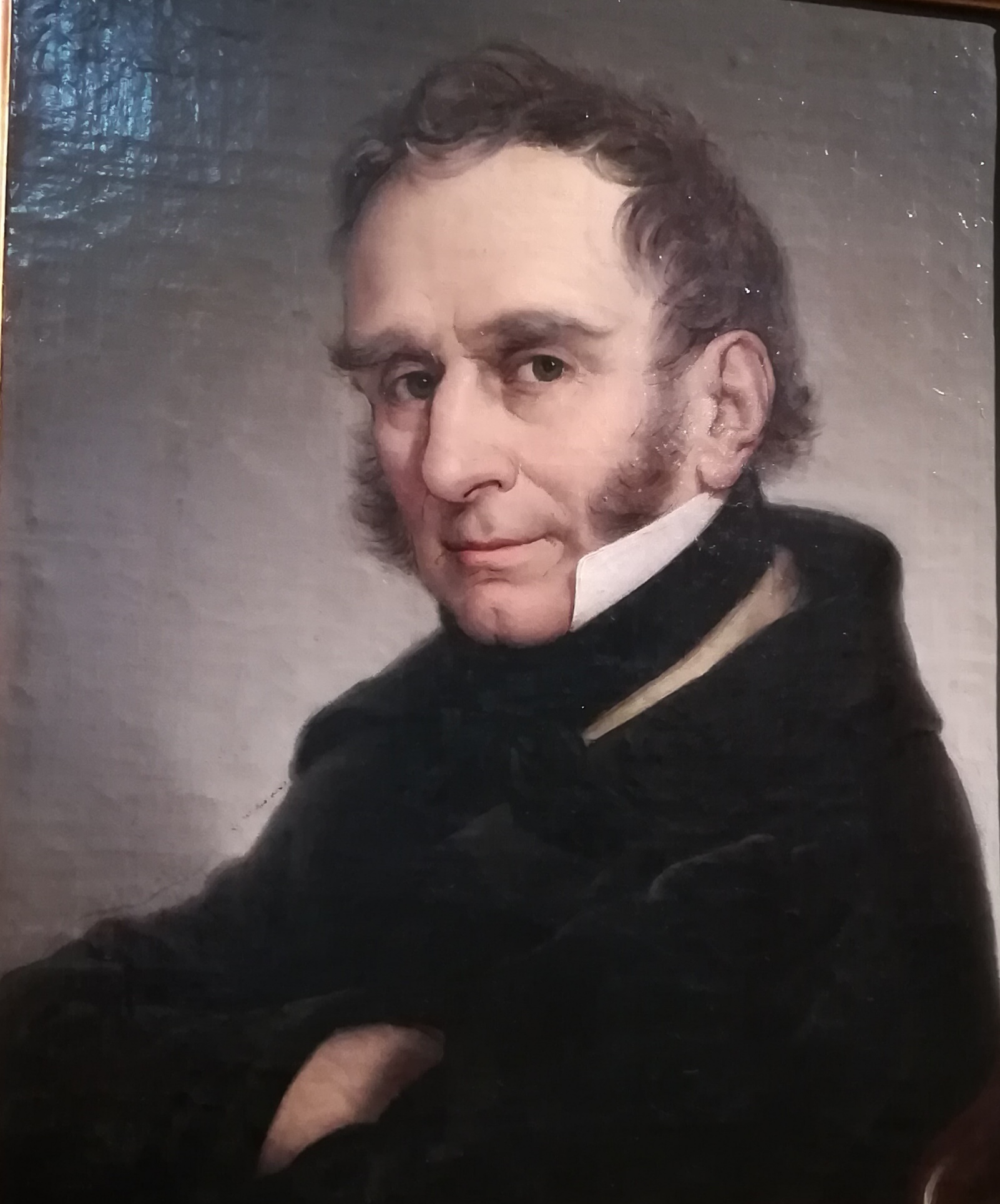
- Self-portrait (1844)
- Born: 1 March 1779; Casalmaggiore, Duchy of Parma
- Died: 30 January 1846 (aged 66); Casalmaggiore, Duchy of Parma
- Known for: Painting
- Movement: Neoclassicism; Romanticism

Francesco Giuseppe Antonio Diotti (1 March 1779 – 30 January 1846) was an Italian painter of the Neoclassic style. He was strongly influenced by the academic styles of both Gaspare Landi and Vincenzo Camuccini. He painted in fresco as well as in oil, distinguishing himself as a painter of historical subjects.

== Biography ==
=== Early life and education ===
Francesco Giuseppe Antonio Diotti was born in Casalmaggiore on 1 March 1779. He initially was apprenticed in his hometown to Paolo Araldi. As a teenager, until 1796, he studied at the Academy of Fine Arts of Parma under the history painter Gaetano Callani. Despite initial support from the financier Gian Vincenzo Ponzoni, by the late 1790s he was having to earn money through small decorating jobs and sign-painting. However, Diotti had learnt from the luminosity and sense of colour of Emilian fresco painting as practised by Andrea Appiani, who became his friend and supporter after 1800 when Diotti arrived in Milan. In 1804 he won a four-year scholarship to Rome with Hercules Stabbing Nessus. Here he studied under Vincenzo Camuccini, who had recently completed his Poussinesque frescoes at the Villa Borghese.

Diotti continued to send works back to Milan for exhibition, achieving enough success to ensure a steady flow of minor ecclesiastical and secular commissions after his return to Lombardy in 1810. The most representative of his religious paintings are the four frescoes in Cremona Cathedral, the Ascension, Incredulity of Thomas, Christ Blessing the Little Children and Christ Giving the Keys to St. Peter ( 1830–34). The stilted compositions are enlivened by a cheerful use of colour, characteristic of his oil paintings.

=== Career ===
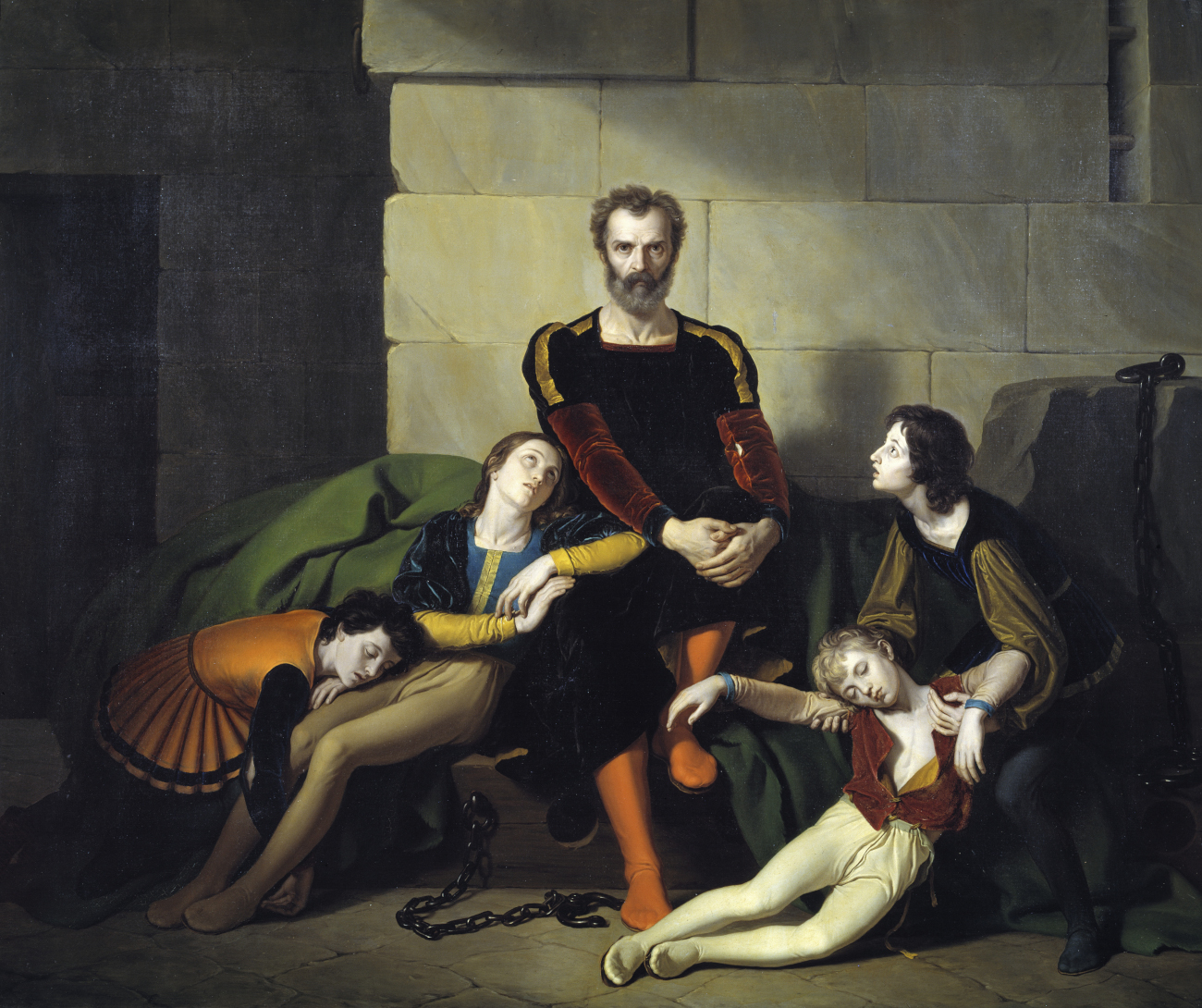
Ugolino with his sons, Museo di Santa Giulia, Brescia

In 1811, probably due to Appiani’s advocacy, Diotti was appointed director of the Accademia Carrara at Bergamo. He received many subsequent honors including membership in the Academies of Milan (Brera) in 1815, the Atheneum at Bergamo in 1819, the Atheneum at Brescia in 1829, the Accademia of Bologna in 1837, and the Roman Accademia di San Luca in 1844.

Diotti's teaching commitments, which continued until 1844, did not impede the prolific production of religious, mythological and history paintings and also portraits. Count Ugolino (1832; Brescia, Pinacoteca Tosio Martinengo) was considered by contemporaries to be his masterpiece. The betrayed Count is shown in prison surrounded by his grandsons; the models were all Diotti’s pupils. While the composition is strictly academic, with the figures grouped in a neat pyramid, the painting’s exaggerated pathos is entirely Romantic.

Pontida’s Conspiracy (1837; Milan, Galleria d'Arte Moderna), commissioned by Luigi Chiozzi, an admirer of patriotic and historical subjects, was equally well received. The figures to the right of the picture recall, in a simplistic fashion, David’s Oath of the Horatii (1784; Paris, Louvre).

Diotti helped decorate, alongside Luigi Sabatelli, the frescoes (1818) at Palazzo Bolzesi in Cremona; the Bath of Venus at Palazzo Locatelli in Bergamo; and four frescoes in the Colleoni chapel in the Cathedral of Cremona. He died in 1846 in Casalmaggiore, aged 66. His former palace and studio is now the Museo Diotti. Among his pupils were Giovanni Carnovali and Enrico Scuri. He was a mentor and collaborator with Pietro Ronzoni.

=== Legacy ===
Although Diotti was an adherent of the Neoclassical theories of Johann Joachim Winckelmann and Anton Raphael Mengs, his paintings have a strong Romantic streak that stretches conventional Lombard Neoclassical painting to its limits.

== Selected paintings ==
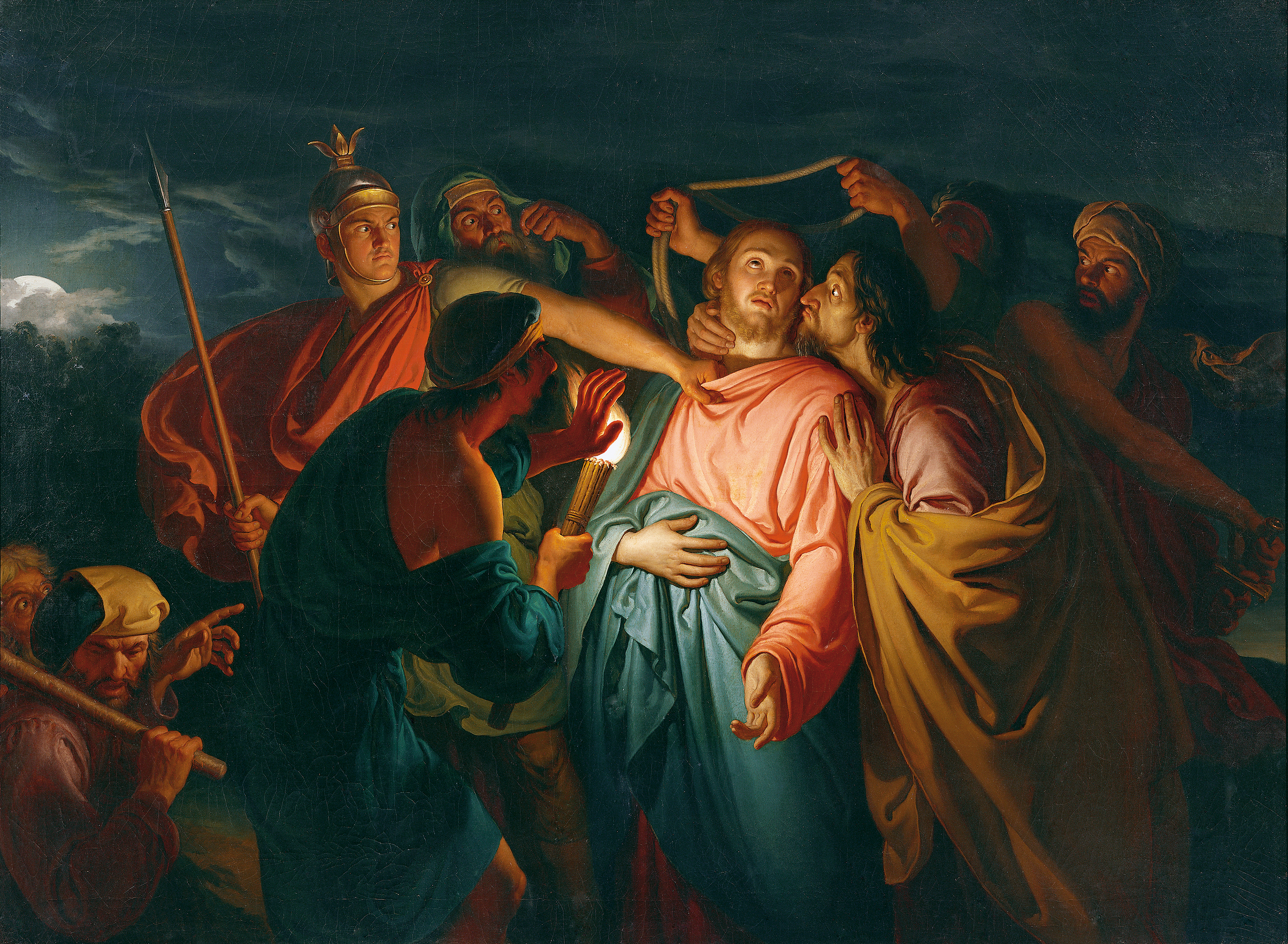
Kiss of Judas, oil on canvas (1840), Österreichische Galerie Belvedere, Vienna

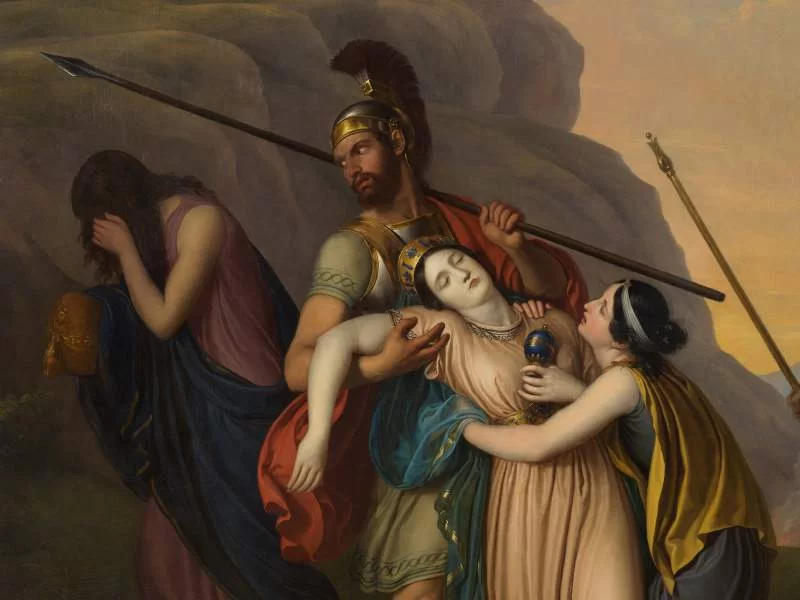
Antigone Condemned to Death by Creon (Detail), oil on canvas (1845)

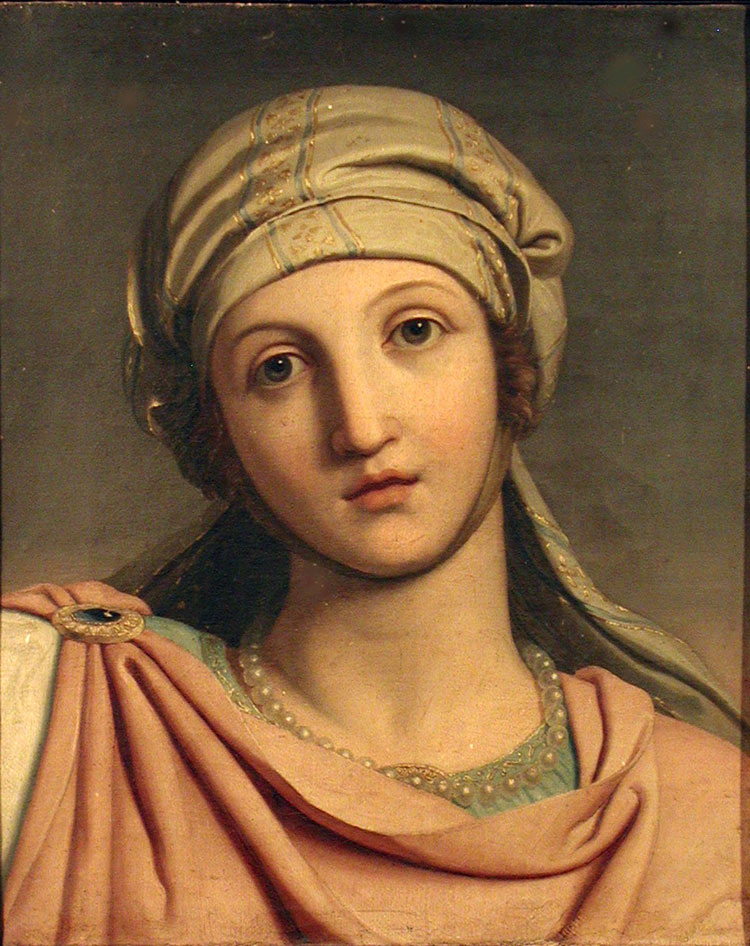
Rebecca, oil on canvas (1823)

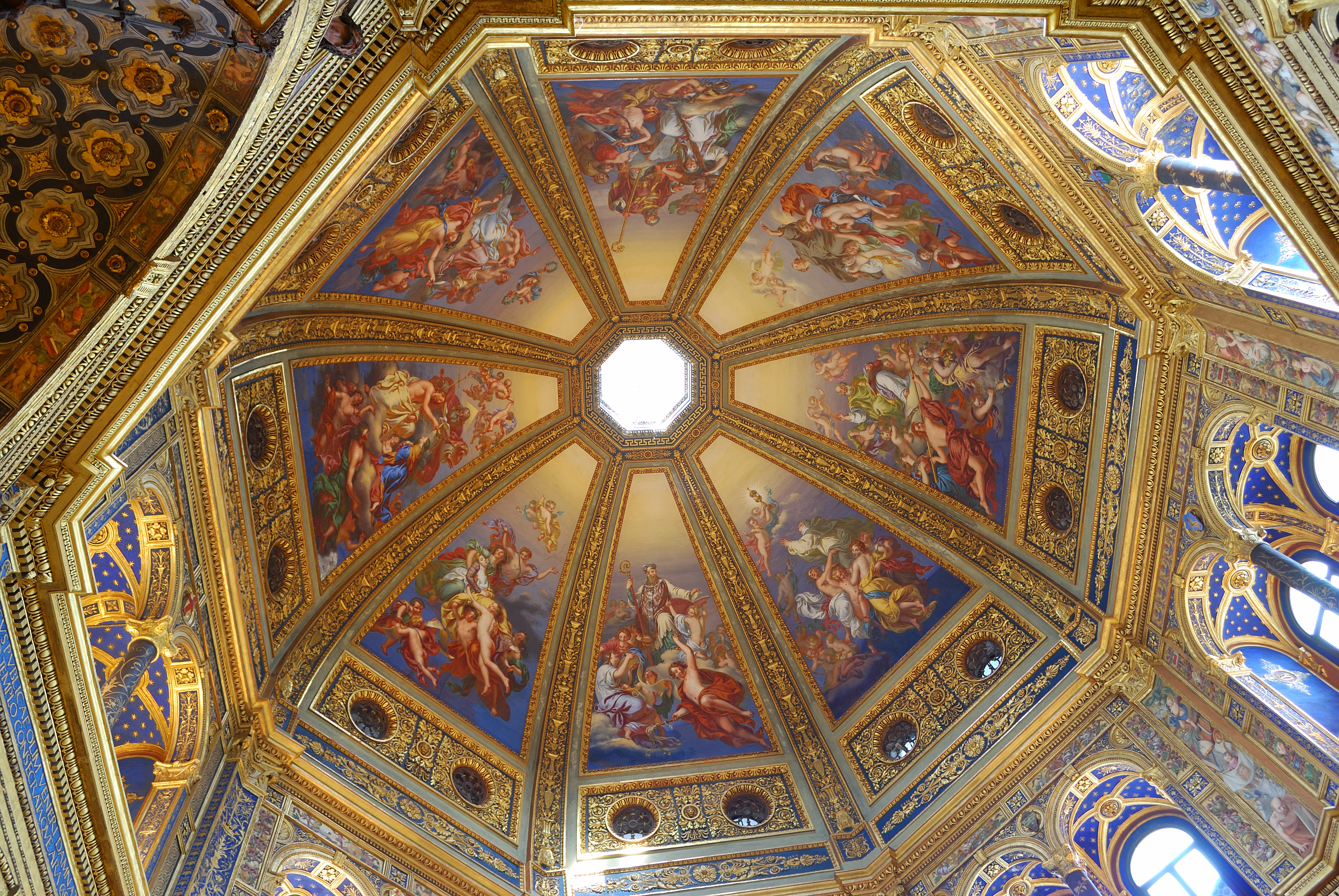
Dome frescoes at the Tempio Civico della Beata Vergine Incoronata

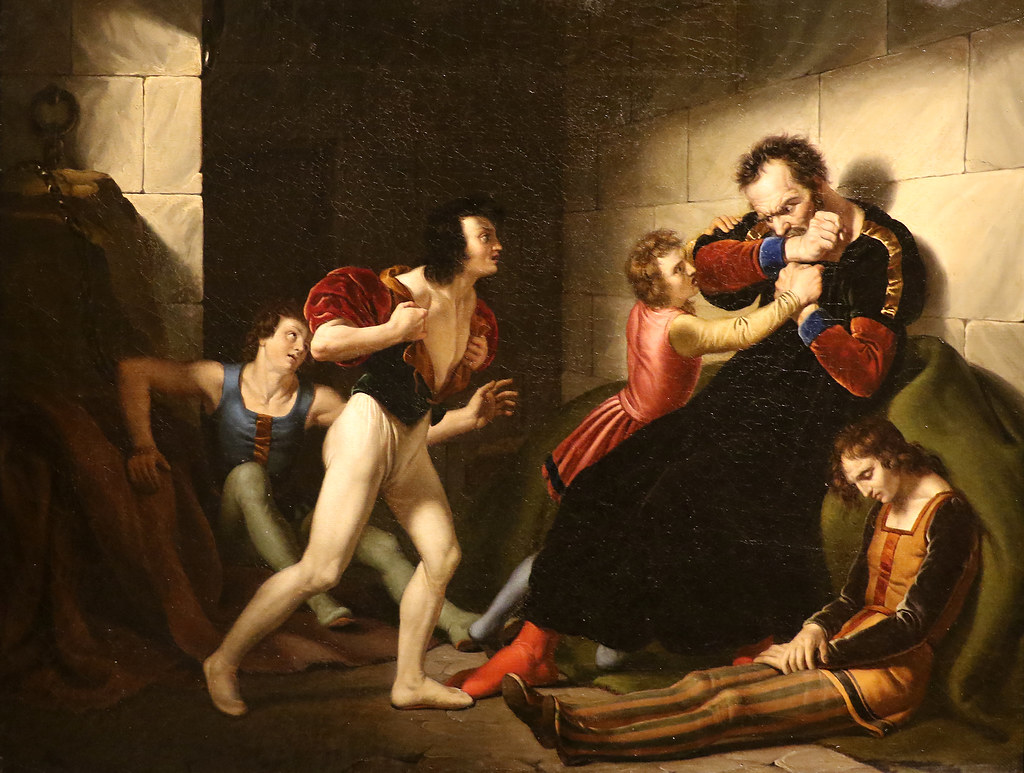
Ugolino with his sons in prison, oil on canvas (c. 1836)

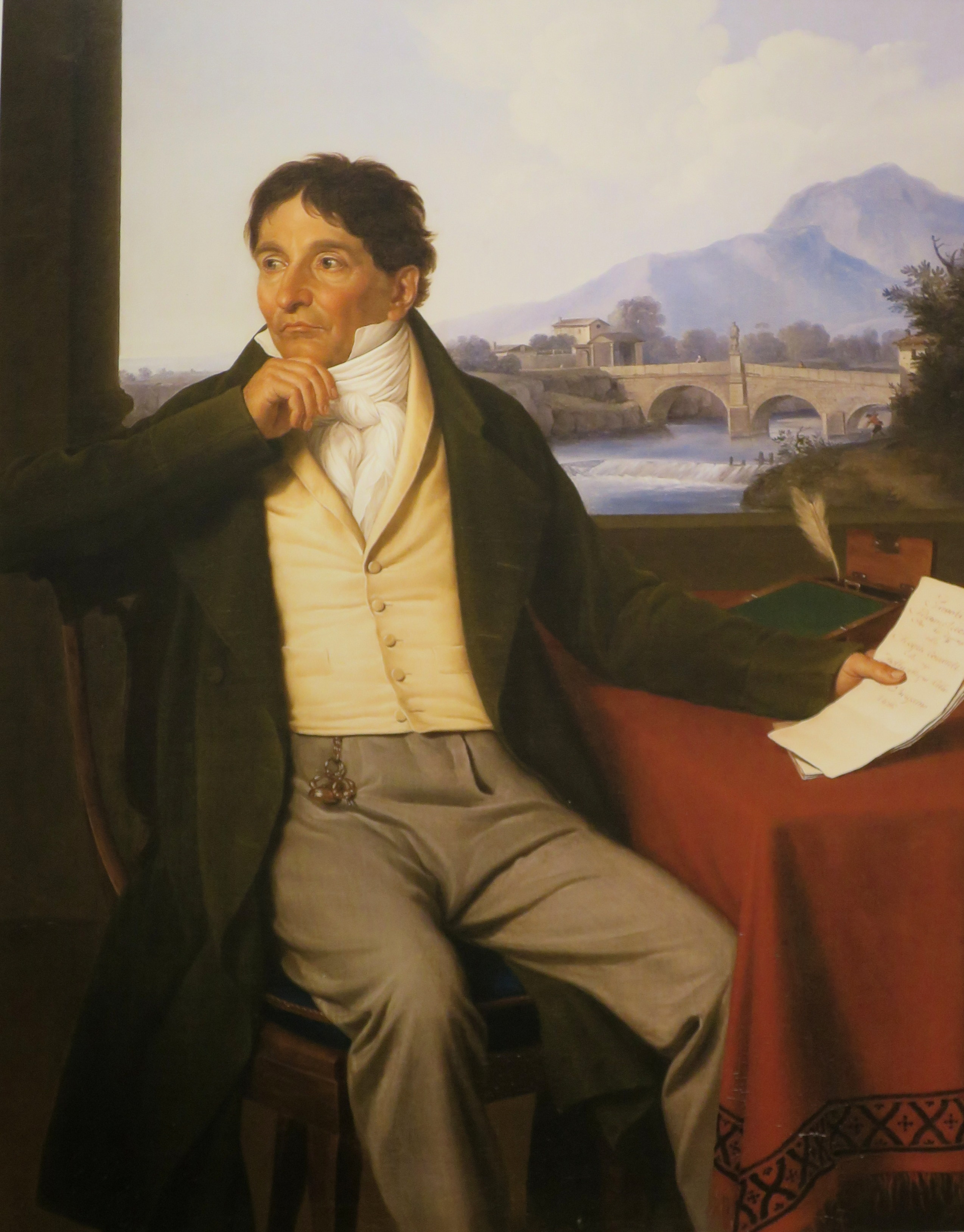
Portrait of Antonio Tadini, oil on canvas
