= Aldrovandi Villa Borghese =

5-star hotel

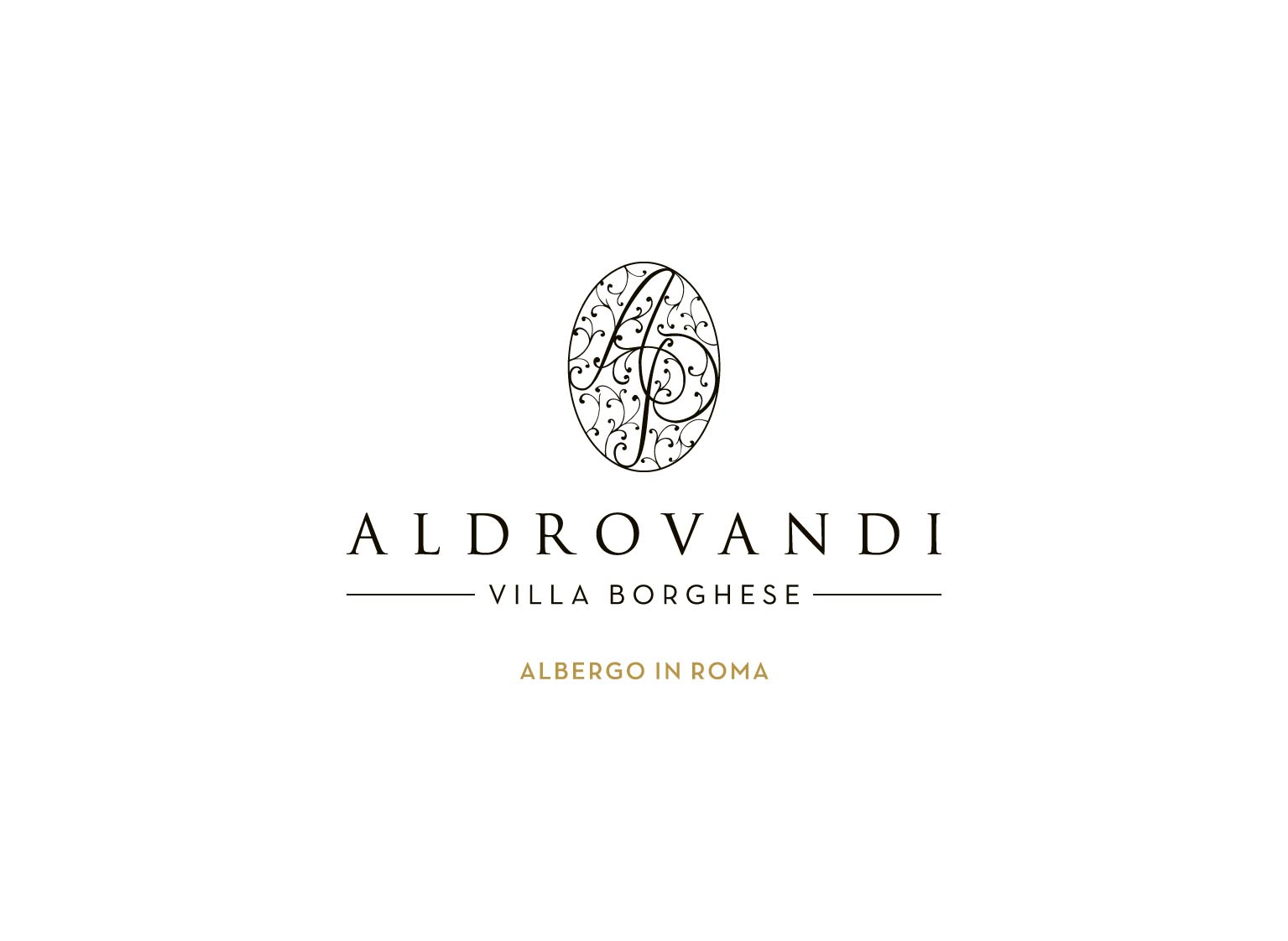

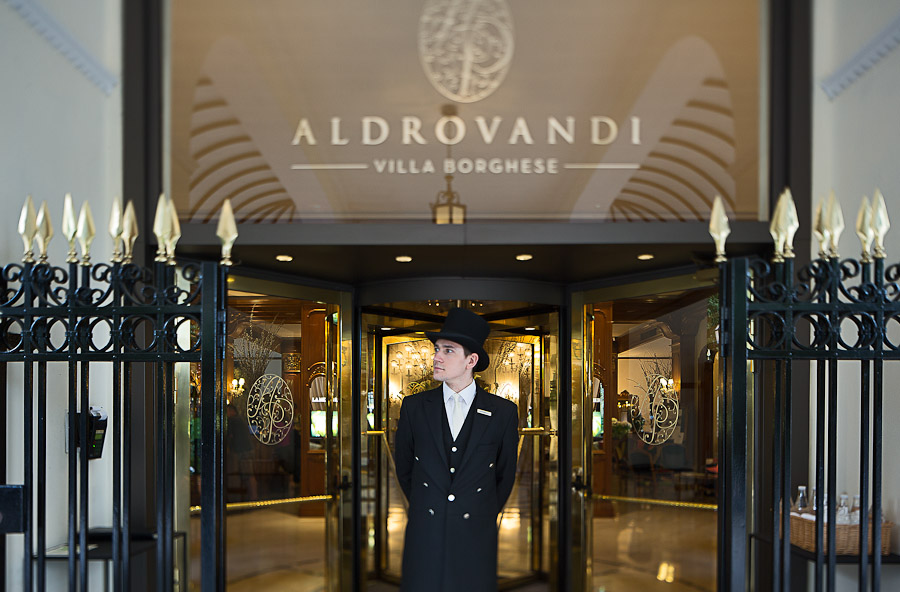
- Aldrovandi Villa Borghese main entrance

- Location within Rome

General information
- Location: Via Ulisse Aldrovandi 15, Rome, Italy
- Coordinates: 41°55′08″N 12°29′05″E
- Opening: 1981
- Affiliation: The Leading Hotels of the World

Other information
- Number of rooms: 92
- Number of suites: 16
- Number of restaurants: 2

Website
- Official website

Aldrovandi Villa Borghese is a luxury 5-star hotel at the edge of Villa Borghese in Rome, Italy.

A member of The Leading Hotels of the World. It is also adjacent to Bioparco, a zoological garden located on part of the original Villa Borghese estate.

== History ==
Prior to becoming a hotel, this late 19th century Umbertine palace hosted the Istituto Cabrini, a prestigious young ladies' college operated by the Sœurs missionnaires du Sacré-Cœur, and attended by pupils mainly from the aristocracy.

The hotel name is a combination of the street name Via Ulisse Aldrovandi - in honour of the Italian naturalist Ulisse Aldrovandi - and the name of the adjacent Villa Borghese gardens.

Aldrovandi Villa Borghese is a family-owned property. Before becoming general manager of the hotel, Ugo Ossani was director of sales and marketing and its executive director.

== Features ==
The hotel has 92 rooms and 16 suites, two restaurants, two bars, an outdoor swimming pool, private gardens, nine meeting rooms and banqueting facilities. In 2011, the Michelin Guide awarded two Michelin stars to its restaurant Oliver Glowig. In 2014, Aldrovandi Villa Borghese opened a brand new spa in collaboration with the high-end cosmetics brand La Mer.

== Gallery ==
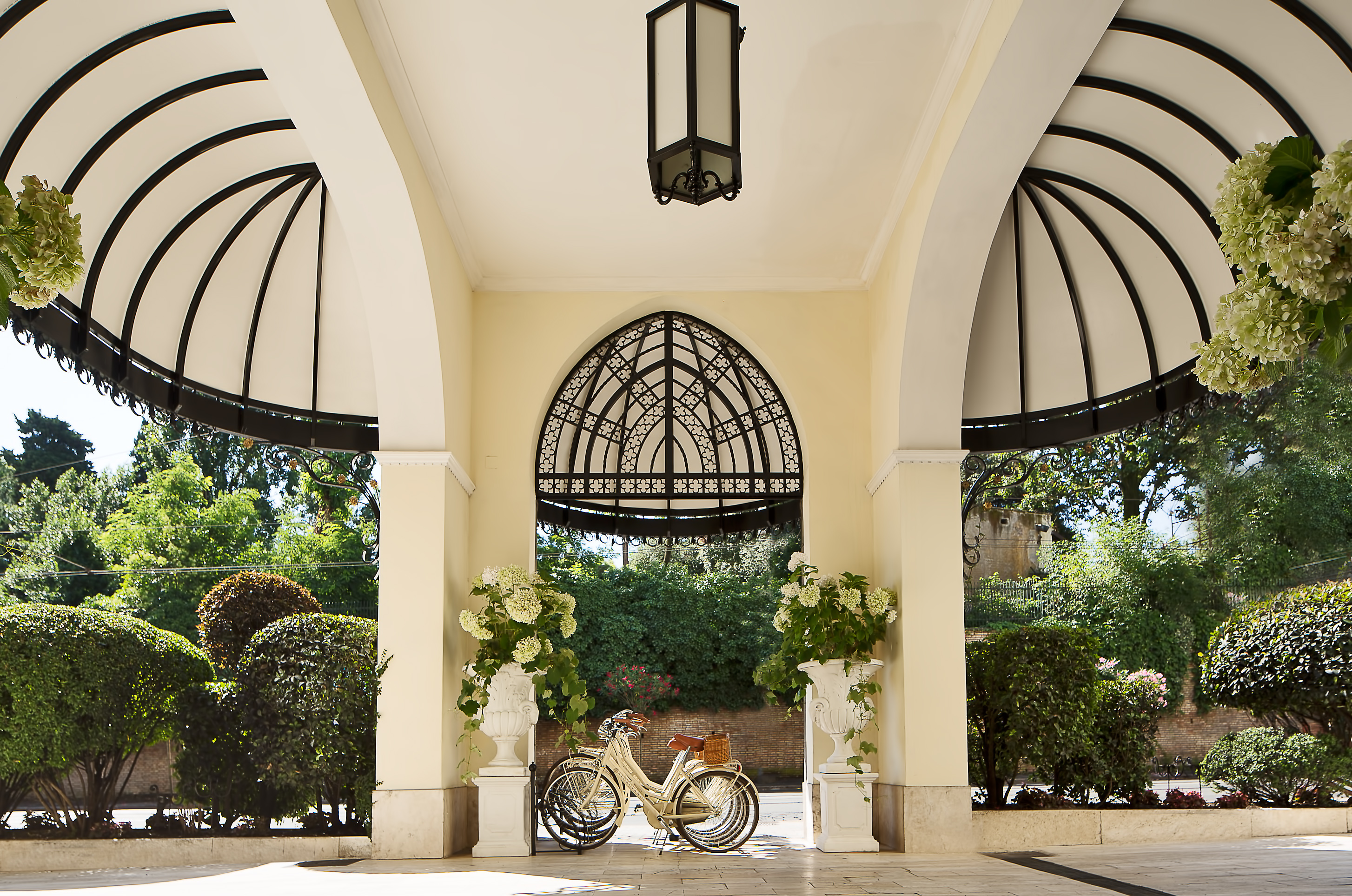
Aldrovandi bicycles

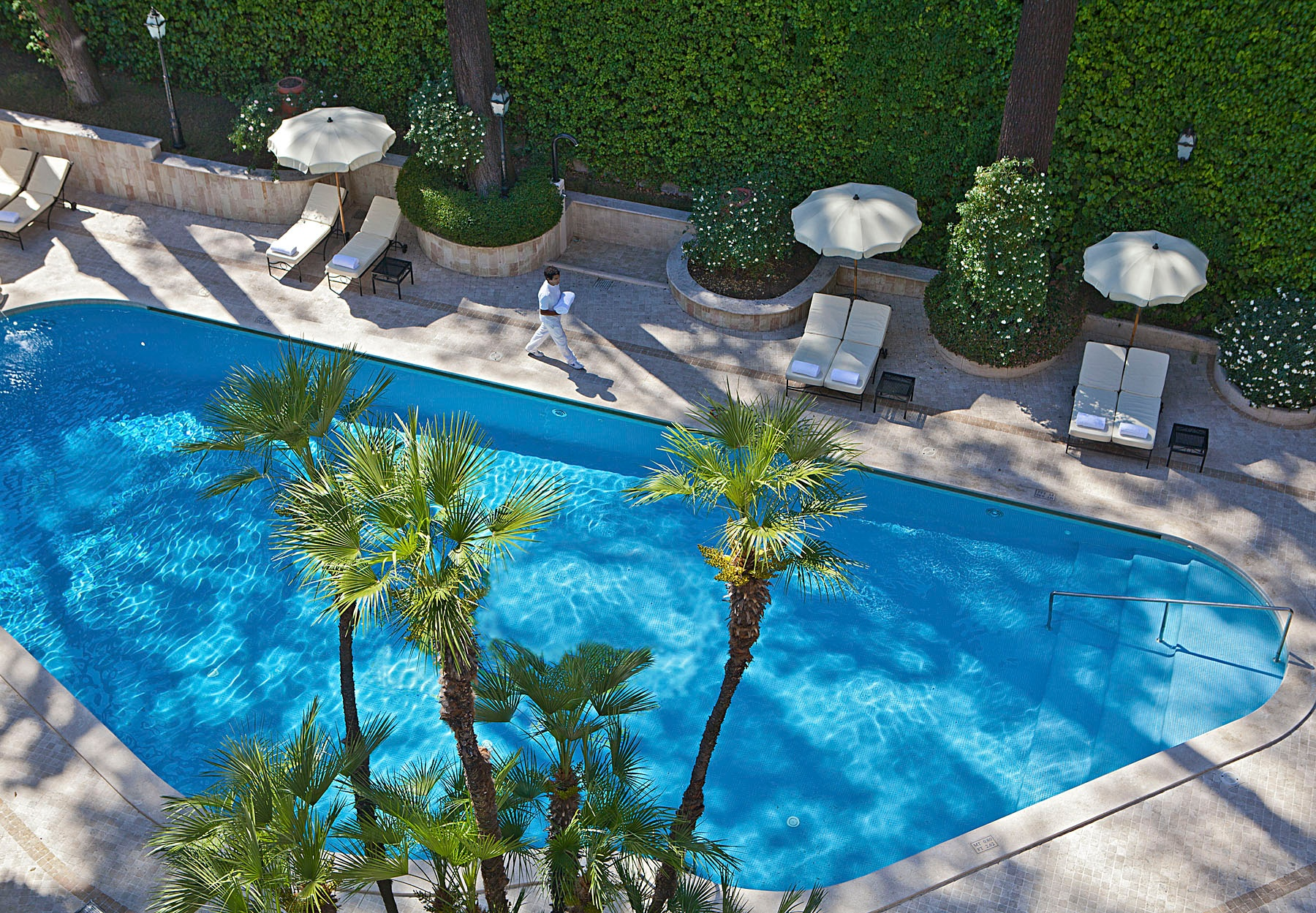
Aldrovandi swimming pool

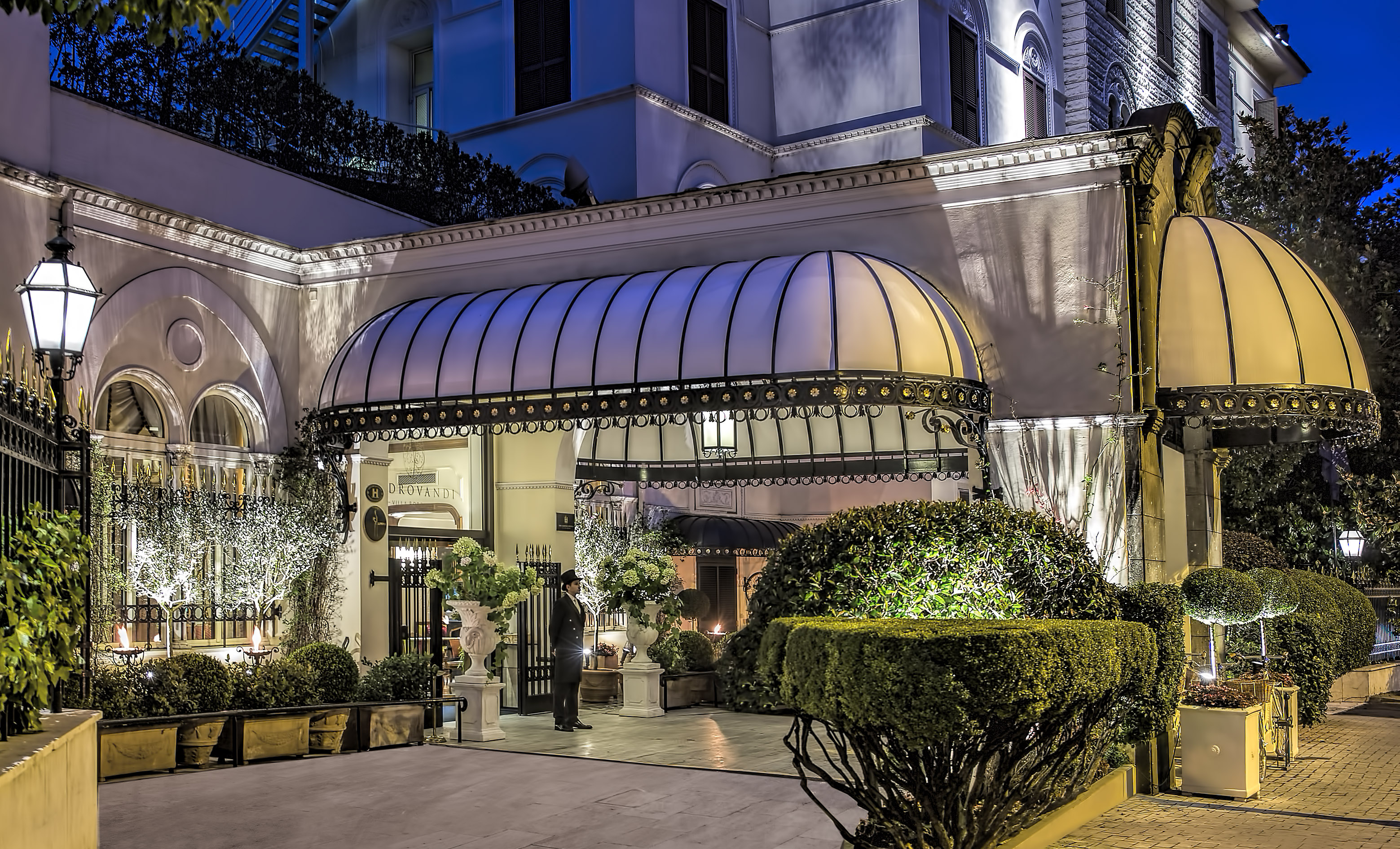
Front Entrance

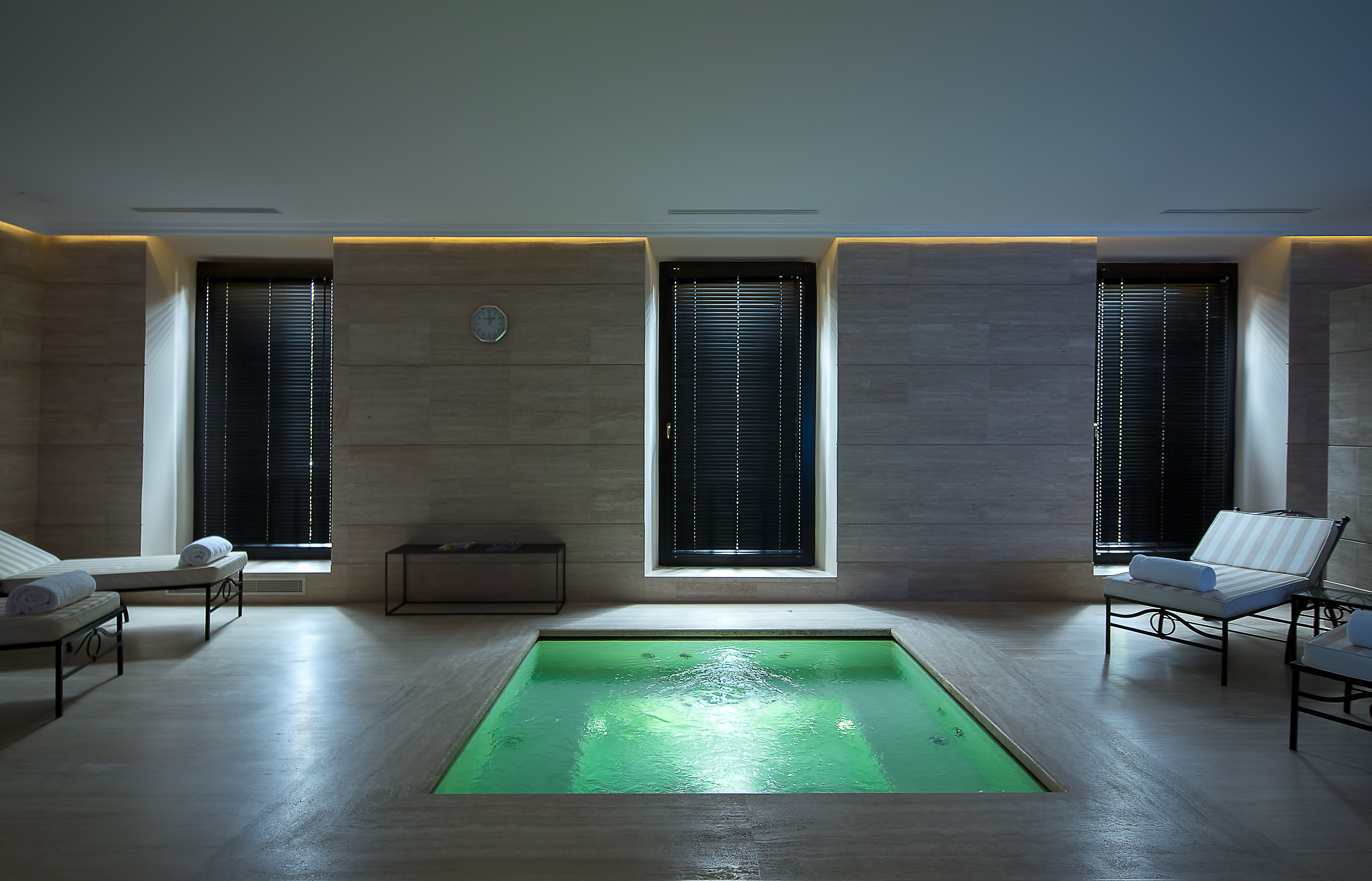
Spa
