= Alessandro Araldi =

Italian painter

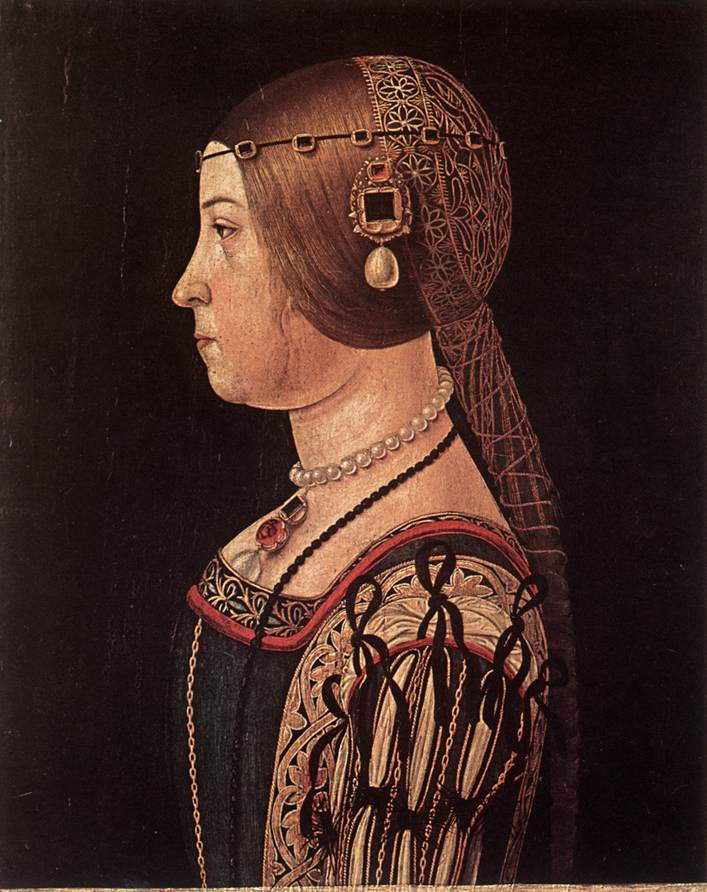
Portrait of Barbara Pallavicino (c. 1510) from Uffizi Gallery

Alessandro Araldi (c. 1460 – c. 1529) was an Italian painter of the Renaissance, active mainly in Parma.

Little is known of his biography. He apparently assisted with contemporary Cristoforo Caselli (il Temperello). His work shows the influences of the school of Melozzo da Forlì and of early Venetian Renaissance painters such as Giovanni Bellini and the Vivarini, but also Lorenzo Costa from Ferrara. He painted frescoes in the Benedictine monastery of San Paolo. He also painted two scenes with the story of St. Catherine, the Dispute before the emperor Maximilian and St. Catherine and St. Jerome, including an odd Annunciation (1514), for the abbess Giovanna da Piacenza (1514). Antonio Allegri (Correggio) would complete his own masterpiece frescoes for the abbess in a strikingly different, and for the age, more modern style.

== Gallery ==
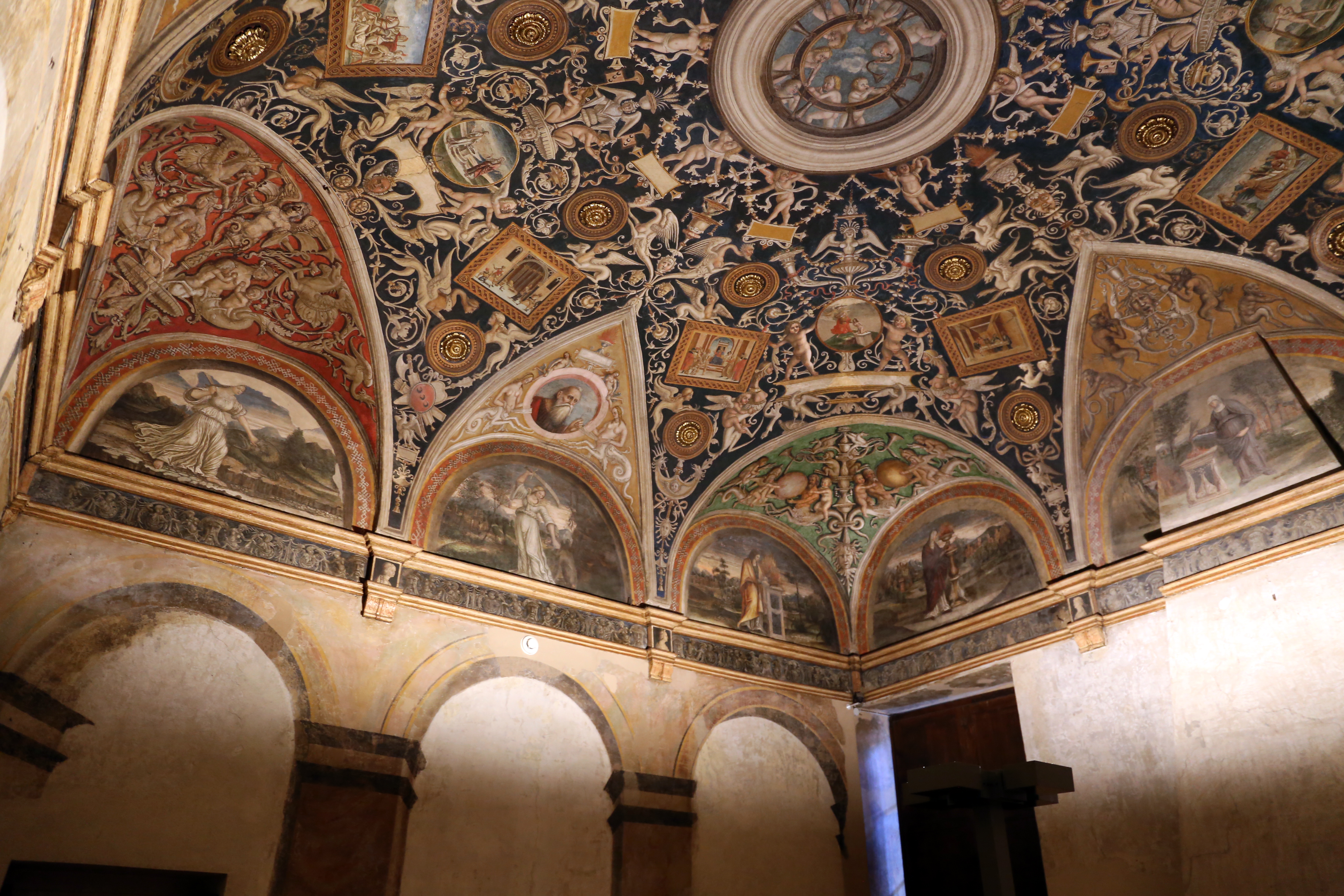
Vault with Biblical scenes (1514)

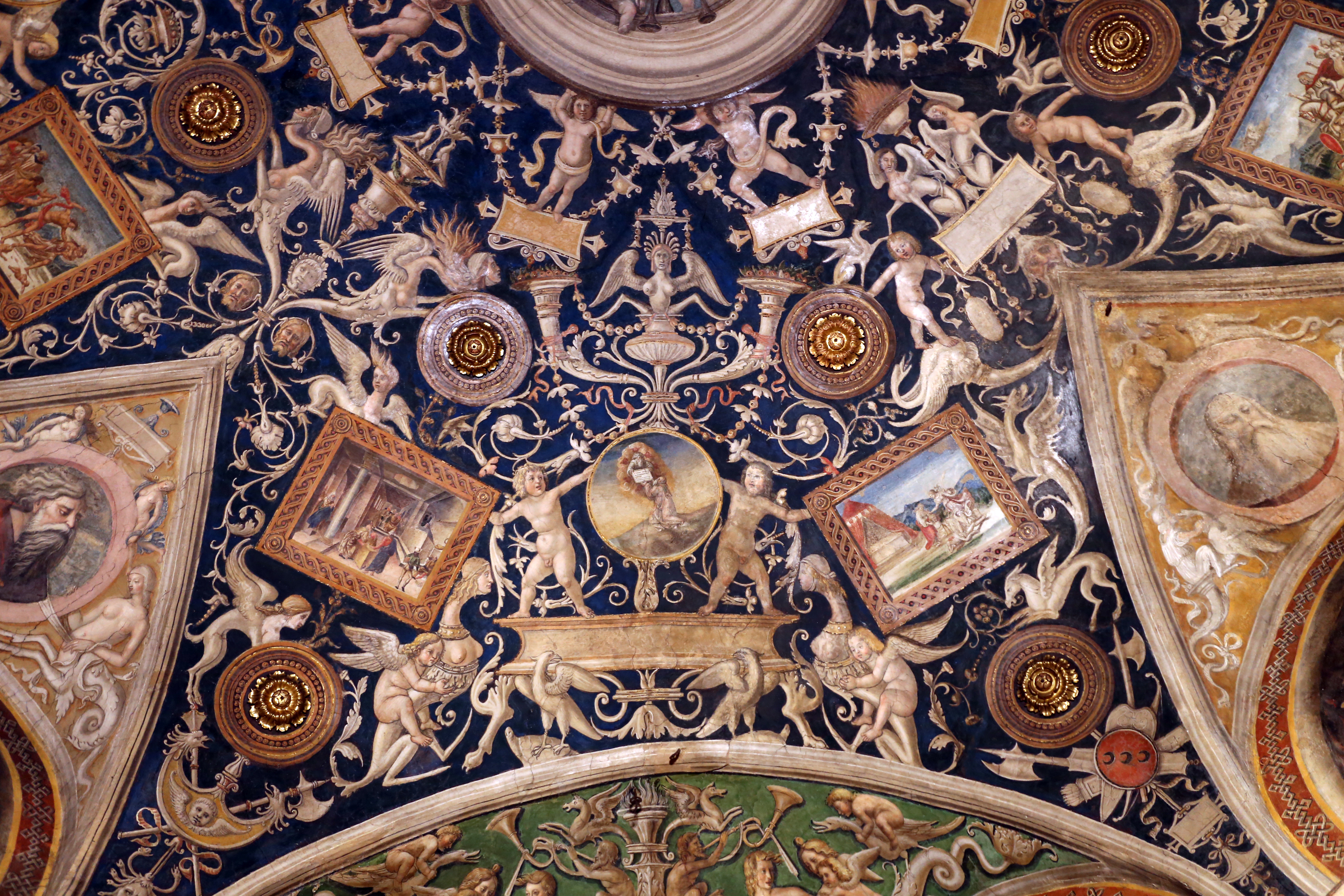
Vault

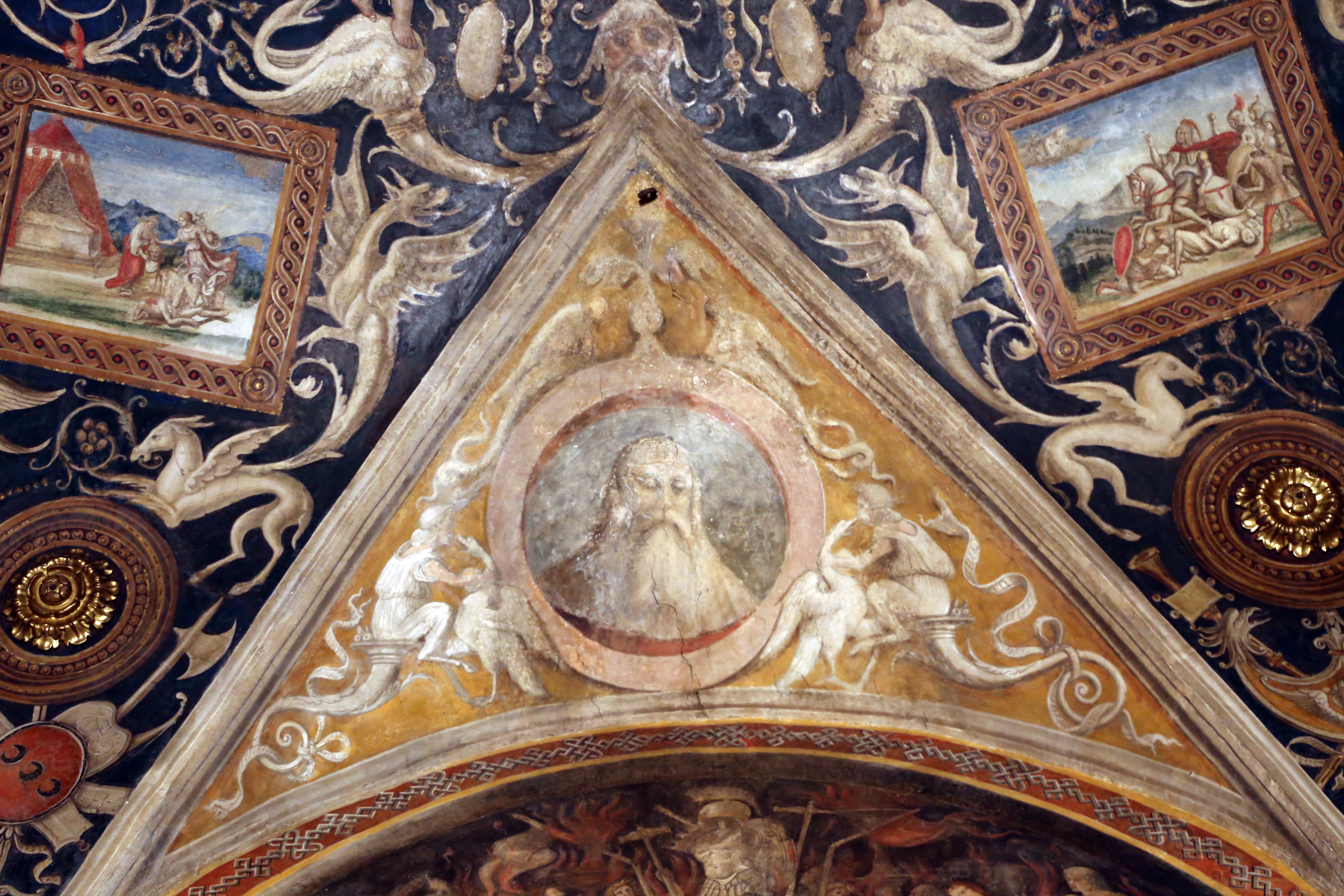
Vault

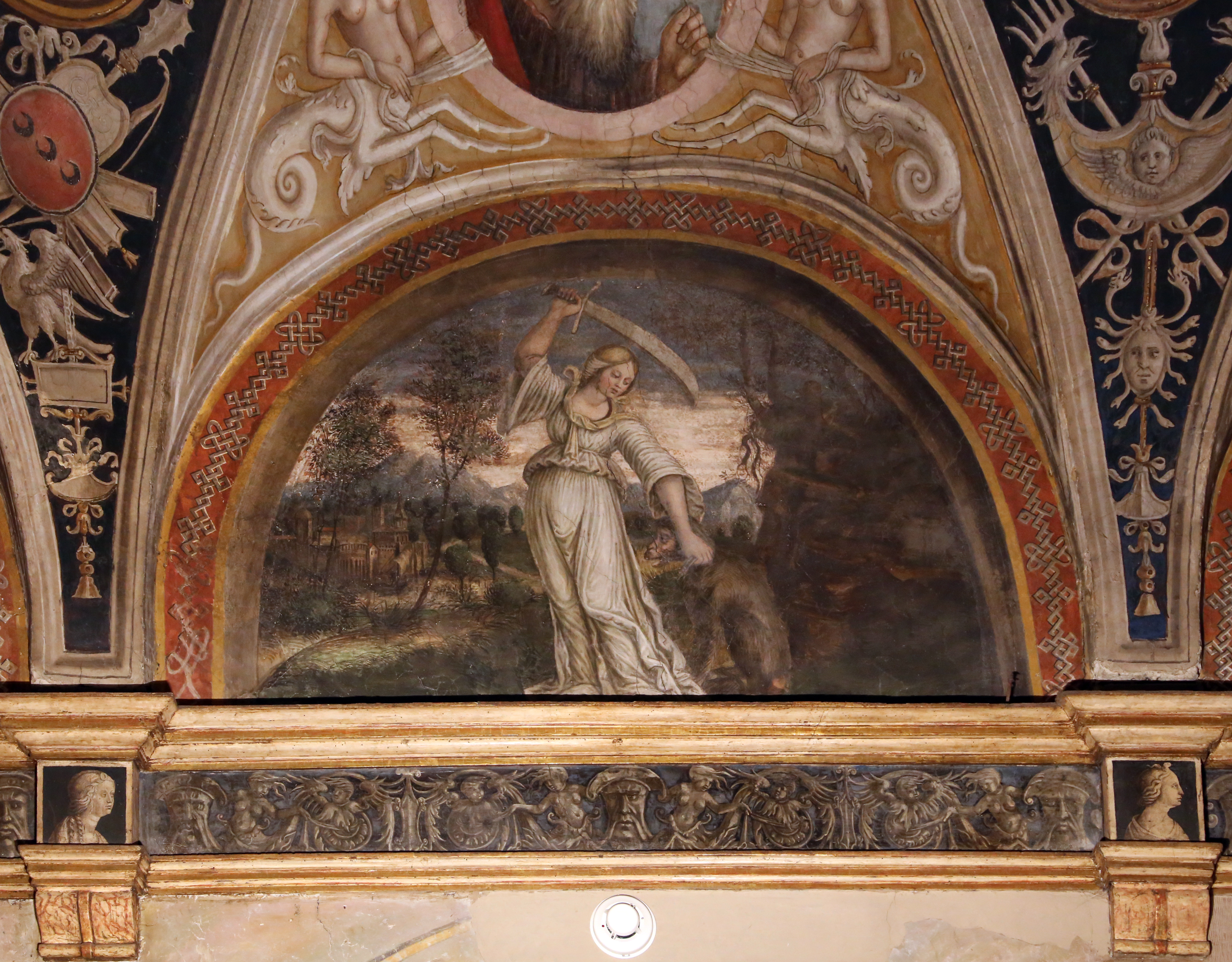
Lunette with scenes of devotion and sacrifice (1514)

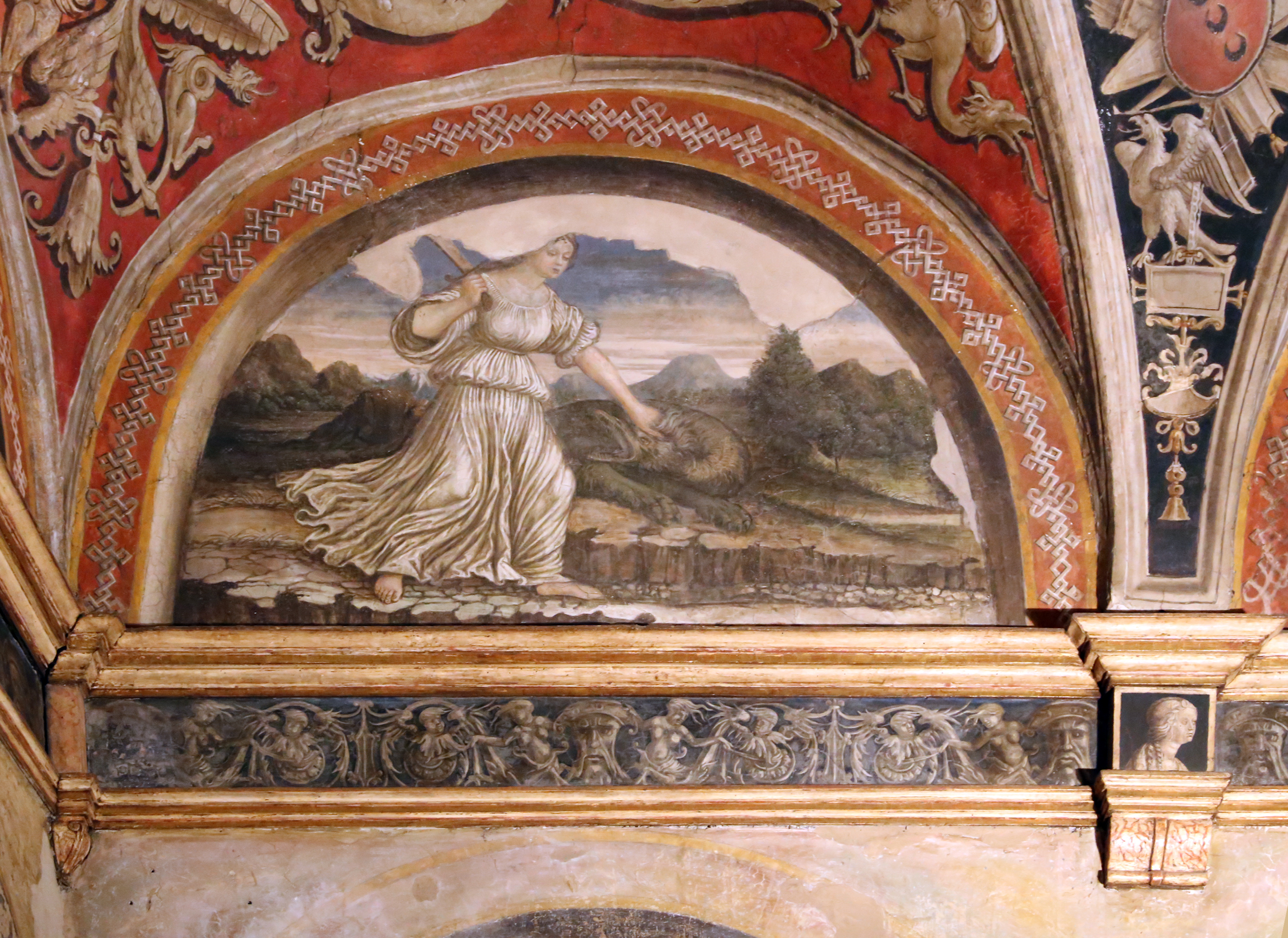
Lunette

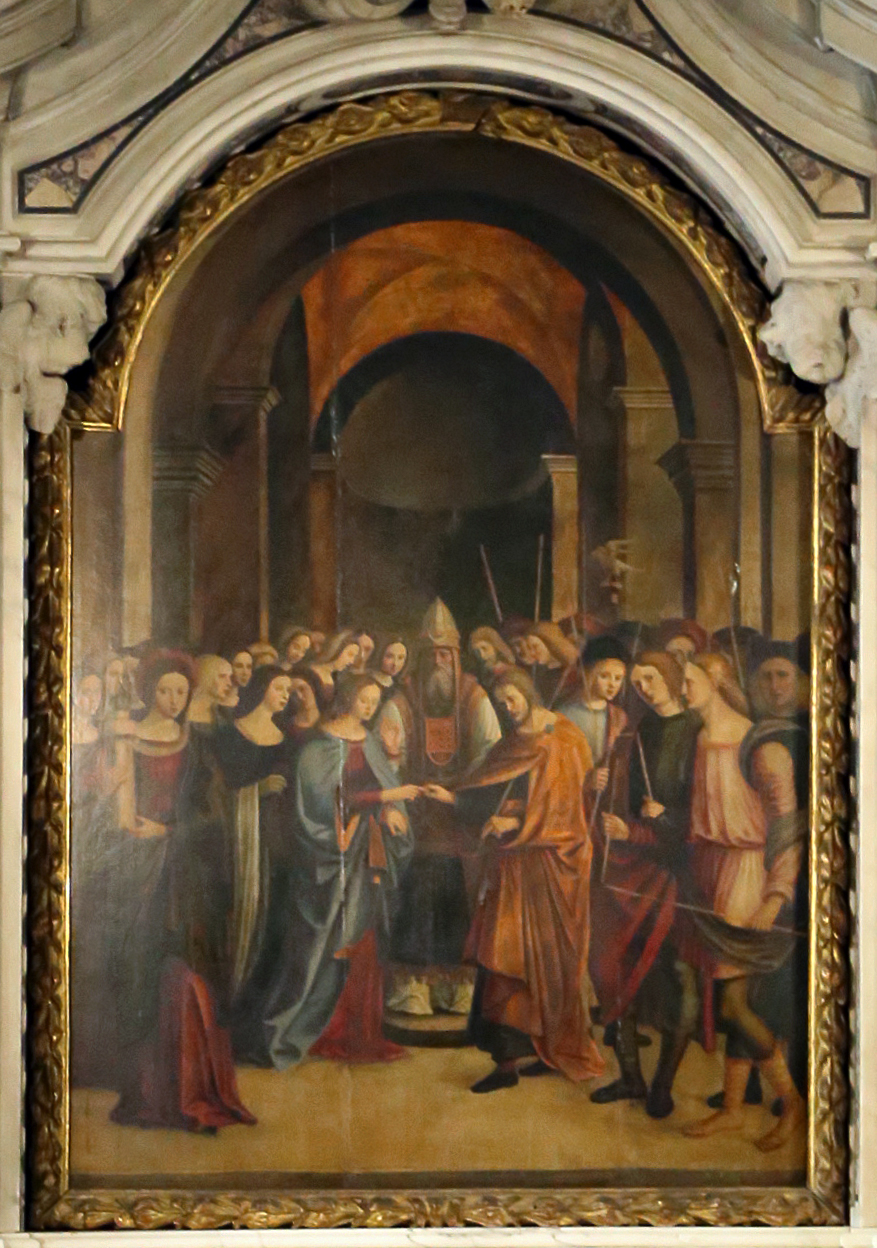
Marriage of the Virgin (1519)

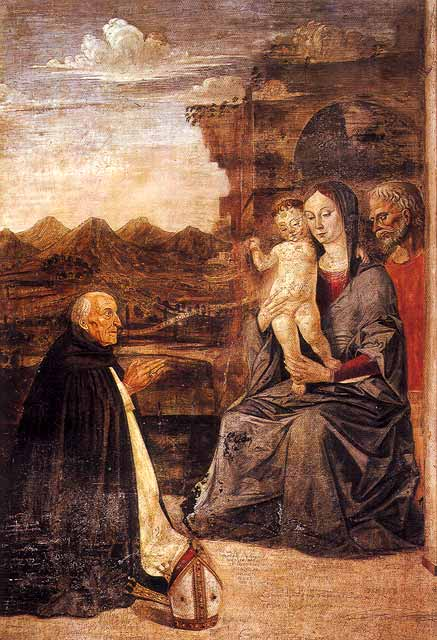
Holy Family with Bishop Domenico of Imola (1496)

== Sources ==
- Farquhar, Maria (1855). Ralph Nicholson Wornum (ed.). Biographical catalogue of the principal Italian painters. London: Woodfall & Kinder. p. 10.
- Ticozzi, Stefano (1830). Dizionario degli architetti, scultori, pittori, intagliatori in rame ed in pietra, coniatori di medaglie, musaicisti, niellatori, intarsiatori d'ogni etá e d'ogni nazione' (Volume 1). Milan: Gaetano Schiepatti. p. 72.
