= Casalmaggiore =

Casalmaggiore Casalmagiùr (Emilian)
- Comune
- Città di Casalmaggiore
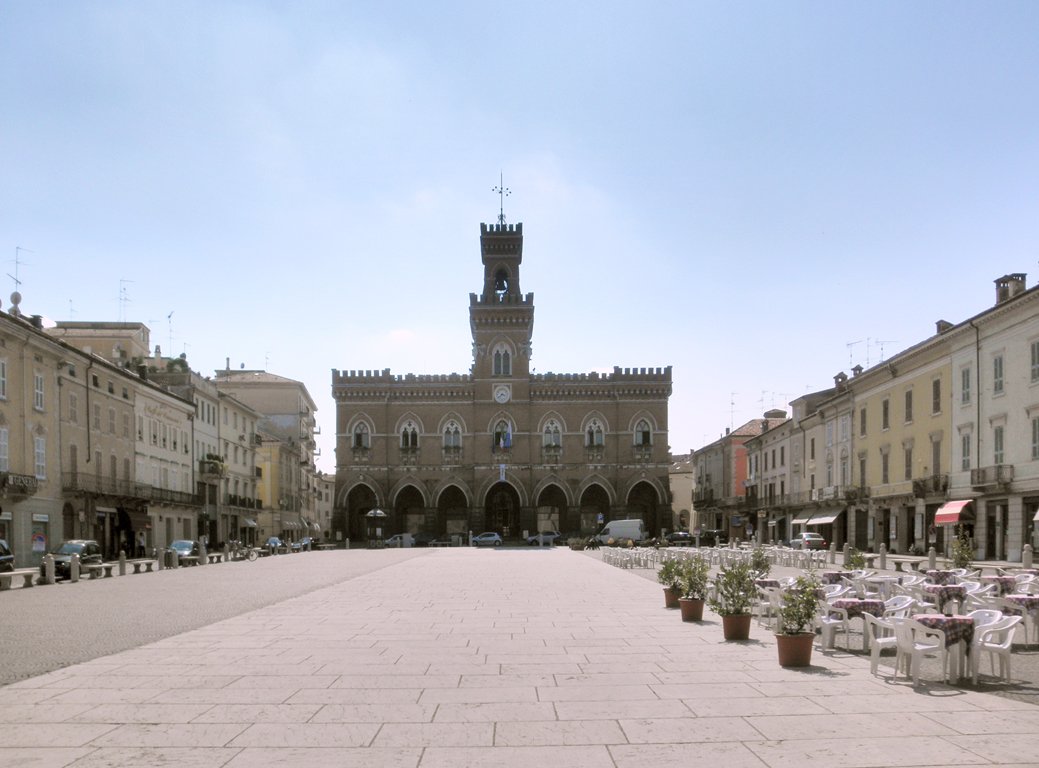

- Coat of arms

- Location within Italy Location within Lombardy
- Coordinates: 44°59′N 10°25′E
- Country: Italy
- Region: Lombardy
- Province: Cremona (CR)
- Frazioni: Agoiolo, Camminata, Cappella, Casalbellotto, Fossacaprara, Motta San Fermo, Quattrocase, Roncadello, Valle, Vicobellignano, Vicoboneghisio, Vicomoscano

Government
  - Mayor: Filippo Bongiovanni

Area
  - Total: 60 km^{2} (23 sq mi)
- Elevation: 26 m (85 ft)

Population (31 May 2017)
  - Total: 15,378
  - Density: 260/km^{2} (660/sq mi)
- Demonym: Casalaschi
- Time zone: UTC+1 (CET)
  - Summer (DST): UTC+2 (CEST)
- Postal code: 26041
- Dialing code: 0375
- Patron saint: St. Charles
- Saint day: November 4
- Website: Official website

Casalmaggiore (Casalasco-Viadanese: Casalmagiùr) is a comune in the province of Cremona, Lombardy, Italy, located on the Po River. It was the birthplace of Italian composers Ignazio Donati and Andrea Zani. Recently, its women's volleyball team Volleyball Casalmaggiore has played in the Serie A1, winning the championship in the 2014–15 season.

Sights include the Duomo (cathedral), the Museo Diotti, and the Bijoux Museum.

== History ==
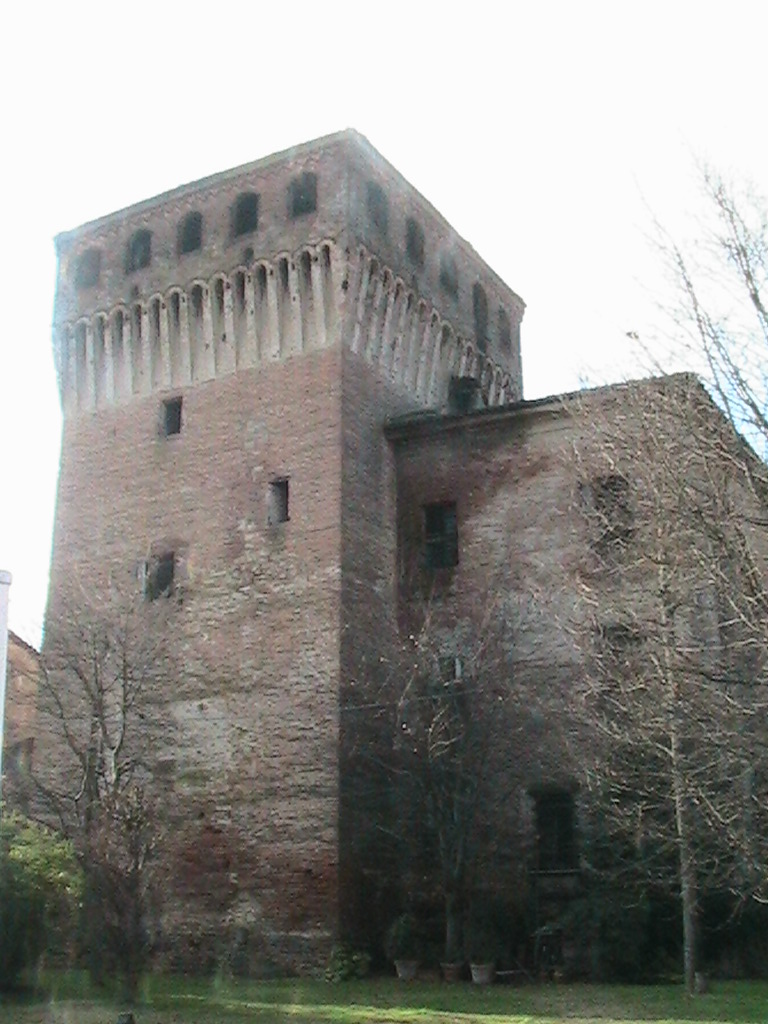
Torrione Estense

Archaeological findings in 1970 proved that the area was inhabited from the Bronze Age, although the town most likely was founded by the Romans as Castra Majora ("Main Military Camp"). Around the year 1000 it was a fortified castle in the House of Este lands; in the 15th century it was under the Republic of Venice. On July 2, 1754, it obtained the status of city with an imperial decree. After a period under the Austrians, it became part of the newly unified Kingdom of Italy in 1861.

== Twin towns ==
- Guilherand-Granges, France
- Tarnów, Poland

== See also ==
- Castles of the Duchy
