= Peter Whitehouse =

English cricketer and British army officer

Personal information
- Full name: Peter Michael William Whitehouse
- Born: 27 April 1917; Birchington, Kent, England
- Died: 19 November 1943 (aged 26); Archi, Abruzzo, Italy
- Batting: Right-handed
- Bowling: Right-arm medium
- Role: All-rounder

Domestic team information
- Years: Team
- 1935: Berkshire
- 1936–1938: Oxford University
- 1937–1938: Kent
- FC debut: 10 June 1936 Oxford University v Minor Counties
- Last FC: 6 August 1938 Kent v Sussex

Career statistics
Competition	First-class
Matches	24
Runs scored	927
Batting average	28.96
100s/50s	0/7
Top score	91*
Balls bowled	2,815
Wickets	43
Bowling average	29.46
5 wickets in innings	1
10 wickets in match	0
Best bowling	5/33
Catches/stumpings	4/–
- Source: CricInfo, 8 October 2018

Peter Michael William Whitehouse (27 April 1917 – 19 November 1943) was an English cricketer and British army officer who played for Oxford University and Kent County Cricket Club. Whitehouse died on active service in Italy during World War II.

== Early life ==
Whitehouse was born at Birchington in Kent in 1917, the son of Henry and Majorie Whitehouse. His father was the Indian general manager of Strauss and Co, a British seed and grain merchant with branches throughout the Indian subcontinent, and Whitehouse spent time in India in his youth. His parents were later divorced, his mother living in Maidenhead and at Middle Wallop in Hampshire.

Whitehouse was educated at Marlborough College where he played in the cricket XI between 1933 and 1935, scoring 355 runs and taking 35 wickets in 1935. He was selected for the Lord's Schools against The Rest in 1935. As a schoolboy he was thought of as a bowling all-rounder who bowled "with beautiful action and length" and developed into a fine all-round player. He played five Minor Counties Championship matches for Berkshire County Cricket Club in August 1935 after leaving school.

His father committed suicide in January 1936 whilst in India, the result of a decision by Strauss and Co. to cease trading. Whitehouse went up to New College, Oxford later in the same year.

== Cricket career ==
Whitehouse made his first-class cricket debut for Oxford University in June 1936. He played for Kent County Cricket Club's Second XI the same season, and won a cricket Blue in 1938, playing 16 first-class matches for the university. He appeared in eight matches for Kent in 1937 and 1938.

In total Whitehouse played in 24 first-class matches, scoring 927 runs and taking 43 wickets. His highest score of 91 not out was scored for the university against Leicestershire in 1936 and his best bowling figures, five wickets taken for the cost of 33 runs, were taken for the same team against Free Foresters in 1938.

== Military service and death ==
After enlisting in the Black Watch in March 1941, Whitehouse was identified as a potential officer in the British Indian Army, his father having served in the Karachi Volunteer Artillery. He trained in India as an officer cadet and was commissioned as a lieutenant in the 6th Battalion of the 13th Frontier Force Rifles of the Indian Army in May 1942.

The unit formed part of the 19th Indian Infantry Brigade of the 8th Indian Infantry Division. The division fought in Iraq, Iran, Syria and North Africa before it landed at Taranto in September 1943 and fought its way up the Italian peninsula, during which Whitehouse was killed at Archi in November 1943 aged 26. He is buried in the Sangro River War Cemetery in Torino di Sangro in Chieti.

== Bibliography ==
- Carlaw, Derek (2020). Kent County Cricketers, A to Z: Part Two (1919–1939) (PDF). Cardiff: ACS.
