= Great Hockham =

Village in Norfolk, England

Coordinates: 52°29′46″N 0°52′34″E

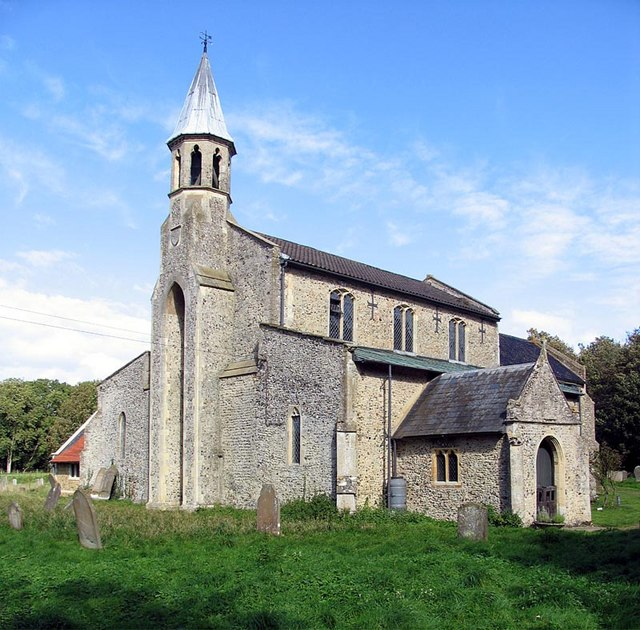
- Holy Trinity, Great Hockham

- Location within Norfolk
- OS grid reference: TL9534192573
- Civil parish: Hockham
- District: Breckland
- Shire county: Norfolk
- Region: East
- Country: England
- Sovereign state: United Kingdom
- Post town: Thetford
- Postcode district: IP24
- Dialling code: 01953
- Police: Norfolk
- Fire: Norfolk
- Ambulance: East of England
- UK Parliament: Mid Norfolk

Great Hockham is a village in the English county of Norfolk within the civil parish of Hockham.

Great Hockham lies 8 miles (13 km) north east of Thetford and 24 miles (39 km) south west from Norwich.

== History ==
Great Hockham's name is of Anglo-Saxon origin and derives from the Old English for the larger Hocca's homestead or village.

In the Domesday Book, Hockham is listed as a settlement of 39 households in the hundred of Shropham. In 1086, the village was part of the East Anglian estates of Roger Bigod.

Hockham Hall was built in 1702 by Philip Ryley and was built on the old site of a medieval tithe barn.

There remains of the Royal Observer Corps Orlit post which has been vandalised since it was abandoned.

== Geography ==
The A1075, between Thetford and Dereham, passes through the village.

== Holy Trinity Church ==
Great Hockham's church is located just off Wretham Road and dates from the Fourteenth Century, having been Grade I listed since 1958. The church holds Sunday services once every six weeks

The church was restored in the 1950s and was once lavishly decorated, but these decorations were removed during the Reformation. Holy Trinity also features stained-glass depicting the Adoration of the Magi by Charles Eamer Kempe and Christ the Good Shepherd by E.R. Suffling.

== Governance ==
Great Hockham is part of the electoral ward of All Saints & Wayland for local elections and is part of the district of Breckland.

The village's national constituency is Mid Norfolk which has been represented by the Conservative's George Freeman MP since 2010.

== Notable residents ==
- Christopher Bush- (1885-1973) crime novelist, born in Great Hockham.

== War Memorial ==
Great Hockham War Memorial is a tall marble cross located inside Holy Trinity Churchyard. The memorial lists the following names for the First World War:

Rank	Name	Unit	Date of death	Burial/Commemoration
LCpl.	Frederick J. H. Gates	1/4th Bn., Norfolk Regiment	19 Apr. 1917	Gaza War Cemetery
A2C	Thomas A. Edwards	9 Park, Royal Air Force	15 Feb. 1919	Maubeuge Cemetery
Gnr.	Edward Burlingham	168th Bde., Royal Field Artillery	30 Oct. 1917	Minty Farm Cemetery
Pte.	Edward W. Church	8th Bn., Bedfordshire Regiment	19 Apr. 1917	Loos Memorial
Pte.	George W. Matthews	6th Bn., The Buffs	9 Aug. 1918	Franvillers Cemetery
Pte.	Absolom Snowley	1st Bn., Coldstream Guards	14 Sep. 1914	La Ferté Memorial
Pte.	Arthur Oldfield	2nd Bn., Coldstream Gds.	30 Sep. 1916	Thiepval Memorial
Pte.	John C. Bell	17th Bn., Royal Fusiliers	30 Nov. 1917	Cambrai Memorial
Pte.	Harry A. Bunnett	2nd Bn., Grenadier Guards	31 Oct. 1914	Menin Gate
Pte.	Thomas R. Teasel	15th (Civil Service) Bn., London Regt.	20 Sep. 1917	Perth Cemetery
Pte.	Reginald E. Kerridge	1st Bn., Middlesex Regiment	3 Nov. 1916	Grove Town Cemetery
Pte.	Sydney A. Mason	1/4th Bn., Norfolk Regiment	19 Apr. 1917	Jerusalem Memorial
Pte.	Leonard Matthews	1/5th Bn., Norfolk Regt.	21 Jul. 1915	Holy Trinity Churchyard
Pte.	George H. Ellis	7th Bn., Norfolk Regt.	5 Oct. 1915	Bethune Town Cemetery
Pte.	George E. Frost	7th Bn., Norfolk Regt.	30 Mar. 1918	Condé Cemetery
Pte.	H. William Church	1st Bn., Wiltshire Regiment	25 Feb. 1919	Terlincthun Cemetery
Pte.	Sidney H. Matthews	10th Bn., Worcestershire Regiment	22 Mar. 1918	Arras Memorial

The following names were added after the Second World War:

Rank	Name	Unit	Date of death	Burial/Commemoration
Sgt.	Harry Parker	Royal Air Force Volunteer Reserve	4 Jun. 1943	Holy Trinity Churchyard
ASn.	Kenneth A. Smith	HMS Pembroke	15 Jun. 1947	Holy Trinity Churchyard
ASn.	William A. J. Pike	HMS Victory	29 Jun. 1940	Holy Trinity Churchyard
LAC	George H. Grimwood	Royal Air Force Volunteer Reserve	5 Mar. 1945	Holy Trinity Churchyard
Rfn.	Leonard A. Hawes	2nd Bn., Royal Irish Rifles	2 Dec. 1943	Sangro River War Cemetery
