= Robert Baldock (disambiguation) =

Robert Baldock (died 1327) was the Lord Privy Seal and Lord Chancellor of England.

Robert Baldock may also refer to:

- Robert Baldock (judge) (1624/5–1691), English judge
- Bob Baldock (1937–2022), American citizen who participated in Cuban Revolution

== See also ==
- Robert Baldick (1927–1972), British academic
