= China Wall =

China Wall may refer to:

- Great Wall of China
- Perth (China Wall) Commonwealth War Graves Commission Cemetery
- Nickname of Johnny Bower, professional ice hockey goaltender

== See also ==
- Chinawal, a village in the Jalgaon district of Maharashtra state, India
