= Robert Baldock (judge) =

Sir Robert Baldock (1624/5 – 1691), was an English judge.

== Biography ==
Baldock was the son and heir of Samuel Baldock of Stanway, in Essex, bore the same arms as Robert de Baldock, lord chancellor in Edward II's reign. Entering as a student at Gray's Inn in 1644, he was called to the bar in 1651. There appears to be no contemporary allusion to his early professional career beyond Roger North's mention of him in connection with a 'fraudulent conveyance managed by Sir Robert Baldock and Pemberton,' the chief justice, which he thinks 'Baldock had wit and will enough to do' (North's Life of Lord Guilford, 223). In 1671 he was recorder of Great Yarmouth, and was knighted on the king's visit to that town. In 1677 he took the degree of serjeant, and was autumn reader to his inn of court; and on the accession of James II he became one of the king's serjeants. The only event of any importance in which he is known to have taken a part was the trial of the seven bishops, in which he was one of the counsel for the king. His principal argument, in a tedious irrelevant speech, is that the reasons given by the bishops for not obeying the king are libellous, inasmuch as 'they say they cannot in honour, conscience, or prudence do it; which is a reflection upon the prudence, justice, and honour of the King in commanding them to do such a thing'.

This argument seems to have commended him so strongly to the king that within a week he was promoted to a seat in the King's Bench, two of the judges, Sir John Powell and Judge Holloway, being removed in consequence of having expressed opinions in favour of the accused bishops (Sir J. Bramston's Autobiography, 311). The revolution which took place before the beginning of next term drove the new judge from the bench before he had time to render himself liable to the condemnation which in the next reign fell on so many of his fellow judges, of whom no less than six were excepted from the act of indemnity in consequence of their assistance to James II in his unconstitutional proceedings.

The remaining three years of Sir Robert's life were spent in obscurity. He died on 4 Oct. 1691, and was buried at Hockham in Norfolk, in the parish church of which is a monument erected by him to his only son, Robert, who was killed in a naval battle in 1673. His first wife was Mary, the daughter of Bacqueville Bacon (third son of Sir Nicholas of Redgrave), and one of the three co-heiresses of her brother Henry, who was lord of the manor of Great Hockham. She having died in 1662, he married again, but the name of his second wife is not known.
