= Pasquale Verrusio =

Italian painter

- Born: November 24, 1935; Rome
- Died: February 12, 2012 (aged 76); Torino di Sangro

Pasquale Verrusio (24 November 1935 – died Torino di Sangro, Italian Republic, 12 February 2012) was an Italian painter, sculptor and engraver.

== Biography ==
Pasquale Verrusio was born in the Garbatella district in Rome to a small bourgeois family of employees. After abandoning his studies at the Technical Institute for Surveyors, he devoted himself to painting as a self-taught artist.

In 1957, he studied figure and nude drawing at the French Academy at Villa Medici. In the same year, he met and became a student of Renato Guttuso. In 1959, his work is noted at the VIII Quadrennial Exhibition in Rome, where his works were selected by the jury and praised by the national press. In 1960 he founded the group "Libertà-Realtà" (Freedom-Reality) with the painters Confetti, Ganna, Piero Guccione, Gino Guida, Carlo Quattrucci, Reggiani and Aldo Turchiaro. They proposed a new figuration which opposed the notion of abstract art as 'the only valid expression of modern artistic creation. Their only exhibition was in 1961 at the Galleria Stagni in Rome. It was a great national success, and it attracted the attention of art critic Lionello Venturi. In the same year, he was invited by the Florentine group Corrente 2 to hold his first solo exhibition. He received several awards including the "Premio Gennazzano", "Premio Città di Marsala", "Golfo di La Spezia", and "XI Premio Biennale Italia-Austria" from the Republic of San Marino.

In 1962, he exhibited at the Festival dei Due Mondi in Spoleto, and, in the following year, having won a scholarship from the French government, he moved to Paris. Here he attended Atelier 17, the studio of English engraver Stanley William Hayter and displayed his work at the Salon de la Jeune Peinture. That same year, he had his first solo exhibition at the Galleria Don Chisciotte in Rome, presented by Dario Micacchi. On his return from Paris, he helped to introduce artists such as Eduardo Arroyo, Gilles Aillaud, Tisserand and Biras in Italy. In 1963, he also participated in the completion of the copies of the Acacus rock paintings commissioned by the Pigorini Museum in Rome.

In 1967, with Ugo Attardi, Bruno Caruso, Alberto Gianquinto, Piero Guccione, Alessandro Manzo, Laura Mazza and Alberto Mondadori, he founded the Galleria Il Gabbiano in Rome. In 1971, he joined the group of the Galleria Il Fante di Spade, directed by Netta Vespignani, who was a representative of the Nuova Scuola Romana.

In 1973, after moving to Milan at the invitation of the art dealer Mario Roncaglia, he had a period of intense critical debate and artistic exchange with Gianfranco Ferroni and Perez.

Between 1965 and 1978, Verrusio exhibited frequently, both in solo and group shows. Of note are the collective exhibition at the Galleria La Nuova Pesa in Rome, and the solo exhibition of graphic arts at the Libreria Internazionale Terzo Mondo; the 16éme and 18ème Salon de la Jeune Peinture Paris in 1965 and 1967 respectively. Also, the exhibitions at The Macquarie Galleries in Sydney and the Roman Gallery in Chicago in 1966, the solo exhibition at the Galleria Il Gabbiano in Rome in 1968 and the Galleria la Mutina in Modena in 1969 and 1972, the XXVIII Biennale Nazionale d'Arte Città di Milano in 1973–1974, the Days of Italian Culture in the U.R.S.S. in Moscow and Leningrad, and at the Galleria Margutta in Pescara in 1978. In 1983 and 1986, he had his solo exhibitions in Cairo and Stockholm respectively – both sponsored by the Italian Cultural Institute.

From 1985 to 1993, he was professor of Visual Representation Technique at the European Institute of Design in Rome. He exhibited at the Galleria La Vetrata in Rome in 1989 and 1990. In 1991 he won the 'Premio Sulmona' and in 1992 he moved to Abruzzo, where, in 1994 he founded the 'European Art Centre 'Le Morge with the painter Éteras, whom he married in 2009.

In 1996, he displayed his works at the exhibition "La Pittura Colta in Italia" in Rodengo Saiano, curated by Floriano De Santi. In 2000, he was invited with Èteras to exhibit at the University of Grand Junction in Colorado, where for three months they both taught Italian fresco. In 2003, his work was commissioned for the exhibition "Una Storia Verosimile – 25 Anni di Collaborazione tra Artisti Italiani e Sandro Gindro", organised in Rome at the Teatro Vascello. Between 2005 and 2009, he founded alongside Éteras, his artist's studio and school in Stuttgart. In 2008, he exhibited in Reggio Emilia at the "La Collezione Zavattini – Unicità e Fantasia del Piccolo Formato". He died in Torino di Sangro in February 2012 after a long illness.

== Style and technique ==
Verrusio's stylistic research follows a well-defined path: from a production focused on the lesson from Renato Guttuso since 1957, to his own 'poetic light' where the details of reality are sublimated into a clearly articulated conceptual framework since the mid-60s.

The Parisian experience led him to analyze the 'human condition' under a psychological profile. He had already started on this theme some years before, and it would accompany him throughout his artistic production. In the first half of the '60s he also experiments with different painting techniques, including materic textured painting that recall Rembrandt and Francis Bacon – as in L'Uscita dal Metrò e Composizione of 1963. In the same year, he undertook his fundamental research for a new figuration where the image is created from light; a modus operandi that characterized his entire career and of which he was a pioneer through an attentive and careful study of works by Piero della Francesca and Caravaggio. From the mid-1960s, his attention focused on the representation of mechanical objects and the waste of the consumer society; such as tubular and fences, immersed in a monotone light where the line between dignity and degradation is blurred and a sense of loneliness and anxiety pervades all. This sense of claustrophobia of the everyday is also found in the production of the first years of the 1970s. In the series of the Bocciatori and Interni, the use of cold light has a fundamental role in creating an uneasiness in the everyday situations and gestures represented, as well as in the play between solid and void. References to Vermeer's paintings have been made in relation to Verrusio's interpretation of rural life and still lifes. Here the light undergoes a tonal change to warmer colours, and normality becomes a solemn moment. Representative of these themes are the 'Still Lives with Figs and Lemons' and the portrait of Natuccio and Giovannina of 1975. The most abstract form of this poetic and pictorial approach is found in the series of the Sassi, which began almost a decade earlier during a visit to the Island of Elba. In this regard, Renzo Vespignani wrote:

The lens is even smaller, and the search for an 'everything in focus' both cruel and unmoved together, burns every remaining twilight; the lens is focused and restricted as much as the conscience of the painter expands, and the object fills the canvas with no evidence of any effort. The world could be said to be reduced to a still life, but a still life – this still life – is elevated to the rank of absolute and pivotal phenomenon. It is a fatal mechanism that Verrusio realizes aggregating, overlapping, locking, around the same subject, the results of a more widespread observation: the pebble, smoothed by the wind from the sea, is found in every position possible, under every possible light, and is reborn countless times, totally possessed, in a succession of surfaces, curves, volumes, always the same and always different.

In the 1980s, the focus shifted on the relation between the pebbles and the movement and the transparency of the water, as well as with the introduction of figures in the marine landscape. In the 1990s, a new interpretation of the coloristic and use of light by Caravaggio leads to a thematic renewal: in the Foro Romano cycle, the light becomes twilight and cites the tradition of the Scuola Romana. The representation of Vestal and monuments has metaphysical and allegorical connotations. In the early 2000s, the predominant theme is the marine and American landscape. Verrusio's latest production maintains the use of twilight, and thematically focuses on self, where he continues his careful conceptual analysis of the 'symbiosis of objective and subjective' through the exploration of the self and his illness.

== Exhibitions ==
Solo Exhibitions

- Florence, Galleria Corrente 2, 1961
- Rome, Don Chisciotte, 1963
- Rome, Terzo Mondo, 1964
- Rome, La Nuova Pesa, 1965, 1966
- Milan, L'Agrifoglio, 1966
- Rome, Il Gabbiano, 1968
- Modena, La Mutina, 1969, 1972
- Rome, Il Fante di Spade, 1972, 1974
- Viareggio, Premio Fondazione Viani – Premio Saporetti (prize winner), 1980
- Cairo, Istituto Italiano di Cultura, 1983
- Stockholm, Galleria Hedström-Ogebjer, 1986
- New York, Schmidt-Bingham Gallery, 1986
- Rome, La Vetrata, 1989, 1990

Collective Exhibitions

- Rome, Quadriennale di Roma, 1959–60
- Rome, Prima Mostra del Gruppo "Libertà – Realtà", Galleria Stagni, 1961
- Republic of San Marino, Premio Italia-Austria-Repubblica di San Marino (prize winner), 1961
- Spoleto, Tendenze della Pittura Contemporanea' al Festival dei Due Mondi di Spoleto, 1962
- Milan, I Premio Nazionale di Pittura Paderno Dugnano (prize winner), 1964
- Paris, 16ème Salon de la Jeune Peinture, 1965
- Sydney, Modern and Contemporary Painters, The Macquarie Galleries, 1966
- Chicago, Modern Italian Painters, Roman Gallery, 1966
- Paris, 18ème Salon de la Jeune Peinture, 1967
- Arezzo, Per Copia Conforme, 1971
- Milan, XXVII Biennale Nazionale d'Arte Città di Milano, Palazzo della Permanente, 1971–1972
- Florence, Biennale Internazionale D’Arte – XXI Premio del Fiorino, 1973
- Milan, XXVIII Biennale Nazionale d'Arte Città di Milano, Palazzo della Permanente, 1973–1974
- Moscow and Leningrad, Giornate della Cultura Italiana nell’ U.R.S.S., 1974
- Rome, Una Storia Verosimile – 25 Anni di Collaborazione tra Artisti Italiani e Sandro Gindro, Teatro il Vascello, 2003
- Reggio Emilia, La Collezione Zavattini – Unicità e Fantasia del Piccolo Formato, 2008

== Bibliography ==
- AA.VV., Prima Mostra del Gruppo Libertà – Realtà, Galleria Stagni, Rome, 1961
- AA.VV., Nuova Enciclopedia, Vol. VI S-Z, Editrice Italiana di Cultura, Rome, 1965
- AA.VV., Catalogo Bolaffi d'Arte Moderna 1968 – La Vita Artistica Italiana nelle stagioni 1965/1966 e 1966/1967, Giulio Bolaffi Editore, Turin, 1967, pp. 4185–4186
- AA.VV., Graphis Arte, Catalogo N. 2 – Acquerelli, Disegni, Incisioni, Litografie, Pastelli di Artisti Contemporanei Italiani e Stranieri, Edizioni Stamperia d’Arte, Livorno, 1969
- AA.VV., Bolaffi Arte, N. 26, Year IV, January 1973
- AA.VV., XI Rassegna Nazionale di Pittura – Città di Pistoia – Più Vero del Vero, Pistoia, 1983
- AA.VV., Idea di Roma, Galleria Trifalco, Edizioni Trifalco, Rome, 1986
- AA.VV., Verrusio – Il Mare, Il Fiume, La Campagna, Exhibition Catalogue at the Istituto Italiano di Cultura, Stockholm, Hedström e Ogebjer, 1986
- AA.VV., Pasquale Verrusio, Galleria D’Arte Contemporanea ‘La Vetrata’, Rome, 1990
- AA.VV., XVIII Premio Sulmona – Mostra Nazionale d'Arte Contemporanea, Circolo d'Arte e Cultura " Il Quadrivio" Di Sulmona, Sulmona, 1991
- AA.VV., La Collezione Zavattini – Unicità e Fantasia del Piccolo Formato, Grafiche Martinelli, Bagno a Ripoli (Florence), 2008
- 32 Galleria d'Arte, Catalogue January/February 1973
- Pino Allamprese, Alberto Giuseppini (ed), Una Storia Verosimile – 25 Anni di Collaborazione tra Artisti Italiani e Sandro Gindro, Edizioni Psicoanalisi Contro, Rome, 2003, p. 72
- Antonio Del Guercio, Pasquale Verrusio, La Nuova Pesa, No. 42, 4 January 1966, Rome, 1966
- Giorgio Di Genova, Storia dell'arte italiana del '900, Generazione Anni Trenta, Bora, 2001, ISBN 8885345816
- Savino Di Lernia, Daniela Zampetti, La Memoria dell’Arte: Le Pitturi Ruperstri dell Acacus tra Passatp e Futuro, All’Insegna del Giglio, Borgo San Lorenzo (Florence), 2008, pp. 59–61
- Domenico Guzzi (ed), Albo dei Pittori e degli Scultori 1993, ENAP – Ente Nazionale Assistenza e Previdenza Pittori, Scultori, Musicisti, Scrittori, Autori Drammatici, Editore Laterza, Verona, 1993
- Domenico Guzzi (ed), Albo dei Pittori e degli Scultori 2001, ENAP – Ente Nazionale Assistenza e Previdenza Pittori, Scultori, Musicisti, Scrittori, Autori Drammatici, Editori Laterza, Bari, 2001, p. 468
- Domenico Guzzi, L’Anello Mancante – Figurazione in Italia negli Anni ’60 e ’70, Vol I pp. 84–85, 111–113, 175–77, 288–291, 338–339, 453–454, 468–469, Vol. II, Editori Laterza, Bari, 2002, pp. 394–395
- Mario Lunetta, ‘Roma – Il Piacere dell’Immagine: Acquerelli di Verrusio alla Vetrata’, Roma – Ieri, Oggi, Domani, Anno III, no.20, Febbraio 1990, Newton Periodici, Rome, 1990, p. 116
- Mario Lunetta,Pasquale Verrusio – Effimero Perenne – Olii, Pastelli, Acquerelli e Sculture, Galleria MGP Arte Contemporanea, Rome, 1995
- Mario Lunetta, ed Floriano de Santi, "La Pittura Colta" in Italia – Anacronisti, Citazioni e Ipermanieristi tra anni '80 e la Fine del Millennio, Centro Internazionale "U Mastroianni" del Castello di Ladislao di Arpino, 1996
- Alan Magee, Stones and Other Works, Harry N Abrahams, New York, 1987, p.115
- Dario Micacchi, Cesare Vivaldi, Rassegna della Giovane Pittura Italiana, Genazzano 8–30 September 1972
- Dario Micacchi, Pasquale Verrusio, Mostra dell’Istituto Italiano di Cultura per la R.A.E, Cairo, 1983
- Duilio Morosini, Immagini degli Anni '60: Poesia e Verità Vol 6, Due Mondi – Galleria d'Arte Internazionale, Rome, 1966
- Nicola Ranieri, VerrusioÉteras – L'Arte Non Muore, Meta Edizioni, Sambuceto, 2011
- Mario Roncaglia, Aillaud, Ferroni, Gillespie, Guerreschi, Luporini, Maselli, Mc Garrell, Recalcati, Romagnoni, Schlosser, Perez, Verrusio, Vespignani, Ziveri, Galleria il Fante di Spade, Rome, 1972
- Franca Sacerdote (ed), Dizionario-guida ai Pittori e Scultori Moderni e Contemporanei, Libri de Il Mondo, Supplement to Il Mondo, no. 38–11 September 1981 (Direttore Paolo Panerai), Rizzoli Editore, Milan, 1981, p. 141
- Franco Solmi (ed), I Collana d'Arte Contemporanea – Per Copia Conforme – dall'Eremita di Massa all'Oggetto Biologico, Rassegna d'Arte Arezzo Aprile-Maggio, Grafis Edizioni, 1971
- https://www.academia.edu/1265994/The_Rock_Art_of_the_Acacus_Mts._SW_Libya_Between_Originals_and_Copies consultato il 14 February 2016
- https://www.abruzzo24ore.tv/news/E-morto-Pasquale-Verrusio-Fu-allievo-di-Guttuso/70932.htm consultato il 13 November 2016
- https://www.abruzzolive.tv/E__MORTO_IL_PITTORE_PASQUALE_VERRUSIO-_-_a_2984.html consultato il 13 November 2016
