= John Anderson (VC) =

Recipient of the Victoria Cross

Major John Anderson VC DSO TD
- Born: 12 January 1918; Hampstead, London, England
- Died: 5 October 1943 (aged 25); Termoli, Italy
- Burial place: Sangro River War Cemetery, Italy
- Military career
- Allegiance: United Kingdom
- Branch: British Army
- Service years: 1940–1943
- Rank: Major
- Nickname: Jack
- Service number: 126502
- Units: Argyll and Sutherland Highlanders
- Commands: 8th Battalion, Argyll and Sutherland Highlanders
- Conflicts: Second World War
- Awards: Victoria Cross; Companion of the Distinguished Service Order

Major John Thompson McKellar Anderson VC, DSO, TD (12 January 1918 – 5 October 1943) was a British Army officer and a recipient of the Victoria Cross, the highest award for gallantry in the face of the enemy that can be awarded to British and Commonwealth forces.

== Early life ==
Anderson was educated at Stowe School, where he was in Chatham House along with his close friend Leonard Cheshire, who was also awarded the VC. He subsequently attended Trinity College, Cambridge.

== Second World War ==
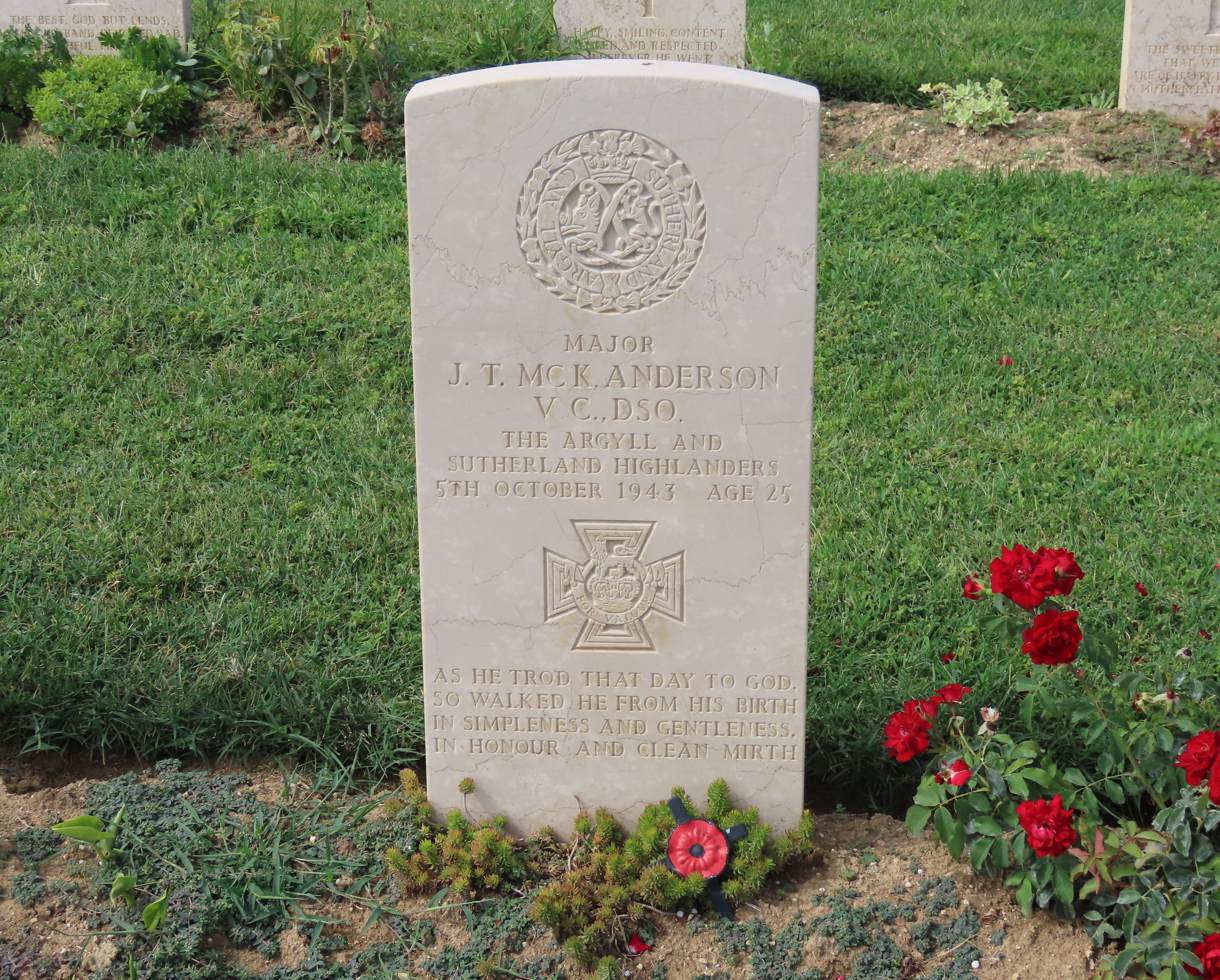
Anderson's grave at the Sangro River War Cemetery

In 1943, during the Second World War, Anderson was an acting major in the 8th Battalion, Argyll and Sutherland Highlanders (Princess Louise's), in Tunisia. He had been promoted from "lieutenant (temporary captain)" in which rank he was appointed a Companion of the Distinguished Service Order "in recognition of gallant and distinguished services in North Africa", but that award had not yet been published when the action took place for which he was awarded the VC, on 23 April 1943 at the Battle of Longstop Hill. The citation reads:

For conspicuous gallantry and outstanding devotion to duty during the attack on "Longstop" Hill, Tunisia, on the 23rd April, 1943.

Over a period of five hours Major Anderson led the attack through intense enemy machine-gun and mortar fire. As leading Company Commander he led the assault on the Battalion's first objective, in daylight, over a long expanse of open sloping hillside and most of the time without the effective cover of smoke. Enemy infantry opposition was most determined, and very heavy casualties were sustained, including all other rifle Company Commanders, before even the first objective was reached.

On the first objective and still under continual enemy fire, Major Anderson reorganised the Battalion and rallied men whose Commanders, in most cases, had been either killed or wounded. The Commanding Officer having been killed, he took command of the Battalion and led the assault on the second objective. During this assault he received a leg wound, but in spite of this he carried on and finally captured "Longstop" Hill with a total force of only four officers and less than forty other ranks. Fire had been so intense during this stage of the attack that the remainder of the Battalion were pinned down and unable to advance until Major Anderson had successfully occupied the hill.

During the assault, he personally led attacks on at least three enemy machine-gun positions and in every case was the first man into the enemy pits; he also led a successful attack on an enemy mortar position of four mortars, defended by over thirty of the enemy. Major Anderson's force on the hill captured about 200 prisoners and killed many more during the attack. It is largely due to this officer's bravery and daring that "Longstop" Hill was captured, and it was the inspiration of his example which encouraged leaderless men to continue the advance.

He was killed in action at Termoli, Italy on 5 October 1943. He was buried at the Sangro River War Cemetery in Abruzzo, Italy.

His Victoria Cross is displayed at the Argyll and Sutherland Highlanders Museum, Stirling Castle, Scotland.
