= Godfrey Estcourt Matthews =

Brigadier-General Godfrey Estcourt Matthews CB CMG
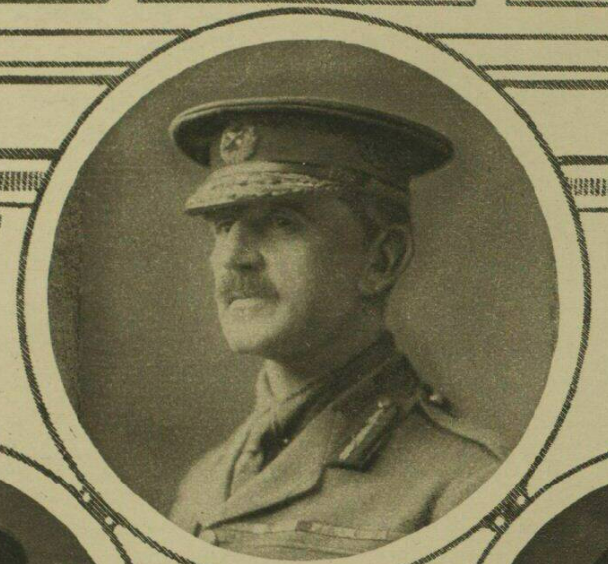
- Born: 17 June 1866
- Died: 13 April 1917 (aged 50)
- Burial place: Bethune Town Cemetery, Pas-de-Calais, France
- Military career
- Branch: Royal Marine Light Infantry; Egyptian Army; British Army
- Commands: Plymouth Battalion, Royal Naval Division; 198th (East Lancashire) Brigade

Brigadier-General Godfrey Estcourt Matthews, CB, CMG (17 June 1866 – 13 April 1917), known as Matthews Pasha in Egyptian service, was a British Royal Marines officer. After serving for sixteen years in Egypt and the Sudan, he commanded a battalion of the Royal Naval Division at Gallipoli, before being killed in France in 1917, while commanding the 198th (East Lancashire) Brigade.

== Biography ==
=== Early life and career ===
The son of C. J. Matthews, Godfrey Matthews was commissioned into the Royal Marine Light Infantry in September 1884. He passed the Military Instruction Class at Eastney in 1885 with honours and special mention in topography. He then was embarked on various ships, including HMS Duncan, HMS Indus to 1889, and HMS Phaeton from 1890 to 1891.

From 1891 to 1896, he was adjutant of the RMLI's Chatham Division. during which he was made supernumerary on the RMLI establishment from 1895 to 1896. In 1894, he became a captain (additional).

=== Egyptian service ===
Though he had no war service, but having come to favourable notice during his time as adjutant, Matthews was selected for service with the Egyptian Army in December 1896, formally joining the Egyptian Army on augmentation in early 1897. With a few interruptions, he would serve in Egypt and the Sudan until 1913. He took part in the Nile expeditions of 1897, 1898, and 1899 and the battles of Atbara and of Omdurman. He was made a brevet major, RMLI, in 1898.

In 1900, he entered Sudanese government service, as assistant civil secretary. In 1901–1902 he commanded an expedition to the Sudd to remove vegetable obstructions to navigation on the Upper White Nile.

He was Commandant of Fashoda District from 1902 to 1903 and Governor of Upper Nile Province from 1903/1904 to 1910. (Note: Fashoda District became Upper Nile Province in 1903.) In 1910, returned to British service, then to Egyptian service and commanded the Khartoum District until 1913.

For his services in Egypt and the Sudan, Matthews was twice mentioned in despatches, received the second class of the Order of the Medjidie and the third class of the Order of Osmanieh, and the thanks of the Sundanese government. He was appointed a Companion of the Order of the Bath in 1913. In the Egyptian Army, he reached the rank of liwa.

Of his time in the Sudan, M. W. Daly described Matthews as "one of the most indefatigable and conscientious military administrators the government had."

=== First World War and death ===
On the outbreak of the First World War, Matthews was given command of the Plymouth Battalion of the Royal Naval Division. In 1914, he participated in the defence of Antwerp with the battalion. On 25 April 1915, as part of the landing at Cape Helles, Matthews landed his force at Gallipoli (Y Beach). The landing was initially successful, but the troops at Y Beach evacuated the beachhead the following day. On 18 December 1915, Matthews was appointed a Companion of the Order of St Michael and St George "in recognition of his services in command of the Plymouth Battalion, Royal Marine Brigade, Royal Naval Division, at the Dardanelles."

Meanwhile, Matthews had been promoted to colonel second commandant, but was wounded in July 1915. He recovered in time to rejoin his battalion for operations in August. In 1916, he was seconded for service with the British Army and was given command of the 198th (East Lancashire) Brigade.

On 12 April 1917, Matthews was wounded by a shell and died at Béthune the following day. His brigade-major, Major C. W. Gordon-Steward, was also killed by the same shell. Matthews is buried at the Bethune Town Cemetery.

== Family ==
In 1898 Matthews married Mary Frances, eldest daughter of the Rev. Canon Estcourt, vicar of Swindon.

== Bibliography ==
- Davis, Frank; Maddocks, Graham (1995). Bloody Red Tabs - General Officer Casualties of the Great War, 1914-1918. London: Leo Cooper, pp. 90–91.
