= Frederick Birks =

Recipient of the Victoria Cross

Frederick Birks VC MM
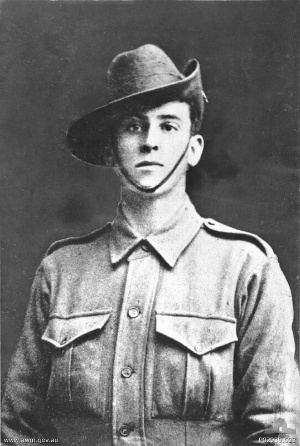
- Second Lieutenant Fredericks Birks VC, MM c.1916
- Born: 16 August 1894; Buckley, Flintshire, Wales
- Died: 21 September 1917 (aged 23); Menin Road Ridge, Passchendaele salient, Belgium
- Burial place: Perth (China Wall) Cemetery
- Military career
- Allegiance: United Kingdom; Australia
- Branch: British Army; Australian Imperial Force
- Service years: 1910–1913; 1914–1917
- Rank: Second Lieutenant
- Units: 6th Battalion
- Conflicts: First World War; Gallipoli campaign (WIA); Landing at Anzac Cove; Battle of Krithia; Western Front; Battle of the Somme; Battle of Pozières; Battle of Passchendaele; Battle of the Menin Road Ridge †
- Awards: Victoria Cross; Military Medal

Frederick Birks, VC, MM (16 August 1894 – 21 September 1917) was a Welsh-born Australian First World War soldier and recipient of the Victoria Cross, the highest decoration for gallantry "in the face of the enemy" that can be awarded to members of the British and Commonwealth forces.

Born in Buckley, Flintshire, Birks served in the Royal Artillery for three years before emigrating to Australia in 1913. After serving as a non-commissioned officer during the landing at Gallipoli and the Battle of the Somme, Birks was commissioned as a second lieutenant on 4 May 1917. On 20 September, during the Battle of Passchendaele, while advancing in Glencorse Wood, Ypres, Birks, alongside a corporal, forced a garrison to surrender and captured sixteen men in another attack. His actions were later recognised with the Victoria Cross. The following day, Birks was killed by a shell while attempting to save some of his men.

== Early life ==
Birks was born in Buckley, Flintshire, Wales, on 16 August 1894 to Samuel Birks, a groom, and his wife Mary, née Williams. The family lived at Garden Cottage, Lane End. The youngest of six siblings, Birks was five years old when his father died in a coal-mining accident. He attended the local Anglican school (St. Matthew's) in Buckley and was awarded a medal there for 11 years "without ever being absent or late." He was known to be adventurous, being active in boxing and association football as well as the local Church Lads' Brigade. Birks left school at fourteen, before entering the workforce as a labourer and steel rollerman in nearby Shotton. During 1910, Birks is thought to have enlisted in the Royal Artillery, staying in the service for three years. On 29 August 1913, Birks migrated to Australia with two friends Emrys Edward Jones and William Gray (both from Buckley). They sailed from London on the SS Otway disembarking in Melbourne. He went on to work in Tasmania where he stayed with a Herbert Jones (a friend of his brother), South Australia and Victoria as a labourer and later, a waiter. In late March 1914, at the age of nineteen he started a relationship with sixteen-year-old Susan Gelven who lived in Largs Bay. Susan kept in contact with Birks throughout his service, although she apparently lost contact with him for some time in mid-1917. He is known to have lived in Norwood, a suburb of Adelaide where he lodged with a Mrs E. Cornelius, and in Hobart.

== First World War ==
Birks enlisted into the Australian Imperial Force on 18 August 1914, a few weeks after the war started. He trained at a camp in Broadmedows, and was assigned to the 2nd Field Ambulance of the Royal Australian Army Medical Corps. The 2nd Field Ambulance boarded HMAT A18 Wiltshire in Melbourne on 19 October 1914 and set sail for Egypt. After stopping in Albany, the unit arrived in Egypt on 10 December.

=== Gallipoli campaign ===
Birks' unit was incorporated into the Mediterranean Expeditionary Force and was sent into action at the landing at Anzac Cove, providing medical support for the 2nd Infantry Brigade. The 2nd Brigade were also sent to Cape Helles, where they assisted in the attack on Krithia. During the battle, Birks was carrying wounded under heavy shell and rifle fire, in areas where stretchers were unable to reach. His "devotion to duty and good work" earned him his first Military Medal recommendation. On 26 June 1915 Birks was wounded by shrapnel but returned to service the next day, remaining on Gallipoli until 9 September.

=== France ===
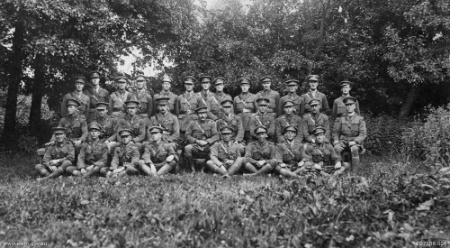
The officers of the 6th Battalion, 23 July 1917. Birks is in front row, last on right

Birks unit was sent to Marseille, France, as a part of the British Expeditionary Force. He was promoted to lance corporal on 21 April 1916 and served as a stretcher bearer during the Battle of the Somme. On 26 July Birks was engaged in duties at Pozières, as the Australian and British forces fought for supremacy of the village. Throughout the day, Birks "continually led his squad of stretcher bearers" through the village and Pozières Wood to the frontline, all the while being "exposed to heavy shell fire". Commended for his "constant good services", Birks was recommended for the Military Medal. The announcement of the decoration was promulgated in a supplement to the London Gazette on 14 November 1916, and he was later presented with his Military Medal by Lieutenant General Sir William Birdwood.

Birks was promoted as a temporary wagon orderly corporal on 5 August 1916 and the rank was made substantive five days later. After his unit moved away from the front line, Birks had an opportunity to return to Buckley. There, he visited his old school and gave them a Turkish flag that he had obtained while in Gallipoli. Following his return to France, Birks was hospitalised for five days with pyrexia. He rejoined his unit on 14 February 1917.

=== Commissioning ===
Birks took classes at the Australian 1st Division school in France, and was commissioned as a second lieutenant in the 6th Battalion on 4 May 1917. He had served with the battalion earlier while a stretcher bearer, and began serving as an infantryman at Passchendaele. Passchendaele was characterised by the mud of the battlefield and has been widely used as an example of attrition warfare; both the Commonwealth and German forces were suffering heavy casualties. When the Fifth Army was failing to make any appreciable headway, Field Marshal Sir Douglas Haig put General Herbert Plumer in command of the offensive.

=== Victoria Cross ===
Birks' battalion were ordered to attack and capture the German line parallel to them with the objective to also blow them up, and the men moved towards their positions from Zillebeke on the night of 18 September, coming under some fire from gas shells. 19 September was incident-free, with the battalion preparing to attack the next day, in what would become known as the Battle of Menin Road. Early in the morning of the 20th, a "light drizzle" fell over the battlefield and at 4 am the Germans sent barrages in front of and behind the battalion's position. At 5:40 am, the battalion advanced.

The first resistance was met by Birks and a corporal, taking two machine-gun positions as another group of officers rushed a strong post. They were attacked with bombs, and the corporal was seriously wounded. Birks continued on alone. Reaching the rear of the pillbox, he forced the occupants to surrender. Birks then led an attack a series of dugouts and pillboxes on the edge of Glencorse Wood, and fought against machine gun and bombs. He also assisted in the reorganisation and consolidation of Australian men who had drifted away from their unit.

The next day, 21 September, enemy shelling in response to the movement of Allied artillery had buried some men in Birks' platoon. Birks attempted to dig out these men, "standing exposed", but another shell aimed at the C Coy post killed Birks, and four others, before he could save them.

== Legacy ==
For his actions at Ypres, Birks was subsequently awarded the Victoria Cross, the announcement of which was gazetted on 8 November 1917. His citation read:

War Office, 8th November, 1917

His Majesty The KING has been graciously pleased to approve of the award of the Victoria Cross to the undermentioned Offices, Non-commissioned Officers and Man: —

2nd Lt. Frederick Birks, Late Aust. Imp. Force.

For most conspicuous bravery in attack when accompanied by only a corporal, he rushed a strong point which was holding up the advance. The corporal was wounded by a bomb, but 2nd Lt. Birks went on by himself killed the remainder of the enemy occupying the position, and captured a machine gun.

Shortly afterwards he organised a small party and attacked another strong point which was occupied by about twenty-five of the enemy, of whom many were killed and an officer and fifteen men captured.

During the consolidation this officer did magnificent work in reorganising parties of other units which had been disorganised during the operations.

By his wonderful coolness and personal bravery 2nd Lt. Birks kept his men in splendid spirits throughout. He was killed at his post by a shell whilst endeavouring to extricate some of his men who had been buried by a shell.

Birks' grave is in the Perth (China Wall) Commonwealth War Graves Commission Cemetery near Ypres. A memorial was constructed at his old school in Wales in 1921, funded largely by contributions from local people. When the school was demolished the Memorial was moved to outside St. Matthew's Church where it stands now. On Remembrance Sunday the local branch of the British Legion continues to place a wreath of poppies on the Memorial. A portrait of Fred is on display at the Australian War Memorial in Canberra, alongside his Victoria Cross. He is also remembered in the Museum in Ypres, Belgium (Cloth Hall). His service during the war earned him the 1914–15 Star, British War Medal and Victory Medal.

== Notes ==
Ribbon	Description	Gazetted
	Victoria Cross (VC)	1917
	Military Medal (MM)	1916
	1914–15 Star	
	British War Medal	
	Victory Medal	
