= Bethune Town Cemetery =

WWI CWGC cemetery in Pas-de-Calais, France

- Commonwealth War Graves Commission
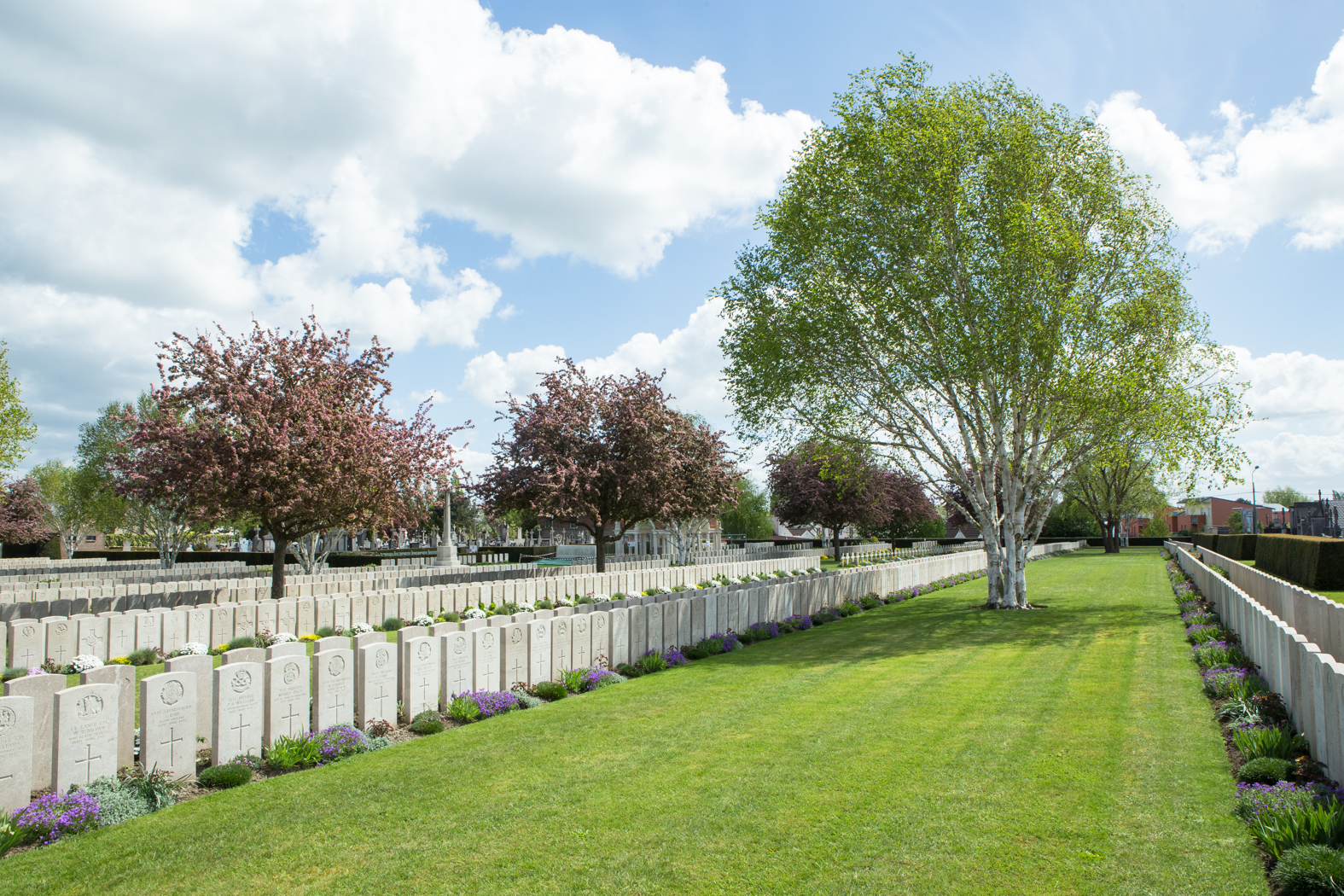
- Used for those deceased 1917–1918
- Established: 1918
- Location: 50°32′19.0″N 02°38′42.6″E near Béthune, Pas-de-Calais, France
- Designed by: Edwin Lutyens
- Total burials: 3,233

Burials by nation
- Allied Powers: United Kingdom: 2,923; France: 122; Canada: 55; India: 26; Central Powers: Germany: 87

Burials by war
- World War I: 269

Bethune Town Cemetery is a World War I cemetery in Béthune, Pas-de-Calais, France.

== Burials ==
- Lord Ninian Crichton-Stuart
- Godfrey Estcourt Matthews
