= Torino di Sangro =

- Comune
- Comune di Torino di Sangro
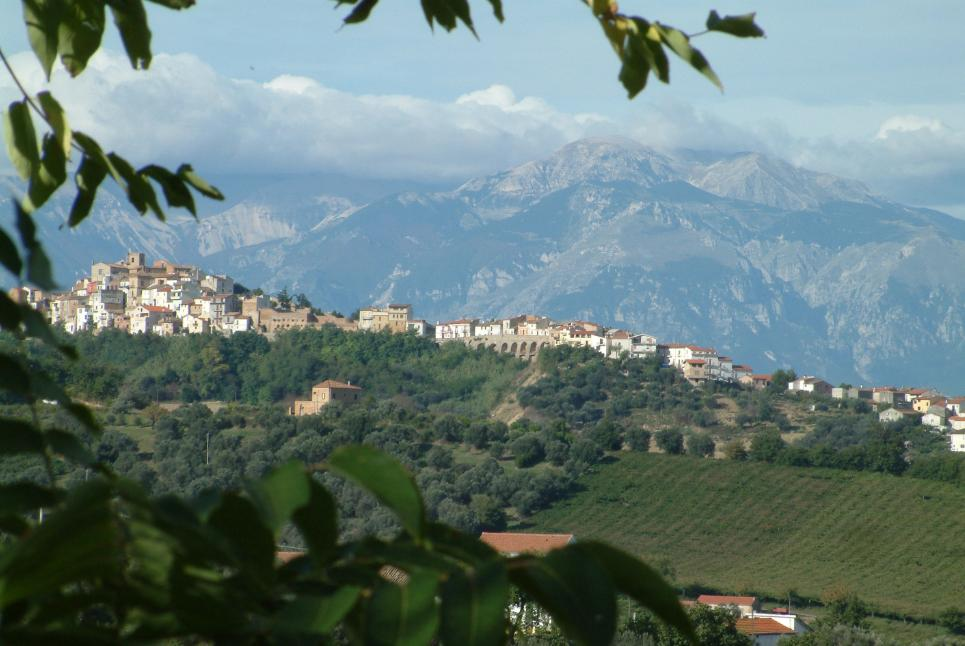
- The country and the mountain Majella

- Location within Italy Location within Abruzzo
- Coordinates: 42°11′N 14°32′E
- Country: Italy
- Region: Abruzzo
- Province: Chieti (CH)
- Frazioni: Civita, Colle Longo, Colle Termine, Lago Dragone, Morticcio, Piana di Sodero, Quarticelli, San Tommaso, Torino di Sangro Marina, Uomoli

Government
  - Mayor: Nino Di Fonso

Area
  - Total: 32.12 km^{2} (12.40 sq mi)
- Elevation: 164 m (538 ft)

Population (31 December 2021)
  - Total: 2,924
  - Density: 91.03/km^{2} (235.8/sq mi)
- Demonym: Torinesi
- Time zone: UTC+1 (CET)
  - Summer (DST): UTC+2 (CEST)
- Postal code: 66020
- Dialing code: 0873
- Patron saint: S.S. Madonna di Loreto
- Saint day: Last Sunday in May
- Website: Official website

Torino di Sangro (Abruzzese: Turìne) is a comune and town in the province of Chieti in the Abruzzo region of central Italy.

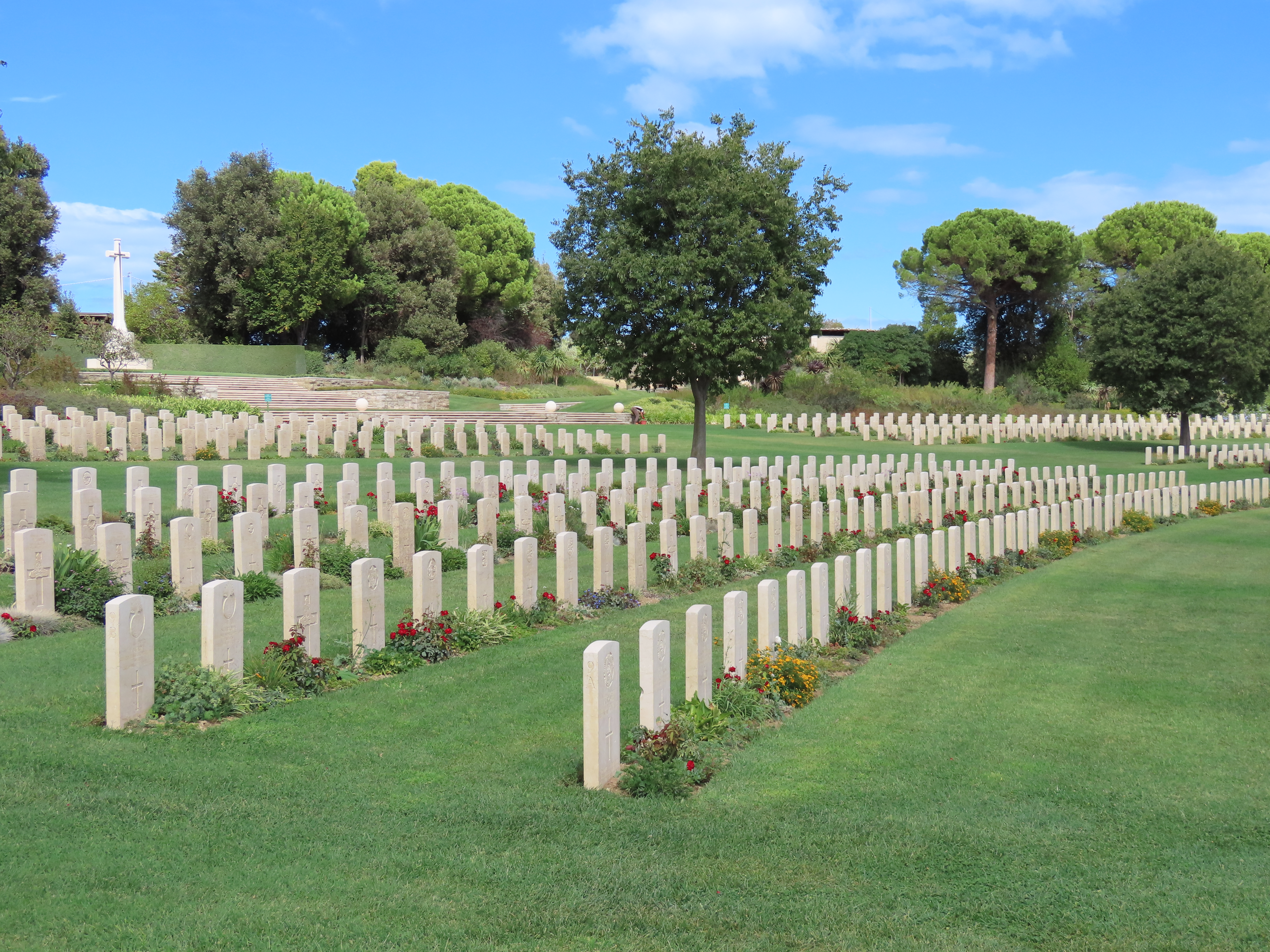
Sangro River War Cemetery

== Main sights ==
- Sangro River War Cemetery

== Climate ==
Climate data for Torino di Sangro, elevation 5 m (16 ft), (1951–2000)
Month	Jan	Feb	Mar	Apr	May	Jun	Jul	Aug	Sep	Oct	Nov	Dec	Year
Record high °C (°F)	22.0 (71.6)	23.0 (73.4)	26.5 (79.7)	30.0 (86.0)	34.5 (94.1)	35.1 (95.2)	38.8 (101.8)	39.2 (102.6)	38.2 (100.8)	33.5 (92.3)	28.2 (82.8)	23.2 (73.8)	39.2 (102.6)
Mean daily maximum °C (°F)	11.2 (52.2)	11.9 (53.4)	14.2 (57.6)	17.7 (63.9)	22.2 (72.0)	26.2 (79.2)	29.6 (85.3)	30.5 (86.9)	26.7 (80.1)	22.0 (71.6)	16.1 (61.0)	12.0 (53.6)	20.0 (68.1)
Daily mean °C (°F)	7.8 (46.0)	8.1 (46.6)	10.1 (50.2)	13.2 (55.8)	17.6 (63.7)	21.5 (70.7)	24.6 (76.3)	25.1 (77.2)	21.6 (70.9)	17.5 (63.5)	12.4 (54.3)	8.7 (47.7)	15.7 (60.2)
Mean daily minimum °C (°F)	4.4 (39.9)	4.4 (39.9)	6.0 (42.8)	8.6 (47.5)	13.1 (55.6)	16.7 (62.1)	19.6 (67.3)	19.7 (67.5)	16.4 (61.5)	13.1 (55.6)	8.8 (47.8)	5.4 (41.7)	11.4 (52.4)
Record low °C (°F)	−3.0 (26.6)	−1.5 (29.3)	−2.5 (27.5)	0.0 (32.0)	5.0 (41.0)	8.8 (47.8)	13.2 (55.8)	11.8 (53.2)	9.2 (48.6)	5.2 (41.4)	0.5 (32.9)	−2.9 (26.8)	−3.0 (26.6)
Average precipitation mm (inches)	57.4 (2.26)	47.9 (1.89)	56.2 (2.21)	52.0 (2.05)	34.1 (1.34)	36.4 (1.43)	35.1 (1.38)	42.1 (1.66)	55.1 (2.17)	73.7 (2.90)	81.1 (3.19)	82.0 (3.23)	653.1 (25.71)
Average precipitation days	6.7	6.2	6.6	5.9	4.8	4.1	3.3	3.7	4.7	6.7	8.0	7.7	68.4
Source: Regione Abruzzo
