= Sangro River War Cemetery =

Cemetery in Torino di Sangro, Italy

- Cimitero Britannico di Torino di Sangro
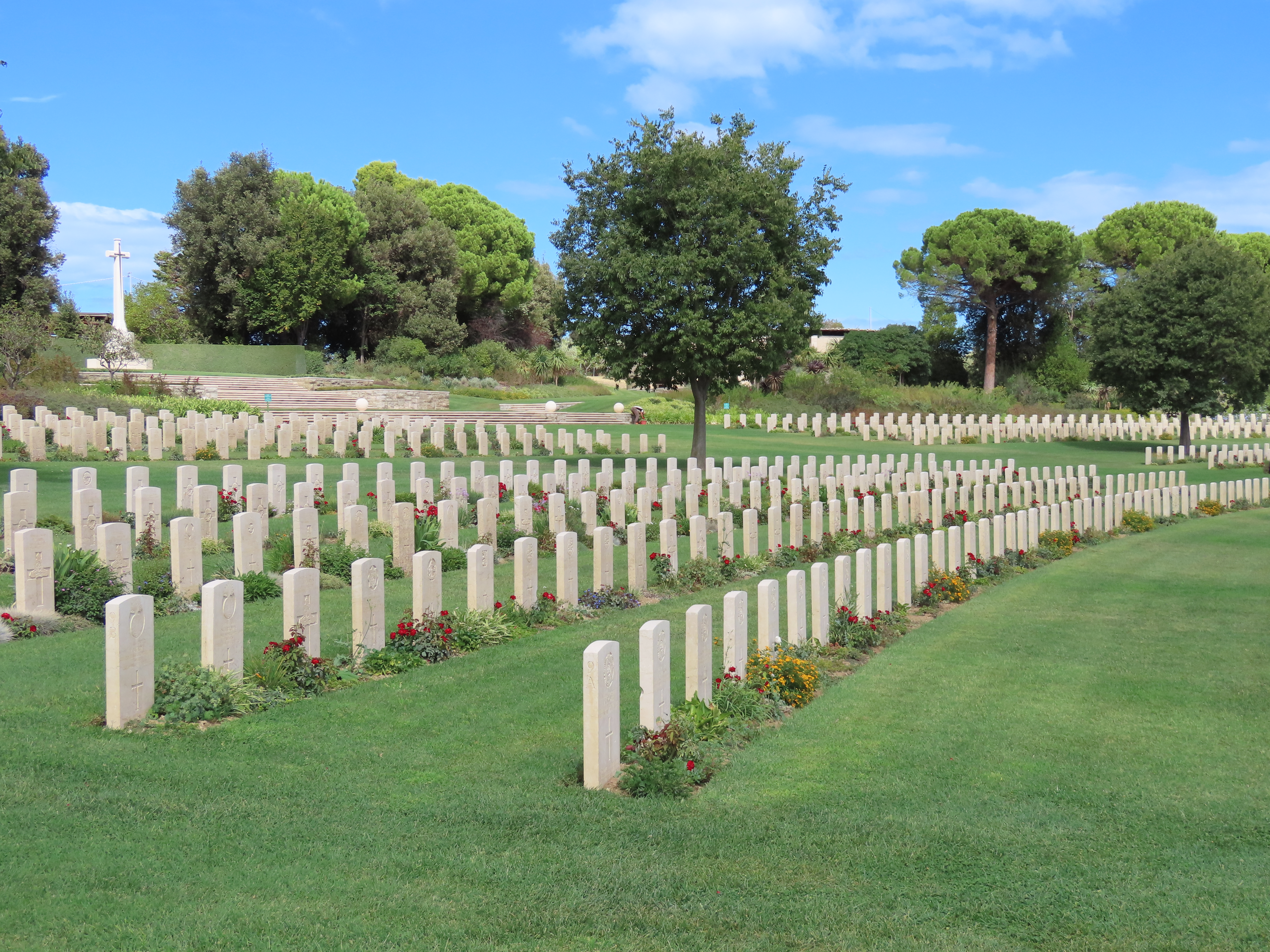
- Interactive map of Sangro River War Cemetery

Details
- Established: 1943
- Location: Torino di Sangro
- Country: Italy
- Coordinates: 42°13′6″N 14°32′8″E
- Type: British military
- Owned by: Commonwealth War Graves Commission
- No. of graves: 2,542
- Find a Grave: Sangro River War Cemetery

Sangro River War Cemetery (Italian: Cimitero britannico di Torino di Sangro) is a British and Commonwealth war cemetery sited by a hillside near Torino di Sangro in the Province of Chieti, Italy.

In this cemetery are buried 2,542 soldiers from the United Kingdom and the British Commonwealth who died in World War II defending the shoreline near the Sangro River against the retreating German soldiers on the Winter Line.

Within the cemetery is the Sangro River Cremation Memorial, which commemorates 517 Indian soldiers cremated in accordance with their faith. The marble gravestones are arranged in such a way as to form a kind of amphitheatre.

A path follows a row of magnolias to the Croce del Sacrificio ("Cross of Sacrifice"). Another path follows a hawthorn hedge to the Porta della Rimembranza ("Door of Remembrance").

The numbers of burials are as follows:

- United Kingdom: 1,768
- Canada: 2
- Australia: 3
- New Zealand: 355
- South Africa: 74
- India: 335
- Other states: 5
- Unknown soldiers: 75

Amongst the burials lies Major John Anderson (1918–1943) who received the Victoria Cross for action at Longstop Hill, Tunisia, in April 1943.
