= Perth (China Wall) Commonwealth War Graves Commission Cemetery =

World War I cemetery in West Flanders, Belgium

Perth (China Wall)
- Commonwealth War Graves Commission
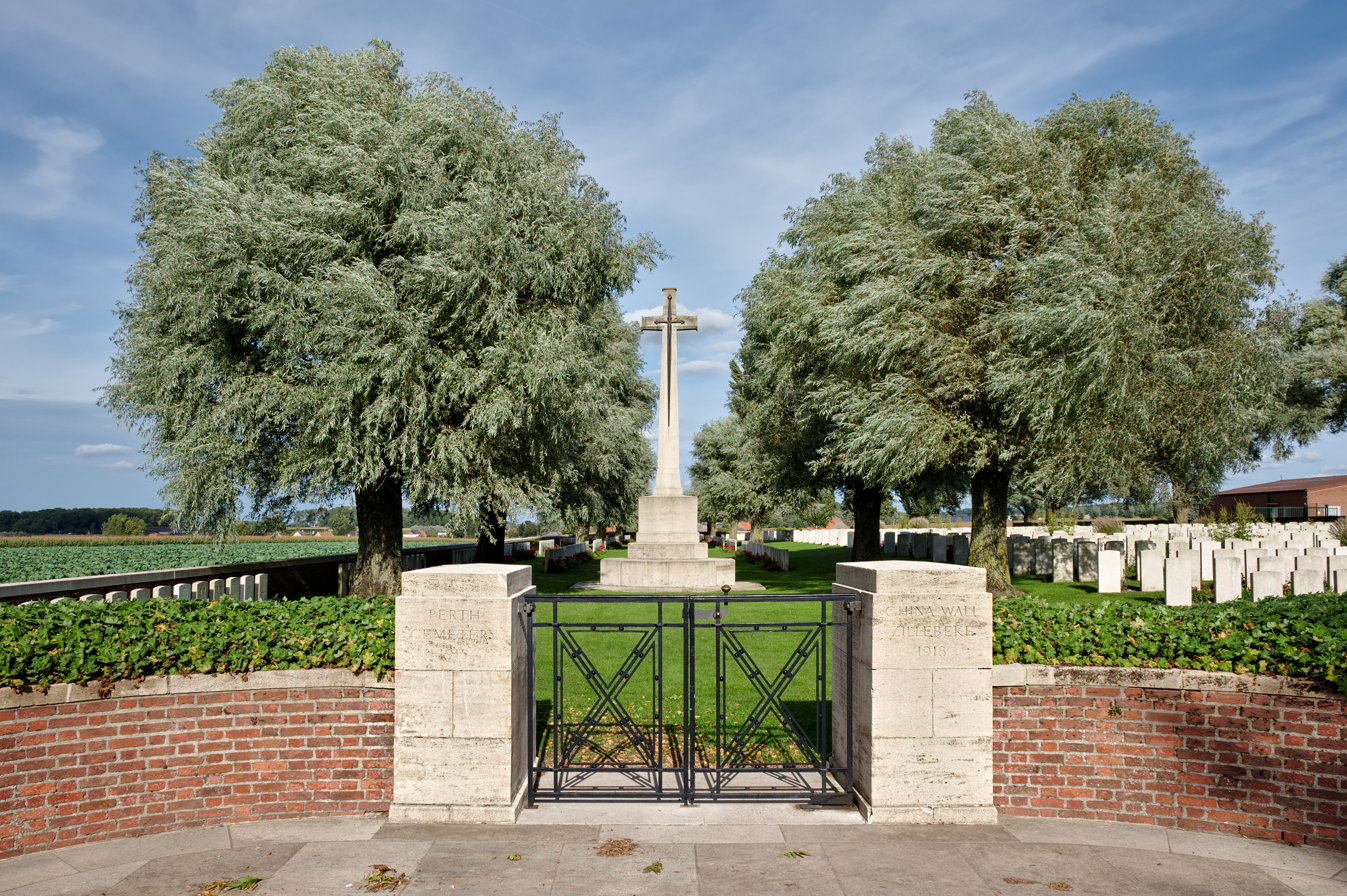
- Entrance to the cemetery
- Used for those deceased 1914–1917
- Established: November 1914
- Location: 50°50′32″N 02°55′19″E near Ypres, West Flanders, Belgium
- Designed by: Sir Edwin Lutyens
- Total burials: 2791

Burials by nation
- Allies of World War I: United Kingdom: 2481; Australia: 147; Canada: 133; New Zealand: 23; South Africa: 7

Burials by war
- World War I: 2791

Perth (China Wall) Cemetery is a Commonwealth War Graves Commission burial ground for the dead of the First World War located near Ypres (Ieper) in Belgium on the Western Front.

The cemetery grounds were assigned to the United Kingdom in perpetuity by King Albert I of Belgium in recognition of the sacrifices made by the British Empire in the defence and liberation of Belgium during the war.

== Foundation ==
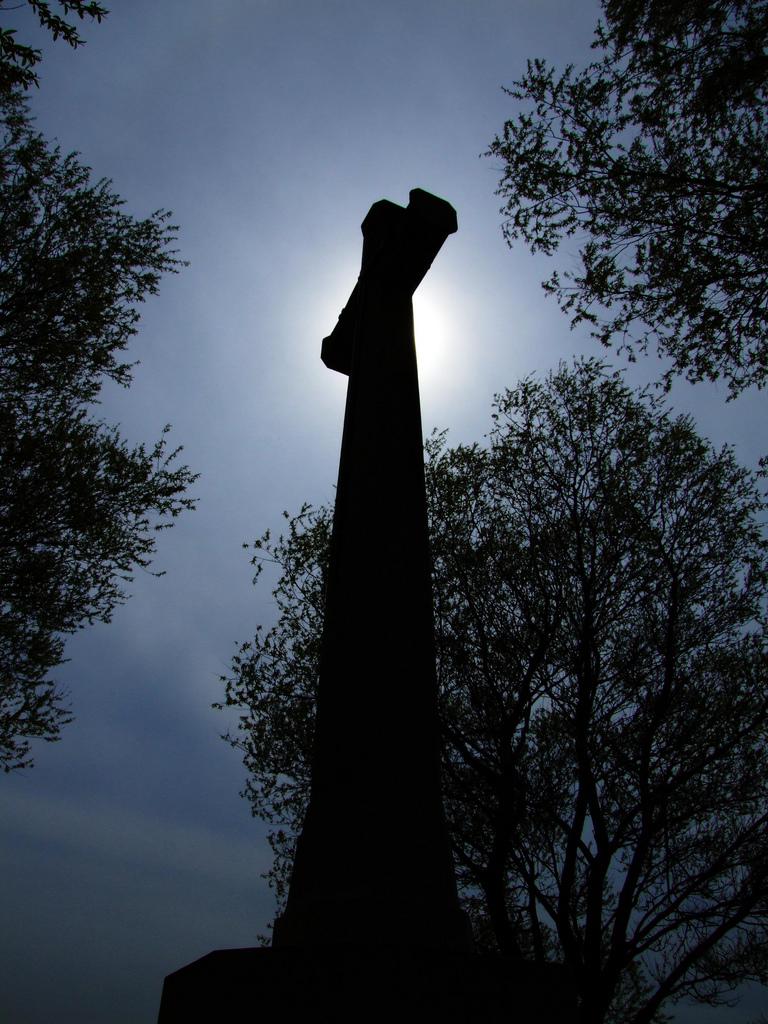
The Cross of Sacrifice

The cemetery was begun in 1914 by French troops and adopted by the 2nd Scottish Rifles in June 1917. A front line cemetery, it was called Perth (as the predecessors of the 2nd Scottish Rifles were raised in Perth), China Wall (from the communication trench known as the Great Wall of China), or Halfway House Cemetery and was in use until October 1917. At the time of the armistice, it was a small cemetery of some 130 graves. It was expanded dramatically by concentration of graves from smaller cemeteries. The French element was also expanded, although these 158 graves have since been removed entirely.

The cemetery was designed by Sir Edwin Lutyens.

== Notable graves ==
=== Victoria Cross recipients ===
Maj. William Henry Johnston VC, Royal Engineers (UK).

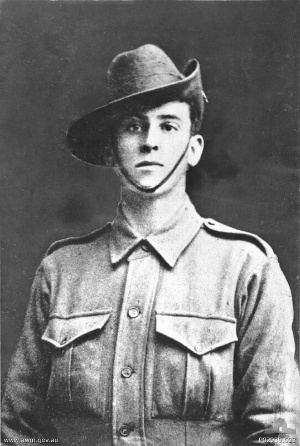
2nd Lt Frederick Birks VC MM, Australian Imperial Force.

This cemetery contains the burial places of two Victoria Cross recipients:

- Major William Henry Johnston (1879–1915), Royal Engineers, of Leith, Scotland, and;
- Second Lieutenant Frederick Birks (1894–1917), 6th Battalion, Australian Imperial Force, who had been born in Flintshire, Wales.

Johnston was awarded the Victoria Cross for an act of bravery on 14 September 1914, at Missy, France during the "Race to the Sea" . His citation stated that, "under a heavy fire all day until 7 p.m.", Johnston operated two rafts, transporting wounded personnel toward the rear and ammunition to the front line.

Birks was awarded the Victoria Cross for an act of bravery at Ypres on 20 September 1917, during the Battle of Passchendaele. His citation stated that he and a corporal had attacked a German strong point that was holding up an Australian advance. After the corporal was wounded, Birks completed the capture of the position, killing the remaining German soldiers there, and capturing a machine gun. "Shortly afterwards ... [leading] a small party ... [Birks] attacked another strong point", occupied by about 25 Germans, killing about 10 of them and capturing a German officer and 15 other ranks.

=== Executed soldiers ===
Perth Cemetery also contains the burial places of British soldiers executed following courts martial. On 7 November 2006, the UK government announced retrospective pardons for all British personnel executed during the Great War. Seven soldiers buried at Perth Cemetery were executed, following a conviction for desertion:

- Private George Ernest Roe, of the King's Own Yorkshire Light Infantry, from Sheffield. He was executed for desertion in June 1915, aged 19.
- Private Thomas Harris, Queen's Own (Royal West Kent Regiment). He was executed for desertion in June 1915, aged 21.
- Private Thomas Docherty, King's Own Scottish Borderers. He was executed for desertion in July 1915.
- Corporal Frederick Ives, Worcestershire Regiment. He was executed for desertion in July 1915, aged 30.
- Private Ernest Fellows, Worcestershire Regiment, from Birmingham. He was executed for desertion in July 1915, aged 29, leaving a wife, Annie, and his parents James and Emma.
- Private Louis Phillips, Somerset Light Infantry. He was executed for desertion in August 1915, aged 23.
- Private Evan Fraser, Royal Scots. Fraser was executed for desertion in August 1915, aged 19. He is commemorated on a special memorial, his original grave having been lost. Fraser absconded from his regiment at 4pm on 24 May 1915. He was arrested the next day at a local railway station in possession of a forged pass and handed back to the British. Whilst in British custody he escaped, but again was caught after little more than 24 hours. Two weeks later, he escaped custody for a second time and again was arrested within a day. On 13 July he was charged with having deserted on three occasions and of conduct to the prejudice of good order (having a forged pass). He was undefended at his trial. He pleaded guilty to the forgery, but not guilty to the counts of desertion. His battalion adjutant gave evidence, saying that Fraser was "a continual source of annoyance", a shirker and a continual deserter. He was shot at 4am on 2 August 1915.

== Concentrated cemeteries ==
The following cemeteries were concentrated into Perth (China Wall):

- Becelaere German No. 1 (2 soldiers)
- Belgian Chateau, Vlamertinghe (12 UK, 11 Canadian)
- Broodseinde German, Zonnebeke (12)
- Durham, Zillebeke (52)
- Garter Point, Zonnebeke (19 Australian, 8 UK, 3 unknown)
- Gordon House No. 2, Zillebeke (30)
- Hans Kirchner German, Poelcapelle (4)
- Houthulst German (1)
- Keerselaere West German, Langemark (29)
- Keerselaerhoek German, Passendale (12 UK, 2 Canadian)
- Langemarck German No. 7 (Totenwaldchen), Langemark (4)
- Langemarch German No. 8, Langemark (27)
- L'Ebbe Farm, Poperinge (21)
- Manneken Farm German No 3, Zarren (13)
- Nachtigall (also known as Rossignol or Vieux-Chien) German, Gheluvelt (69)
- Poelcapelle German No. 2 (96)
- Poelcapelle German No. 3 (23 UK, 19 Canadian)
- Ration Dump Burial Ground, Zillebeke (28 UK, 1 Canadian)
- Reutel German, Becelaere (125 UK, 2 Canadian, 1 New Zealand)
- St Joseph German, Hooglede (4)
- St Julien Communal, Langemark (6 Canadian)
- St Julien East German, (65 UK, 31 Canadian)
- Schreiboom German, Langemark (34)
- Transport Farm Annexe, Zillebeke (27)
- Trench Railway, Zillebeke (21)
- Treurniet German, Poelcapelle (1 Canadian)
- Wallemolen German, Passendale (20 UK, 15 Canadian)
- Weidendreft German, Langemark (98)
- Westroosebeke German No. 2 (1)
