= Museo Civico Giovanni Fattori =

Art museum in Livorno

Coordinates: 43°32′07″N 10°18′19.44″E

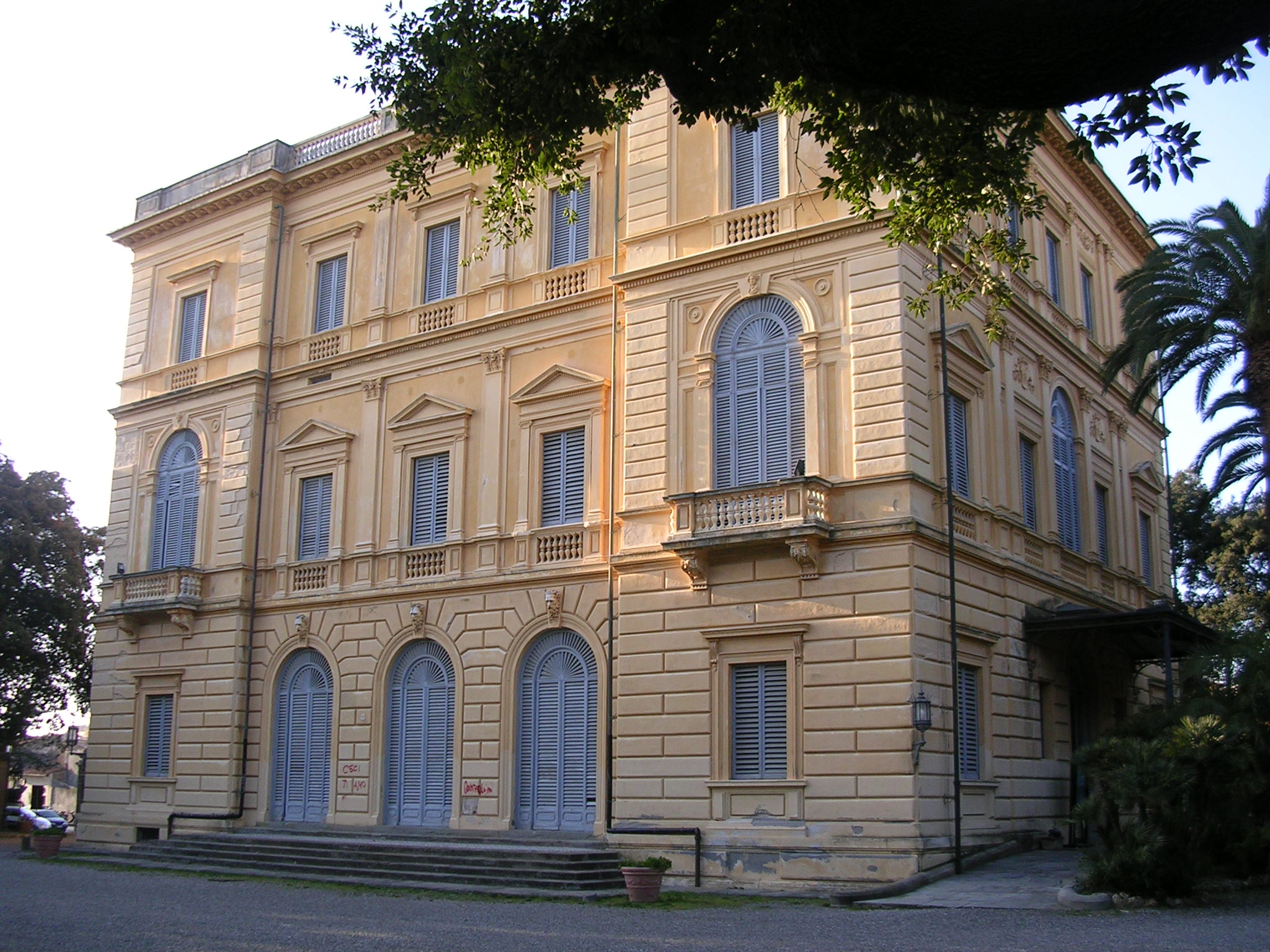
Museo Civico Giovanni Fattori, at the Villa Mimbelli, in Livorno

The Museo Civico Giovanni Fattori is the civic contemporary art museum of Livorno, located in Villa Mimbelli on Via San Jacopo in Acquaviva 65, a few blocks west of the Terraza Mascagni of Livorno, region of Tuscany, Italy.

The collection includes a number of works and biographical items associated with the native painter Giovanni Fattori, one of the leaders of the 19th-century group known as the Macchiaioli. To these works are added contemporary works of other Italian Macchiaioli and post-Macchiaioli painters.

== History ==
The origins of the museum date to 1877, when the municipal administration decide to establish an art gallery to reunite paintings by contemporary Italian artists such as Giovanni Fattori, Enrico Pollastrini and Cesare Bartolena. Subsequently, the art collection was enlarged with works by Raffaello Gambogi, Silvestro Lega, Guglielmo Micheli, and others.

Between the end of the 19th century and the early 20th century the collection was enriched with the acquisition of archaeological findings and a numismatic collection which was donated by Enrico Chiellini in 1893. Upon Fattori's death, in 1908, the museum purchased 250 drawings and 150 etchings from his authorship.

The new and larger museum headquarters in Piazza Guerrazzi was inaugurated in 1896. At the beginning of the 1930s, the museum was named after Giovanni Fattori.

During World War II, the museum's collection was moved out of the city. One large major work (The Exiles of Siena) by Enrico Pollastrini was however destroyed by the Allied bombardment. At the end of the conflict, part of its collection was placed on the second floor of Villa Fabbricotti and the rest was located in the various municipal offices and warehouses. At the same time the collection was enriched with works by Italian artists such as Plinio Nomellini, Guglielmo Micheli, Serafino De Tivoli, Oscar Ghiglia, and Ulvi Liegi. It was also purchases a cartoon attributed to Amedeo Modigliani.

In 1994 the museum, consisting partially of the collection, was moved to Villa Mimbelli, inaugurated in 1994 by the President of the Republic Oscar Luigi Scalfaro.

== Collections ==
The ground and first floors of the museum are adorned with decorations, furnishings and draperies of the 18th century style with frescoes by Annibale Gatti.

In these two floors are shown works by Enrico Pollastrini, Guglielmo Micheli, Ulvi Liegi, Oscar Ghiglia, Giovanni Bartolena, Leonetto Campiello and Mario Puccini. The main exhibition of the museum is at the second floor, where are displayed the paintings by Giovanni Fattori and other macchiaioli as Silvestro Lega, Telemaco Signorini, Vincenzo Cabianca, Giovanni Boldini, Adolfo Tommasi, Angiolo Tommasi and Ludovico Tommasi. In the other halls are the post-macchiaioli as Eugenio Cecconi, Vittorio Matteo Corcos and divisionism as Benvenuto Benvenuti and Plinio Nomellini. Giovanni Fattori was the main representative artist of the macchiaioli, some of his paintings exhibited are: Carica di Cavalleria a Montebello (1862), La Signora Martelli a Castiglioncello (1867), Assalto alla Madonna della Scoperta (1868), Giornata grigia (1893), Mandrie maremmane (1893), Lungomare ad Antignano (1894), Ritratto della terza moglie (1905).
