= Benvenuto Benvenuti =

Italian painter (1881–1959)

Benvenuto Benvenuti (October 5, 1881 – 1959) was an Italian painter, mainly of landscapes.

== Biography ==
He was born in Livorno and first trained under Lorenzo Cecchi at the School of Arts and Crafts of Livorno. He was influenced by the Macchiaioli landscape painter Adolfo Tommasi, who became his close friend. Benvenuto began exhibiting as a 15-year-old in 1896. During the next decade, he was able to meet or be influenced by Lloyd, Fattori, and Signorini. In 1900 he began to experiment with Divisionism, influenced by Vittore Grubicy, with whom he became close friends.

In 1901–2, he exhibited Cavallo alla mangiatoia and Trittico di Suese. He moved to Milan where he met Pellizza da Volpedo and Morbelli. In 1907 he exhibited landscapes of Livorno at the Italian Divisionist Exposition, organized at the Grubicy Gallery in Paris, and in 1909 participated in the Paris Salon d'Automme with his fellow Tuscans, Lloyd and Plinio Nomellini.

In 1911 he exhibited at the Mostra di Arte Libera in Milan. In 1914, with his friends Raffaello Gambogi and Puccini, he formed part of the 83rd Esposition of the Società Amatori e Cultori of Rome. He was briefly imprisoned in Germany during the First World War. In 1921, back in Livorno, he exhibited at the First Biennale Romana along with Ulvi Liegi, Lloyd, and Nomellini. Benvenuti, along with other artists, frequented the local Caffè Bardi. In 1922 and 1923, he exhibited at a Livorno Expositions of the Gruppo Labronico. Throughout the 1920s, Benvenuti created graphic designs and lithography for journals and posters. By 1932, a leg ailment caused him to have an amputation.

In 1935, the Galleria Scopinich of Milan exhibited Benvenuti's L'idea e la luce', citing in the notes of the exhibit that it was "in reverent tribute to two great spirits elect: Victor Grubicy and Angelo Conti, My Perfect Masters".

Benvenuti spent World War II in Lucca, exhibiting with other members of the "Gruppo Labronico" (1945, Galleria Tallone, Milan; 1948, Casa Dante, Florence). Increasing blindness interrupted his work painting landscapes in the 1950s. He died in Livorno in 1959.
