= Alfredo Müller =

Franco-Italian painter (1869–1939)

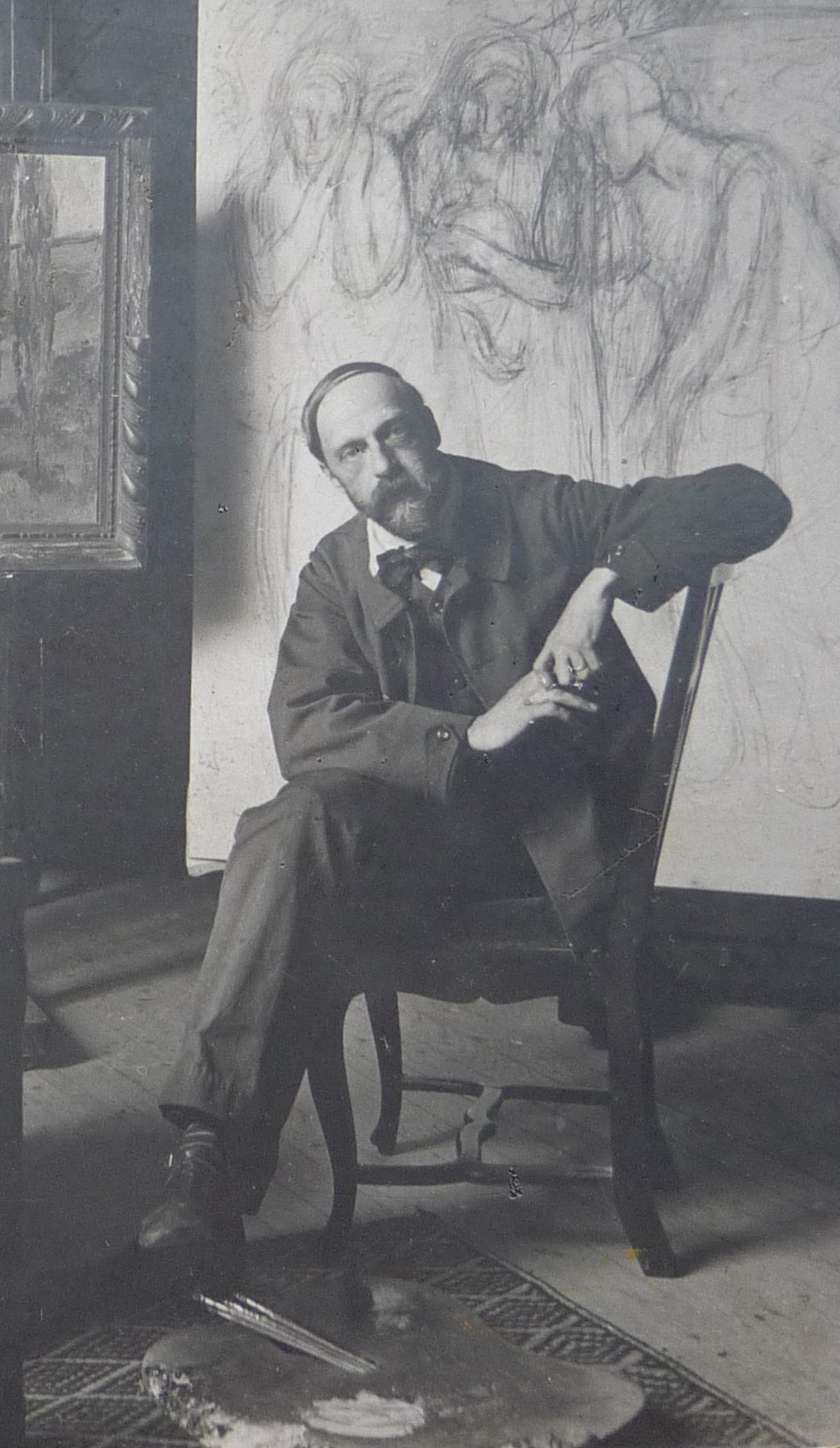
Müller in his studio in Paris (73, Rue Coulaincourt) in 1908

Alfredo Müller (June 30, 1869 – February 7, 1939) was a Franco-Italian painter and printmaker of Swiss nationality. As a painter from Livorno, he might have belonged to the group of the Postmacchiaioli, together with Mario Puccini, Oscar Ghiglia, Plinio Nomellini, Ulvi Liegi, Giovanni Bartolena, and others, but he is a disciple of the Florentine portraitist Michele Gordigiani. As a French engraver, he was close to Francis Jourdain, Manuel Robbe, Richard Ranft, Eugène Delâtre, Théophile Steinlen.

== Biography ==
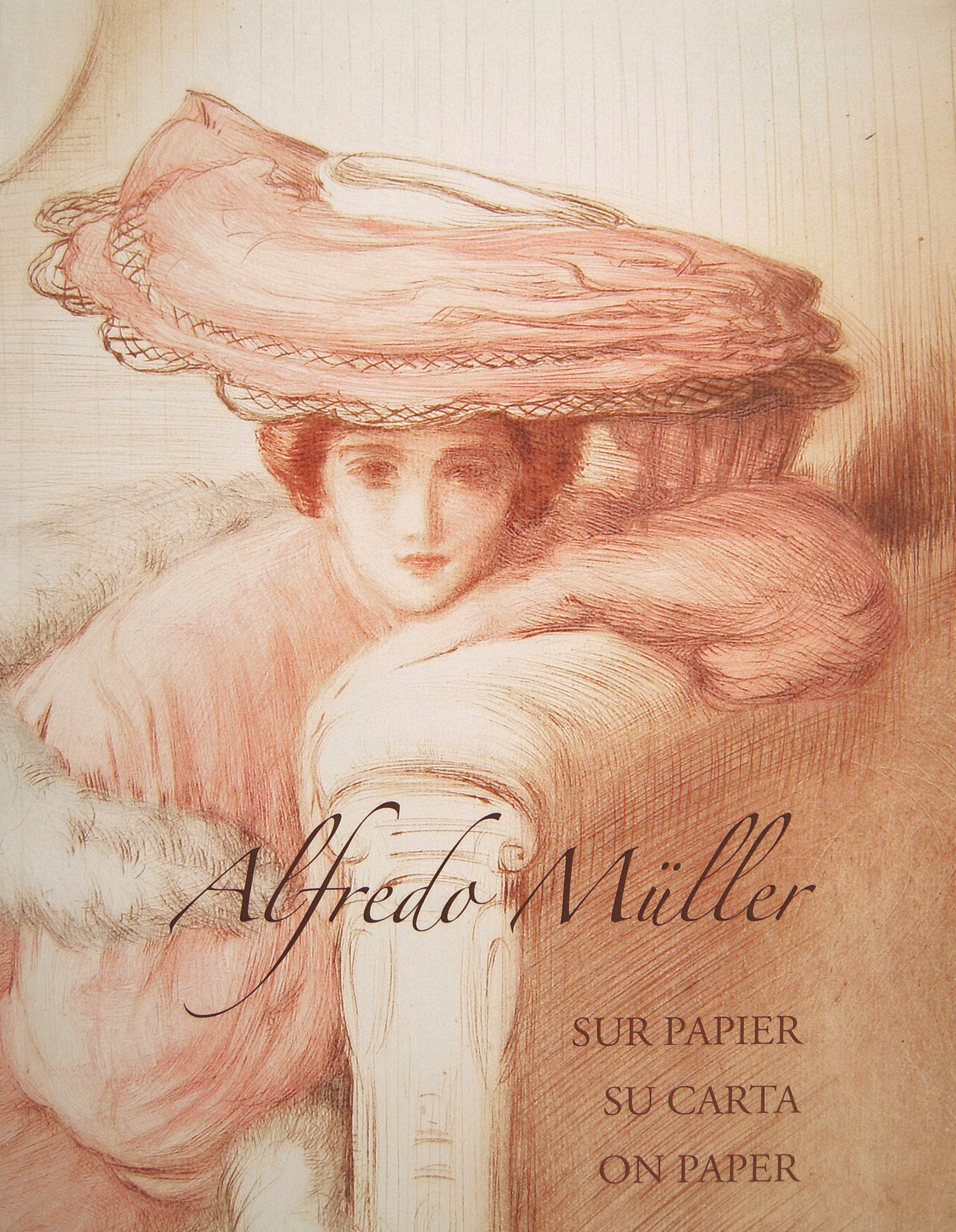
Cover page of Alfredo Müller. Sur papier. Su carta. On Paper, Complete Catalogue of the graphic work of Alfredo Müller (1869-1939) in three languages, Hélène Koehl ed., published in 2014

Müller was born in Livorno to a wealthy Swiss family involved in the international cotton and coffee trades. At the age of 15, he began studying art in Florence with the masters Giuseppe Ciaranfi and Michele Gordigiani of the Academy of Fine Arts. There he became friends for life with Edoardo Gordigiani, the son of Michele, and Egisto Fabbri, a Tuscan-American.

In 1886, as a young painter, he participated in the First Exhibition of Fine Arts of Livorno, together with established painters such as Giovanni Fattori and Silvestro Lega.

In 1889, he exhibited two of his paintings at the Universal Exhibition in Paris, where he discovered Impressionism. This moment represented a turning point in the career of the young painter, as he was always concerned with colors and vibrations of light. After his return to Tuscany, his paintings, which now reflected the influence of Impressionism, sparked debate for their overly French character.

At the same moment, the failure of the Bank of Livorno provoked the ruin of his father's house, and a few years later Müller emigrated to Paris, eventually settling in Montmartre. He made friends in the social circle of artists, writers and musicians, becoming acquainted in particular with Renoir, but also with Pissarro and Cézanne, whom he considered his master, and became a well-known etcher in colours. Among his Italian friends in Paris, we find his relative Leonetto Cappiello and Libero Andreotti.

In 1914, he was in Rome with Marguerite, whom he married in 1908. In Rome he exhibited 12 paintings at the Second Secession. Because of the war, he moved to Florence initially for a short while but he ended up staying for 18 years. The couple found a little house in the hills overlooking Florence, at Settignano. Müller painted frequently, always working on the movement of light. A great part of his work in this period was dedicated to decorative arts, in which he could express his fascination for theater and its magic. After the political situation worsened, he returned to France in 1932 where he spent his last years. He died in Paris in 1939.

He is the elder brother of the cycling champion Rodolfo Müller, who ran the first Tour de France (arrived 4th) and the brother in law of the American cycling-champion and pace-maker Gus Lawson who married his younger sister Marie. He descends from Lewis Evans (surveyor), geographer and close friend of Benjamin Franklin, whose daughter Amelia (Philadelphia 1744- Hythe (Southampton, 1835), married to the Irish sea Captain David Barry, was the great-grandmother of Alfredo's grandfather Charles Eugène Schintz, surgeon in Livorno.

Alfredo Müller. Sur papier. Su carta. On Paper, Complete Catalogue of the Graphic Work has been published end of 2014 by Les Amis d'Alfredo Müller. Based on wide researches, this large publication lets for the first time overview the life of the artist and the coherence of his art. It gives complete notes for more than two hundred engravings all created in Paris between 1896 and 1906 and about one hundred drawings. The Complete Catalogue of the Painted Work is in preparation.

Work - selection

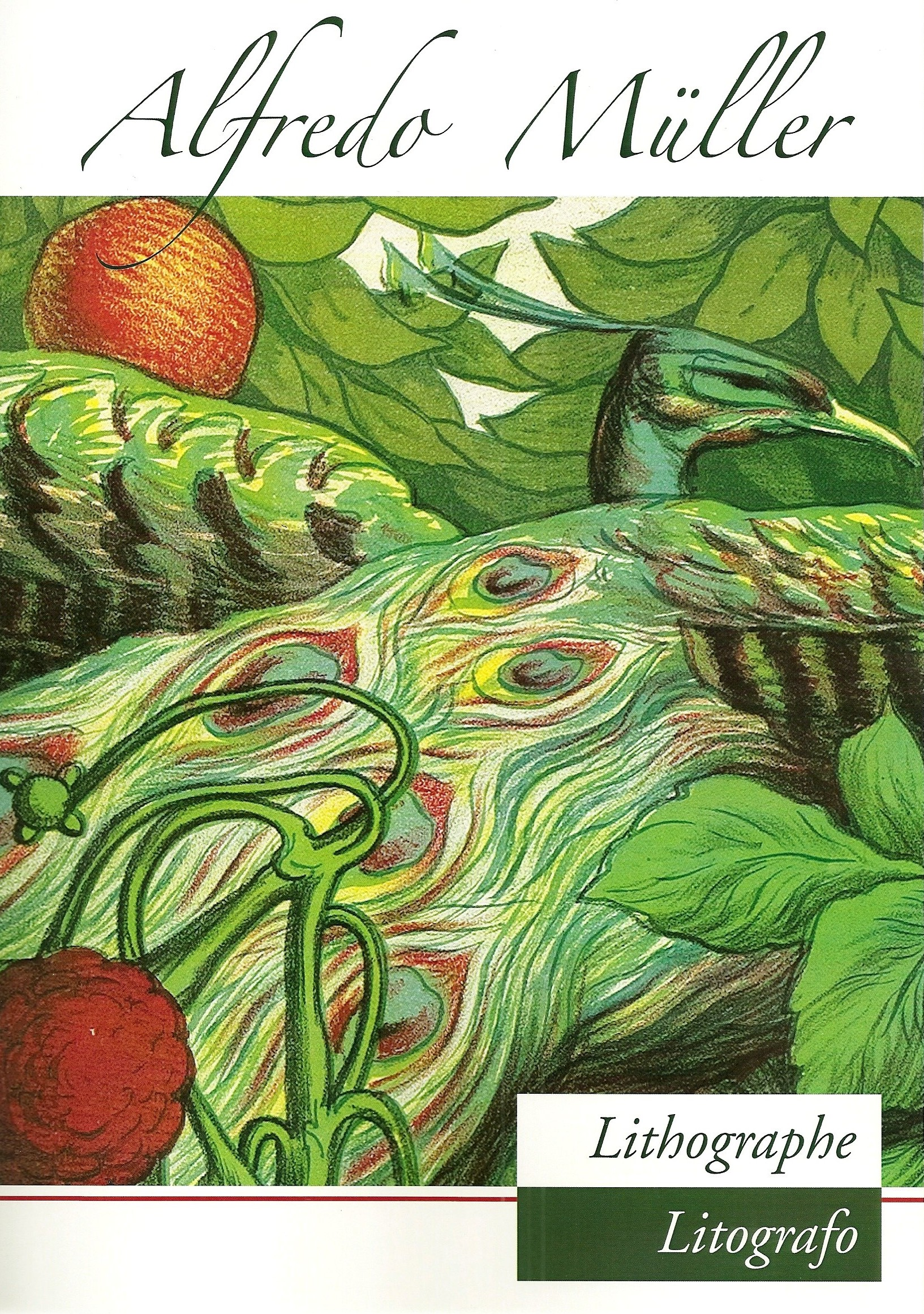
Cover page of the catalogue of the lihographs by Alfredo Müller (1869-1939), published in 2012

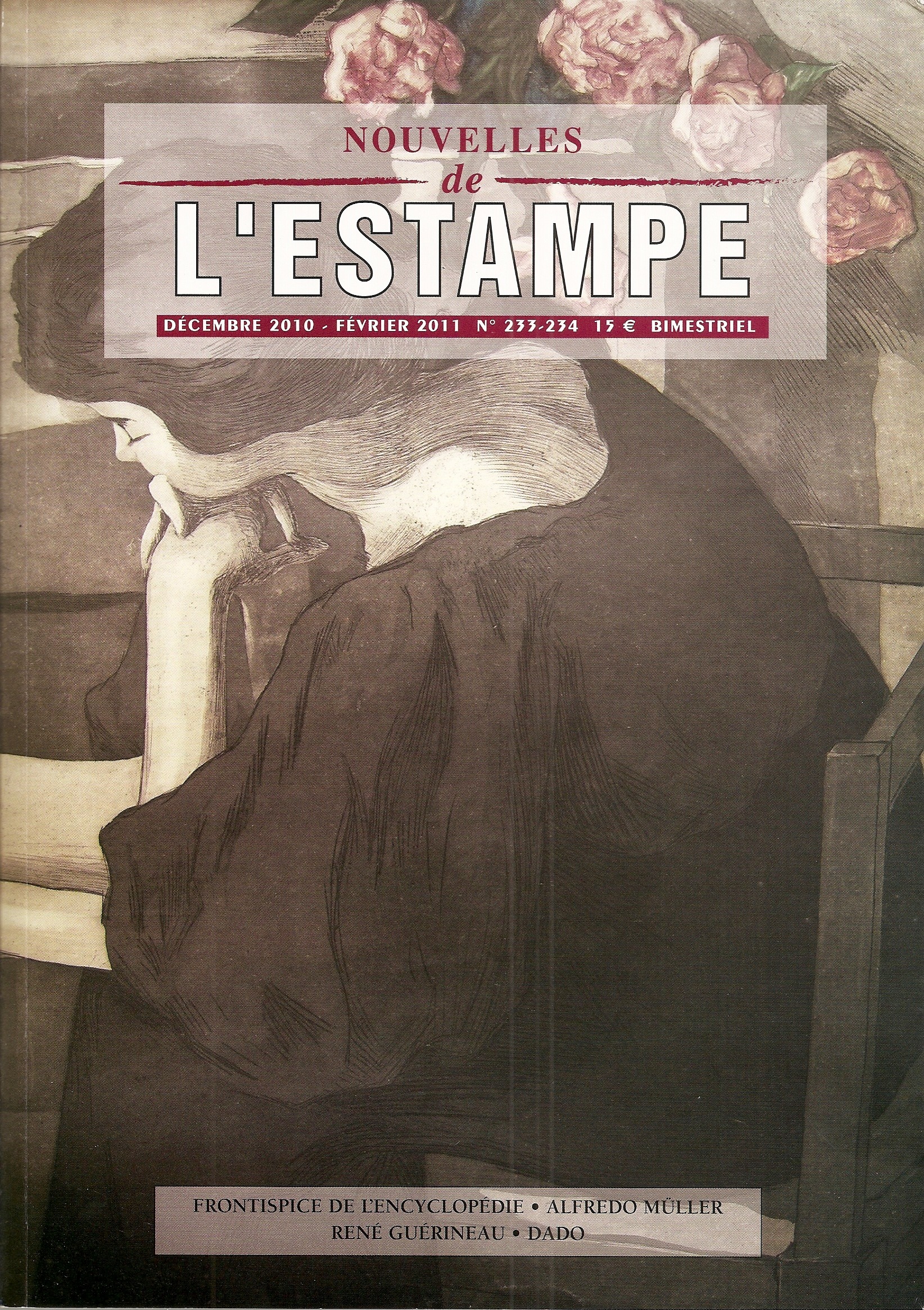
Cover page of Nouvelles de l'estampe n. 233-234 (mars 2011) with Alfredo Müller, "Femme lisant aux fleurs". 1897. Etching in colours 64,3 x 51,7 cm. Exh. Vollard 1898. BnF, département des Estampes. Koehl E44

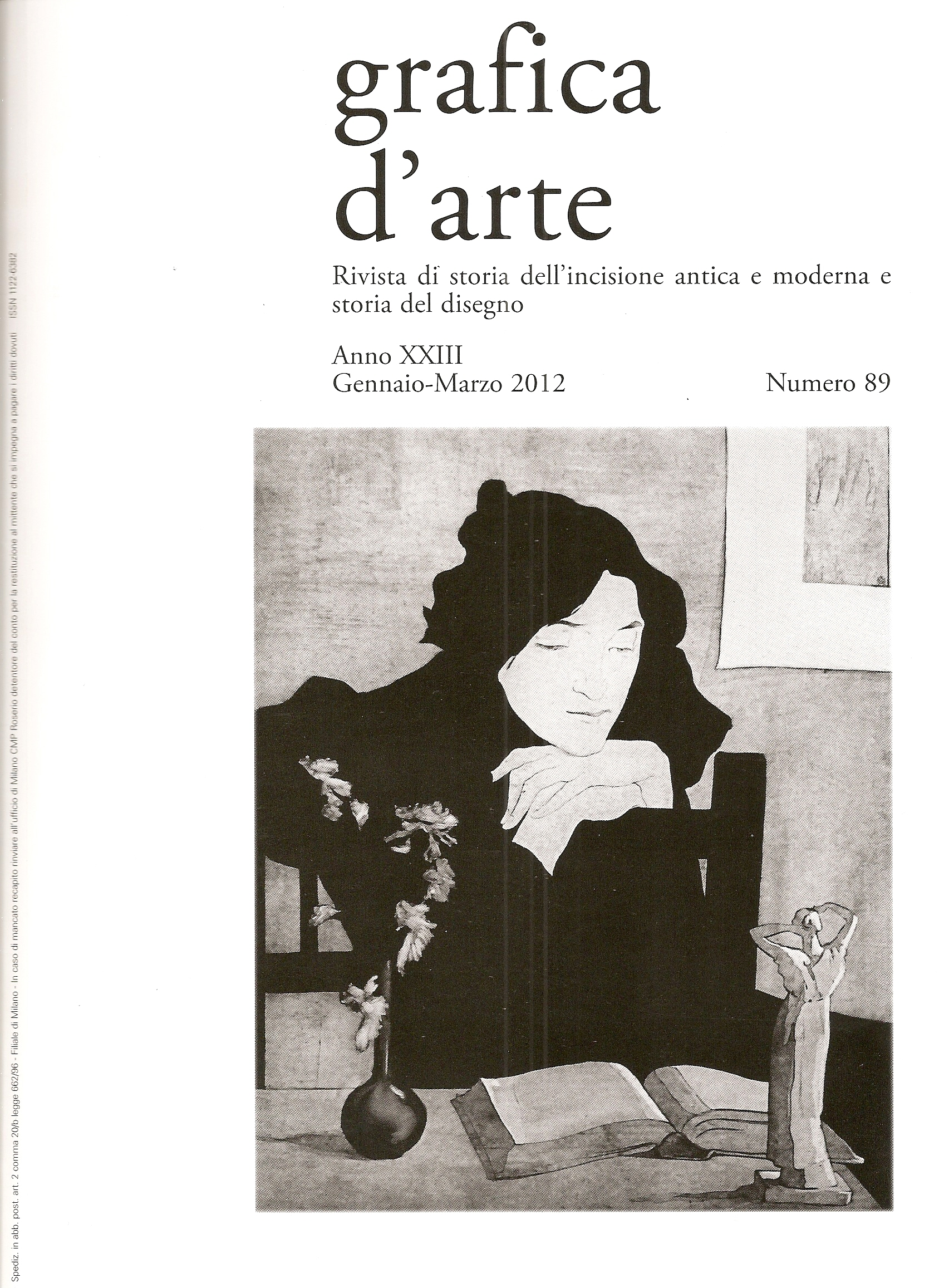
Cover page of Grafica d'Arte n. 89, January–March 2012, with "La Jeune femme au Tanagra". 1897, etching in colours 64 x 52 cm. Exh. Vollard 1898. BnF, département des Estampes. Koehl, E42

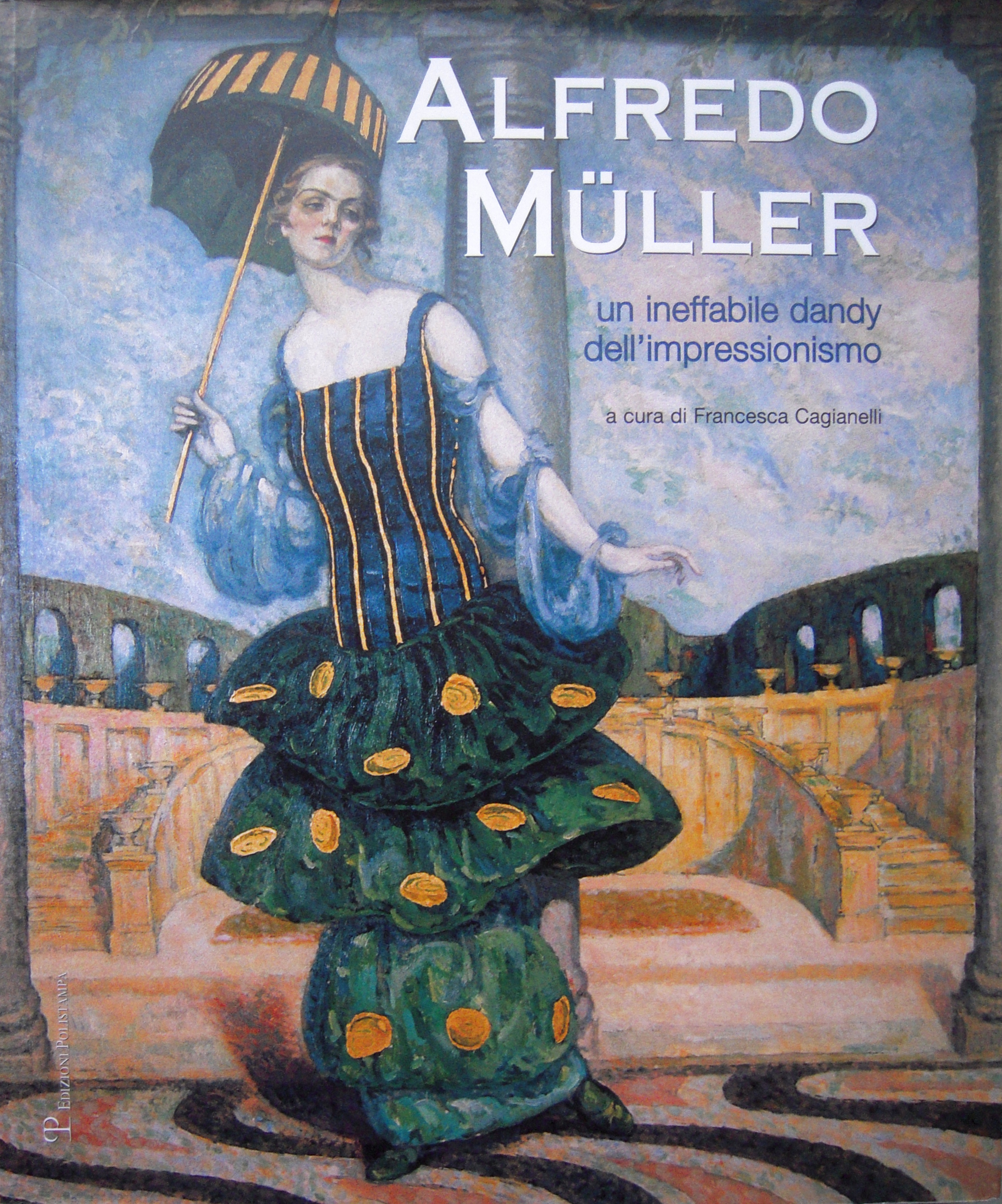
Cover page of Alfredo Müller. Un ineffabile dandy dell'impressionismo, a cura di Francesca Cagianelli, Firenze, Polistampa 2011. Featuring Alfredo Müller, "Ritratto di Cora Antinori". 1916. Oil on canvas 244,5 x 188 cm

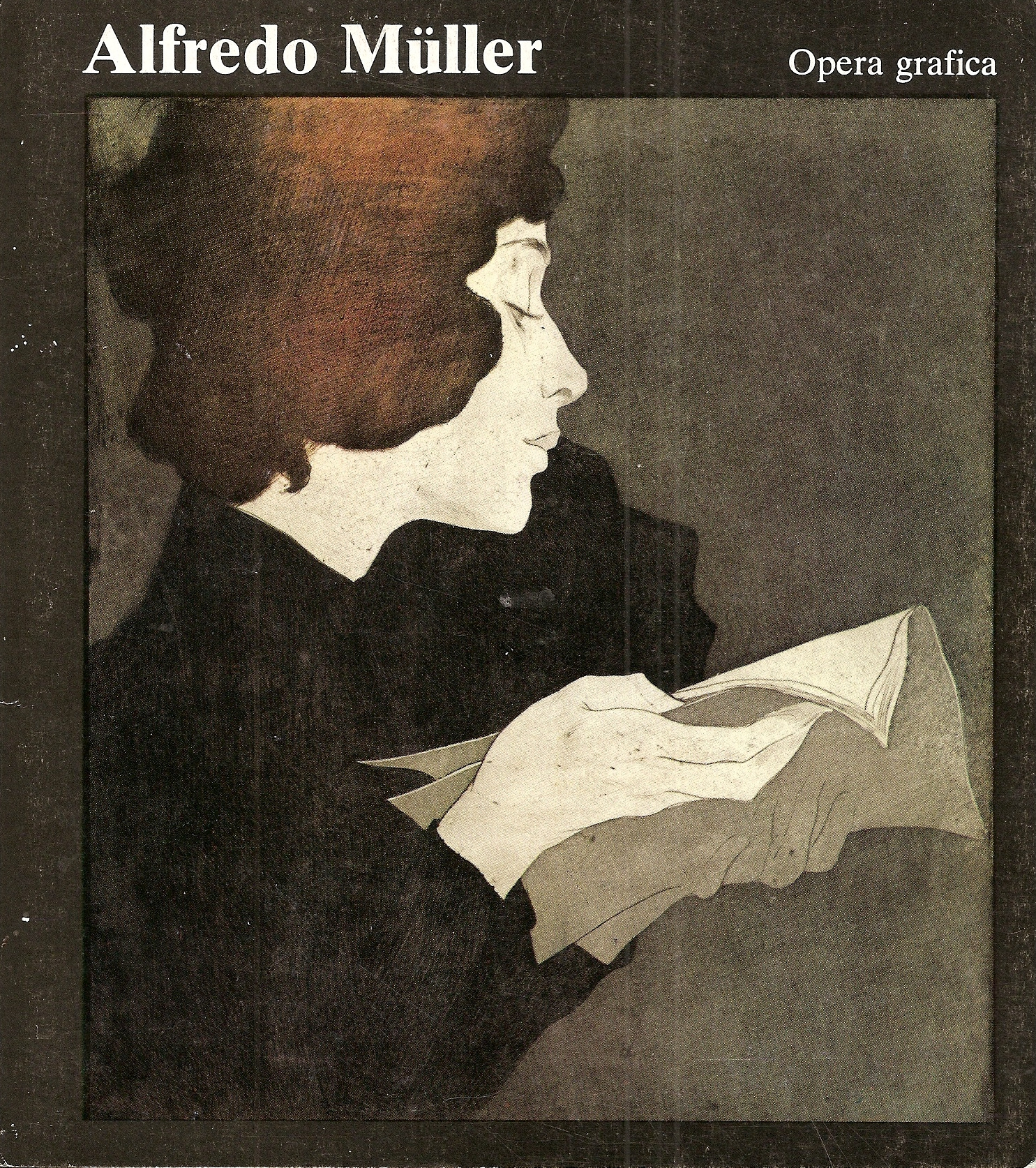
Cover page of Alfredo Müller. Opera grafica. Livorno 1982, featuring "La Liseuse" 1899, etching 35,5 x 31,5 cm created for "Cocorico"

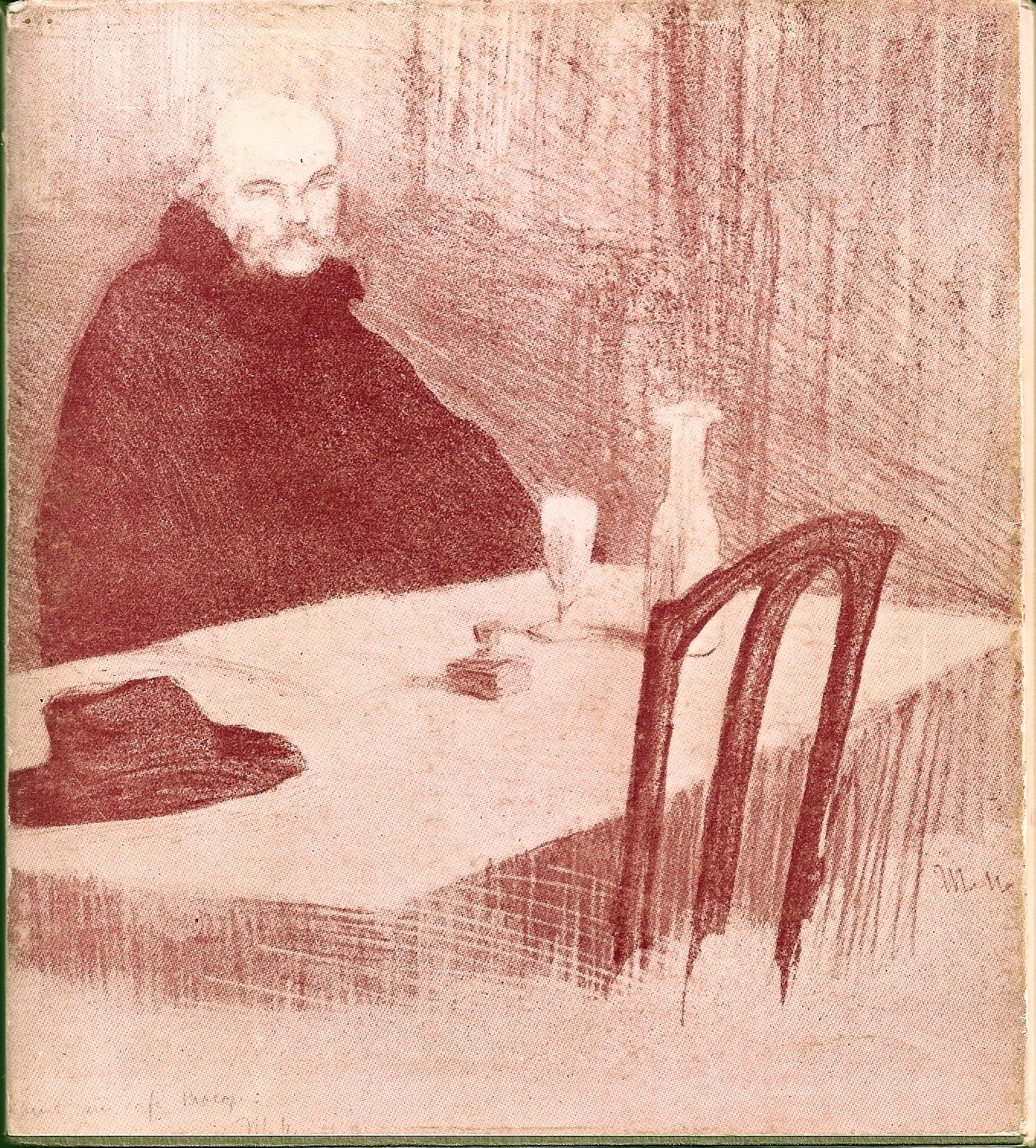
Cover page of Omaggio an Alfredo Müller, Firenze, Il Mirteto 1974 featuring "Verlaine au café Procope" 1896, lithograph 45 x 50 cm
