= Mario Borgiotti =

Italian painter (1906–1977)

- Born: 22 August 1906; Livorno, Italy
- Died: 19 December 1977; Firenze
- Known for: Painting, art collector
- Movement: Post Macchiaolo

Mario Borgiotti (22 August 1906 – 19 December 1977) was an Italian painter and art collector.

== Biography ==
Mario Borgiotti was born to a working class family and originally studied violin. In the 1920s he met Ulvi Liegi, Gino Romiti, Umberto Vittorini, as well as other members of the Gruppo Labronico and became involved in the trade and collection of works of art.

In 1925, Borgiotti organised an exhibition of contemporary art in Pisa which included a large number of Gruppo Labronico painters and in 1927, a combined exhibition of nineteenth-century works and art from Livorno.

In 1928, he promoted an exhibition and sale of works by Macchiaioli at the Bottega d'Arte Calligani in Lucca, while in 1930 he organised another collective exhibition of Gruppo Labronico and nineteenth-century Italian paintings in Viareggio.

He began his apprenticeship as a painter with maestro Giovanni March in the same year, and in 1934 his work was exhibited for the first time at the seventh provincial exhibition of Livorno. His work as a portraitist sees Pietro Mascagni, Giovanni Bartolena, Ulvi Liegi and Piero Vaccari immortalised in his paintings. In 1938, Borgiotti moved to Florence where he organised an exhibition of nineteenth-century art, and in 1946, the Galleria D'Arte Livorno exhibited 46 of his works.

Borgiotti joined the Gruppo Labronico in 1953 becoming president in 1967, a position he held for over a decade. In 1953, he founded, along with Nedo Luschi and Renzo Casali, the Premio Rotonda, a prize painting contest at the Rotonda of Ardenza.

In 1955, he moved to Milan, continuing his artistic career in a studio at Palazzo Gallarati Scotti in Via Manzoni, then, in 1961, Borgiotti organised the Premio Spalletta, alongside Renato Natali, Bruno Miniati and Aldo Santini in Livorno.

In 1963, he was a curator of a Macchiaoli exhibition at Il Grattacielo (English: The Skyscraper) art centre in Livorno. The exhibition moved to Montecatini Terme and from here to the United States.

The commune of Livorno dedicated a bust to Borgiotti in the park of Villa Fabbricotti.
