= Manlio Martinelli =

Italian painter

Manlio Martinelli (1884–1974) was an Italian painter active in Livorno.

== Biography ==
He was born in Livorno, and trained under Guglielmo Micheli, along with Gino Romiti, Llewelyn Lloyd, Amedeo Modigliani, and Aristide Sommati. He was a member of the Gruppo Labronico of painters that met in the Caffè Bardi.

He differed from the Macchiaioli schools who had portrayed landscapes and scenery in naturalistic light; his themes were intimate and centered on people: often portraits, but could be iconic scenes of mothers and children or just toddlers. His colors were bright, with solid blocks, more expressionist than divisionist. A retrospective was held at the Pinacoteca Carlo Servolini of Collesalvetti in 2010, titled Manlio Martinelli 1884-1974 Un amico di Modigliani alla Scuola di Guglielmo Micheli, curated by Francesca Cagianelli.

== Works ==
- Portrait of signora Rosselli, exhibited at XXI Biennale Veneziana, and won prize of the Province in the Florentine exhibition
- Portrait in white
- Self-portrait, Pinacoteca di Livorno
- Le monache
- Alla musica
- Triste anniversario
- Gli orfanelli
- La notte, exhibited at Turin
- Le maschere
- La vendemmia
- I fascinai
