= Vittorio Matteo Corcos =

Italian painter (1859–1933)

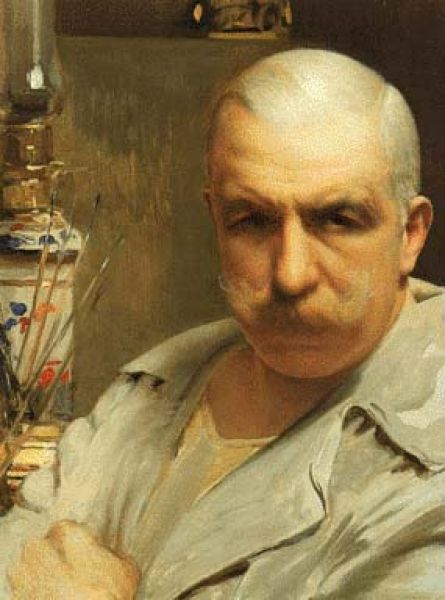
Self-portrait (1913)

Vittorio Matteo Corcos (4 October 1859 – 8 November 1933) was an Italian painter, known for his portraits. Many of his genre works depict winsome and finely dressed young men and women, in moments of repose and recreation.

== Biography ==
He was born to Jewish parents, Isacco and Giuditta Baquis, in Livorno. He trained at the Academy of Fine Arts of Florence under Enrico Pollastrini. Between 1878 and 1879 he worked under Domenico Morelli in Naples.

He then traveled to Paris where he met Léon Bonnat, and signed a contract with the Goupil & Cie, he was able to supplement his income as a portrait painter with illustrations for magazines. He frequented the circles of Giuseppe De Nittis. Between 1881 and 1886, he frequently exhibited at the Salon.

He returned to Italy in 1886, putatively to join the army, and settled in Florence. He converted to Catholicism and married a widow, Emma Ciabatti. In Florence, he made friends in the intellectual circles, and made portraits of Silvestro Lega, Giosue Carducci, and Pietro Mascagni. After 1900, he wrote for the Florentine Journal Il Marzocco. He also published a short story in the magazine Fanfulla della Domenica titled Mademoiselle Leprince. In 1904, he traveled to Potsdam to paint Emperor William II and other members of the German monarchy. During World War I, his son died in battle in 1916. In the 1920s he joined the Gruppo Labronico along with Plinio Nomellini and Ulvi Liegi.

He also painted portraits of Mussolini (1928), Countess Annina Morosini, Countess Nerina Volpi di Misurata, Giosuè Carducci, Giacomo Puccini, Pietro Mascagni, and Queen Amélie of Portugal, Princess of Orleans;

In 1913, his self-portrait was accepted by the Uffizi museum.

He died in Florence in 1933.

== Selected paintings ==
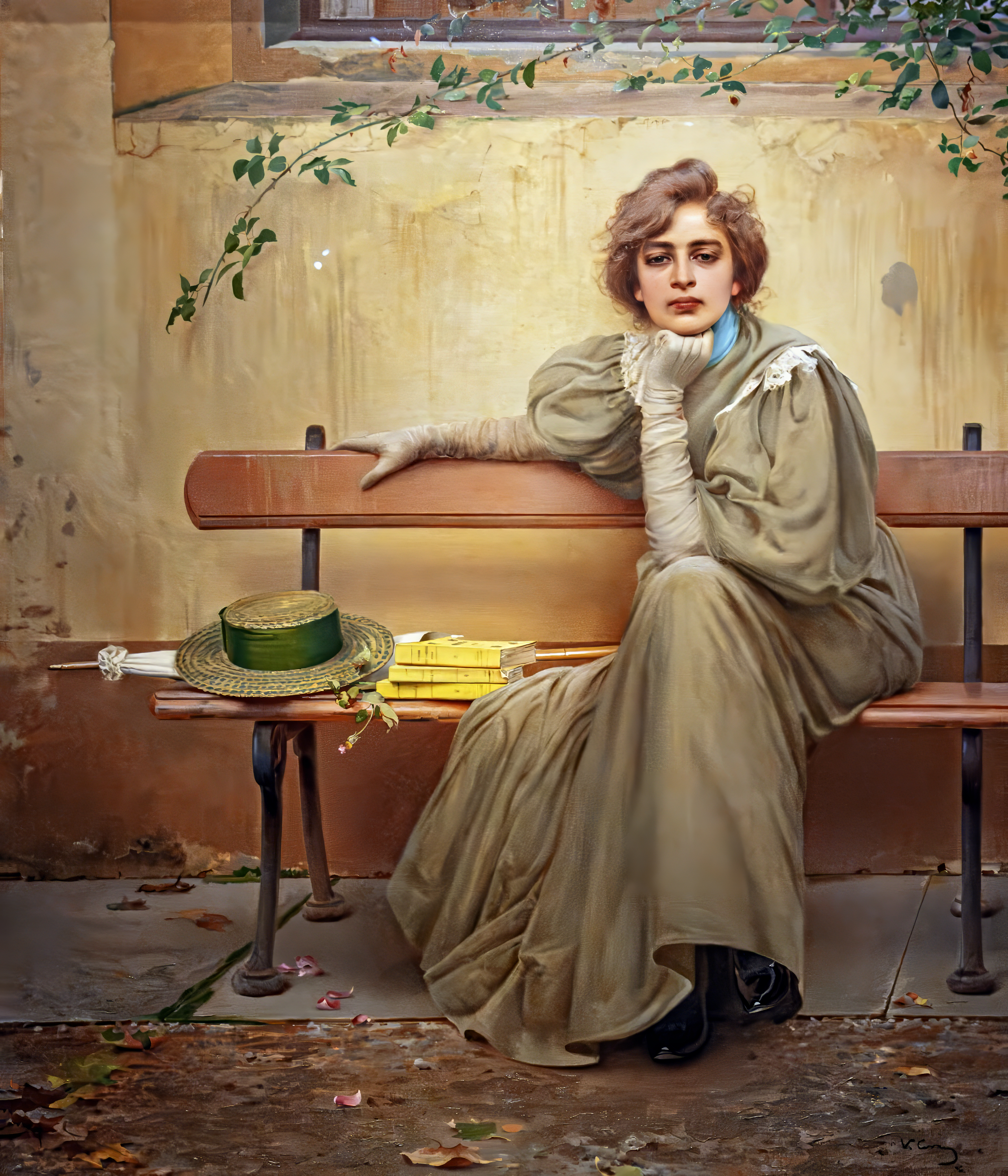
Dreams, 1896

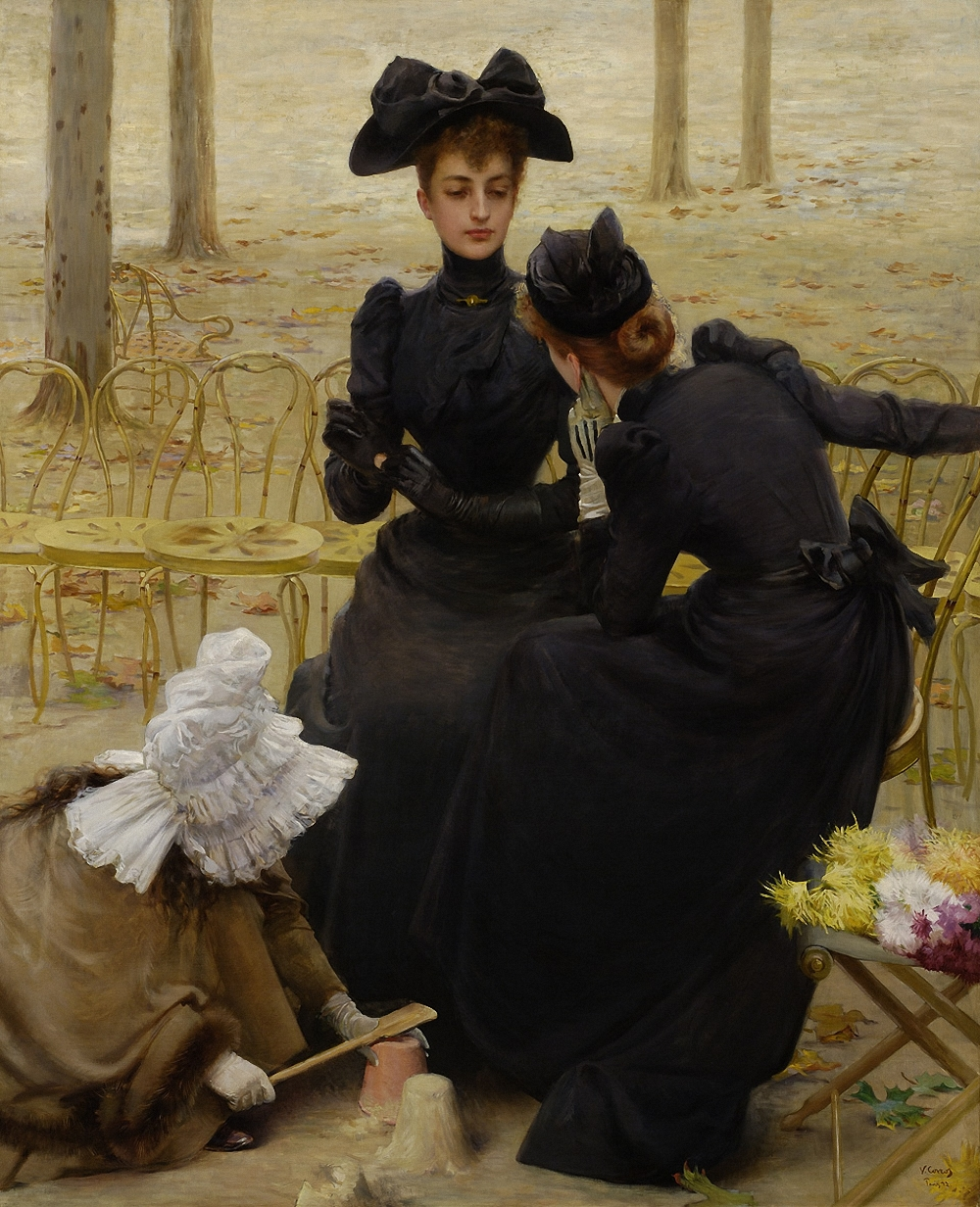
Conversation in the
Jardin du Luxembourg

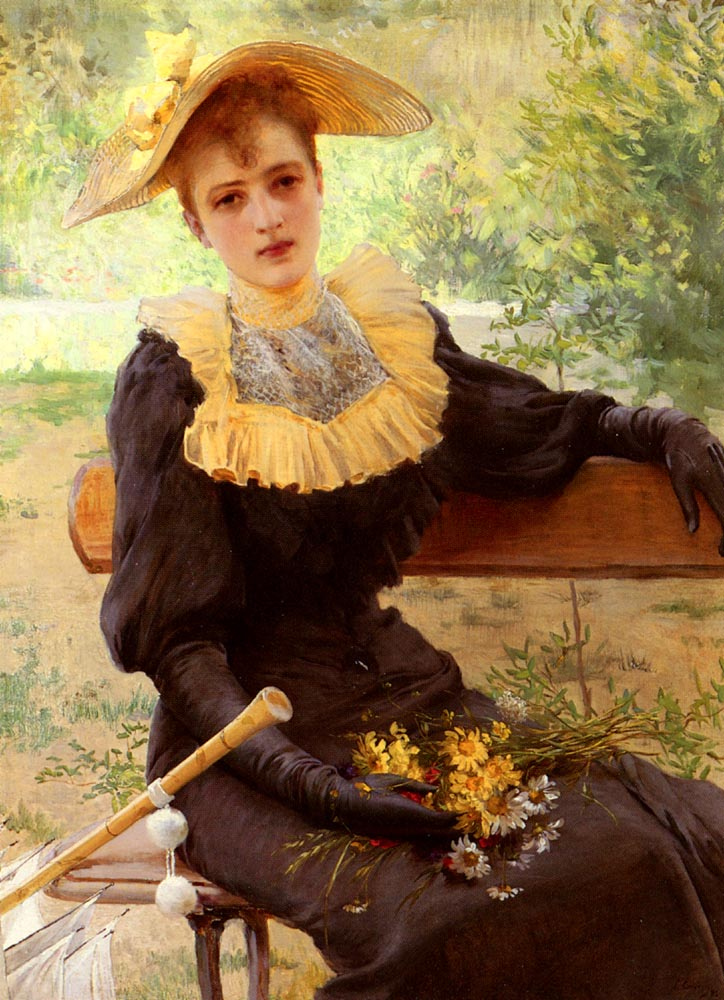
In The Garden

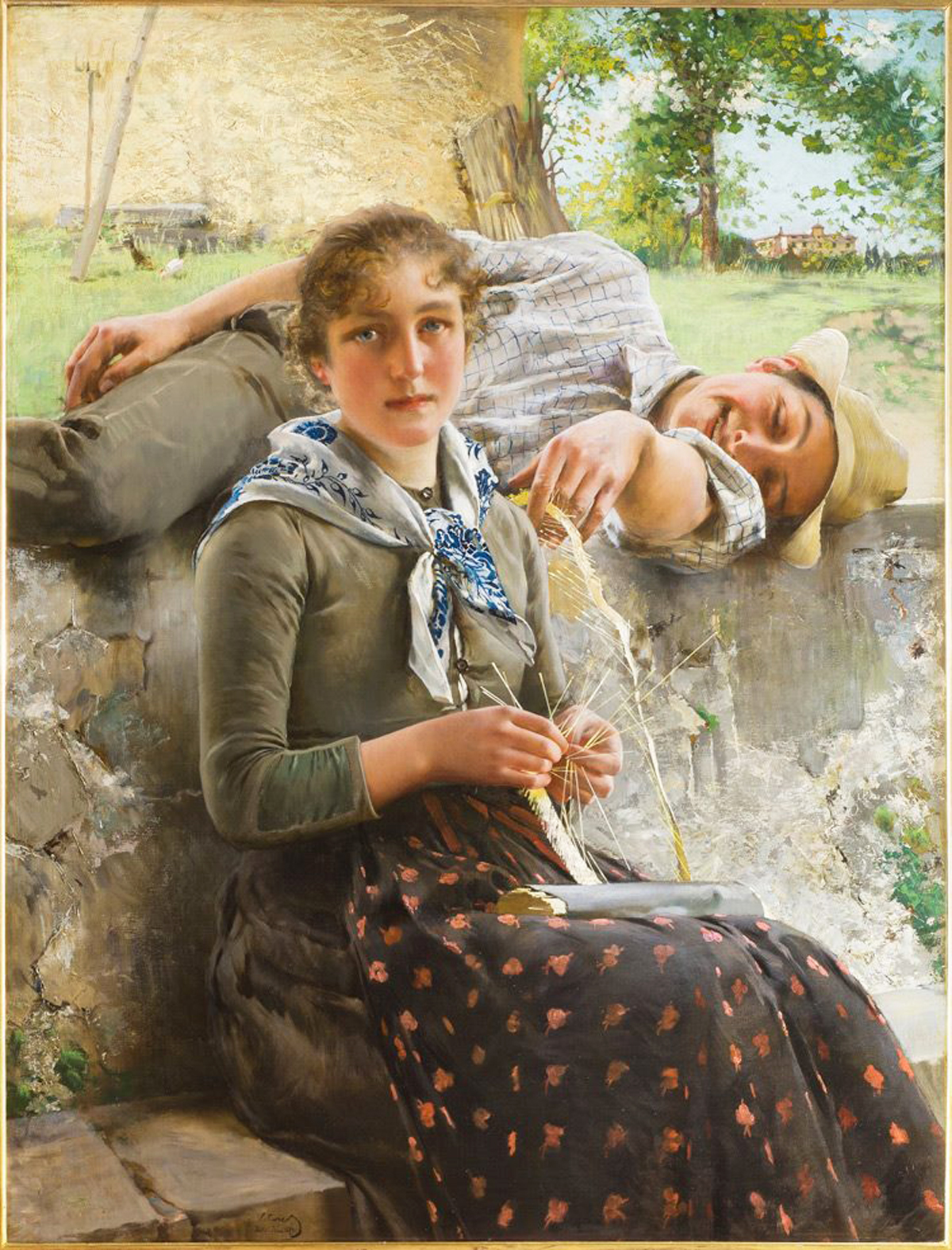
Stella and Piero, 1889

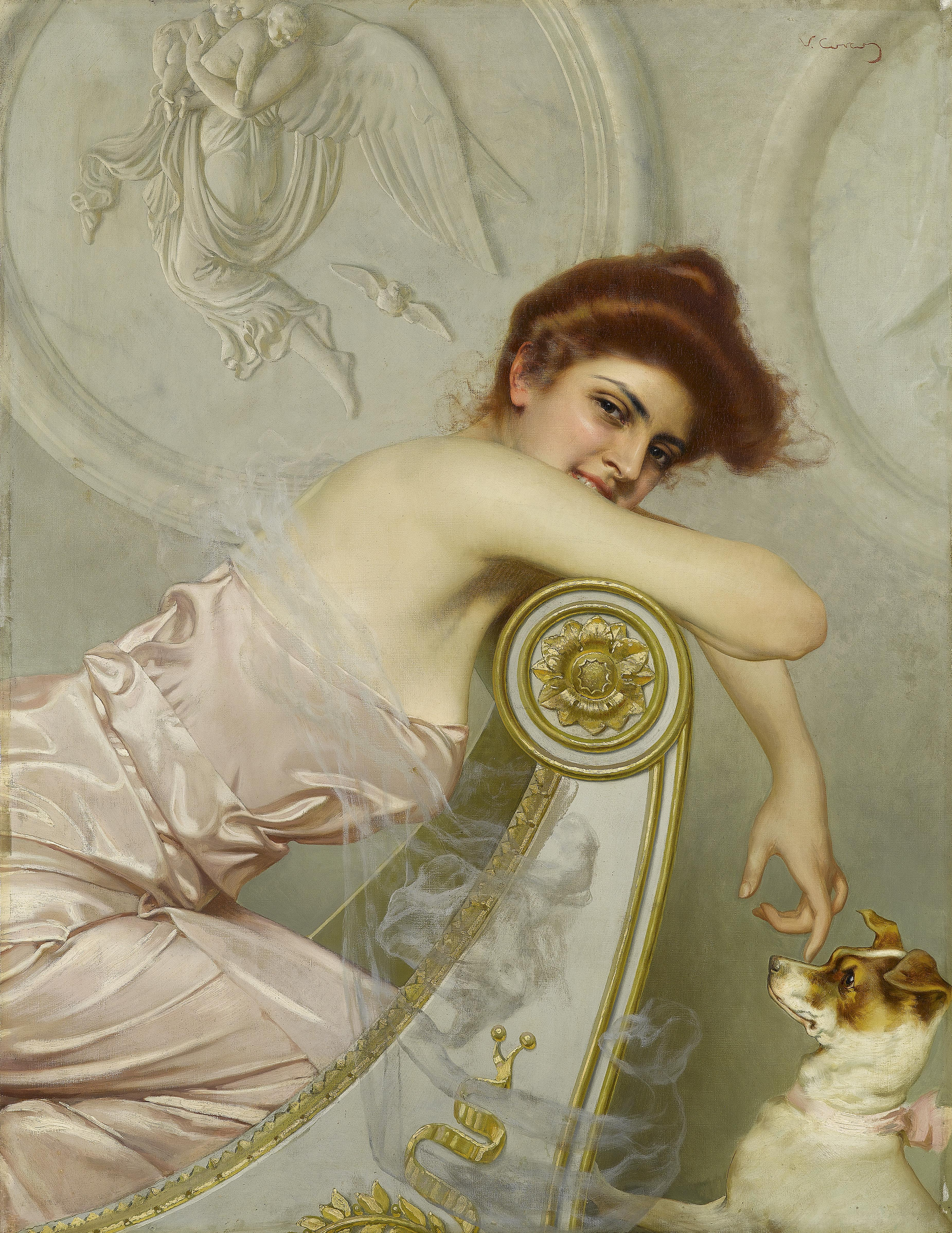
Young Woman
with a little dog

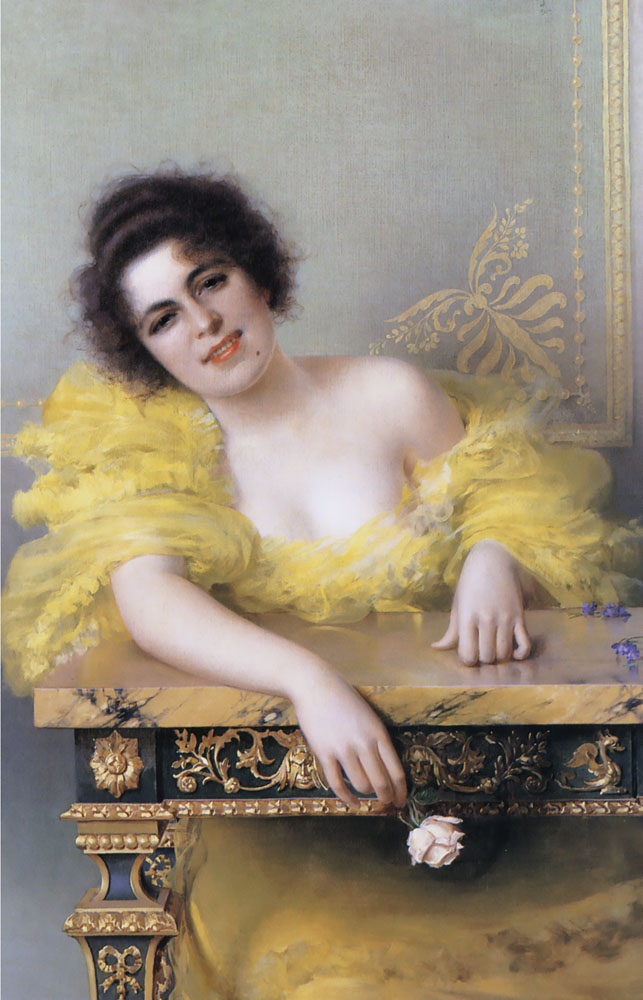
Portrait of a
Young Woman

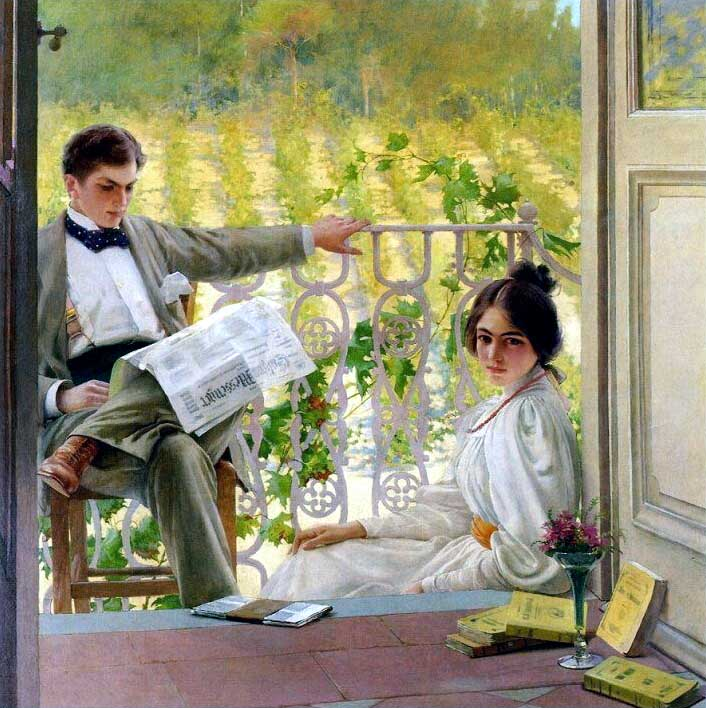
Afternoon on the Terrace

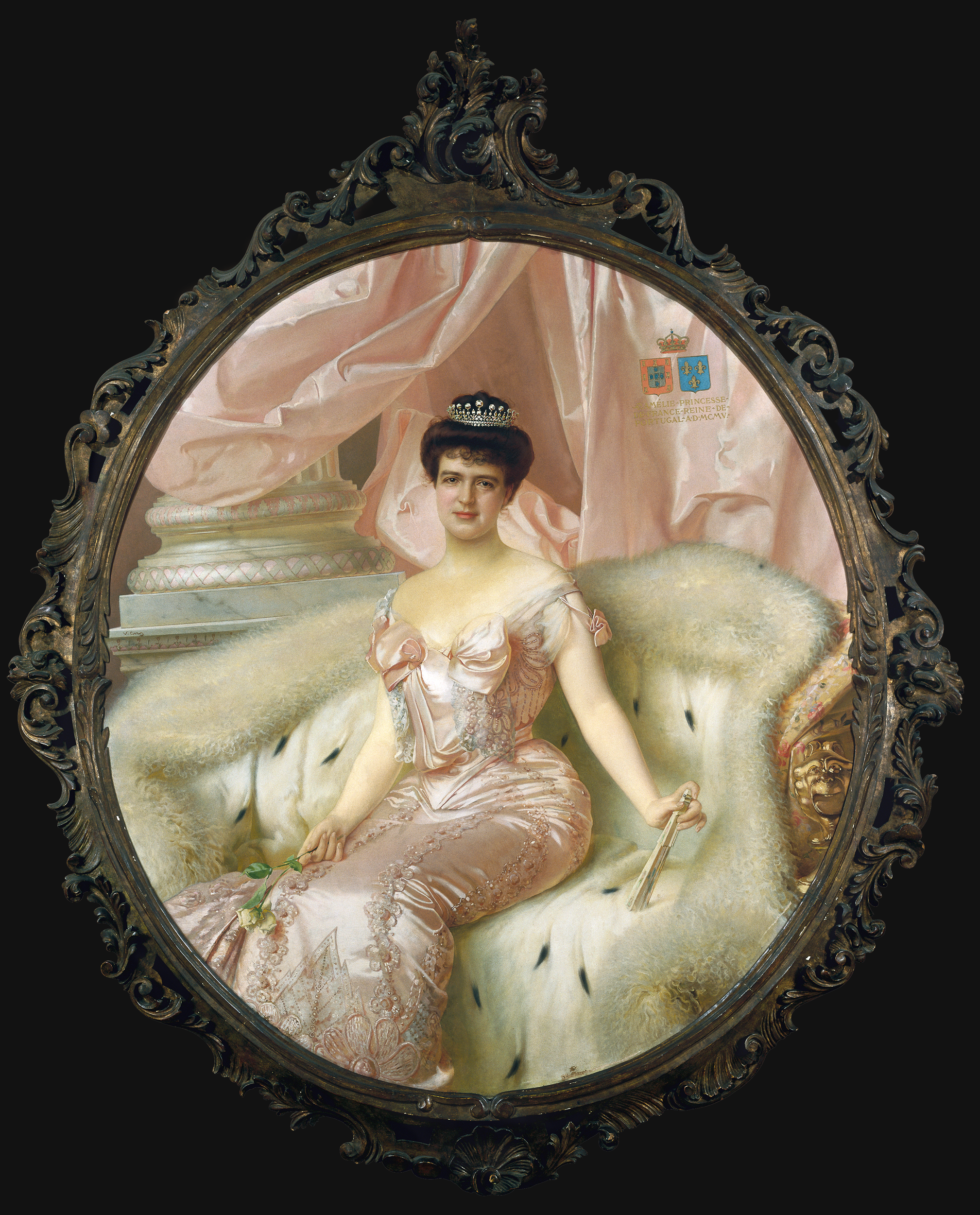
Portrait of Amélie of Orléans, Queen of Portugal, 1905

== Collections ==
- Sogni, 1896, Galleria Nazionale d'Arte Moderna, Rome
- Portrait d'Amélie d'Orléans, 1905, National Coach Museum
- Self portrait : Uffizi

== Bibliography ==
- Carlo Sisi : Vittorio Corcos : il fantasma e il fiore : [mostra, Livorno, Museo Civico "G. Fattori", 26 giugno - 7 settembre 1997, Firenze, Galleria d'arte moderna, Palazzo Pitti, 16 settembre-12 ottobre 1997], Firenze : EDIFIR, 1997, (ISBN 978-88797-0054-2)
- Ilaria Taddei, Fernando Mazzocca, Carlo Sisi: Corcos: i sogni della Belle Époque, Marsilio, 2014 (ISBN 978-88317-1749-6).
