= Michelozzi =

Michelozzi is an Italian surname. Notable people with the surname include:

- Michelozzo Michelozzi (c. 1396 – 1472), Italian architect and sculptor
- Corrado Michelozzi (1883 – 1965), Italian painter

== See also ==
- Micheluzzi, another Italian surname
