= Luigi Levi =

Luigi Levi may refer to:

- Gino Levi-Montalcini (born Luigi Levi; 1902–1974), Italian architect and designer
- Ulvi Liegi (born Luigi Mosè Levi; 1858–1939), Italian painter and printmaker

== See also ==
- Luigi (given name)
- Levi (surname)
