= Guglielmo Micheli =

Italian painter (1866–1926)

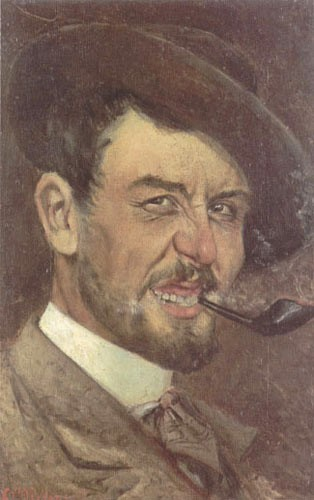
Self-Portrait (1890s), at the Museo Fattoriano of Livorno

Guglielmo Micheli (October 12, 1866 – September 7, 1926) was an Italian painter. Micheli's work consisted mainly of landscapes and seascapes using oils and watercolors.

== Biography ==
Micheli was born in Livorno. He was awarded a stipend named in honor of artist Michelangelo Bastoni, allowing him to enroll at the Academy of Fine Arts of Florence, where he was a pupil of Natale Betti. The school was then directed by Giovanni Fattori. He frequently wrote to Giuseppe Pellizza da Volpedo, who had been a fellow student at the academy, along with Plinio Nomellini, Mario Puccini, Francesco Fanelli, and Ferruccio Pagni. Influenced by Volpedo and others, Micheli initially painted in a style recalling the Macchiaioli painters, before developing his own style. He also made engravings and designed illustrations for books.

In 1888, he married Guglielmina Paganucci, granddaughter of the prominent sculptor of Livorno, Giovanni Paganucci.

His most prominent pupil was Amedeo Modigliani. Among his other pupils were Llewelyn Lloyd, Giulio Cesare Vinzio, Manlio Martinelli, Gino Romiti, Renato Natali and occasionally Oscar Ghiglia (painter).

Micheli died in Livorno on September 7, 1926.

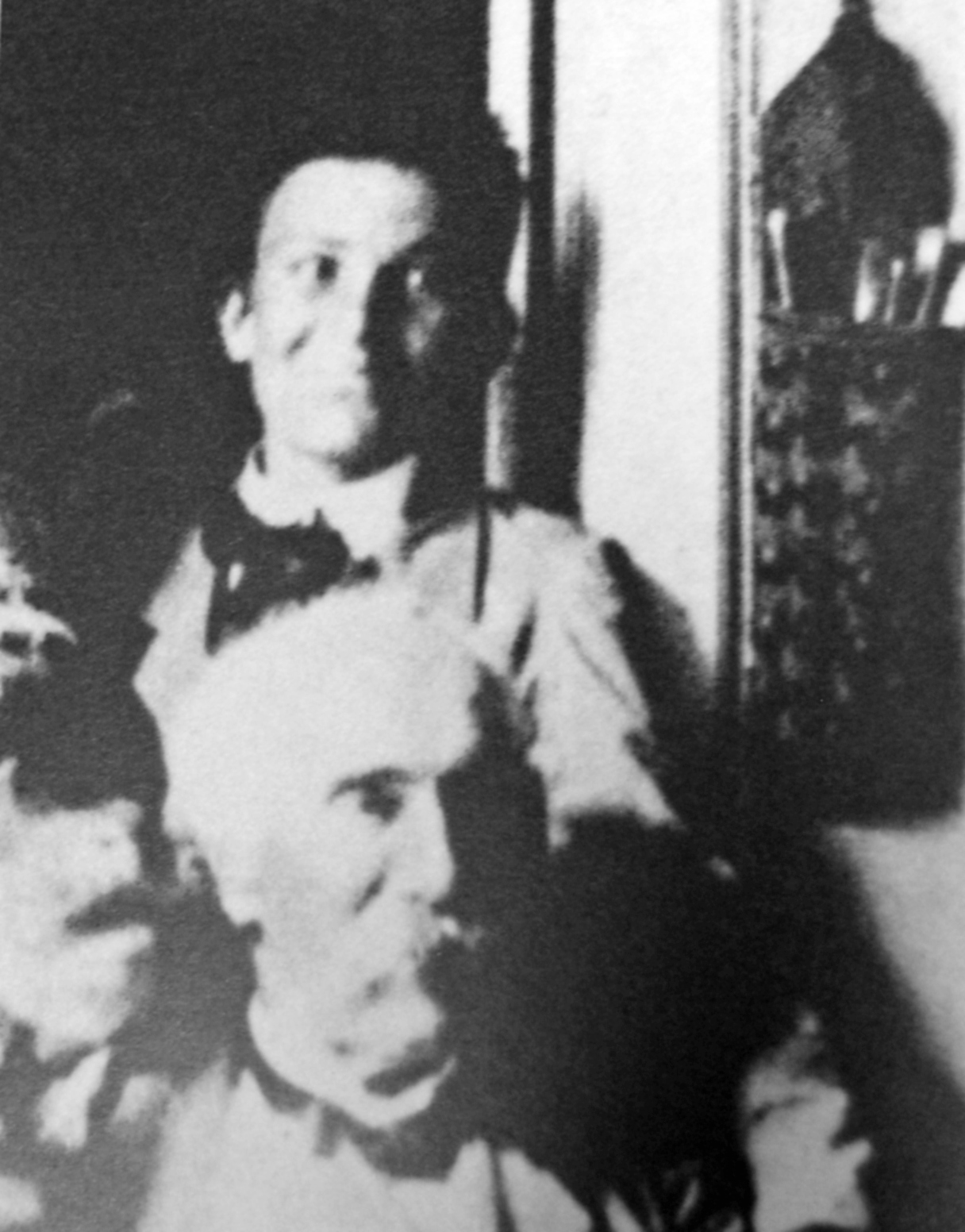
Fattori (1898); Modigliani in background.

== Selected paintings ==
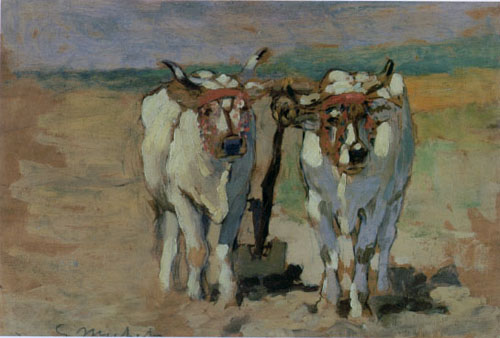
White Oxen

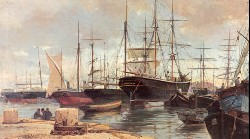
Port of Livorno
