= Lewis Evans (surveyor) =

Welsh-born surveyor and geographer (1700–1756)

- Born: c. 1700; Caernarfonshire, Wales
- Died: June 12, 1756 (aged 55–56); New York City, U.S.
- Burial place: Christ Church Burial Ground, Philadelphia
- Occupations: Surveyor; geographer
- Spouse: Martha Hoskins (m. 1743)
- Children: 1

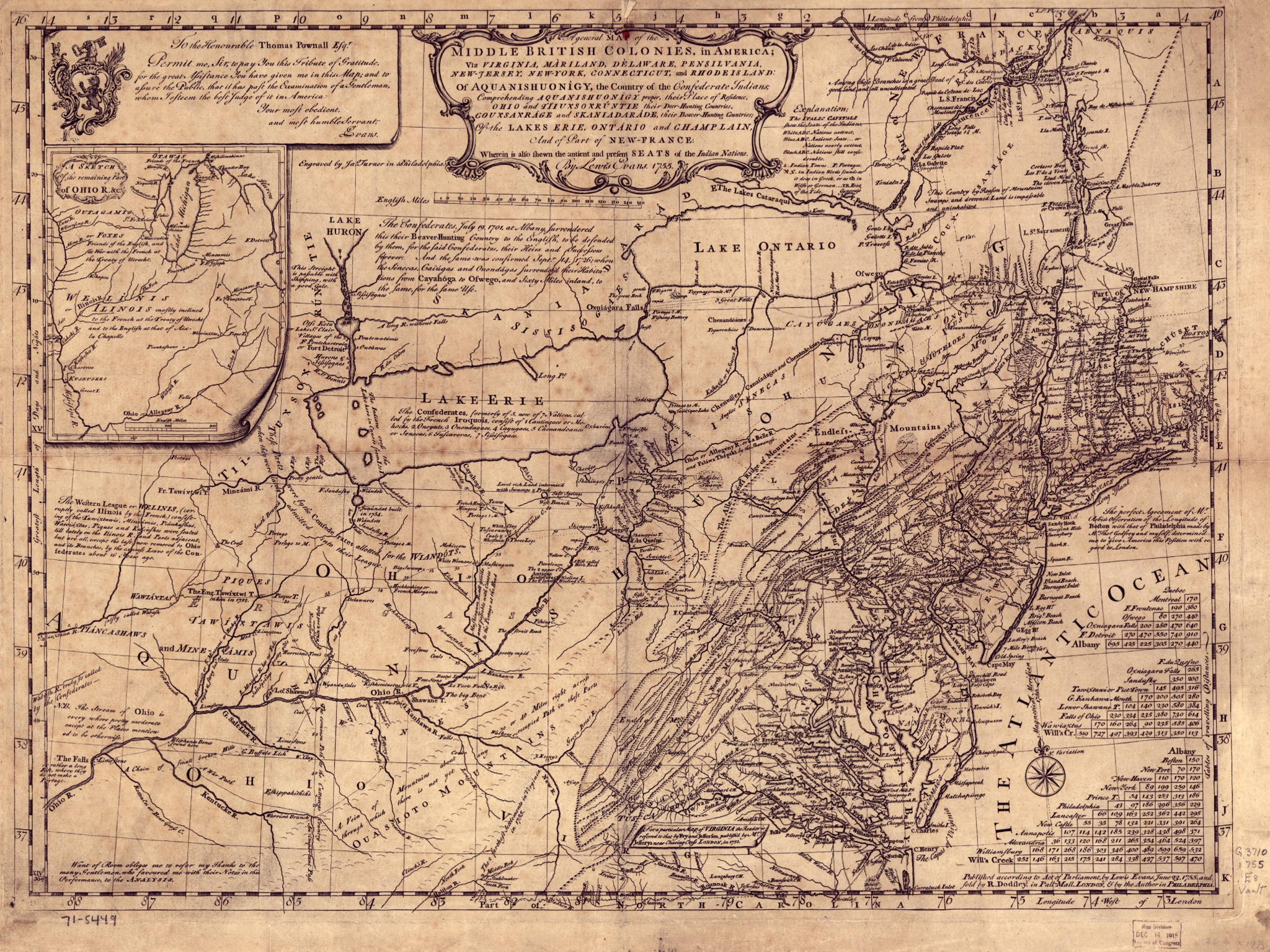
Evans's General Map of the Middle British Colonies in America, published in 1755, was made in collaboration with Thomas Pownall, to whom Evans dedicated it.

Lewis Evans (c. 1700 – 12 June 1756) was a Welsh surveyor and geographer. He had a brother John. In the mid-1730s he emigrated to British America, where he was based in Philadelphia. He was well known for his 1755 map of the Middle British Colonies.

== Biography ==
Lewis Evans was born in Caernarfonshire, Wales. He travelled to the British colonies in North America, where he settled in Philadelphia by the mid-1730s. In 1736 he bought a book from Benjamin Franklin, a printer, which was the start of their friendship. Franklin encouraged his geographic and scientific research. In 1743 Evans married Martha Hoskins, a friend of Franklin's wife Deborah Read Franklin. They had a daughter Amelia before Martha died in 1754, when the girl was ten.

As a surveyor, Evans travelled in the Onondaga country of the Iroquois in western New York province with Conrad Weiser, an important interpreter who had lived as a youth with the Mohawk, and botanist John Bartram. From this trip, he published a map of New York, New Jersey and Delaware. It was modified to include Pennsylvania and published as A Map of Pensilvania, New-Jersey, New-York, and the Three Delaware Counties (1749, revised 1752).

In 1751 Evans taught a class in geography and natural philosophy, as it was known, in Philadelphia, Newark, and New York.

In his A General Map of the Middle British Colonies in America (1755), Evans expanded his reach to include Pennsylvania, Virginia, Maryland, and part of New England. He published this map in his book Geographical Essays (formally, Geographical, Historical, Philosophical and Mechanical Essays Containing an Analysis of a General Map of the Middle British Colonies in America, and the Country of the Confederate Indians, with a General Map of the Middle British Colonies in America), also published in 1755 by Franklin and David Hall, as the first part of an unfinished work. Still cited, this work was recently noted by Marco Platania in an article in the electronic review Cromohs. The work was heavily criticised by the New York Mercury.

British colonial observer Thomas Pownall, secretary to Governor Danvers Osborne of New York, stayed in the colonies after Osborne's death in 1753 to study conditions, hoping to gain another position. He had met Benjamin Franklin and helped finance publication of the map by Evans, as both men considered it critical during the French and Indian War. The British were having to confront French forces in the interior of the colonies. Evans's map was highly regarded and used by General Edward Braddock during the war; Pownall received most of the public acclaim for it at the time.

Evans died in New York in June 1756. His body was returned to Philadelphia, where he was buried in the noted Christ Church Burial Ground, now listed on the National Register of Historic Places.

== Family ==
Evans's wife had died in 1754. He entrusted care of their daughter Amelia (Philadelphia, 1744 – Hythe, Southampton, 1835) to his brother John, who had followed him to the colony. John Evans died in 1759, and Amelia was brought up by Deborah and Benjamin Franklin. At eighteen she traveled to London for a period. Later she lived in Tunis, where she worked as a tutor to the three daughters of the British consul, James Traill and his wife.

There Amelia Evans met and married in 1770 a captain of the Irish Merchant marine, David Barry. He was particularly experienced in the areas of Bordeaux and the Médoc, from where he shipped wines to Ireland. They had five children together, among them their daughter Anna Africana Barry, who married a Swiss merchant in Livorno named Rodolfo Schintz. After Evans died in Pisa, he was buried in the Old English Cemetery, Livorno in 1781.

The widow Amelia Evans Barry anonymously published a novel, Memoirs of Maria, a Persian Slave (1790), financed by subscription. She was known to have had some earlier works, also anonymous, but most have not been found. The painter and engraver Alfredo Müller (1869–1939), and his brother Rodolfo (1876–1947), a cycling champion, are among her descendants. They were Swiss, born in Livorno but having their ancestry in the canton Appenzell des Rhodes Extérieures. Afredo later acquired French citizenship.

== Publications ==
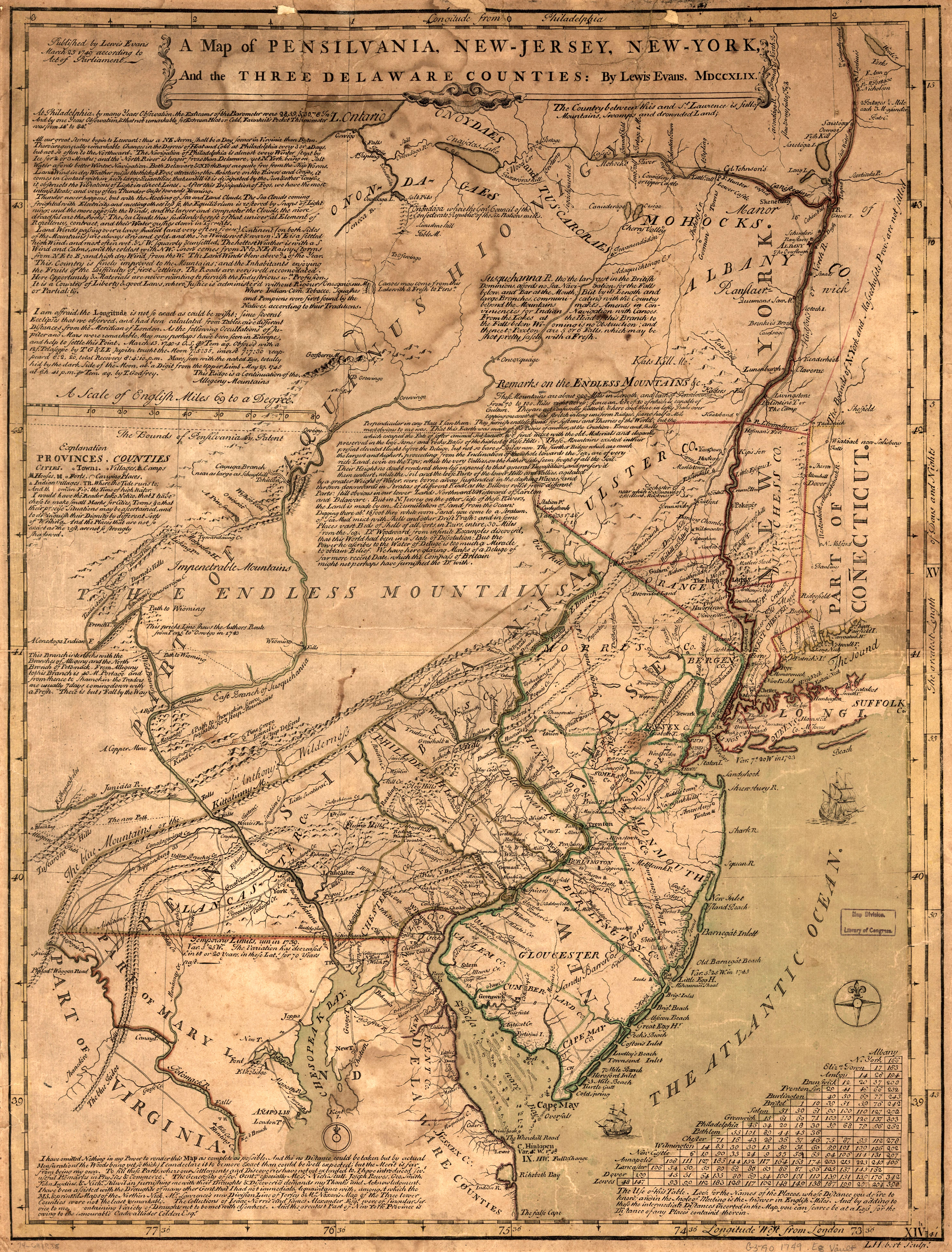
A Map of Pensilvania, New-Jersey, New-York, and the Three Delaware Counties, Lewis Evans, 1749

- Evans, Lewis, Brief Account of Pennsylvania, 1753.
- Evans, Lewis, Geographical, Historical, Political, Philosophical, and Mechanical Essays, Philadelphia, 1755 & London, 1756.
- "Geographical, historical, political, philosophical and mechanical essays". London. Robert Dodsley & James Dodsley. 1756.
- Gipson, Lawrence Henry, Lewis Evans, Philadelphia, 1939. (Biography.)

== See also ==
- Archibald Spencer
