= Micheluzzi =

Micheluzzi is an Italian surname. Notable people with the surname include:

- Attilio Micheluzzi (1930–1990), Italian comics artist
- Carlo Micheluzzi (1886–1973), Italian actor

== See also ==
- Michelozzi, another Italian surname
