= Ferruccio Rontini =

Italian painter (1893–1964)

Ferrucio Rontini (1893 – 1964) was an Italian painter, active in Livorno.

== Biography ==
He was born in Florence, and trained at the Academy of Fine Arts of Florence. He was one of the founders of the Gruppo Labronico, displaying works with them in the first three exhibitions. However, he had a fierce disagreements and did not exhibit again until 1931, and again after the second world war.
