= Corrado Michelozzi =

Italian painter

Corrado Michelozzi (16 August 1883 – 1965) was an Italian painter. He was active in Livorno in a Divisionist style, mainly depicting still lifes with floral and fruit arrangements.

He was born in Livorno. As a boy, he trained as a decorative painter of frescoes. He was part of the group of artists attending the Caffè Bardi in Livorno. He painted the theater curtain or sipario of the Teatro Goldoni in Livorno. In 1913, he exhibited the Secessione exhibition in Rome. After 1920, he participated in the exhibitions of the Gruppo Labronico until World War II, and then again in 1946. He was one of the founders of the group.
