= Richard Ranft =

- Born: 18 July 1862; Plainpalais, Geneva
- Died: 13 June 1931; Chantilly, France
- Known for: Painting
- Movement: Post-Impressionism

Richard Albin Ranft (18 July 1862 – 13 June 1931) was a Swiss post-impressionist portrait and landscapes painter, engraver, illustrator and poster artist.

== Biography ==
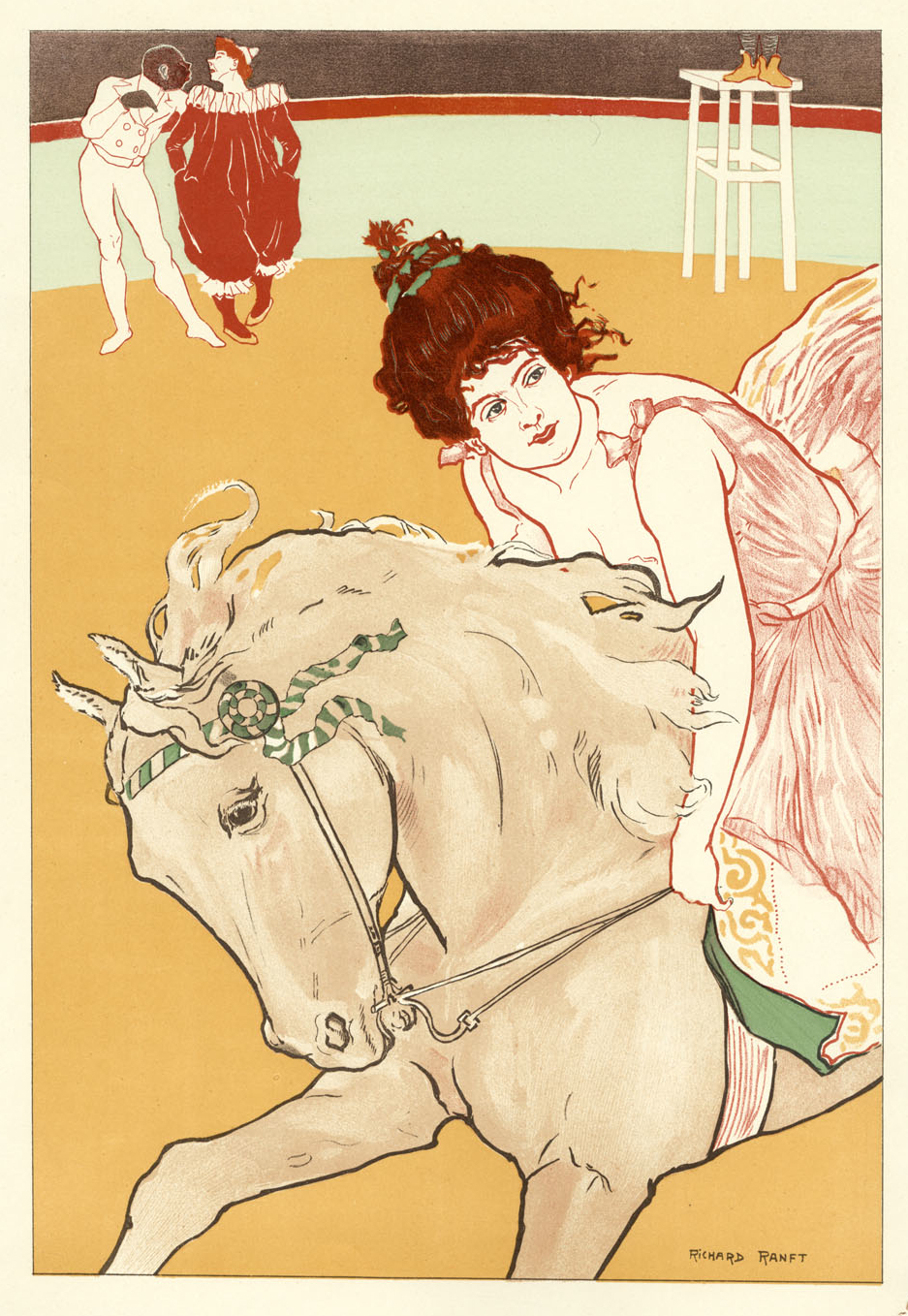
L'Écuyère, lithograph from L'Estampe Moderne (1897).

Ranft was born in Plainpalais and began studying painting and drawing in Geneva, under the direction of Eugene Etienne Sordet (1836-1915), who taught him the art of landscape painting. He then moved to Paris, where he attended the workshops of Gustave Courbet and Augustin-Alexandre Dumont, a sculptor who taught him engraving. Ranft then created many lithographed plates, including posters and etchings, while continuing with landscape painting.

In Paris he was elected a Full Member of the Société Nationale des Beaux-Arts, in whose Salons he exhibited regularly as well as in the Société des Artistes Indépendants.

Ranft died in June 1931. A few weeks later, Gustave Kahn paid tribute in the Mercure de France, when a retrospective of the painter was organized at the Autumn Salon.

== Works ==
Ranft illustrated several books, executed 85 original etchings in colour, 26 in black, several monotypes, one lithograph and sixteen etchings reproducing paintings by various artists, including Turner, Whistler and Reynolds. He exhibited at the First Symbolist Salon of the Rose+Croix in 1892. He was considered in England to be the best interpreter of J. M. W. Turner.

Between 1892 and 1913 he was the author of several illustrations for books, and two novels, Miss Orchair (1892) and L'Illustre Famille (1913).
