= Llewelyn Lloyd (painter) =

British-Italian painter (1879–1949)

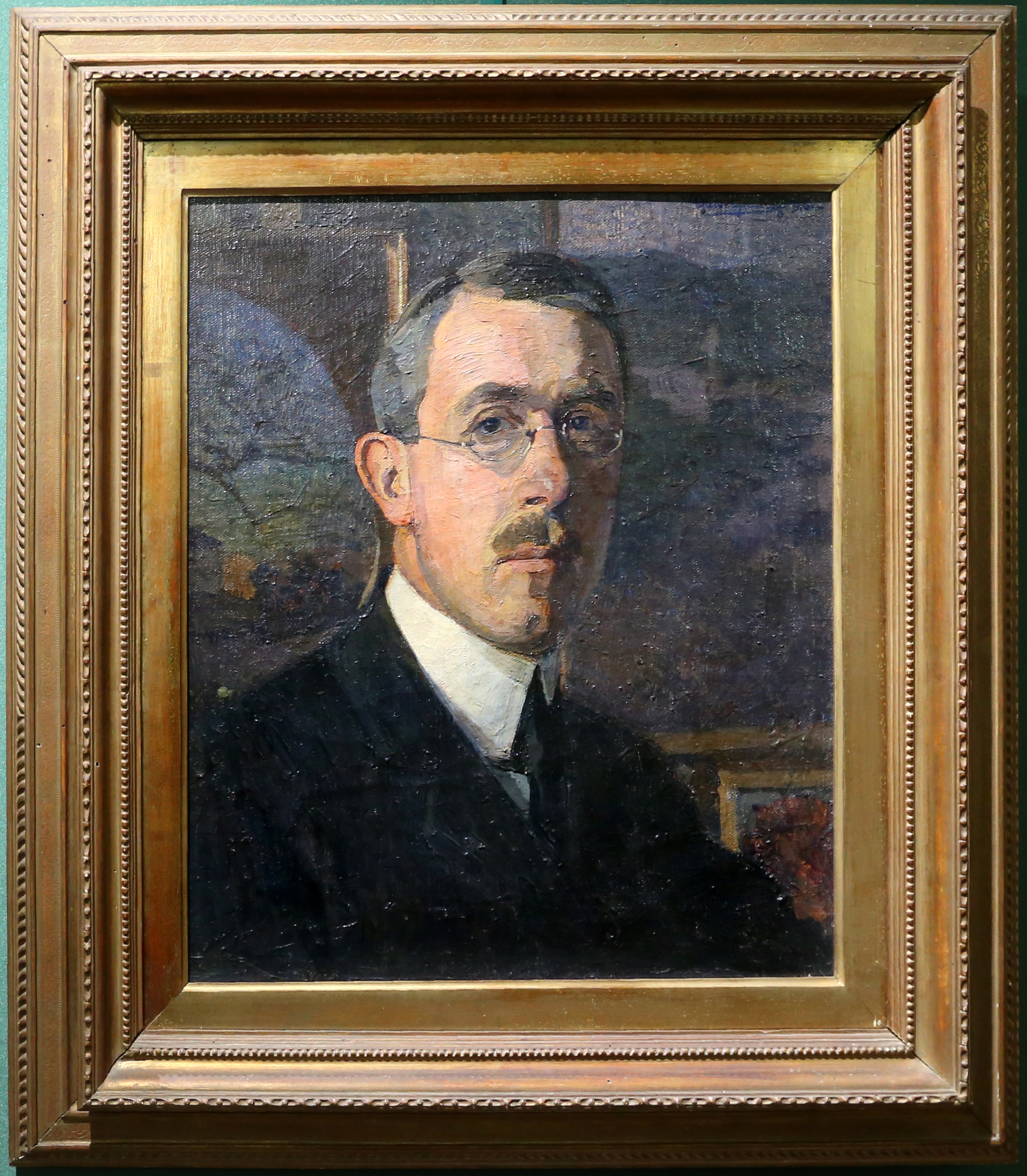
Self-portrait (1916), private collection

Llewelyn Lloyd (1879–1949) was a British-Italian painter, belonging to the Post-Macchiaioli movement.

== Biography ==
Born to a Welsh merchant working in Livorno, as a boy orphan, Llewelyn came under the care of an uncle. The uncle wished for the young man to study commerce, but instead Llewelyn chose to study (1894–1895) in the studio of Guglielmo Micheli where he met Modigliani, Romiti, Martinelli, and Ghiglia. There he also met Fattori, whom he followed to Florence.

He first exhibited at the 1897 Florentine Promotrice, with "Mattino al Calambrone" (Morning at Calambrone). He began painting seascapes and landscapes using divisionist techniques. He traveled to Liguria where he met the painters, including Lori and Discovolo, who had coalesced around Nomellini and became known as the Gruppo di Albaro, based on the hillside neighborhood where they worked.

Returning to Florence, in 1907 he exhibited in a hall at the Promotrice Fiorentina, titled the Secessione (Secession), recalling other prior anti-academic movements such as the Vienna Secession. In this hall, Costetti, De Carolis, Ghiglia, and Graziosi shared the walls with Lloyd.

In September 1907 he traveled to Elba, and the coasts were subjects of his paintings exhibited in the 1909 Venice Biennale. In 1914, he exhibited at the Roman Secessione along with a coterie of painters calling themselves the Giovine Etruria. In 1919, he published his book La pittura dell'Ottocento in Italia.

In 1922, he exhibited at the Fiorentina Primaverile and in 1923 at the Mostra della Corporazione delle Arti Decorative. In 1929 the Italian Navy commissioned portraits of its entire fleet from Lloyd. His works were exhibited in Spain, Portugal, and Tripolitania, and displayed at the 3rd Exhibition of Marine Art held in Rome. From 1931 to 1939 he exhibited a number of times at the Galleria d'Arte in Florence.

Because he had maintained British citizenship, he was arrested and interned in a prisoner camp, first at Fossoli di Carpi, then in Bavaria, until released on the war's end in 1945. Back in Italy, he was hosted by Roberto Papini, who collected his recollections in a semi-autobiographic, posthumous volume titled Tempi Andati (1949).
