= Mario Puccini =

Italian painter

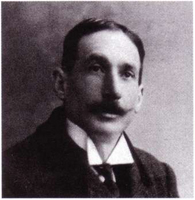
- Mario Puccini (date unknown)
- Born: Mario Puccini; 28 June 1869; Livorno
- Died: 18 June 1920 (aged 50); Florence
- Known for: Painting
- Movement: Post-Impressionism

Mario Puccini (28 June 1869 – 18 June 1920) was an Italian Post-Impressionist painter who specialized in landscapes and village scenes. He was sometimes referred to as "The Italian Van Gogh".

== Biography ==
He was born in Livorno. His father was a baker. Puccini worked in his father's bakery and sketched as a hobby until his talent was noticed by Giovanni Fattori, who encouraged him to enroll at the Academy of Fine Arts of Florence, which he did, against parental objections, in 1884 when he was only fifteen. While there, he studied with Fattori and was influenced by the works of Silvestro Lega.

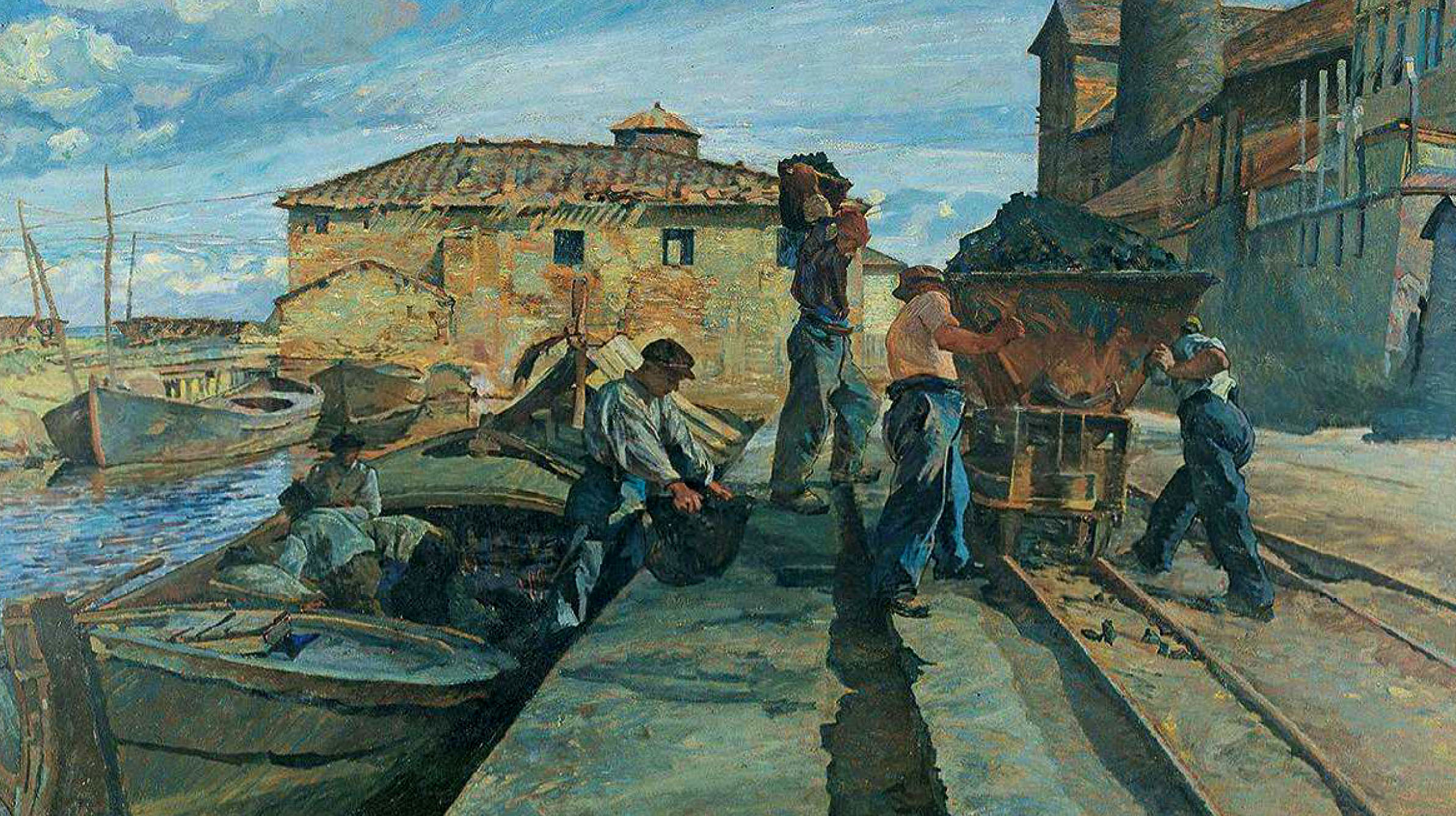
Metalworks ("La Metallurgica")

After graduating, he returned to Livorno and continued his studies at the "Scuola Libera del Nudo". In 1893, his family had him committed to a psychiatric hospital in Siena, citing depression and persecution mania as the justification. This condition may have been brought about by the infidelity of a woman he loved, or perhaps his family simply found him too temperamental to handle, but the experience produced a major change in his artistic style. He abandoned the realistic style of the Macchiaioli in favor of broad strokes and brighter colors; developing his own version of Divisionism. This combination of style and mental illness earned him his nickname: "The Van Gogh of Livorno" (later, "Italy").

Financially unsuccessful and impoverished, he worked as a waiter, created designs for embroiderers and milliners, made signs and sold the occasional painting. In 1911, he went to France for a year, living near his brother in Digne-les-Bains. While there, he painted maritime subjects and undertook to study the works of Paul Cézanne. When he returned to Livorno, he became an habitué of the Caffè Bardi (modeled after the Caffè Michelangiolo in Florence) which, since 1908, had served as a meeting place for the city's young artists; mostly from the generation after Puccini's. He began to exhibit and, by 1914, could earn his living entirely from his paintings.

At the age of fifty, after a brief hospitalization, he died in Florence from a neglected lung infection, aggravated by the long hours he spent outdoors, painting in Maremma. His unexpected death, just as he was beginning to be appreciated, caused great sorrow among his friends at the Caffè Bardi. A month later, fifteen of them met at the studios of Gino Romiti and established the "Gruppo Labronico" (Leghorn Group) to honor his achievements, promote the artists of Livorno, and have Puccini's body interred in the memorial chapel near the Sanctuary of Montenero. This process was stalled, for bureaucratic reasons, but the group persisted and his remains were finally placed there in 1988.

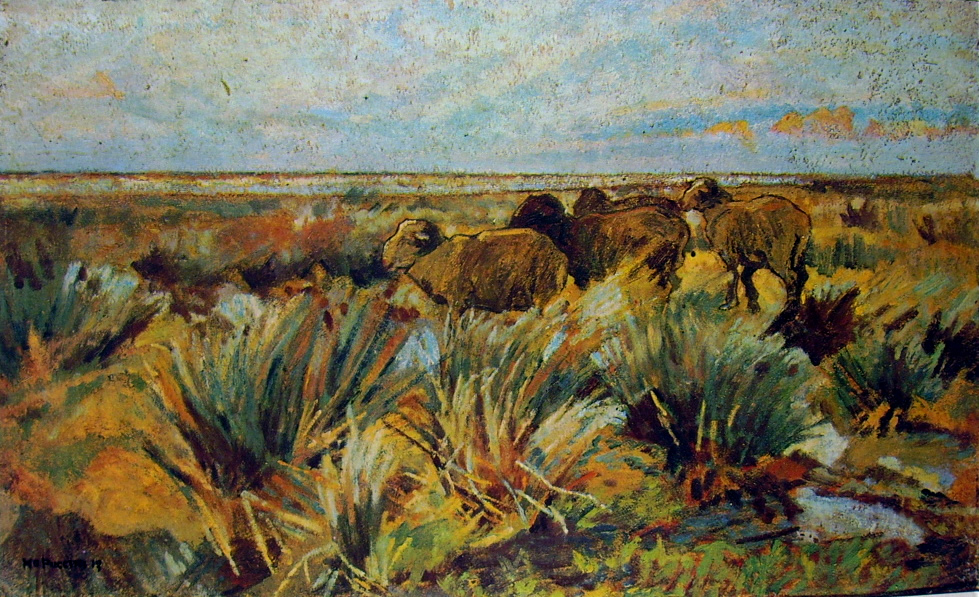
Pasture in Maremma

In 1949, a street in Quercianella was named after him.
