= Renato Natali =

Italian painter

Renato Natali (10 May 1883 – 7 March 1979) was an Italian painter, member of the post-Macchiaioli group of painters in Livorno during the first half of the 20th century. He often painted proletarian neighborhoods of the industrial port city of Livorno, as well as genre and cabaret scenes.

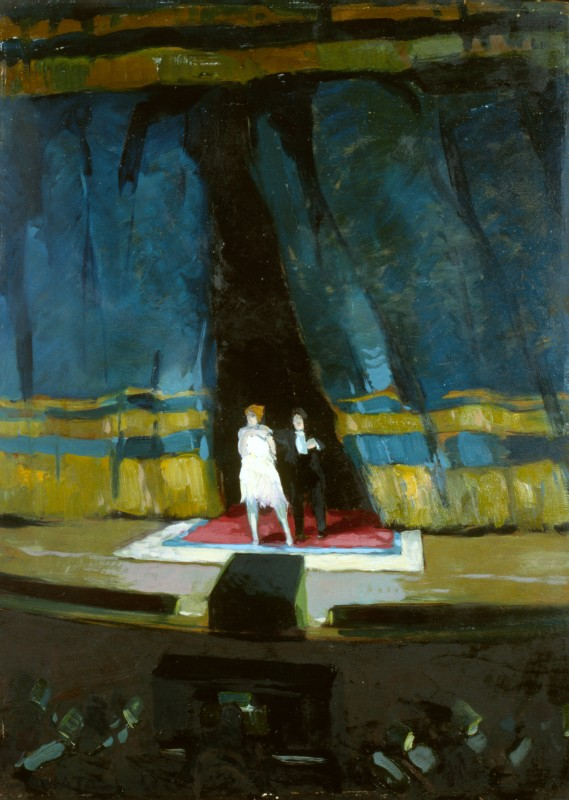
Alla Ribalta (circa 1930)

== Biography ==
He was born in Livorno. He did not attend a formal academy, although he was said to have learned from Guglielmo Micheli, and was a member of the Gruppo Labronico of painters that met in the Caffè Bardi in Livorno. He provided some of the decorations for the establishment. He travelled to Paris for two years in 1912, but is said to have fallen in love with Livorno while in Paris. In Paris, he encountered the vibrant bohemian circles of artists, including Amedeo Modigliani, and the works of Toulouse Lautrec. He participated in many exhibitions including the Venice Biennale, as well as exhibitions in the exterior, including Brighton (England), Minnesota (USA), Buenos Aires (Argentina), Cairo (Egypt) and Athens (Greece). In addition to painting, he practiced engraving, etching, and lithography. In 1978, he was awarded the honour of Commendatore al Merito dalla Repubblica. In 1980, Livorno sponsored a retrospective of his work. A "Mostra Antologica Renato Natali" was organized in 1968 by the Casa Comunale della Cultura a Livorno, and curated by Piero Caprile with a monograph by Aldo Santini.

Among the titles of his works are: Dramma, Rissa, Ombra, Chiacchiera, Ombre e Luci, Veglione, Mascherata, Sera estiva, Musica Rusticana, Rotonda, Via dei Mulini a Vento, Voltina, Lazzeretto di Ardenza, and Baruffa
