= Gino Romiti =

Italian painter (1881–1967)

Gino Romiti (1881–1967) was an Italian painter, active in Livorno.

== Biography ==
He was born in Livorno, and trained under Guglielmo Micheli, along with Manlio Martinelli, Llewelyn Lloyd, Amedeo Modigliani, and Aristide Sommati. In 1898, he exhibited at the Permanente di Milano nel 1898, and at the Venetian Esposizione d’Arte in 1908 and 1912, returning to the Biennale in 1952. A member of the Gruppo Labronico of painters that met in the Caffè Bardi, he decorated the meeting room with a canvas of the Birth of Venus. Among the painters of the group, he had affinities with Symbolist styles of the times, depicting some underwater marine subjects.

The Gruppo Labronico was founded in his studio on 15 July 1920. He was president of the group from 1946 until its closing.
