= Gruppo Labronico =

Italian artistic association

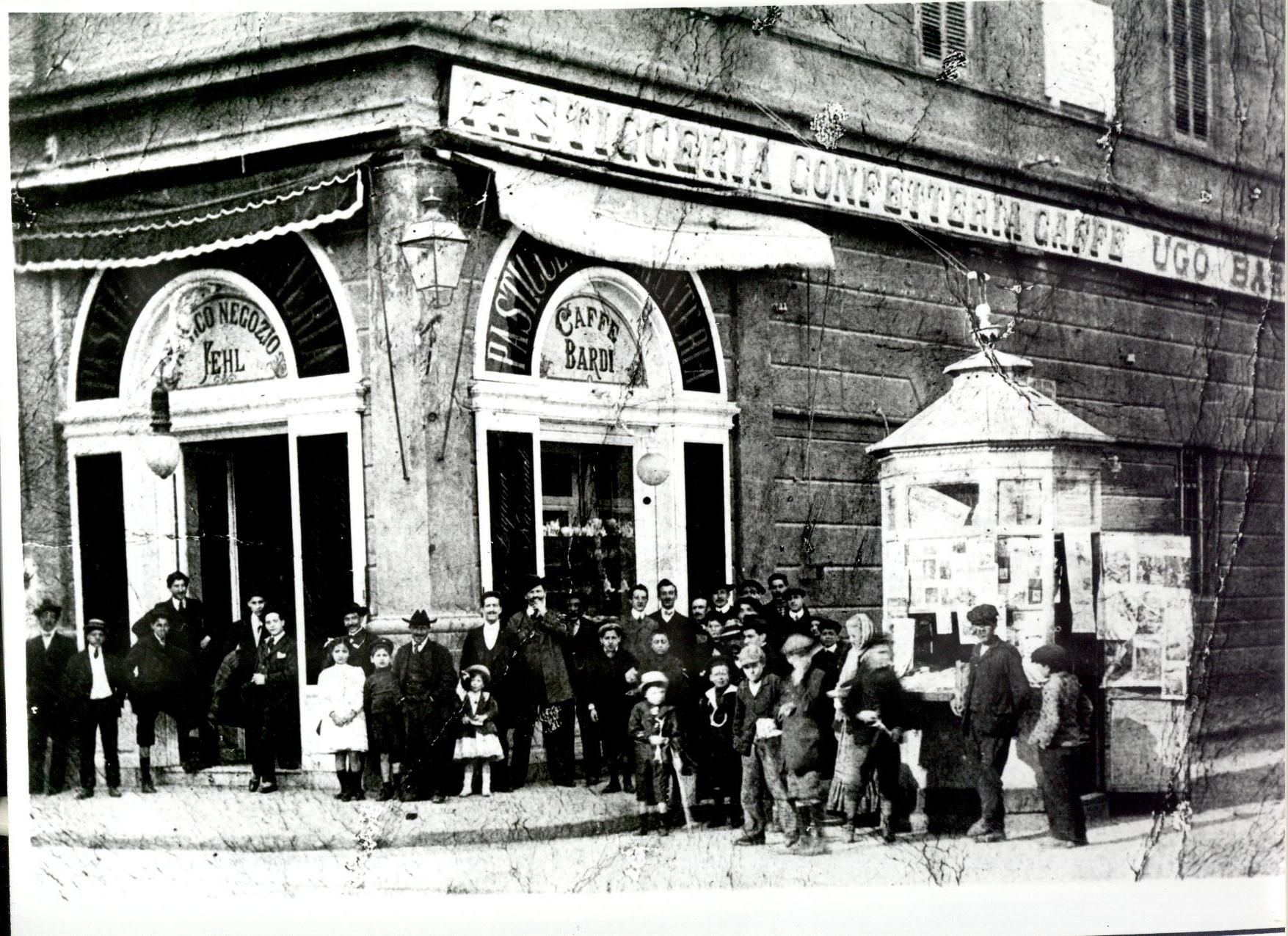
Some founding members in front of the Caffé Bardi in Livorno.

The Gruppo Labronico is an Italian artistic association founded in Livorno in 1920.

== History ==
The Labronico group of artists is rooted in the heyday of the Caffè Bardi. After the Caffè closed and the death of Mario Puccini, the Gruppo Labronico was founded in Gino Romiti's studio on July 15, 1920. Among the other founders of the Gruppo Labronico were: Gino Romiti, Adriano Baracchini-Caputi, Tito Cavagnaro, Gino Cipriani, Goffredo Cognetti, Beppe Guzzi, Giovanni March, Corrado Michelozzi, Renato Natali, Gastone Razzaguta, Renuccio Renucci, Carlo Romanelli, Ferruccio Rontini, Cesare Tarrini, Alberto Zampieri and Giovanni Zannacchini.

Gino Romiti was president of the group from 1946 until its closing. Mario Borgiotti joined the group in 1947 and became its President in 1967.

In May 2014, the Gruppo Labronico donated its historical archives (1920-1932) to the city of Livorno. The inventory of the archives is available at the Museo Civico "Giovanni Fattori". In 2020, the group celebrated one hundred years of existence.

== Bibliography ==
- Farinella, V.; Schiavon, G. (2011). L'eredità di Fattori e Puccini. Il gruppo labronico tra le due guerre (in Italian). Pacini Editore. ISBN 978-8863151138.

== Filmography ==
- Gruppo Labronico (2010), documentary by Luca Dal Canto

== See also ==
- Caffè Bardi
- Macchiaioli
- Italian modern and contemporary art
