= Caffè Bardi =

Coffee house in Livorno, Italy

Coordinates: 43.5479°N 10.3110°E

The former Caffè Bardi was a notable coffee house and meeting place in the 19th through mid-20th century for artists and intellectuals in Livorno, a region of Tuscany, Italy. The coffee-house no longer exists and stood at the corner of via Cairoli and Piazza Cavour.

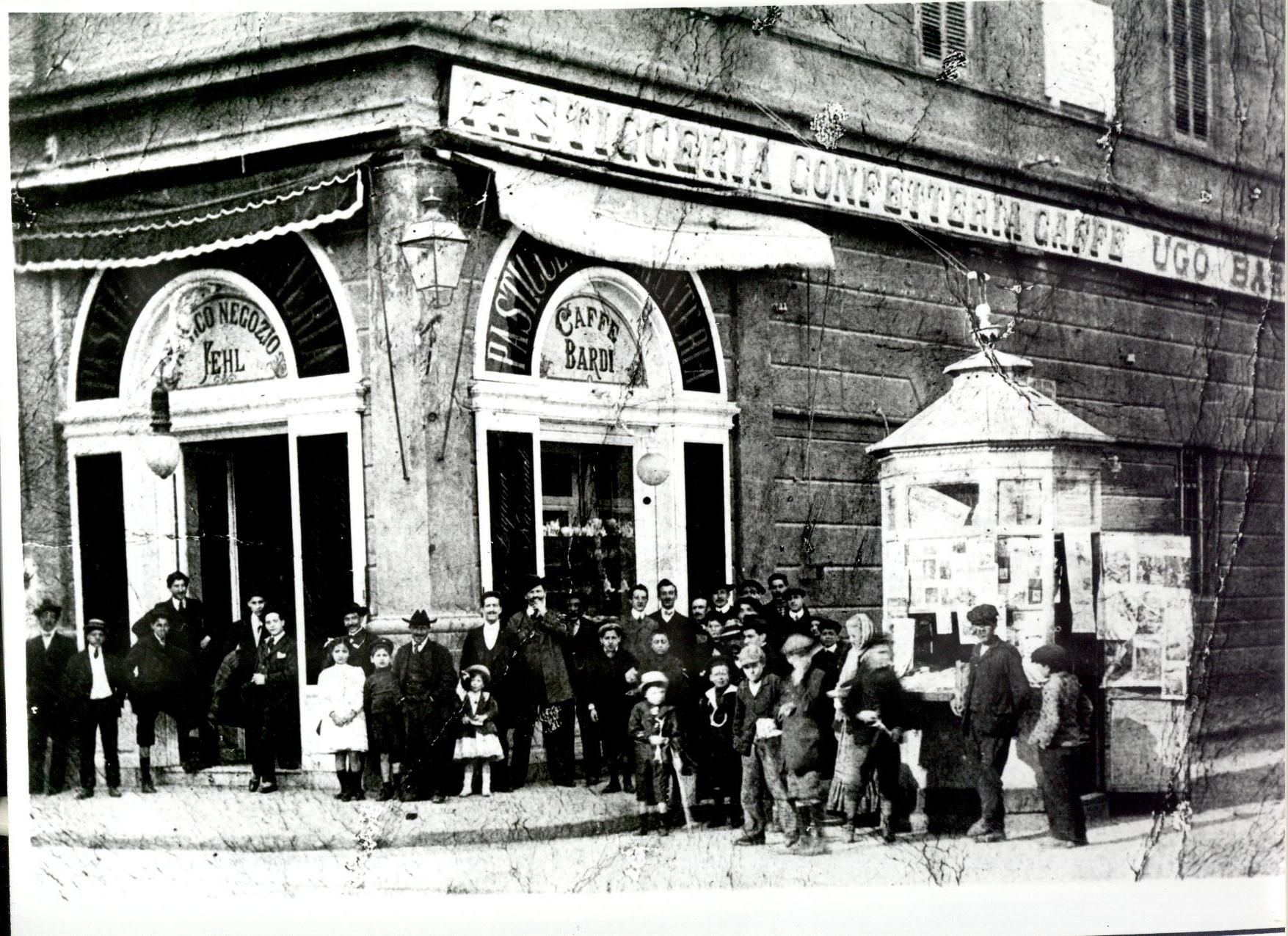
Caffè-Bardi circa 1920

In Florence, Caffè Michelangiolo had played a role as a meeting place for painter of the Macchiaioli movement; in Livorno, in the first decades of the twentieth century, this coffee house played the equivalent role of the development of a local group of painters known as the Gruppo Labronico.

Founded in 1908 by Ugo Bardi, the interiors of the coffee house were once populated by contemporary artworks, including works by Gino Romiti and Renato Natali since removed. One of the frequent early attendees was Amedeo Modigliani. There is a legend that Modigliani once brought one of his avant-garde sculptures to show to his friends, but their dislike caused him to bury them in a nearby ditch. The coffee house closed in 1921. Amedeo Modigliani probably attended the establishment during his trips to Livorno in 1909 and 1913.

== See also ==
- Caffè Michelangiolo
