= Plinio Nomellini =

Italian painter (1866–1943)

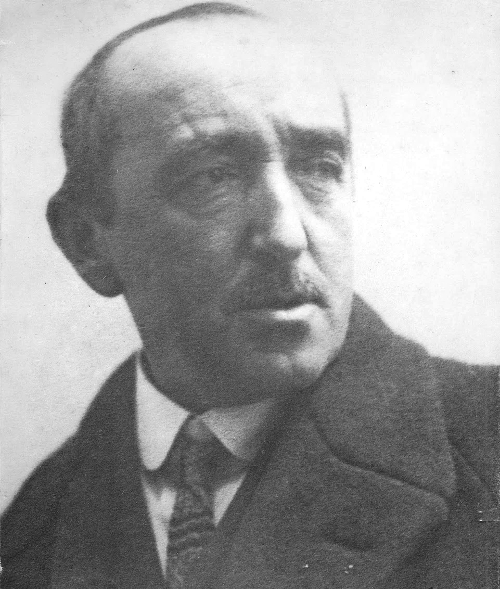
Plinio Nomellini (date unknown)

Plinio Nomellini (6 August 1866 – 8 August 1943) was an Italian painter in the Divisionist style.

== Biography ==
He was born in Livorno to Coriolano Nomellini, a customs official, and his wife Cesira née Menocci. In 1883 and 1884, he attended the municipal school of arts and crafts and took drawing lessons from Natale Betti. Thanks to his recommendations, in 1885 he was able to enroll at the Academy of Fine Arts in Florence and studied under Giovanni Fattori.

In the following years he had several exhibits; at the "Society for the Promotion of the Fine Arts" (1886), where he exhibited a portrait and a landscape called An Olive Grove, and at the Academy (1887), where he exhibited The Meeting and The Tombolo. Also at the Academy (1888), he exhibited a Portrait of Nina Van Zandt and The Haymaker. That same year, at the Society, he displayed the following paintings: In the Sun, The Strike; The Journey is Finished; Wild Flowers; Mouth of the Calambrone, and The Summer of San Martino. He also took part in the Exposition Universelle of 1889.

In 1890 he moved to Genoa and lived there until 1902. During that time, he focused on watercolors. He also participated in exhibitions held by the Genoese "Society for the Promotion of the Fine Arts". In 1891, at the 1st Brera Triennale, he exhibited a piece inspired by the Genoese workers' strikes. In 1894, due to similar paintings and his apparent support for a Genoese labor group, he was arrested on charges of anarchism. After spending several months in prison, he was tried and acquitted, thanks to contributions from his fellow artists which provided for his legal defense. Later in the 90s he became the focal point of a lively artistic set known as the Gruppo d’Albano. He was a regular exhibitor at the Venice Biennale until 1899. That same year, he married Griselda Ciucci.

He moved to Torre del Lago in 1902; initially as the guest of his friend Giacomo Puccini. in 1907, he took up Symbolism and was involved in the creation of the "Dream Room" at the 7th Venice Biennale. He continued to participate in exhibitions elsewhere, including Genoa, Turin, Milan, Florence and Rome. In 1909, he participated in the Paris Salon d'Automne. Five years later, he became a Freemason at the lodge named after Felice Orsini in Viareggio.

After World War I, what had been a quiet rural area became more developed so, in 1919, he moved to Florence, where he focused on landscape painting, making numerous trips to Capri and Elba. During the 20s, he became an early and enthusiastic supporter of the Fascist movement. This was expressed most Notably in a painting called Incipit Nova Aetas, which celebrates the Blackshirts coming to Florence.

During the 1920s and early 30s, he continued to exhibit with great regularity, until his wife's death in 1936. He was President of the Gruppo Labronico from 1928 until his death in 1943, in Florence.

== Selected paintings ==
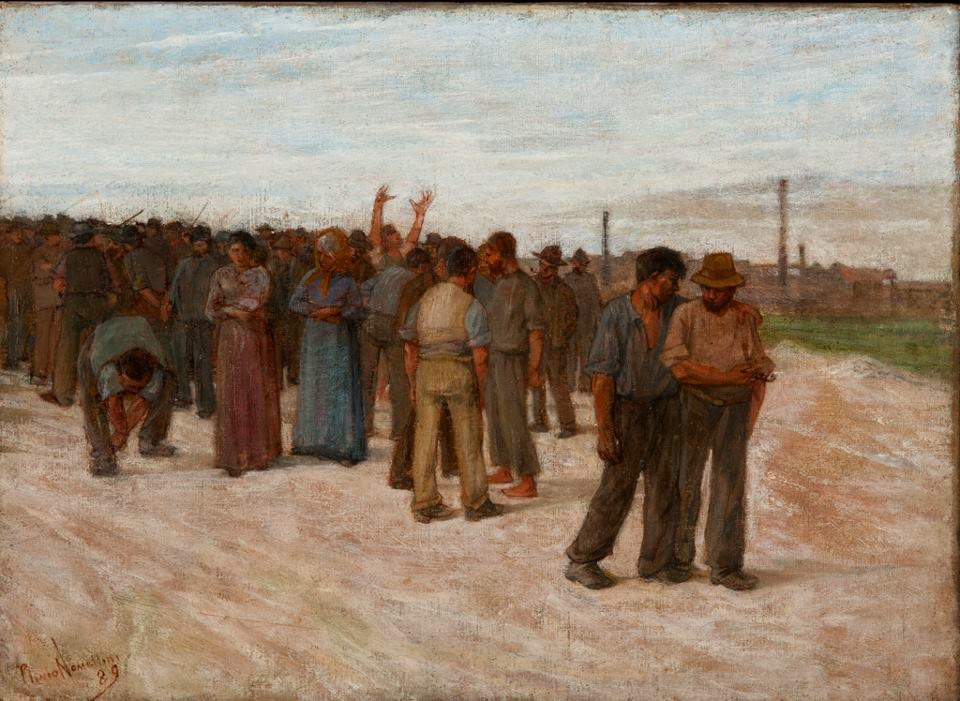
London Strike

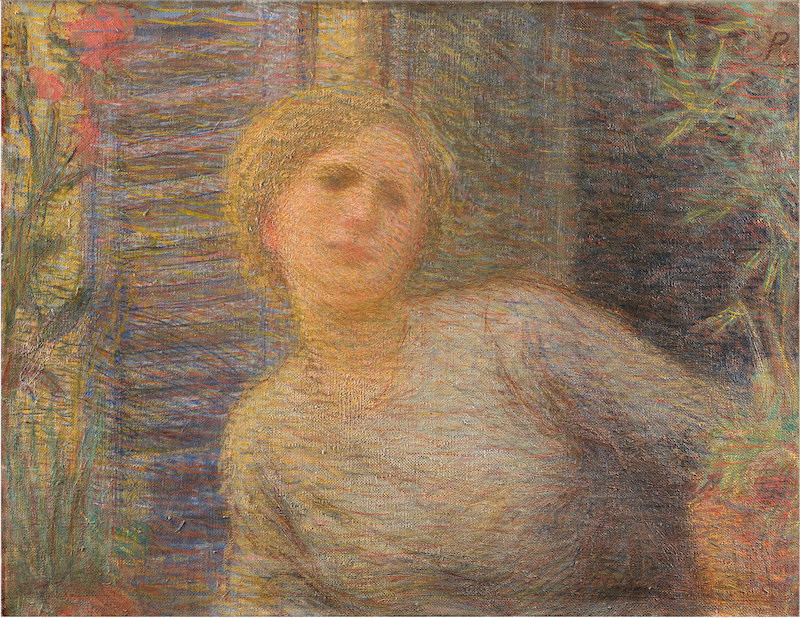
Girl at the Window

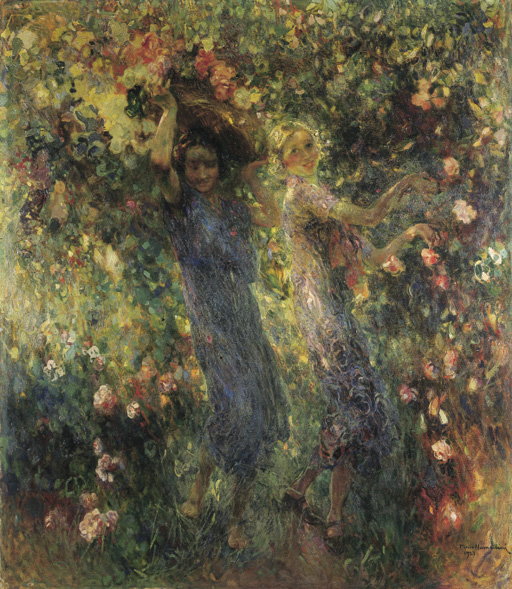
The Roses of
Poggio Imperiale

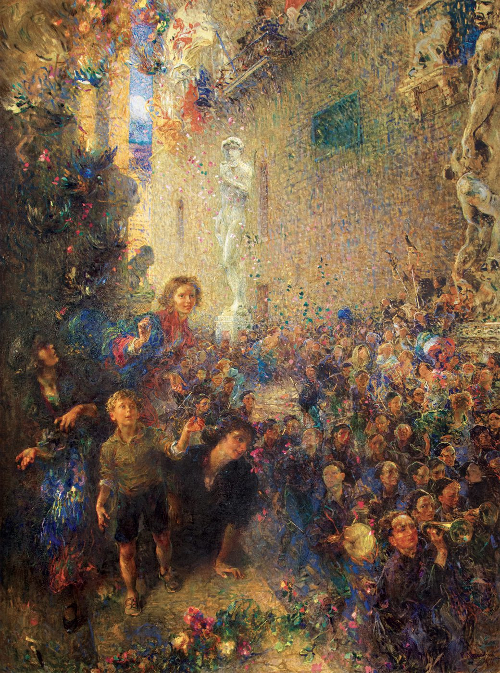
Incipit Nova Aetas
(A New Age Begins)

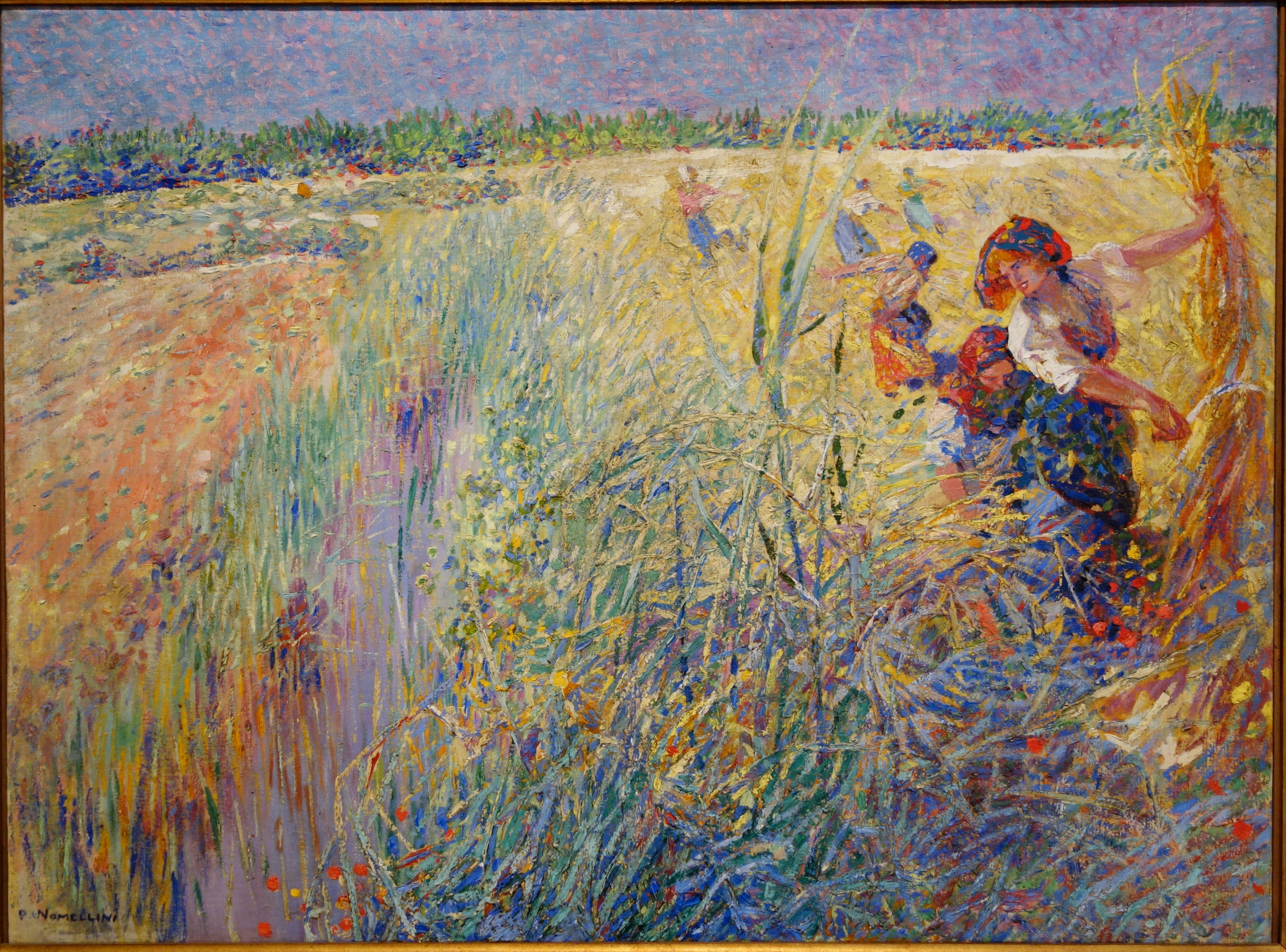
The Harvest

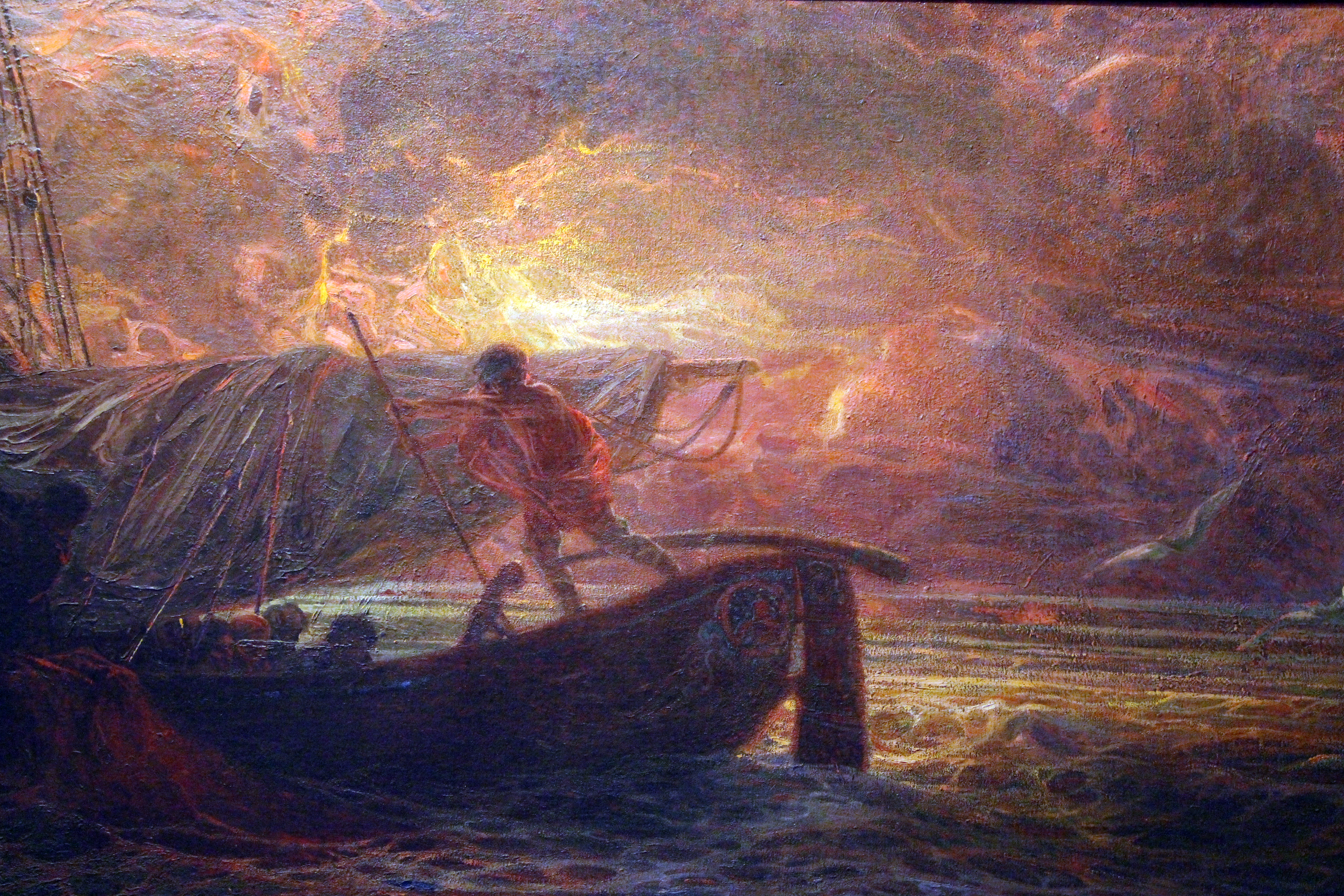
The Corsairs
