= Ulvi Liegi =

Italian painter (1858–1939)

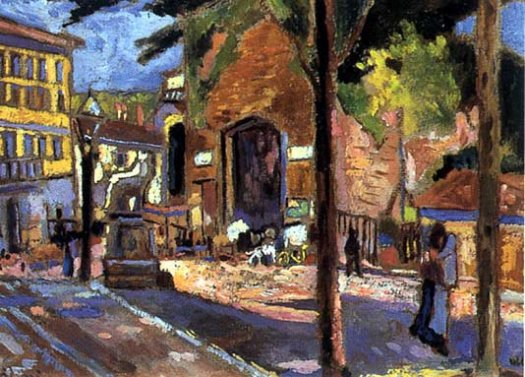
Porta Romana in Livorno by Ulve Liegi, ca. 1900–1920

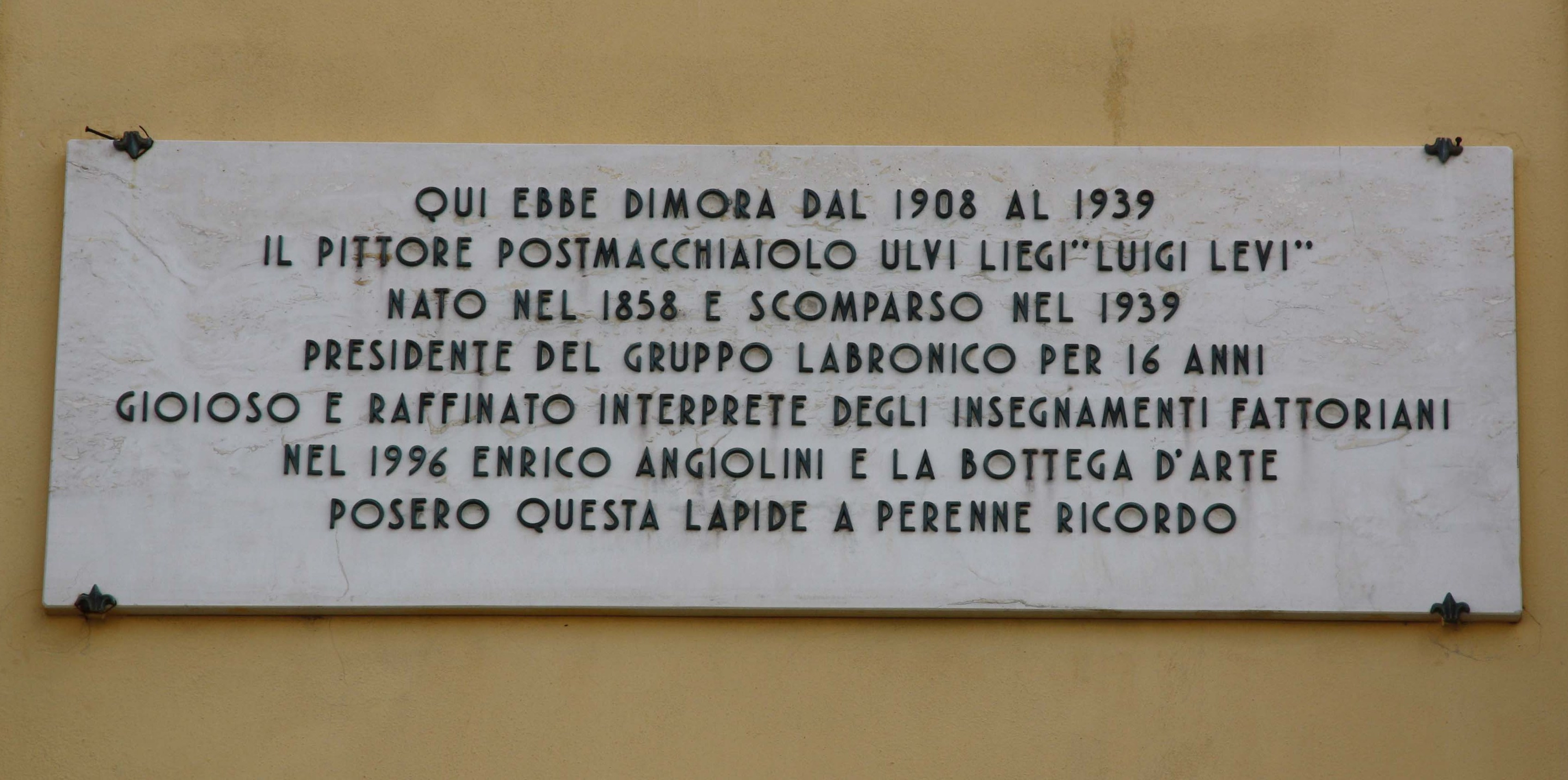
Commemorative plaque in Livorno

Luigi Mosè Levi (1858–1939), known professionally as Ulvi Liegi, was an Italian painter and printmaker. Part of the Postmacchiaioli movement, he painted various cityscapes of Livorno and depictions of Livornese daily life.

== Biography ==
Luigi Levi, who signed his paintings as Ulvi Liegi (an anagram of his real name), was born in Livorno in a wealthy Jewish family. He got initial art education in Livorno, and then he moved to Florence, where he studied in the Academy of Arts under Adolfo Tommasi, Carlo Markò the Younger, and Giuseppe Ciaranfi. While in Florence, he became friends with many artists from the Macchiaioli group, first Telemaco Signorini, and later one of the leaders of the group, Giovanni Fattori. Liegi first exhibited his paintings in 1882, and got positive responses. In the 1880s, he painted in the style close to the Macchiaioli, but later started to paint in a style close to impressionism. In 1886–1888 Liegi visited Paris, where he studied works of impressionists, and London; in 1889, two of his works were exhibited in the World's Fair in Paris.

In 1882, he exhibited at the Mostra of the Società d'incoraggiamento delle Belle Arti of Florence three studies dal vero; in 1884, Liegi sent to Turin three landscapes: Un tramonto lungo il Mugnone; Una giornata grigia nei campì; Un effetto autunnale. In 1887 at Venice, he exhibited: After the rain; Sulla strada del Romito a Florence; Giornata invernale; Sulla sera al Manzollo presso Florence. In 1888, he exhibited at Bologna: Nei campi, dopo the pioggia; Giornata d' inverno, presso San Gervasio, large dal vero study. The same year in London and in 1889 at Paris and at the Promotrice of Florence, he sent: Nel Mugnone; Tramonto; Casolari in montagna; Garda; and Barche peschereccie a Riva ed altri.

From 1890 to 1908, Liegi lived in Florence, but often spent summers in Liguria. In 1908, he moved to Livorno, and stayed there until his death in 1939. He was part of the Post-macchiaioli, a term used for all Tuscan painters active from the 1880’s to around 1920. In 1918, Liegi had his first personal exhibition, in Galleria Mario Galli in Florence. Since 1920, he was the president of the Gruppo Labronico and promoted Livornese art. He died in 1939 in extreme poverty.

== Ulvi Liegi in museums ==
At Giovanni Fattori Civic Museum of Livorno are

- Scalo Regio (1922)
- I bastioni del Granduca (1922)
- The Central Market (1924)
- The Synagogue in Livorno (1935)

At the National Gallery of Modern and Contemporary Art of Rome:

- Le suore sulla spiaggia (1927)
- Viale attraverso la pineta (1929)

== Principal exhibitions ==
- 1882 Florence, group exhibition at "Company of the fine arts."
- 1884 Turin, "national exhibitions in Turin."
- 1884 Florence, group exhibition at "Company of the fine arts."
- 1884 Florence, "national exhibitions in Florence."
- 1996 Livorno, Livorno The Art Exhibit at the baths Pancaldi.
- 1887 Venice, "national exhibitions in Venice."
- 1888 Bologna "national exhibitions in Bologna."
- 1888 London, enrolling in the Italian Exhibition.
- 1889 Paris Universal Exposition participation.
- 1889 London show at the Slade School.
- 1904 Florence, the exhibition at Palazzo Corsini.
- 1918 Florence, a solo show at the "gallery of Mario Galli".
- 1924 Milan, collective Leghorn Group at the Galleria Pesaro.
- 1927 Milan, collective Leghorn Group at the Galleria Pesaro.
- 1932 Milan, collective Leghorn Group at the Galleria Pesaro.
