= Italian Neoclassical and 19th-century art =

From the second half of the 18th century through the 19th century, Italy went through a great deal of socio-economic changes, several foreign invasions and the turbulent Risorgimento, which resulted in the Italian unification in 1861. Thus, Italian art went through a series of minor and major changes in style, which marked the transition from Enlightenment to Romanticism.

The Italian Neoclassicism was the earliest manifestation of the general period known as Neoclassicism and lasted more than the other national variants of neoclassicism. It developed in opposition to the Baroque style around c.1750 and lasted until c.1850. Neoclassicism began around the period of the rediscovery of Pompeii and spread all over Europe as a generation of art students returned to their countries from the Grand Tour in Italy with rediscovered Greco-Roman ideals. It first centred in Rome where artists such as Antonio Canova and Jacques-Louis David were active in the second half of the 18th century, before moving to Paris. Painters of Vedute, like Canaletto and Giovanni Paolo Panini, also enjoyed huge success during the Grand Tour. Neoclassical architecture was inspired by the Renaissance works of Palladio and saw in Luigi Vanvitelli and Filippo Juvarra the main interpreters of the style.

Classicist literature had a great impact on the Risorgimento movement: the main figures of the period include Vittorio Alfieri, Giuseppe Parini, Vincenzo Monti and Ugo Foscolo, Giacomo Leopardi and Alessandro Manzoni (nephew of Cesare Beccaria), who were also influenced by the French Enlightenment and German Romanticism. The virtuoso violinist Paganini and the operas of Rossini, Donnizetti, Bellini and, later, Verdi dominated the scene in Italian classical and romantic music.

The art of Francesco Hayez and especially that of the Macchiaioli represented a break with the classical school, which came to an end as Italy unified (see Italian modern and contemporary art). Neoclassicism was the last Italian-born style, after the Renaissance and Baroque, to spread to all Western Art.

== History and influences ==
Just like in other parts of Europe, Italian Neoclassical art was mainly based on the principles of Ancient Roman and Ancient Greek art and architecture, but also by the Italian Renaissance architecture and its basics, such as in the Villa Capra "La Rotonda". Classicism and Neoclassicism in Italian art and architecture developed during the Italian Renaissance, notably in the writings and designs of Leon Battista Alberti and the work of Filippo Brunelleschi. It places emphasis on symmetry, proportion, geometry and the regularity of parts as they are demonstrated in the architecture of Classical antiquity and in particular, the architecture of Ancient Rome, of which many examples remained. Orderly arrangements of columns, pilasters and lintels, as well as the use of semicircular arches, hemispherical domes, niches and aedicules replaced the more complex proportional systems and irregular profiles of medieval buildings. This style quickly spread to other Italian cities and later to the rest of continental Europe.

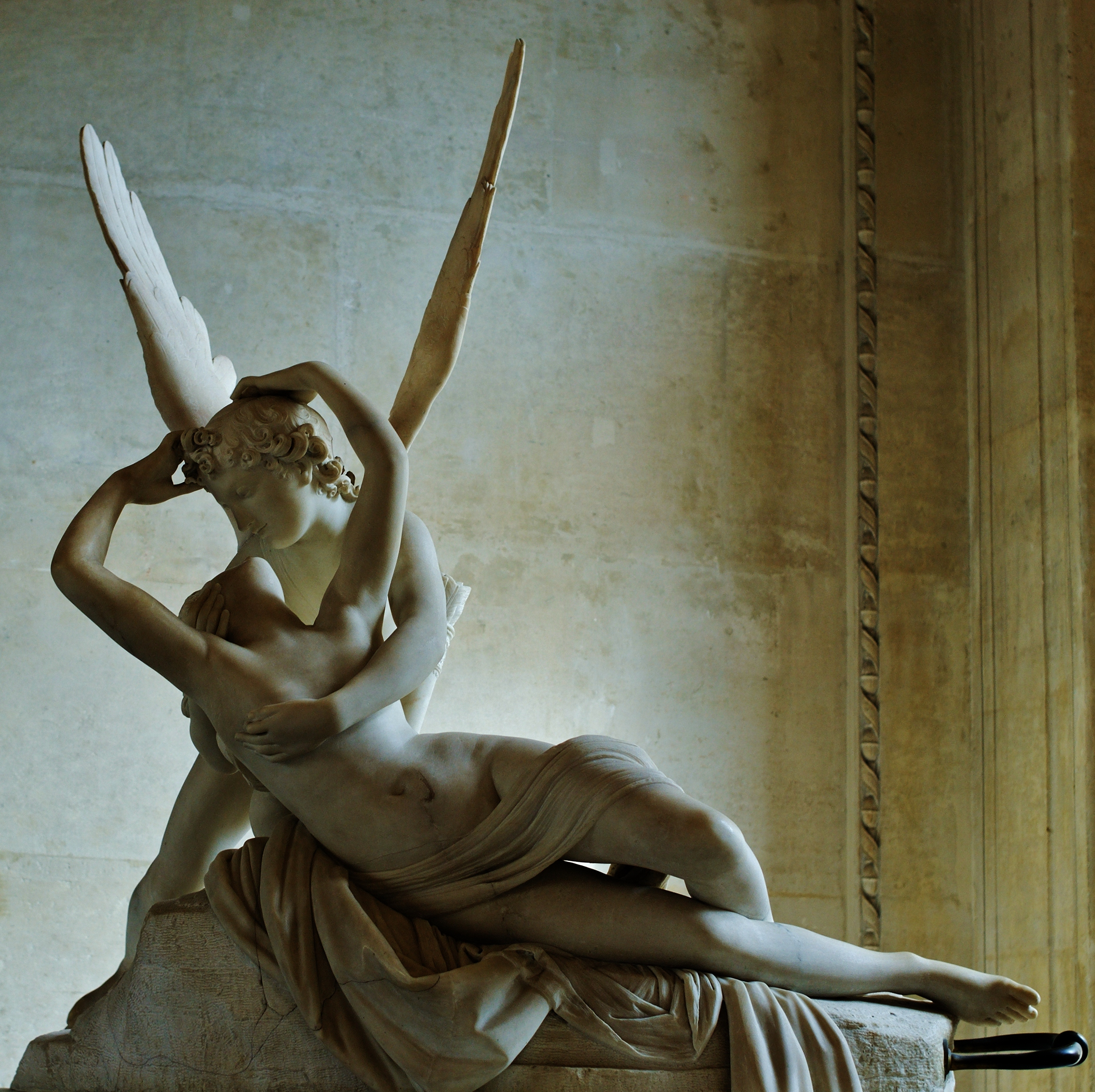
Antonio Canova's Psyche Revived by Love's Kiss

In the visual arts the European movement called "neoclassicism" began in Italy around 1750 in Rome, as a reaction against both the surviving Baroque and Rococo styles, and as a desire to return to the perceived "purity" of the arts of Rome, the more vague perception ("ideal") of Ancient Greek arts, and, to a lesser extent, 16th-century Renaissance Classicism. Indoors, neoclassicism made a discovery of the genuine classic interior, inspired by the rediscoveries at Pompeii and Herculaneum, which had started in the late 1740s, but only achieved a wide audience in the 1760s, with the first luxurious volumes of tightly controlled distribution of Le Antichità di Ercolano.

Napoleon Bonaparte, who ruled most of Italy in the early 19th century hired Antonio Canova, one of the most influential Italian neoclassical sculptors and plastic artists to make sculptures for him, one of the most famous being that of Venus Victrix, an allegory of Pauline Bonaparte.

Italy also developed several other artistic movements in the 19th century, like the Macchiaioli, who influenced French impressionism. The city of Milan later emerged as a major centre of 19th-century Romantic art. The city became a major European artistic centre during the Romantic period, when Milanese Romantic was influenced by the Austrians, who ruled Milan at the time. Probably the most notable of all Romantic works of art held in Milan is "The Kiss", by Francesco Hayez, which is held in the Brera Academy.

== Prominent artistic movements ==
=== I Macchiaioli ===
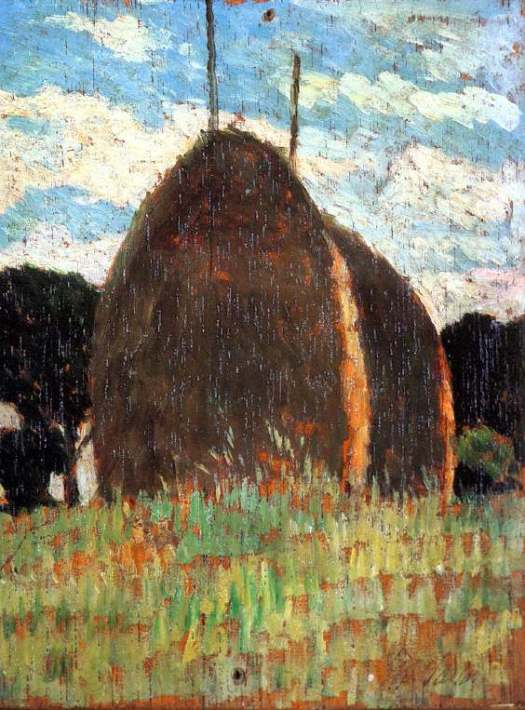
Hay Stacks by Giovanni Fattori, a leading artist in the Macchiaioli movement.

The Macchiaioli were a group of Italian painters from Tuscany, active in the second half of the 19th century, who, breaking with the antiquated conventions taught by the Italian academies of art, painted outdoors in order to capture natural light, shade, and colour. The Macchiaioli were forerunners of the Impressionists who, beginning in the 1860s, would pursue similar aims in France. The most notable artists of this movement were Giovanni Fattori, Silvestro Lega and Telemaco Signorini.

The movement grew from a small group of artists, many of whom had been revolutionaries in the uprisings of 1848. The artists met at the Caffè Michelangiolo in Florence throughout the 1850s to discuss art and politics. These idealistic young men, dissatisfied with the art of the academies, shared a wish to reinvigorate Italian art by emulating the bold tonal structure they admired in such old masters as Rembrandt, Caravaggio and Tintoretto. They also found inspiration in the paintings of their French contemporaries of the Barbizon school.

They believed that areas of light and shadow, or "macchie" (literally patches or spots) were the chief components of a work of art. The word macchia was commonly used by Italian artists and critics in the 19th century to describe the sparkling quality of a drawing or painting, whether due to a sketchy and spontaneous execution or to the harmonious breadth of its overall effect.

A hostile review published on 3 November 1862 in the journal Gazzetta del Popolo marks the first appearance in print of the term Macchiaioli. The term carried several connotations: it mockingly implied that the artists' finished works were no more than sketches, and recalled the phrase "darsi alla macchia", meaning, idiomatically, to hide in the bushes or scrubland. The artists did, in fact, paint much of their work in these wild areas. This sense of the name also identified the artists with outlaws, reflecting the traditionalists' view that new school of artists was working outside the rules of art, according to the strict laws defining artistic expression at the time.

In its early years the new movement was ridiculed. Many of its artists died in penury, only achieving fame towards the end of the 19th century. Today the work of the Macchiaioli is much better known in Italy than elsewhere; much of the work is held, outside the public record, in private collections there.

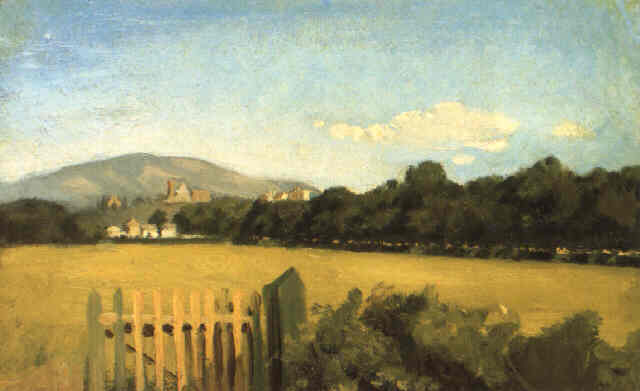
A Macchiaioli painting of a meadow by Raffaello Sernesi.

=== Purismo ===
Purismo was an Italian cultural movement which began in the 1820s. The group intended to restore and preserve language through the study of medieval authors, and such study extended to the visual arts.

Inspired by the Nazarenes from Germany, the artists of Purismo reject Neoclassicism and emulated the works of Raphael, Giotto and Fra Angelico.

The group's ideals were iterated in their manifesto Del purismo nelle arti, in 1842–43 which was written by Antonio Bianchini and co-signed by Tommaso Minardi (1787–1871), the major proponent of Purismo, Nazarene co-founder Friedrich Overbeck and Pietro Tenerani.
