= Odoardo Borrani =

Italian painter (1833–1905)

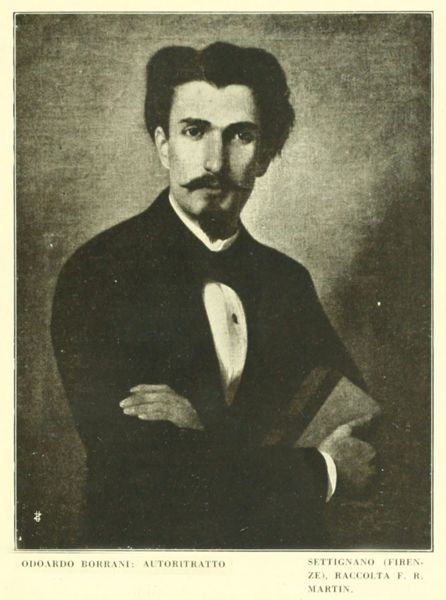
Self-portrait (date unknown)

Odoardo Borrani (22 August 1833 – 14 September 1905) was an Italian painter associated with the Macchiaioli group.

== Biography ==
He was born in Pisa. The Borrani family moved to Florence, where Odoardo enrolled at the Academy of Fine Arts in 1853. There, he studied under Gaetano Bianchi, Giuseppe Bezzuoli, and Enrico Pollastrini. However, he became independent of the academic styles.

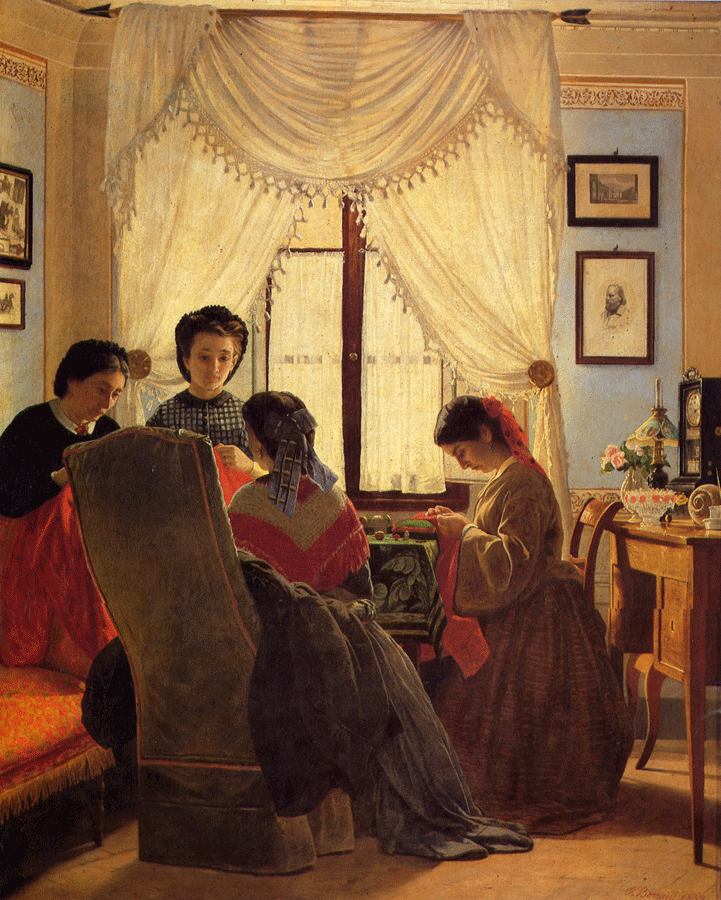
Cucitrici di camicie rosse ("Sewing red shirts for the volunteers"), 1863

His first painting while at the Academy was titled Un veglione di maschere alla Pergola. In 1859, he painted Lorenzo the Magnificent Saves Himself From Being Murdered in the Sacristy of the Cathedral, an episode of the Pazzi Conspiracy. For this painting. Borrani was awarded the Gold medal by the contest of the Accademia of Florence. That same year, he joined the army and upon returning from the short campaign, he painted the Cadaver of Jacopo de' Pazzi and Michelangelo Directs the Fortification of Florence.

It was with his new friends Telemaco Signorini and Vincenzo Cabianca that he took up painting from life and came into contact with the Macchiaioli group gravitating around the Caffè Michelangiolo. He served as a volunteer in the Second Italian War of Independence in 1859. In 1862, together with Giuseppe Abbati, Silvestro Lega, Raffaello Sernesi and Signorini, he went to work in the countryside outside Florence near Piagentina, in consequence of which these painters became known as the school of Piagentina. It was also in 1862 that he first spent the summer at Castiglioncello, as the guest of the critic Diego Martelli.

In 1875, he and Lega established a gallery to promote younger artists, but it soon went out of business. He exhibited less frequently in his later years and made his living as a teacher, ceramic decorator, and graphic artist for L'Illustrazione Italiana. He died of peritonitis in Florence on 14 September 1905.

Among his works are La mietitura nella montagna Pistoiese; Speranze perdute (Lost Hope), Al Coro, Il richiamo del contingente (Rescue of the Contingent); Le primizie; L' Arno (The Arno); Il torrente Mugnone; In attesa del pittore; Interno della church of Santa Monica; Firenze il 9 gennaio 1878; La vigilia della Sagra; La sterpata di San Rossore; Cammelli in riposo; Una Vestale Cristiana; Il ritorno sotto le armi; Fate la carità; L'Estasi di Santa Teresa (Ecstasy of St Teresa); Un mattino sul torrente Magnolie which was exhibited at the Esposizione di Roma; Un pensiero mondano (A Mundane Thought); Antica porta a Pinti avanti la demolizione; La Cosacela presso Firenze; La Nonna (The Grandmother); Una Monaca; In cerca di documenti; Episodio di Carnevale; Mi chiama?; La mia cucina (My Kitchen); Goldoni; Maria Stuarda (Mary Stuart); Un alabardiere (Halberdier); San Giovanino; Costumi fiorentini del 1500; Contadina Romana; Mezza figura di bambina col gatto; Al mio studio; Curiosità; Gioie materne; La mietitura nelle maremme toscane; L'annegato; L'analfabeta (The Illiterate); Il regalo al padrone (Gift to the Godfather); Teco vegliar m'è caro; I prepativi per la festa; Per l'acqua; Motivo dal vero; as well as many watercolors and portraits.

== Other projects ==
Media related to Odoardo Borrani at Wikimedia Commons
