= Silvestro Lega =

Italian painter (1826–1895)

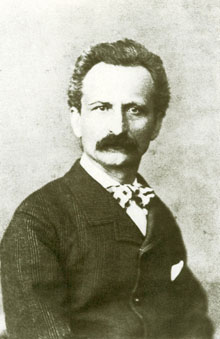
- Born: 8 December 1826 Height - 5'9 Weight - 186 Pounds; Modigliana, Italy
- Died: 21 September 1895 (aged 68); Florence, Italy

Silvestro Lega (8 December 1826 – 21 September 1895) was an Italian realist painter. He was one of the leading artists of the Macchiaioli and was also involved with the Mazzini movement.

== Biography ==
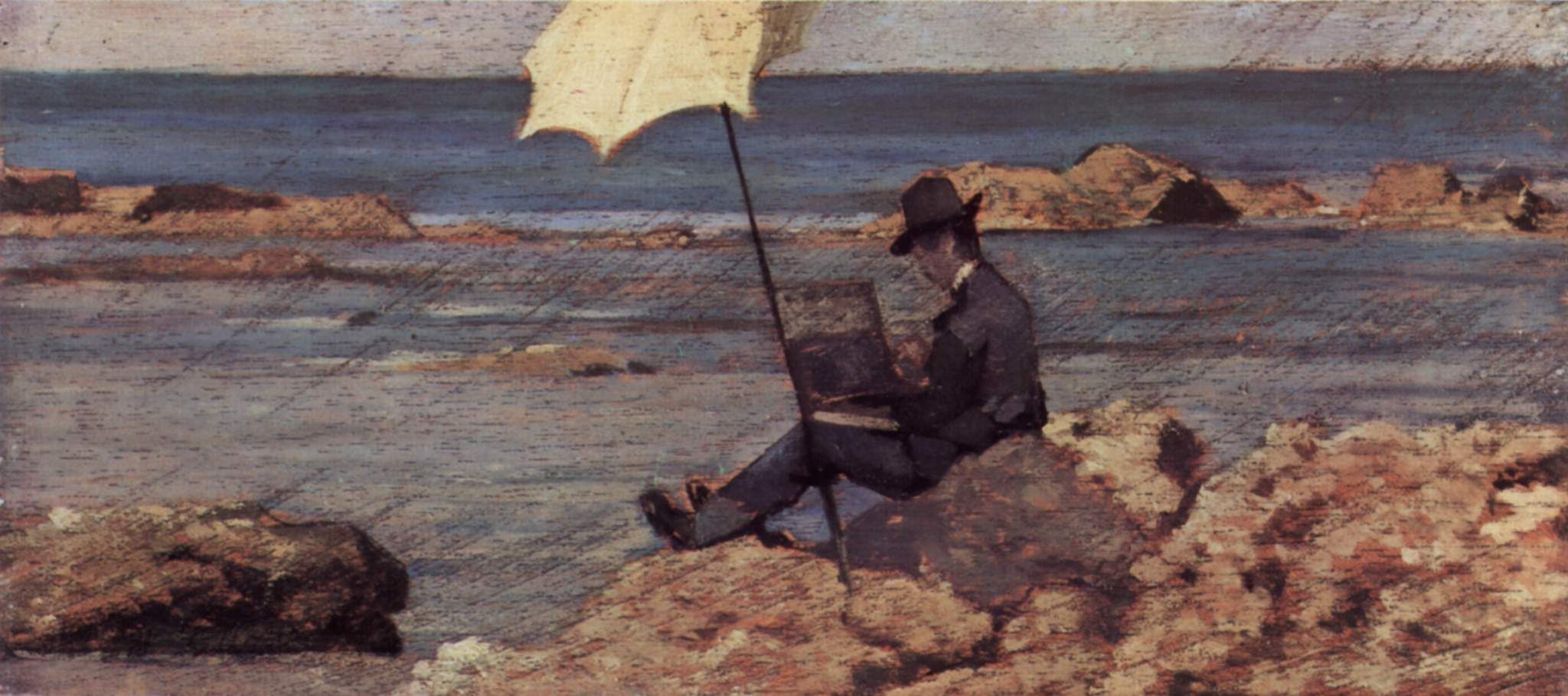
Giovanni Fattori, Silvestro Lega painting at Riva al Mare, 1866–67, Oil on panel, 12.5 x 21 cm, Collection Jucker, Milan

He was born in Modigliana, near Forlì, to an affluent family. From 1838 he attended the Piarist College, where his skill at drawing became evident. From 1843 to 1847 he attended the Accademia di Belle Arti, Florence, studying drawing under Benedetto Servolini (1805–79) and Tommaso Gazzarrini (1790–1853), then studying painting, briefly, under Giuseppe Bezzuoli. During 1847 he attended Luigi Mussini’s school, where the teaching emphasized the 15th-century Florentine principles of drawing and orderly construction. Then and for some years afterwards he continued to attend the Scuola del Nudo of the Accademia.

As a Garibaldian volunteer, Lega participated in the military campaigns for Italian independence (1848–49) before resuming his training, this time under Antonio Ciseri. In 1850 he completed his first large-scale painting, Doubting Thomas (Modigliana, Osp. Civ.). In 1852 he won the Concorso Trienniale dell’Accademia with David Placating Saul. On 30 January 1853, he became a member of the Accademia degli Incamminati of Modigliana. In 1855, Lega returned to his native town, where he remained until 1857.

Serious by nature, Lega was an infrequent visitor of the Caffè Michelangiolo, a favorite meeting place in the 1850s for the young painters who later became known as the Macchiaioli. Diego Martelli, a contemporary of Lega, wrote of him that "he was not one of those people who, artistically speaking, can fling themselves into novel developments .... In spite of the discussions that went on nightly in the crucible of the Caffè Michelangiolo, Lega's art, until 1859, remained conspicuously academic." Subsequently, Lega's style began moving towards Realism and away from the Purismo of Mussini. This progress is evident in the four lunettes he painted between 1858 and 1863 for the Oratory of the Madonna del Cantone in Modigliana, and in several military-themed works he painted during that period. Together with his Macchiaioli friends Odoardo Borrani, Giuseppe Abbati, Telemaco Signorini and Raffaello Sernesi, he started painting landscapes en plein air.

From 1861 to 1870, he lived with the Batelli family, near the Affrico river, and started a relationship with the elder daughter, Virginia. The children and women of the Batelli family were the subjects of many of his paintings during this happy period of his life.

In 1870, he was awarded the silver medal at the Parma's National Exposition. In that same year, Virginia Batelli, his companion, died of tuberculosis. Three of Lega's brothers also died at about this time. The grieving Lega returned to Modigliana. Depressed, and experiencing the onset of eye problems, he ceased painting almost entirely for four years between 1874 and 1878. In 1875, he and Borrani established a modern art gallery in Florence, but it quickly failed, and Lega's financial problems worsened. In 1878 he took part in the preparations for the Paris Universal Exposition. At the Florentine Promotrice in 1879, Lega—who never traveled outside Italy—saw two Impressionist paintings by Camille Pissarro, which he admired.

He became a frequent guest of the Tommasi family, and a tutor of the sons of the family. The art historian Norma Broude says that "like the Batellis before them, [the Tommasis] welcomed Lega into their family circle and provided for him the warm and close-knit family environment in which he and his art could flourish." In 1886, he painted one of his most famous works, the Gabbarigiane.

By the mid-1880s, Lega was almost blind, and perceived only large masses. He produced many paintings in Gabbro, where he was a guest of the Bandini family. He participated at the Exposition Universelle (1889) and at the Promotrice of Florence.

Lega died in Florence in 1895 of stomach cancer.

== Style ==
Lega's artistic career may be divided into two periods: the first is the calm phase, where he looked at the world optimistically. The second is the disturbed phase, associated with his poor economic conditions and with his depression after Virginia's death.

Efrem Gisella Calingaert says:

the originality of Lega’s style lies in the way he adapted a contemporary use of colour, based on direct experience of the motif, to a traditional type of composition and carefully defined forms. This is illustrated by the Singing of the Ballad (1867; Florence, Pitti), which, together with A Visit (1868; Rome, G.N.A. Mod.) and The Pergola, constitute the most important works of Lega’s mature period and perhaps of his whole career. In the Singing of the Ballad the simplicity and balance of the composition, the transparency of the colours and rendering of atmosphere, the monumentality of the figures in profile and their pyramidal forms invest the scene with the solemnity of a painting by Piero della Francesca.

== Partial list of works ==
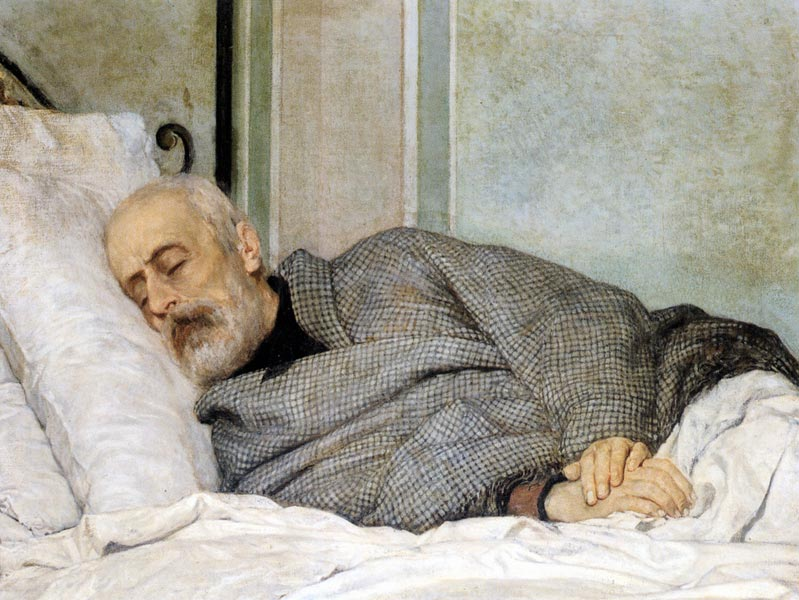
Giuseppe Mazzini Dying (1873)

- Il sacro cuore di Gesù, oil painting
- La casa di don Giovanni Verità, 1855, oil on canvas, 37 x 28, Livorno, museum Civico
- Episodio della guerra del 1859 - Ritorno di bersaglieri italiani da una ricognizione, 1861, oil on canvas, 57,5 x 95, Florence, National Gallery of Modern Art, Palazzo Pitti
- Ritratto di Giuseppe Garibaldi, 1861, oil on canvas, 111 x 78,4, Private collection
- Tra i fiori del giardino, 1862, oil on canvas, 49 x 59, Private collection
- Il primo dolore, 1863, oil on canvas, 39,5 x 50, Genoa, Provincial Palace
- L’educazione al lavoro, 1863, oil painting, 87 x 65, Hotel Montecatini Terme, Tuscany, Private collection
- L’elemosina, 1864, oil on canvas, 71,8 x 124, Private collection
- La nonna, 1865, oil on canvas, 59 x 70, Private collection
- Due bambine che fanno le signore - Divertimento infantile, 1865, oil on canvas, 57,5 x 94, Private collection
- Il canto di uno stornello, 1867, oil on canvas, 158 x 98, Florence, National Gallery of Modern Art, Palazzo Pitti
- Un dopo pranzo, 1868, oil on canvas, 75 x 93,5, Milan, Pinacoteca di Brera
- La visita, 1868, oil on canvas on wood panel, 31 x 60, Rome, National Gallery of Modern Art
- I promessi sposi, 1869, oil on canvas, 33,5 x 77, Milan, Museum of Science of Leonardo da Vinci
- La lettura, oil on paper laid down on wood, Bari, Provincial art-Gallery
- Donna con edera, oil on board, Genoa Nervi, Raccolte Frugone Gallery
- Una madre, 1884, oil on canvas, 191 x 124, Private collection
- Gabbrigiana in piedi, 1888, oil on canvas, 140 x 86, Private collection
- Pagliai al sole, oil on board, 28 x 38, ca 1890, Piacenza, Gallery Ricci Oddi

== Gallery ==
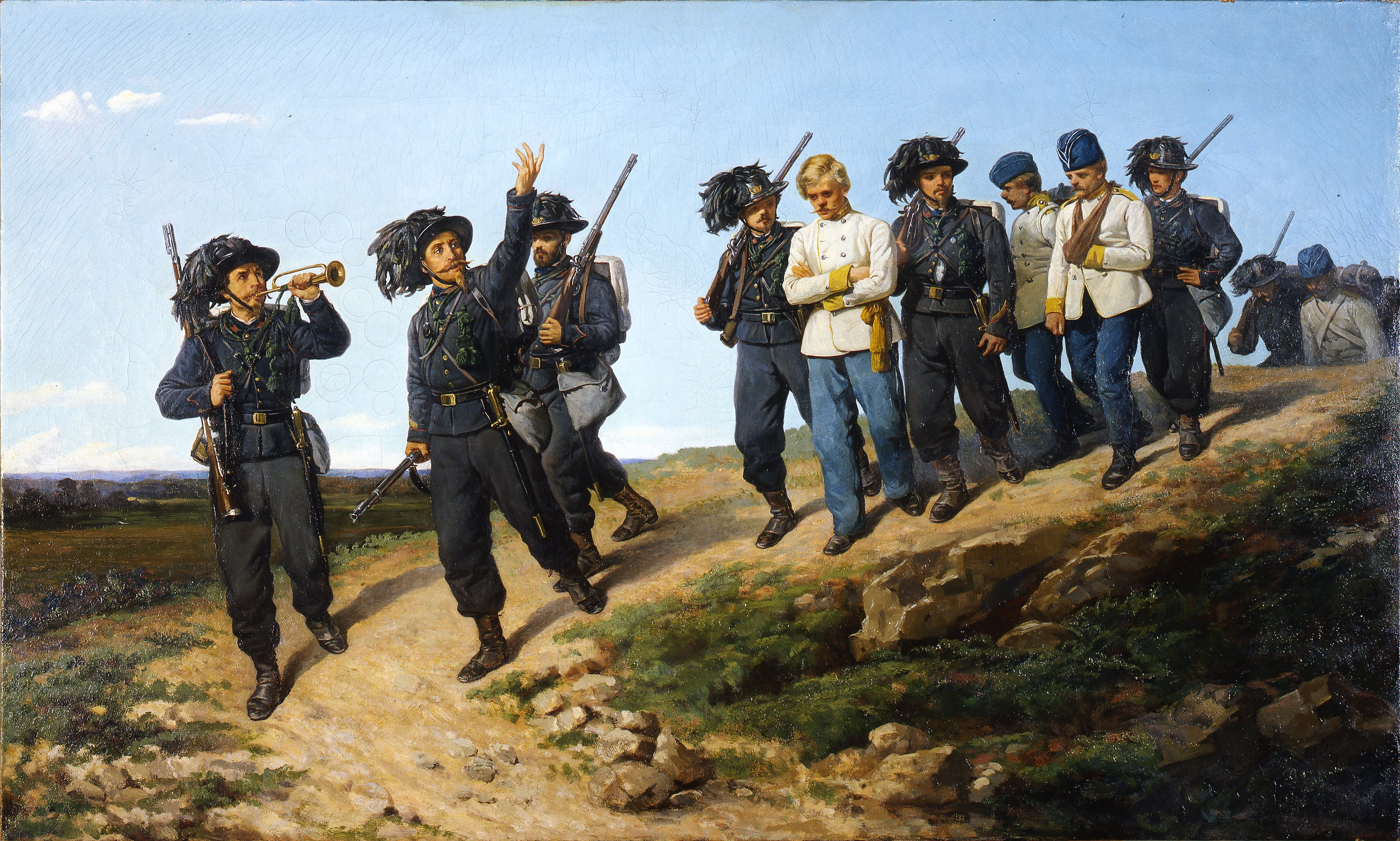
Sharpshooters Leading Prisoners, 1861, Florence, National Gallery of Modern Art, Palazzo Pitti

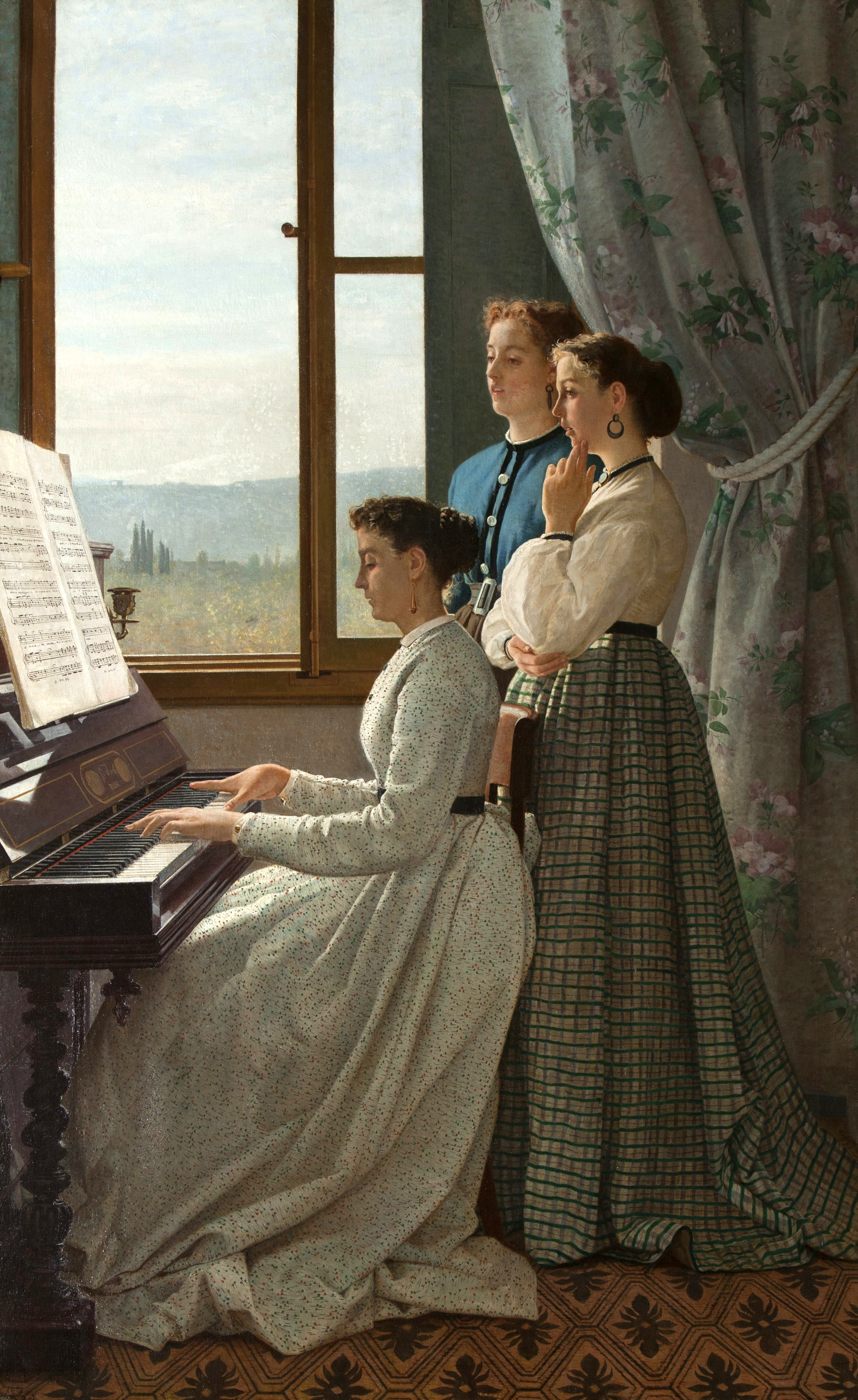
Song of a Starling, 1867, Florence, National Gallery of Modern Art, Palazzo Pitti

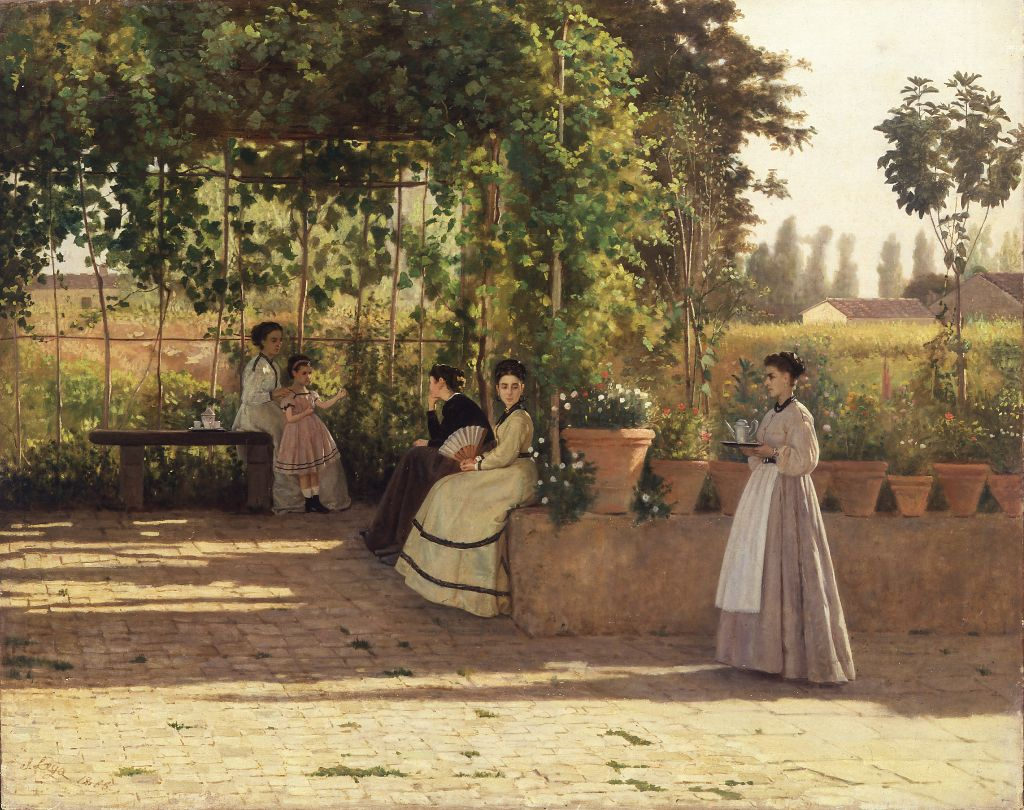
La Pergola, 1868, Milan, Pinacoteca di Brera

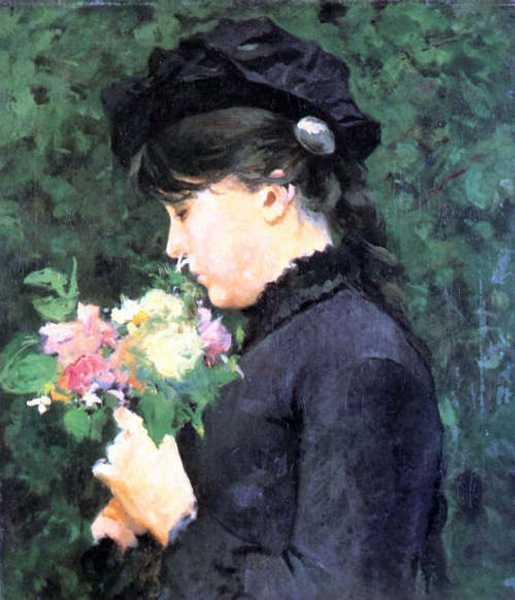
Portrait of Eleonora Tommasi, c. 1884

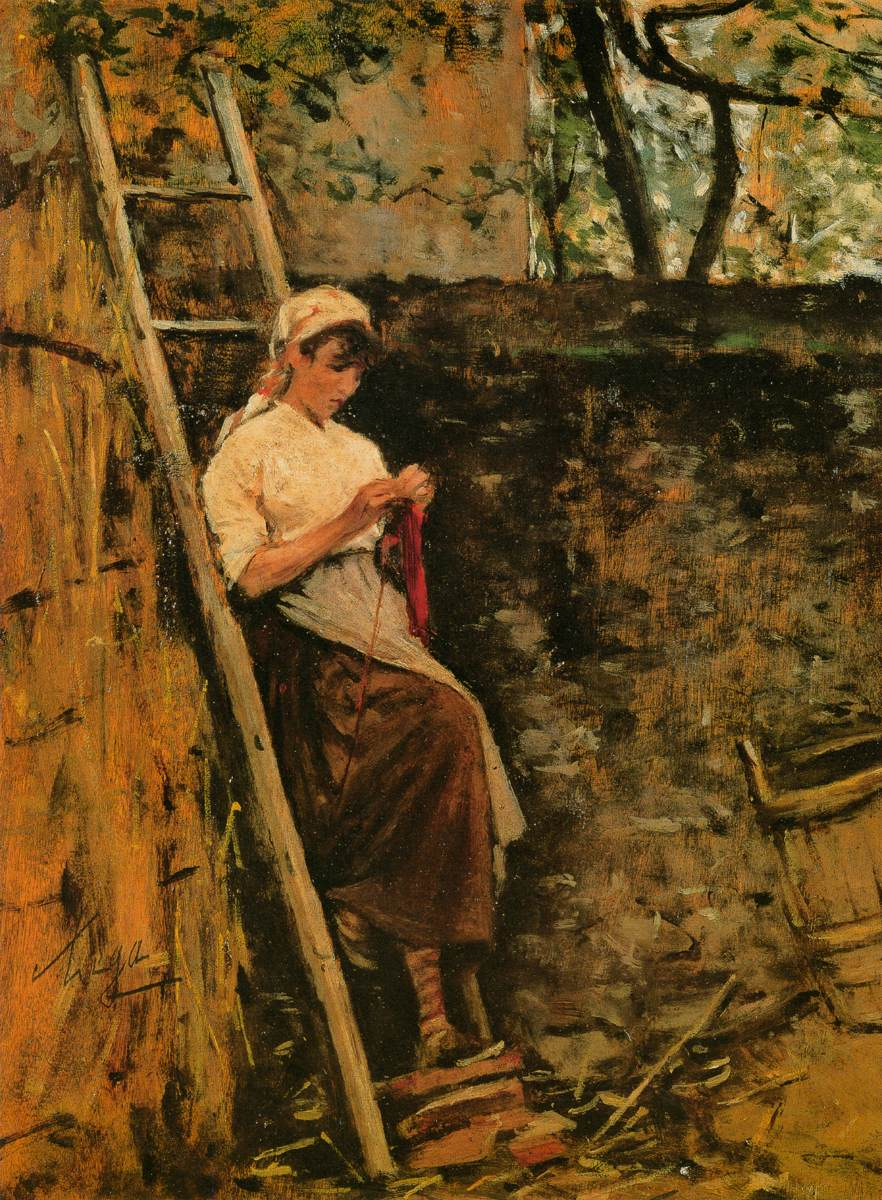
Country Girl Leaning Against a Ladder, c. 1885
