= Serafino De Tivoli =

Italian painter (1826–1892)

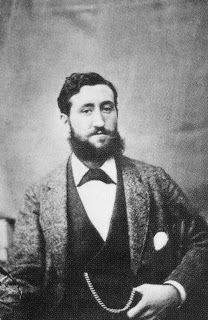
- Serafino De Tivoli in 1875
- Born: 22 February 1825; Livorno, Grand Duchy of Tuscany
- Died: 1 November 1892 (aged 67); Florence, Kingdom of Italy
- Occupation: painter
- Movement: Macchiaioli

Serafino De Tivoli (22 February 1825 – 1 November 1892) was an Italian painter of the Macchiaioli group, often referred to as "the father of the macchia" in recognition of his crucial influence on the group's innovative technique.

== Biography ==
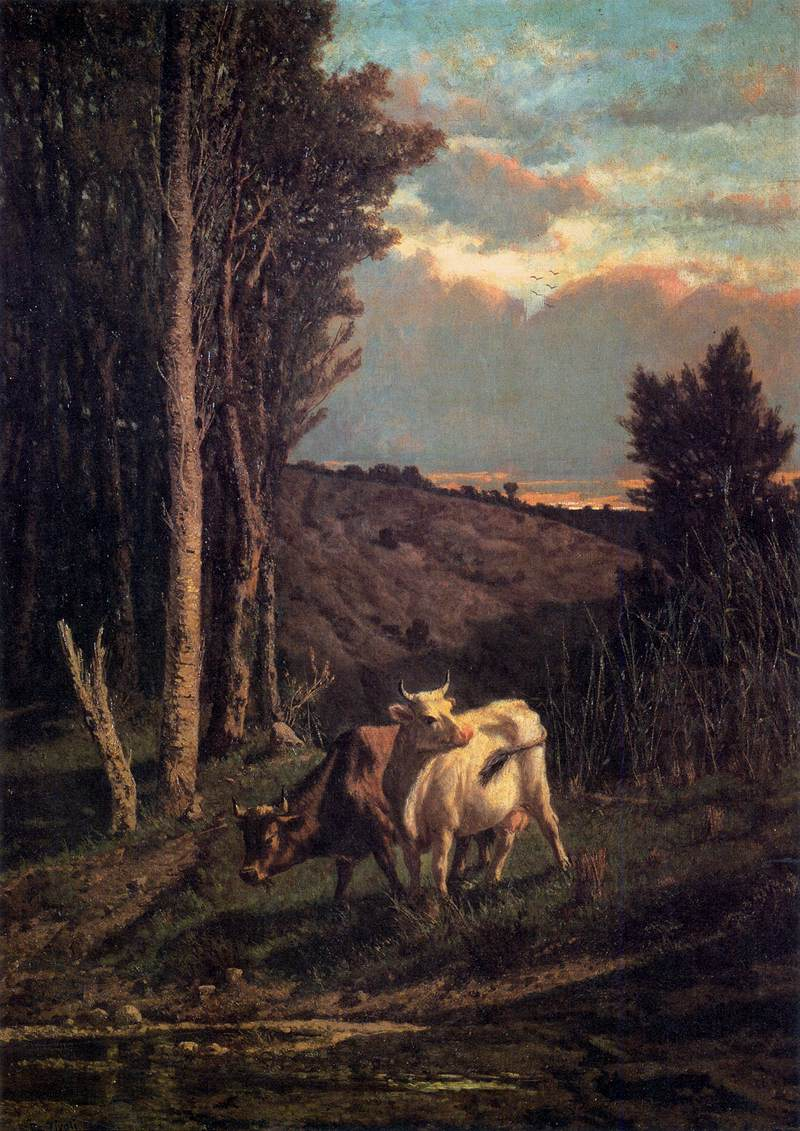
Una pastura (1859)

Serafino De Tivoli was born in Livorno, Grand Duchy of Tuscany in 1826. He was the first son of Abramo Samuel and Fortunata Moro. In 1836, he moved with his family to Florence. After initial study of literature at a religious private school he attended with his younger brother Felice, he began his artistic training under Carlo Markò the Elder.

In 1848, he fought as a Tuscan volunteer for Garibaldi in the Risorgimento, fighting in Curtatone and contributing in 1849 to the defense of the Roman Republic. Returned to Florence after completion of his military duties, he was one of the first to start frequenting the Caffè Michelangiolo, where he quickly became a regular and spent hours discussing political and art topics with other artists, especially those who would later become known as the Macchiaioli. He bonded in particular with Telemaco Signorini, Vito D'Ancona, and the caricaturist Angiolo Tricca. In these years, he focused on the painting of landscapes en plein air, mostly in the Tuscan countryside. To this purpose, in 1853, along with a few other artists, he founded the "Scuola di Staggia", where the artists met for outdoor painting sessions, often painting the same subject and pursuing experimental techniques and the use of colors to depict reality.

In 1855 he exhibited at the Florentine Promotrice exhibition, and in that same year he traveled to Paris for the Exposition Universelle, where he was greatly impressed by the paintings of the Barbizon school. He saw in their realism and powerful chiaroscuro a means of renewing art in the modern age. Upon his return to Florence, he conveyed this new enthusiasm to his friends at the Caffè Michelangiolo, who quickly adopted and elaborated his ideas, and with whom he essentially started the Macchiaioli movement. In recognition of the influence he had on his fellow Florentine artists, Telemaco Signorini called him "the father of the macchia". These years between 1856 and 1862 yielded his best works.

In the following years, he made additional visits to Paris, and in 1863 he exhibited in the Salon des Refusés. After few years living in London with his brother Felice, in 1873 he moved to Paris, where he started frequenting the Café Guerbois and the Café de la Nouvelle-Athènes, thus associating with those artists that will soon found the Impressionism movement. He met such artists as Tissot and Pissarro, and became a friend of Degas. He also associated with Giovanni Boldini, Giuseppe De Nittis, Federico Zandomeneghi, Cristiano Banti, and his friend Vito D'Ancona, who had already moved to Paris in 1867. In 1879 and 1881, he exhibited at the Salon.

He returned to Florence in 1890, where he lived in relative isolation until his death in 1892.

== Selected paintings ==
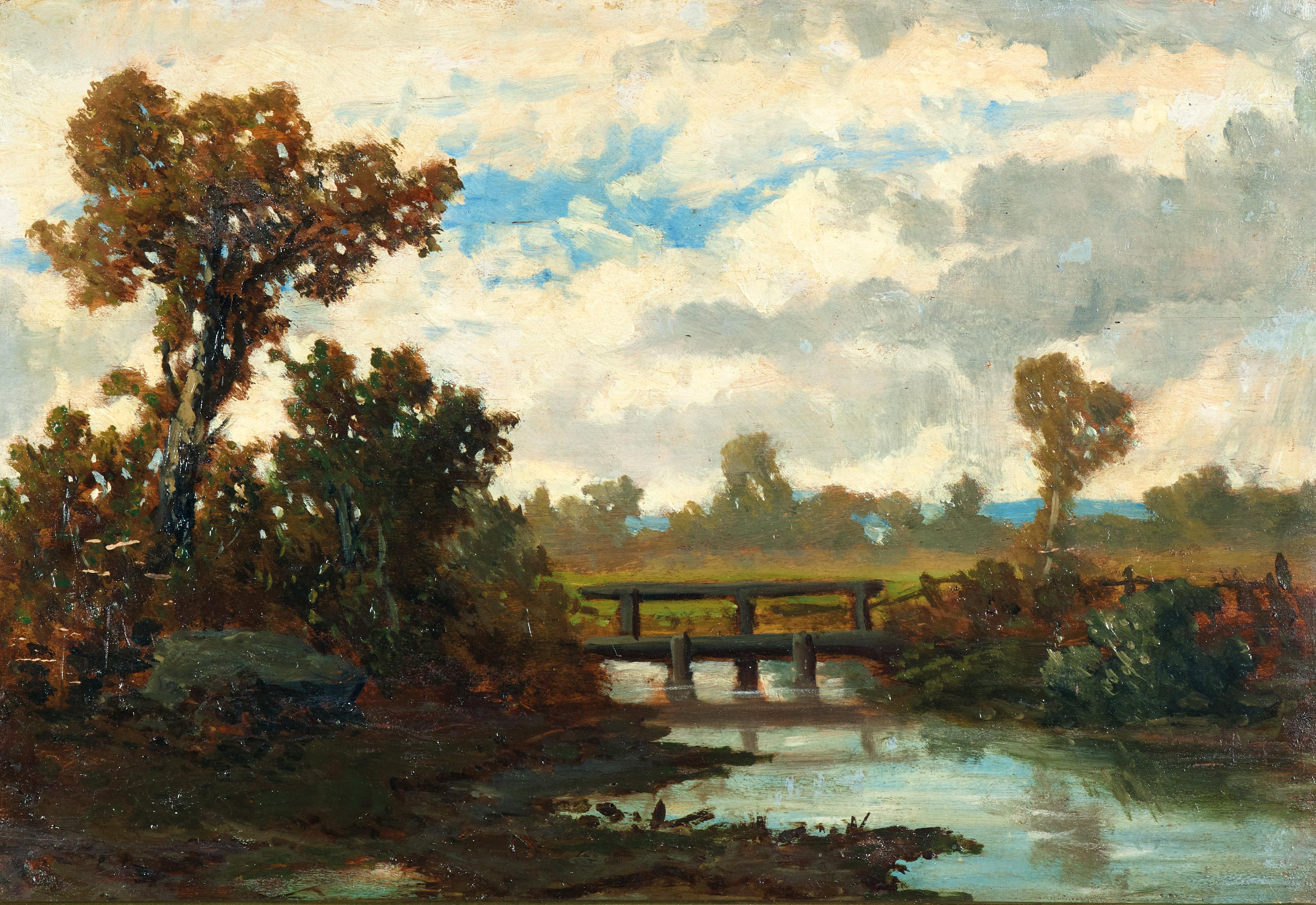
Il ponte di legno (1857-1859)

- Paesaggio con bovi (1855), oil on canvas, Museo civico Giovanni Fattori di Livorno;
- La pesca sul fiume (1855-1856), oil on wood, Pinacoteca Corrado Giaquinto di Bari;
- Paesaggio (1856), oil on canvas, Galleria nazionale d'arte moderna di Roma;
- Paesaggio con cascata (1856), oil on canvas, private collection;
- La questua (1856), oil on canvas, private collection;
- Riposo nel bosco (1857), oil on canvas, private collection;
- Paesaggio sull’Arno (1857), oil on canvas, Galleria d'arte moderna, Palazzo Pitti, Firenze;
- Il ponte di legno, (1857-1859), oil on canvas, private collection;
- Marina con pescatori (1858), oil on canvas, unknown;
- Paese con animali (1858), oil on canvas, private collection;
- Una pastura (1859), oil on canvas, Galleria d'arte moderna, Palazzo Pitti, Firenze;
- Paesaggio con vacche al pascolo (1859), oil on canvas, Galleria d'arte moderna, Palazzo Pitti, Firenze;
- Portico di villa toscana (1859), oil on canvas, unknown;
- Veduta di Villa Salviati (1859), oil on canvas, unknown;
- Veduta del Val d'Arno (Pascolo) (1860), oil on canvas, Galleria d'arte moderna di Torino;
- L’Arno a San Rossore (1860-1864), oil on wood, Pinacoteca Corrado Giaquinto di Bari;
- Ritratto della signora Giovannini (1860-1865), oil on canvas, Galleria d'arte moderna, Palazzo Pitti, Firenze;
- Ritratto del bimbo Giovannini (1860-1865), oil on canvas, Galleria d'arte moderna, Palazzo Pitti, Firenze;
- Grano maturo (1860-1870), oil on canvas, Galleria d'arte moderna, Palazzo Pitti, Firenze;
- Al guado (1862), oil on canvas, Galleria d'arte moderna, Palazzo Pitti, Firenze;
- L’Arno alle Cascine (1863), oil on wood, private collection;
- La lettera alla mamma (1864), oil on canvas, Galleria d'arte moderna, Palazzo Pitti, Firenze;
- Campagna francese (1875), oil on wood, private collection;
- Natura morta con frutta (1875-1879), oil on canvas, Galleria d'arte moderna, Palazzo Pitti, Firenze;
- La Senna a Bougival (1880), oil on canvas, private collection;

== Sources ==
- Broude, Norma (1987). The Macchiaioli: Italian Painters of the Nineteenth Century. New Haven and London: Yale University Press. ISBN 0-300-03547-0
- Steingräber, E., & Matteucci, G. (1984). The Macchiaioli: Tuscan Painters of the Sunlight: 14 March -20 April 1984. New York: Stair Sainty Matthiesen in association with Matthiesen, London. OCLC 70337478
