= Vito D'Ancona =

Italian painter (1825–1884)

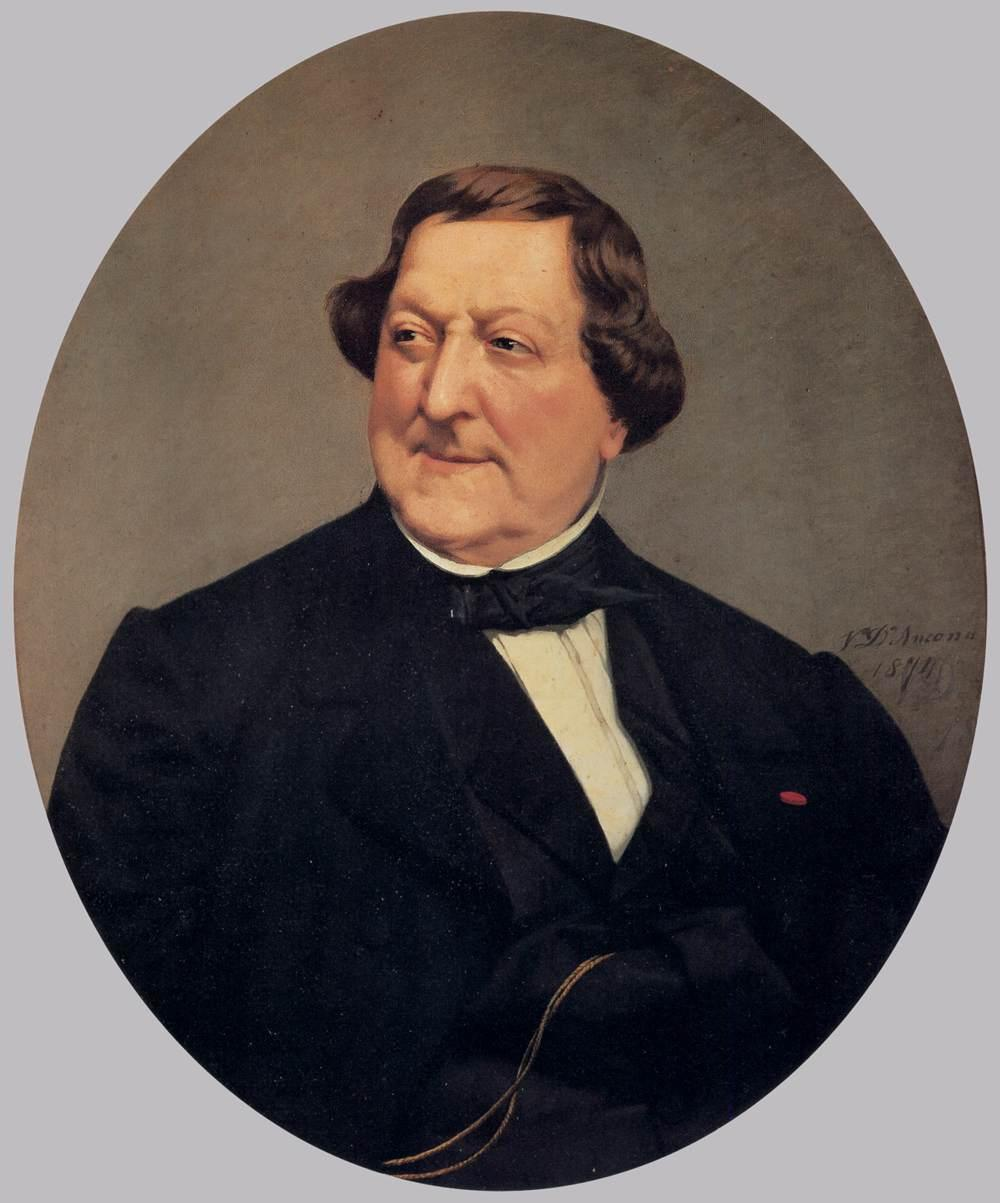
Vito D'Ancona, Gioacchino Rossini, 1874. Palazzo Pitti

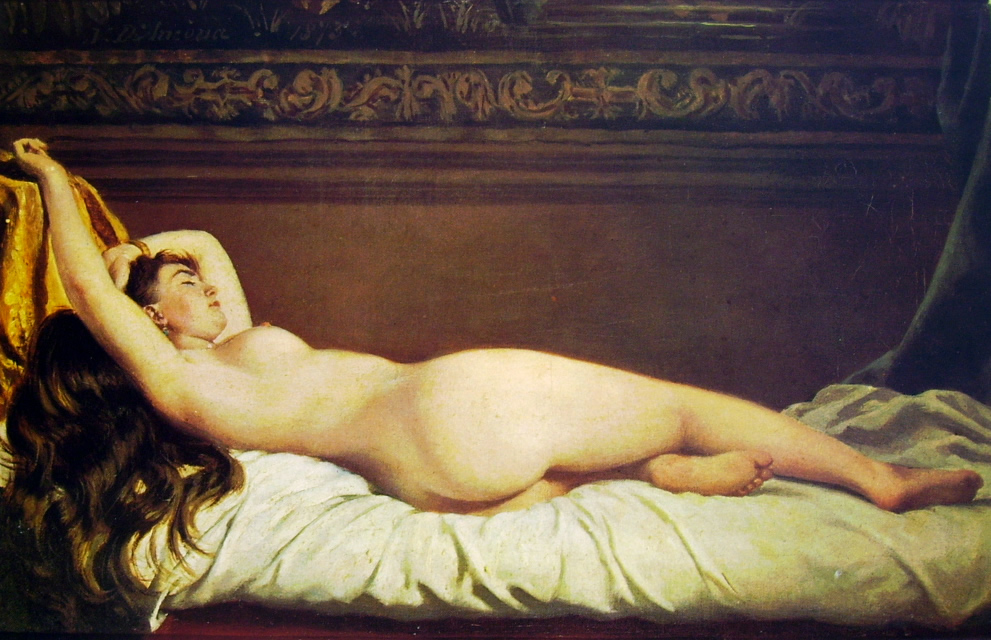
Vito D'Ancona, Nude, 1873. Galleria d'Arte Moderna, Milan, Italy

Vito D'Ancona (August 12, 1825 – January 9, 1884) was an Italian painter of the Macchiaioli group.

He was born in Pesaro to a wealthy Jewish family. He began his artistic training in Florence, and in 1844 was admitted to the Accademia di Belle Arti, where he studied under Giuseppe Bezzuoli. He became friends with Serafino De Tivoli, and joined him in painting landscapes en plein air. In 1848 he fought as a Tuscan volunteer for Garibaldi in the Risorgimento. During the 1850s he became acquainted with the artists who frequented the Caffè Michelangiolo in Florence, who would soon be known as the Macchiaioli.

D'Ancona achieved success as a portrait painter, and few of his landscape paintings can be traced today. His Woman at the Races (ca. 1873) reveals the influence of Japonisme he had absorbed while living in Paris between 1867 and 1874. Suffering from the effects of syphilis, D'Ancona's health disintegrated in the mid-1870s, and he ceased painting in 1878. He died in Florence on January 9, 1884.

Collections holding works by Vito D'Ancona include the Galleria Nazionale d'Arte Moderna, Rome, and the Israel Museum, Jerusalem.
