= Vincenzo Cabianca =

Italian painter

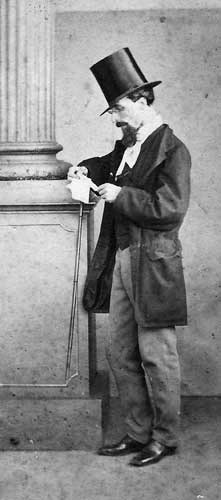
Vincenzo Cabianca

Vincenzo Cabianca (June 21, 1827 – March 21, 1902) was an Italian painter of the Macchiaioli group.

== Biography ==
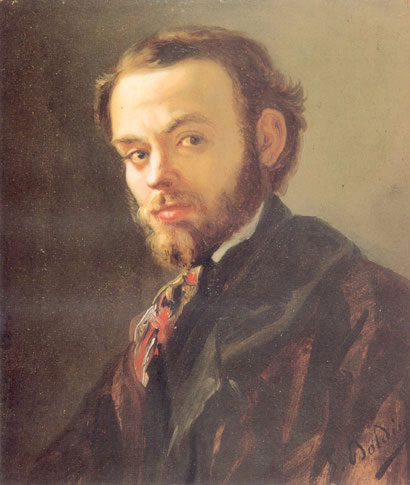
Portrait of Cabianca by Giovanni Boldini

He was born in Verona in modest circumstances. He began his artistic training at the Verona Academy under Giovanni Caliari, and then studied at the Venice Academy from 1845 to 1847. An admirer of Giuseppe Mazzini, he became associated with the Young Italy movement and was taken prisoner while participating in the defense of Bologna in 1848. After his release he lived in Venice from 1849 until 1853.

During the 1850s Cabianca became acquainted with the artists, including Adriano Cecioni, Cristiano Banti, and Telemaco Signorini, who frequented the Caffè Michelangiolo in Florence, who would be known as the Macchiaioli. He became a friend of Signorini, and travelled with Signorini and Banti to Paris. His friend's influence led Cabianca to turn away from genre paintings towards a bolder realism, beginning in 1858. Like the other Macchiaioli, he painted landscapes en plein air, but he was more reluctant than his friends were to abandon historical and literary subjects.

Cabianca emphasized powerful value contrasts in his paintings. Cecioni described him as "the most declared, violent and uninhibited macchiaiolo." Angelo de Gubernatis, who termed the Macchiaioli "enemies of all conventionalism and accurate researchers of effects", described Cabianca as principally interested in the effects of sunlight. Gottardo Garollo in his Dizionario Biografico describes Cabianca as a painter of the "effects of the Sun".

Many of his paintings depict nuns; a well-known example is Le monachine (The nuns; 1861–62, Turin exhibition). Other works of the 1860s include La Mandriana and il Porcile al sole (1860). Returning from travels to Tuscany and Paris in 1864, he domiciled in Parma from 1864 to 1868, then moved to Rome.

Among his other works are Il bagno fra gli scogli; Sant'Angelo all' Isola di Giudecca; Reminiscenze del mare; Gondola bruna; La neve in Ciociaria; Le mura del convento; and Sotto il portico dei barattieri a Venice. At Naples in 1877, he exhibited Piccola via presso Perugia; La neve; Una casa ad Anacapri; and Reminiscenze d'Amalfi. At Rome in 1883 he displayed Rocca di Papa; Il caligo a Venice; Sul far del giorno; La pace del Chiostro; and Una sera sulla laguna. He also painted in watercolors, including La neve a Venice, Il fait sa cour, and Sulla marina di Viareggio.

The works of Cabianca's later years show the influence of the Symbolists and the Pre-Raphaelites. He died in Rome on March 21, 1902.

Collections holding works by Vincenzo Cabianca include the Galleria Nazionale d'Arte Moderna, Rome, and the Brooklyn Museum.

== Selected paintings ==
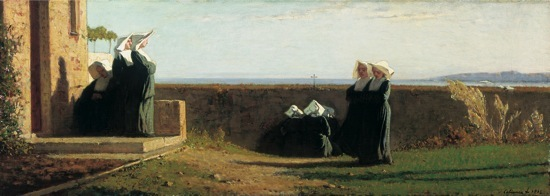
The Nuns (1861)

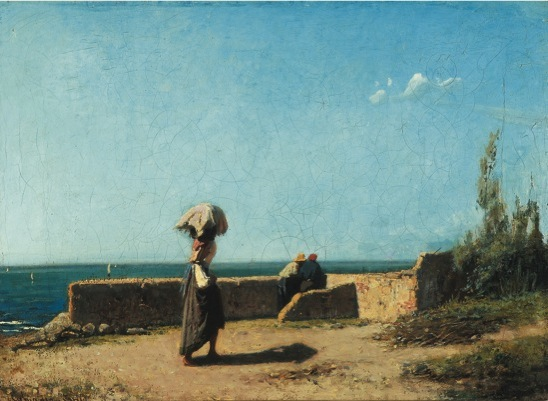
Seafront (1860)

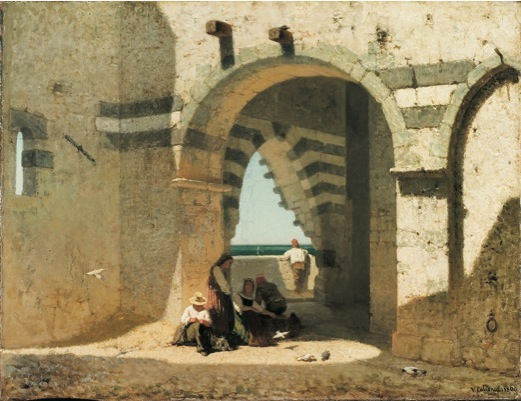
Church of St. Peter in Porto Venere (1860)

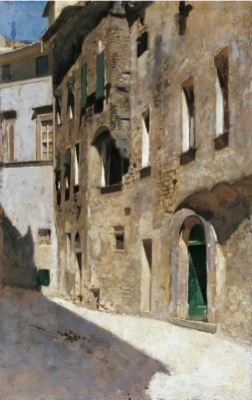
Sunlight (1870)

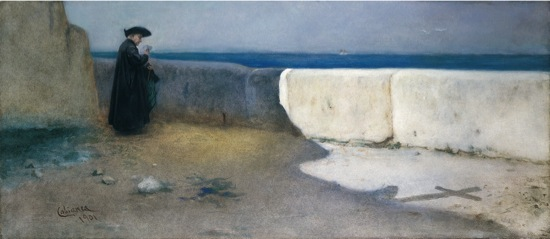
Morning (1901)
