= Giuseppe Abbati =

Italian painter

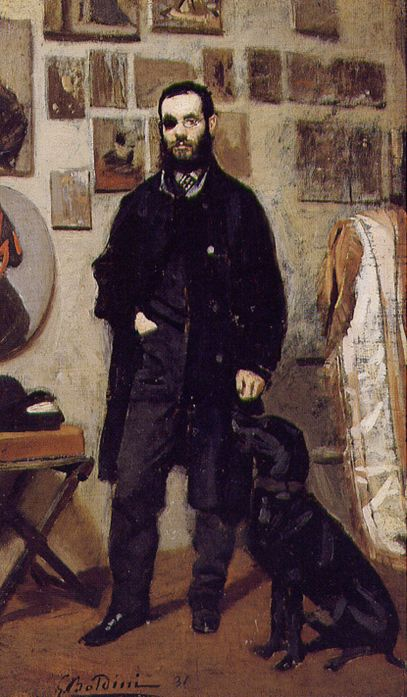
- Born: Giuseppe Abbati; January 13, 1836; Naples, Kingdom of the Two Sicilies
- Died: February 21, 1868 (aged 32); Florence, Kingdom of Italy
- Known for: Painting
- Movement: Macchiaioli

Giuseppe Abbati (January 13, 1836 – February 21, 1868) was an Italian painter who belonged to the group known as the Macchiaioli.

== Biography ==
Abbati was born in Naples. He received early training in painting from his father Vincenzo, who specialized in paintings of architectural interiors, and Abbati's own early paintings were interiors. He participated in Garibaldi's 1860 campaign, suffering the loss of his right eye at the Battle of Capua. Afterwards he moved to Florence where, at the Caffè Michelangiolo, he met Giovanni Fattori, Silvestro Lega, and the rest of the artists who would soon be dubbed the Macchiaioli.

At the National Exposition in Florence in 1861, Abbati was awarded a medal for his interior views—but refused to accept it, as a gesture of protest against the composition of the jury. Subsequently, he became attracted to the practice of painting landscapes en plein air. His activity as a painter was interrupted during 1866 when he enlisted again in the army for the Third Independence War, during which he was captured by the Austrians and held in Croatia.

Returning to civilian life at the end of the year, he moved to Castelnuovo della Misericordia and spent the final year of his life painting in the countryside. Abbati died at the age of thirty-two in Florence after his dog bit him, infecting him with rabies.

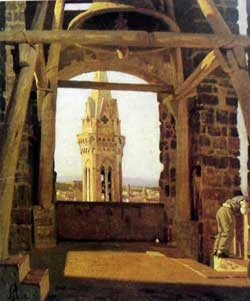
Giuseppe Abbati, The Tower of the Palazzo del Podestà, 1865, oil on wood, 39 x 32 cm.

His paintings are characterized by a bold treatment of light effects. He often painted a luminous landscape scene as seen through the doorway of a darkened interior, as in the View from the Wine Cellar of Diego Martelli (1866). Some of his late landscapes, such as the View of Castiglioncello (1867), are in the greatly elongated horizontal format often favored by the Macchiaioli.
