= Benedetto Servolini =

Italian painter (1805–1879)

Benedetto Servolini (25 February 1805 in Florence – 7 June 1879 ibid.) was an Italian painter, mainly of historical subjects.

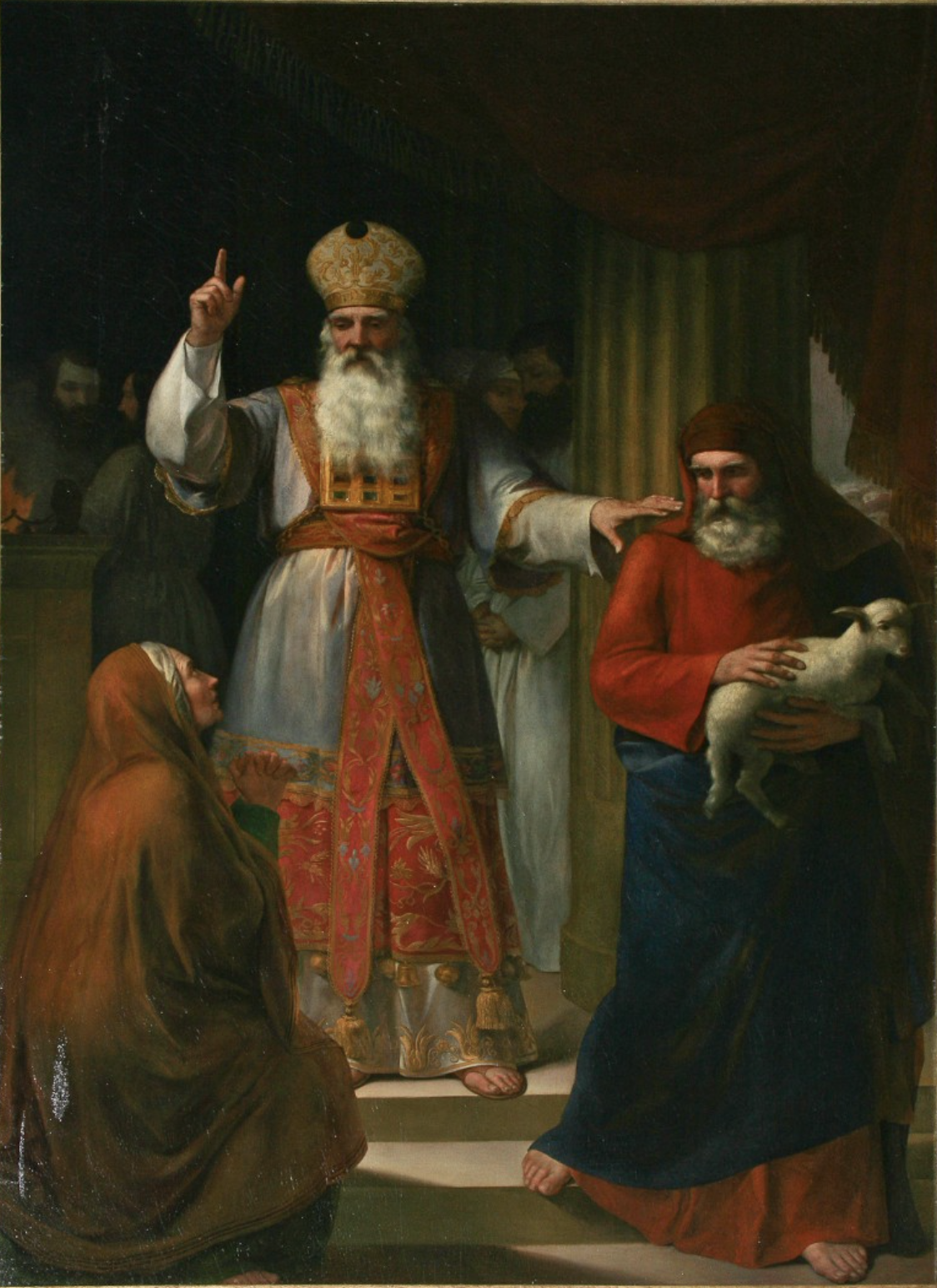
Joachim and Anna, the parents of the Virgin Mary, are refused entry to the Temple (1855)

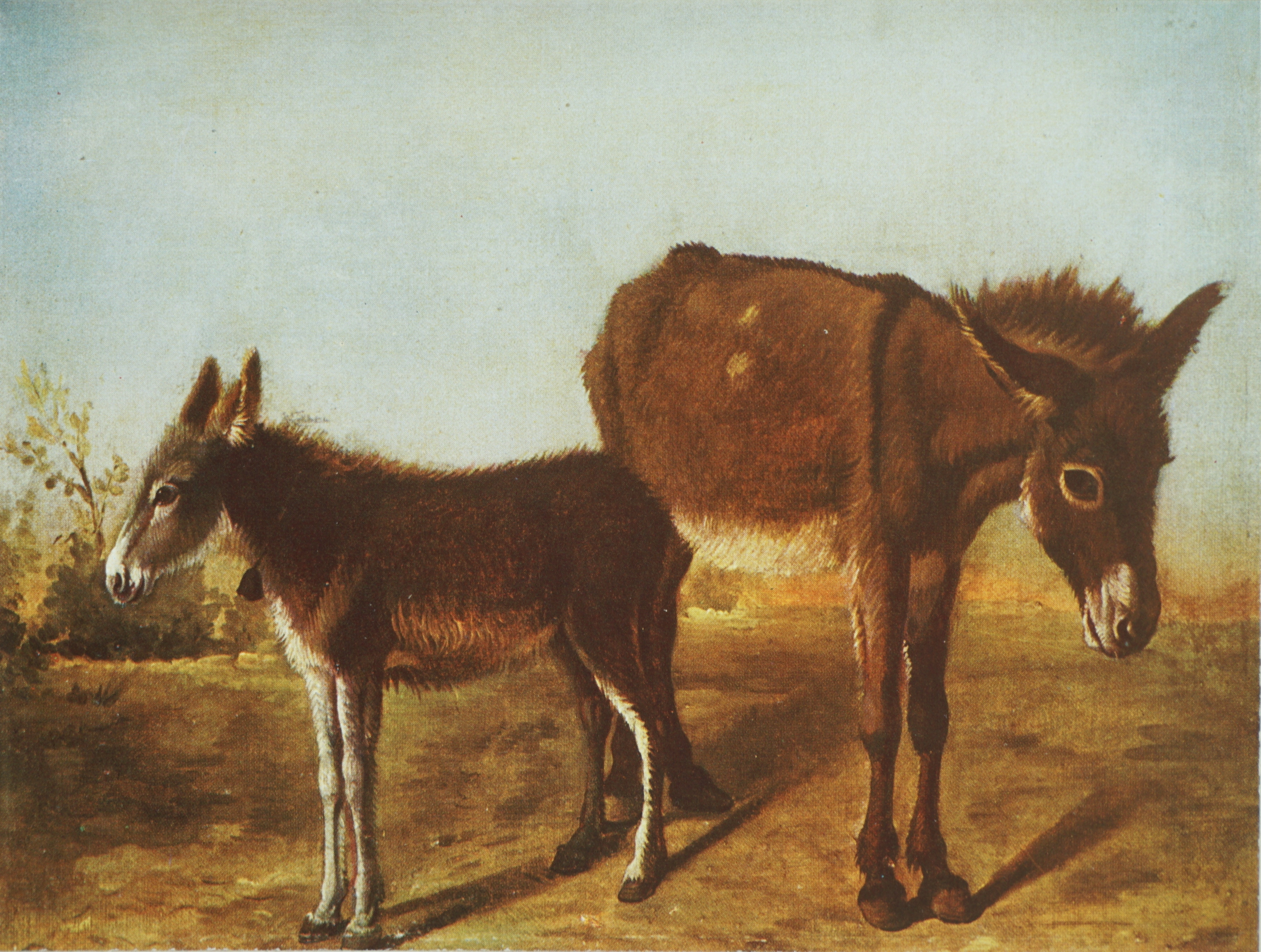
Maternità (ca. 1857)

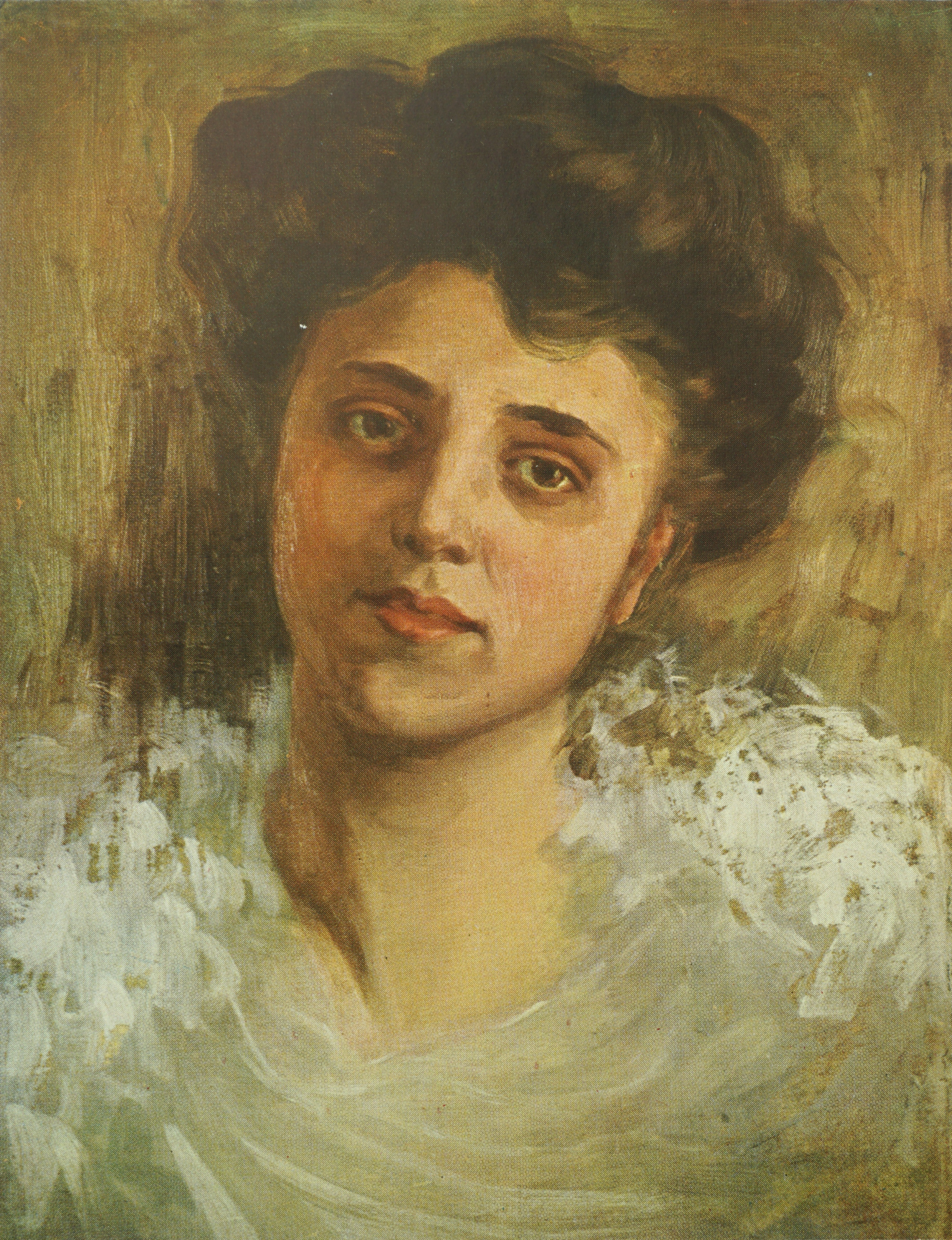
Ritratto di giovane signora N. D. Caterina Matzeu (1857/1858)

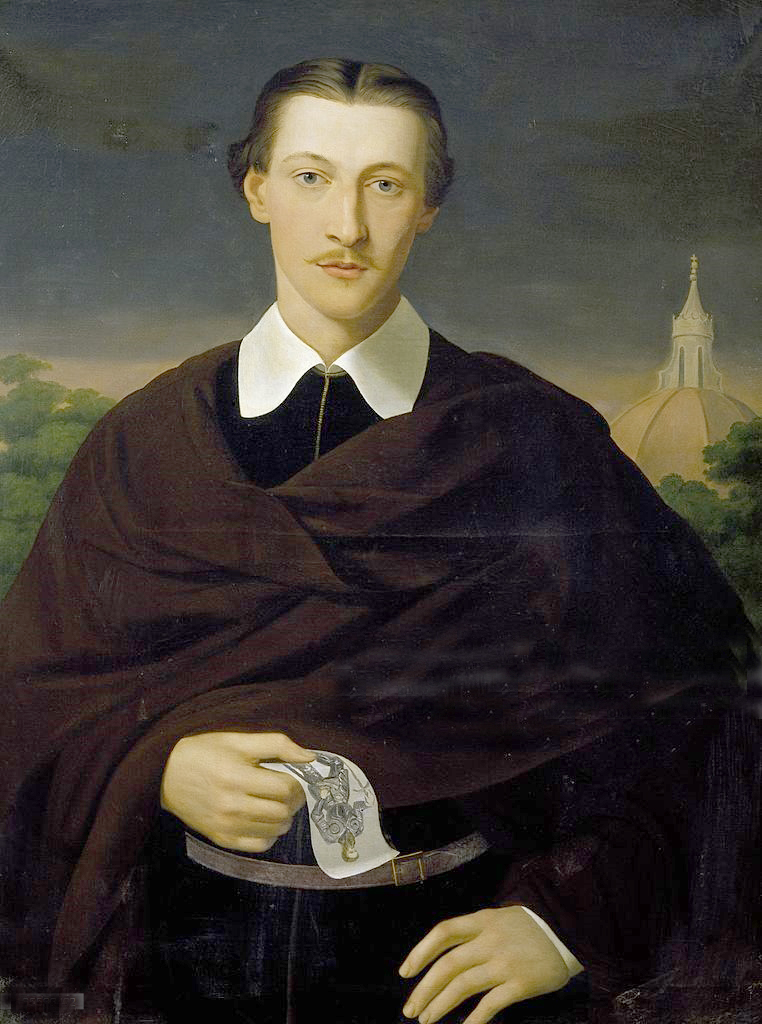
Portrait of the young Frederick Stibbert (1858/1860)

His father recognised his aptitude for drawing and perhaps at the suggestion of his relative Giuseppe Servolini sent him 1820 to study at the Academy of Florence. A work he had executed in 1822 at the age of seventeen, Filippo II sorprende la regina nella prigione del figlio, was shown in the Florentine Exhibition of 1828. Further paintings with historical subjects were shown in the Florentine Exhibitions of 1829, 1931 and 1832 and the Francesca da Rimini of 1830 was exhibited the following year in Milan.

He won a scholarship to continue his studies 1832 in Rome, returning 1835 to Florence. In 1838 Servolini was nominated "assistant master of Drawing" to Tommaso Gazzarrini and a year later professor at the Academy followed by his nomination 1844 as assistant to the 'master of Painting', who was then Giuseppe Bezzuoli, the latter however frequently absent and Servolini taught on his behalf. Bezzuoli died in 1855 and Servolini succeeded him in this position until 1860 when he was appointed professor for the higher teaching of painting, alongside Enrico Pollastrini, at that time director of the Academy, and Antonio Ciseri. He held this position until 1874, when he was first placed on temporary leave and then retired and paid off, while retaining his rank, office and study rooms in the school until his death.

In the eighteen-fifties and sixties the Academy was in crisis with a "war against the Academy" by the new Società Promotrice that organised their exhibition every year in Florence with "bitter disputes dividing the artists, factional critics and an aggressively harnessed academy". Servolini withdrew, isolating himself and became largely forgotten but it gave him the chance of moving away from academic fashion towards a different world which he painted in an entirely different style (Maternità, Ritratto di giovane signora N. D. Caterina Matzeu)

Servolini had been entrusted with the education of a young man from a wealthy English family, which had naturalised in Florence: Frederick Stibbert who became his friend and patron commissioning portraits and large historical paintings and to visit Venice, Milan and Paris. At Servolini's death Frederick Stibbert purchased a burial place in the Antella cemetery and provided for the funeral honours. A number of his paintings are stored in the Stibbert Museum.
