= Macchiaioli =

19th-century Italian art movement

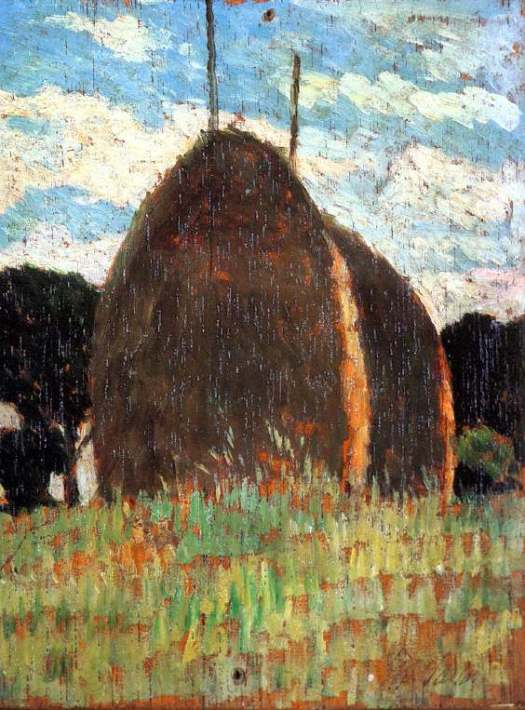
Hay Stacks by Giovanni Fattori, a leading artist in the Macchiaioli movement

The Macchiaioli (Italian pronunciation: [makkjaˈjɔːli]) were a group of Italian painters active in Tuscany in the second half of the nineteenth century. They strayed from antiquated conventions taught by the Italian art academies, and did much of their painting outdoors in order to capture natural light, shade, and colour. This practice relates the Macchiaioli to the French Impressionists who came to prominence a few years later, although the Macchiaioli pursued somewhat different purposes. The most notable artists of this movement were Giuseppe Abbati, Cristiano Banti, Odoardo Borrani, Vincenzo Cabianca, Adriano Cecioni, Vito D'Ancona, Serafino De Tivoli, Giovanni Fattori, Raffaello Sernesi, Silvestro Lega, and Telemaco Signorini.

== The movement ==
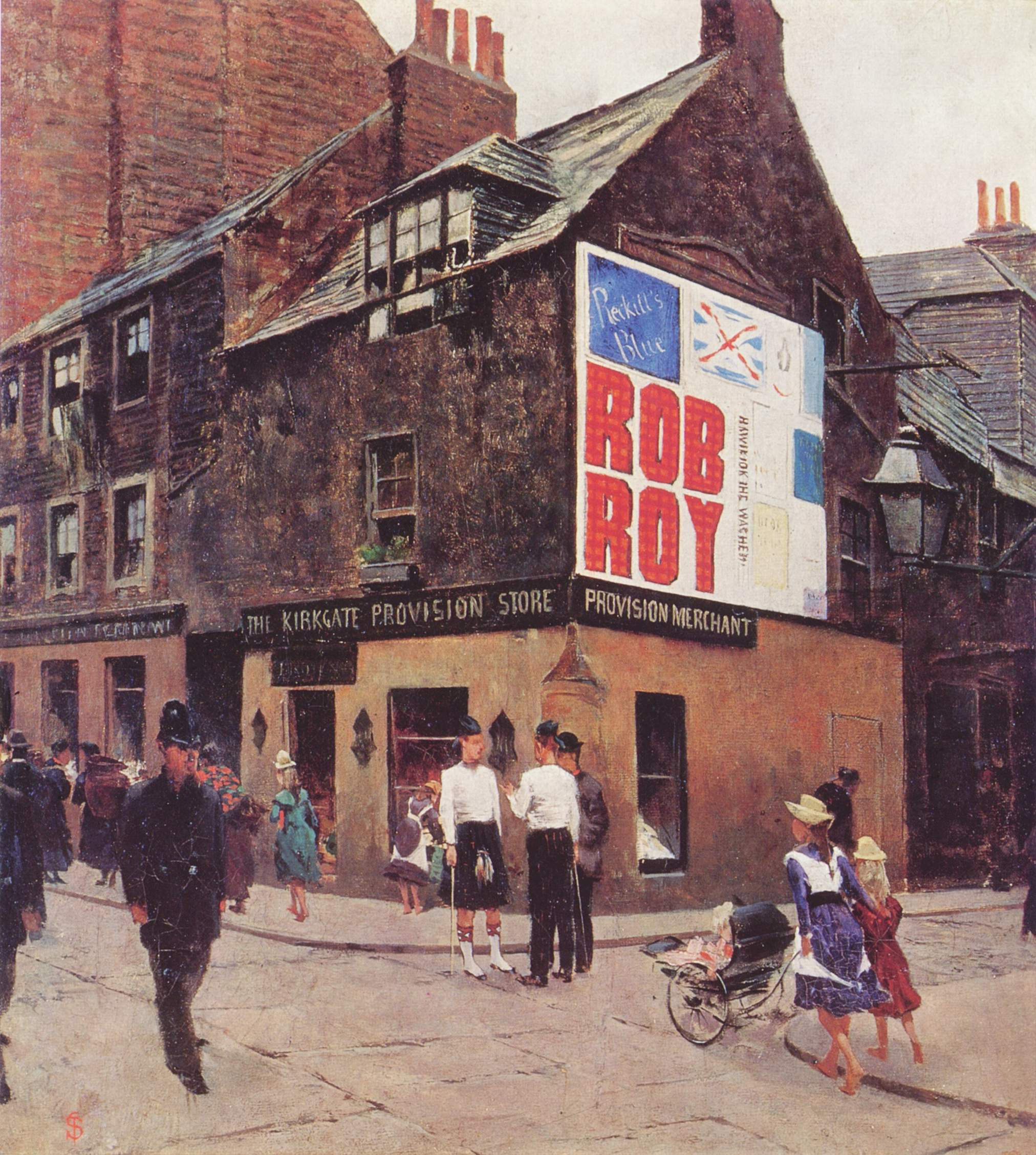
Telemaco Signorini, Leith, 1881, Galleria d'Arte Moderna, Florence

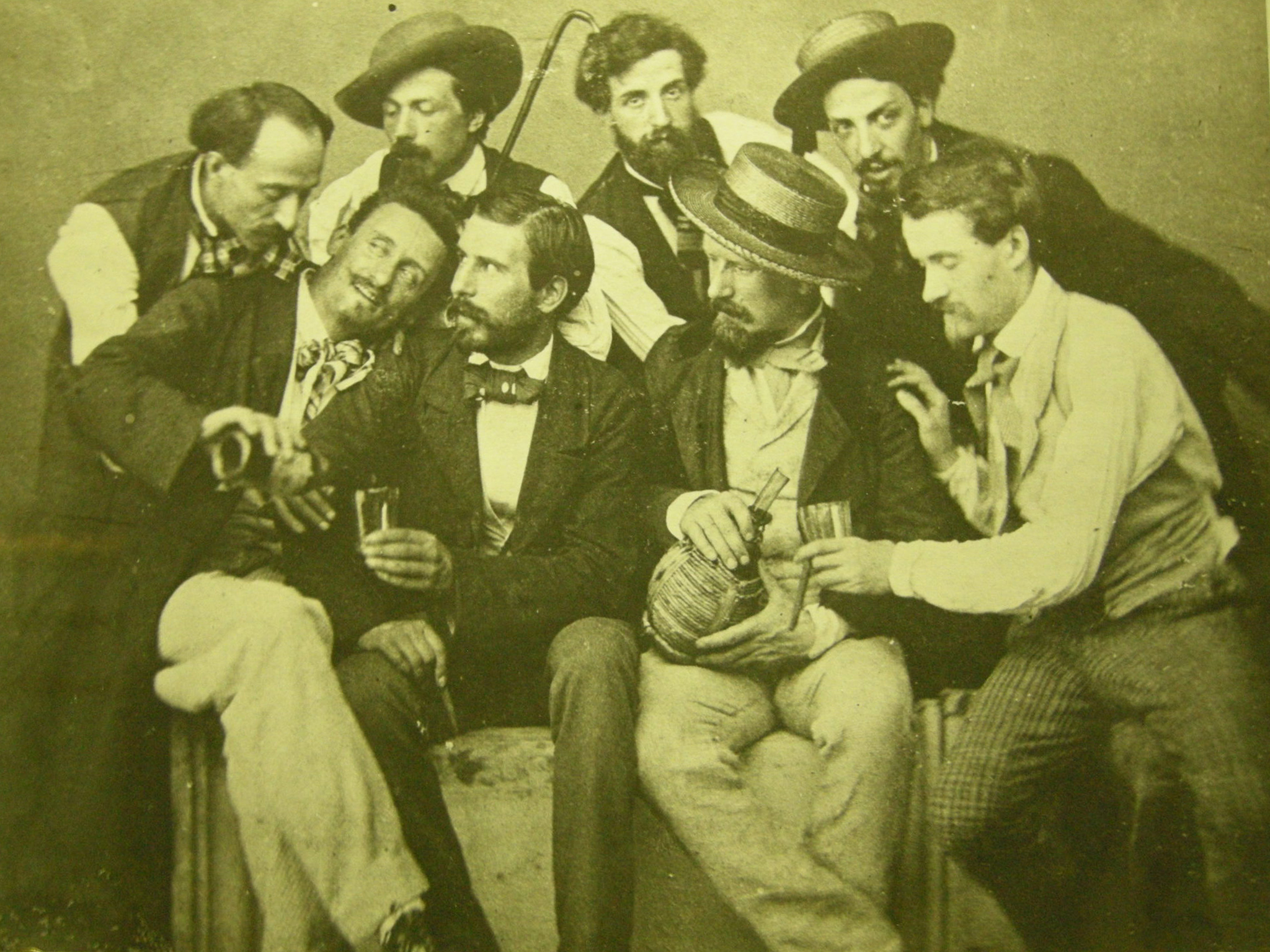
Macchiaioli at the Caffè Michelangiolo c. 1856

The movement originated with a small group of artists, many of whom had been revolutionaries in the uprisings of 1848. In the late 1850s, the artists met regularly at the Caffè Michelangiolo in Florence to discuss art and politics. These idealistic young men, dissatisfied with the art of the academies, shared a wish to reinvigorate Italian art by emulating the bold tonal structure they admired in such old masters as Rembrandt, Caravaggio and Tintoretto. In addition, they found inspiration in the paintings of their French contemporaries of the Barbizon school thanks to Serafino De Tivoli (referred to as the father of the Macchiaioli's technique by his friend Telemaco Signorini), who brought those influences to the Caffe' Michelangiolo after his trip to Paris for the Exposition Universelle in 1855.

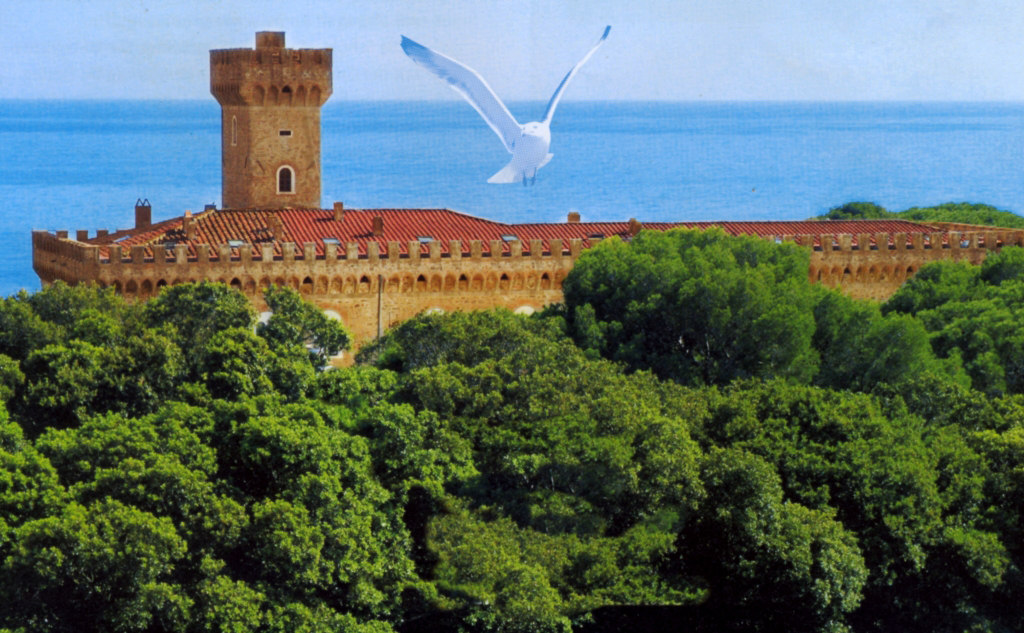
Castiglioncello: the Macchiaioli art-movement had one focus in the "school of Castiglioncello" (Etruscan Coast).

The Macchiaioli's group believed that areas of light and shadow, or "macchie" (literally patches or spots) were the chief components of a work of art. Their procedure juxtaposed spots of different colors (even relatively large at times) in such a way to contrast light and shade. Such a representation of light becomes the main way of shaping the painted subject, whose finer details become irrelevant and often neglected. The word macchia was commonly used by Italian artists and critics in the nineteenth century to describe the sparkling quality of a drawing or painting, whether due to a sketchy and spontaneous execution or to the harmonious breadth of its overall effect.

In its early years the new movement was ridiculed. A hostile review published on November 3, 1862, in the journal Gazzetta del Popolo marks the first appearance in print of the term Macchiaioli. The term carried several connotations: it mockingly implied that the artists' finished works were no more than sketches, and recalled the phrase "darsi alla macchia", meaning, idiomatically, to hide in the bushes or scrubland. The artists did, in fact, paint much of their work in these wild areas. This sense of the name also identified the artists with outlaws, reflecting the traditionalists' view that new school of artists was working outside the rules of art, according to the strict laws defining artistic expression at the time.

The Macchiaioli group were the first independent group of artists who developed a style of painting essentially based on the investigation and representation of light. For this reason, they have often been compared to the Impressionists, whose movement started in Paris roughly fifteen years after the Macchiaioli. However, the Macchiaioli did not go as far as their younger French colleagues in the pursuit of optical effects. Erich Steingräber says that the Macchiaioli "declined to divide up their palette into the components of the colour-spectrum, and did not paint blue shadows. This is why their pictures lack the all-penetrating light that eclipses colours and contours and gives rise to the 'vibrism' peculiar to Impressionist painting. The independent identity of the individual figures is unimpaired."

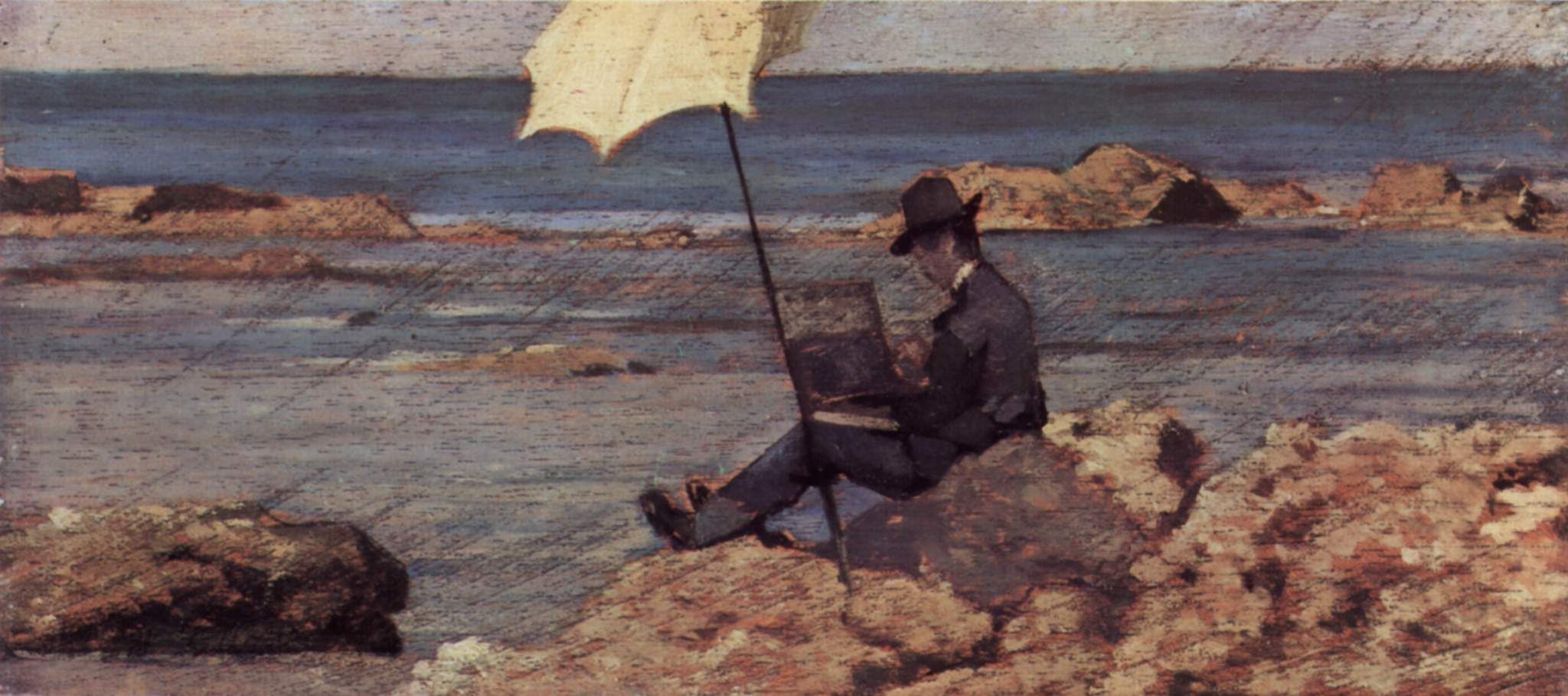
Giovanni Fattori, Silvestro Lega painting at Riva al Mare, 1866–67, Oil on panel, 12.5 x 21 cm.

The Macchiaioli did not follow the Impressionists' practice of finishing relatively large paintings entirely en plein air, but rather they painted small sketches out-of-doors and used them as the basis for works eventually finished in the studio. Sketches painted on relatively small board panels (often fitting into standard cigar boxes), and where the "macchia" technique is mostly exemplified, represent a sort of trademark of the Macchiaioli's movement.

The verdict that the Macchiaioli were "failed impressionists" has been countered by an alternative view which places the Macchiaioli in a category of their own, a decade or so ahead of the Parisian impressionists. This interpretation views the Macchiaioli as early modernists, with their broad theories of painting capturing the essence of subsequent movements that would not see the light of day for another decade or more. In this view the Macchiaioli emerge as being very much embedded in their social fabric and context, literally fighting alongside Giuseppe Garibaldi on behalf of the Risorgimento and its ideals. As such, their works provide comments on various socio-political topics, including Jewish emancipation, prisons and hospitals, and women's conditions, including the plight of war widows and life behind the lines.

Many of the artists of the Macchiaioli died in penury, achieving fame only towards the end of the 19th century. Today the work of the Macchiaioli is much better known in Italy than elsewhere; much of the work is held, outside the public record, in private collections there.

Other painters, such as Luigi and Flavio Bertelli and Antonino Sartini, were influenced by this movement, without being a full part of it.

The Macchiaioli were the subject of an exhibition at the Chiostro del Bramante in Rome, October 11, 2007 – February 24, 2008, which traveled to the Villa Bardini in Florence, March 19 – June 22, 2008. An exhibition in Venice, at the Istituto Veneto di Scienze, Lettere ed Arti showed the capolavori della collezione Mario Taragoni from March 8 — July 27, 2008. Another exhibition of the Macchiaioli was held at the Terme Tamerici in Montecatini Terme, August 12, 2009 – March 18, 2010. The Musée de l'Orangerie in Paris mounted an exhibition of the Macchiaioli April 10 – July 22, 2013.

== Gallery ==
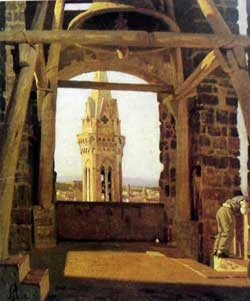
Giuseppe Abbati, The Tower of the Palazzo del Podestà, 1865, oil on wood

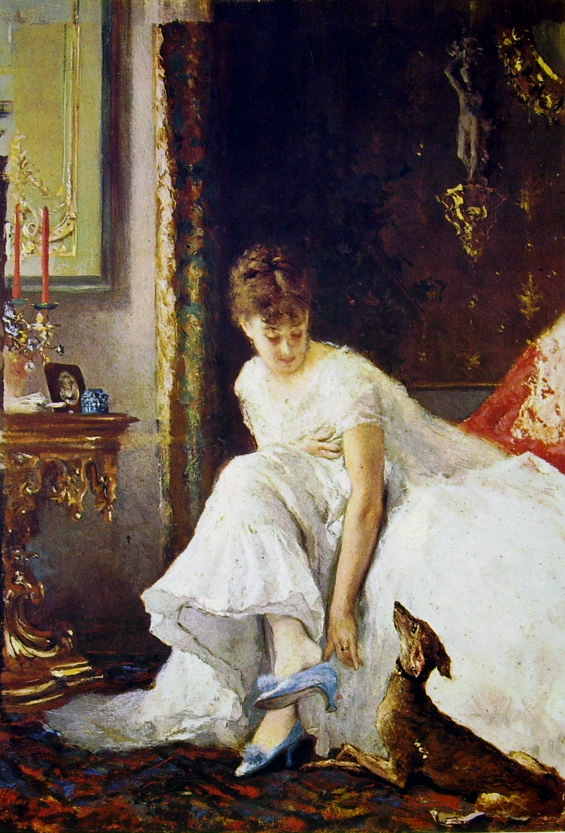
Vito D'Ancona, Lady in white, oil on canvas, Modern art gallery of Milan.

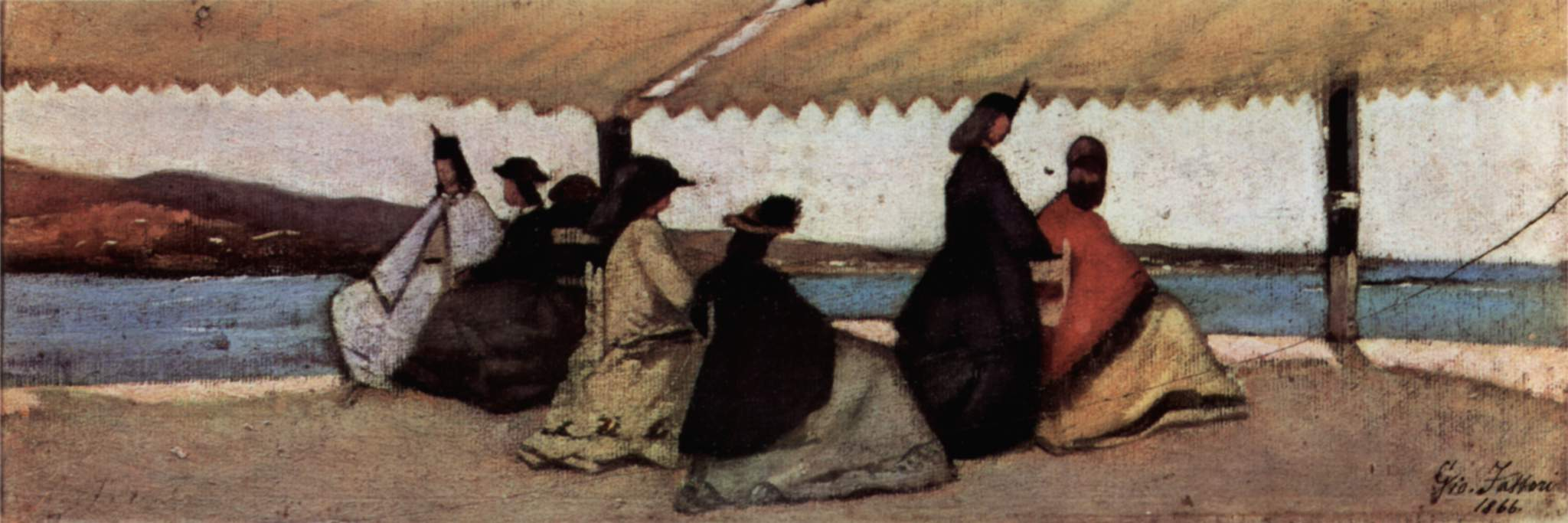
Giovanni Fattori, La Rotonda di Palmieri, 1866, oil on wood, Florence, Galleria d'Arte Moderna

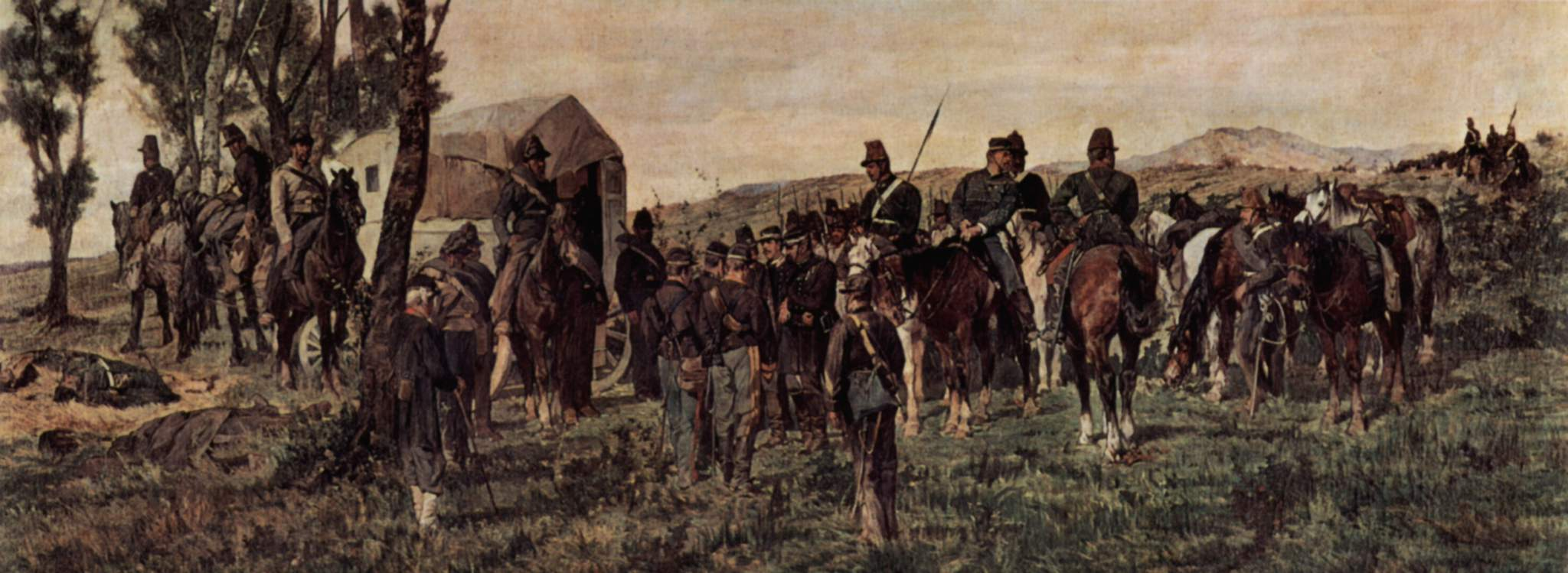
Giovanni Fattori, Prince Amadeo wounded at Custoza, 1870, oil on canvas

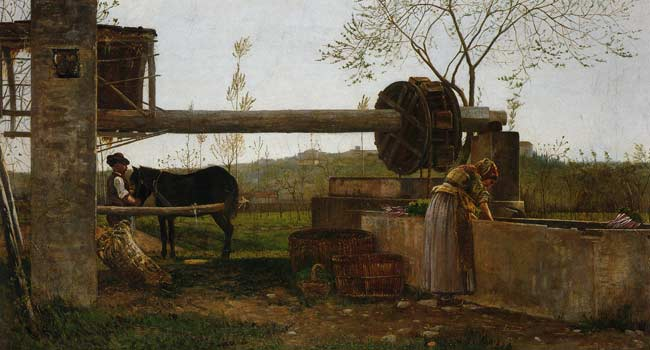
Silvestro Lega, il Bindolo, 1863

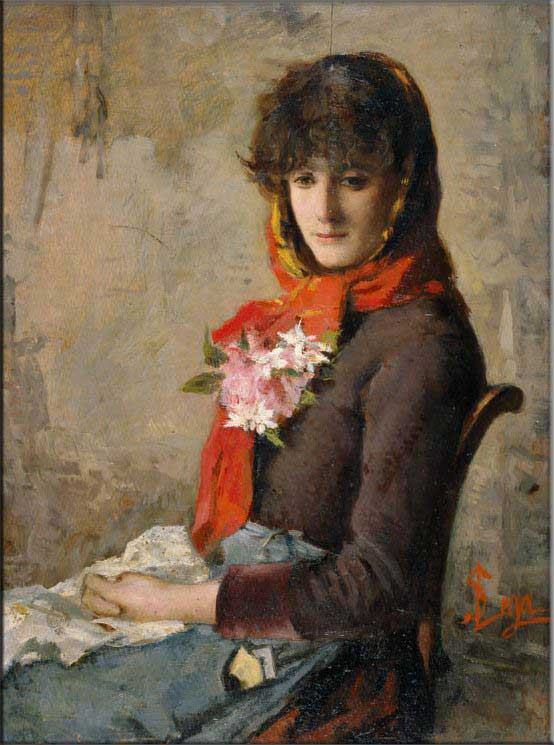
Silvestro Lega, Girl of Crespina

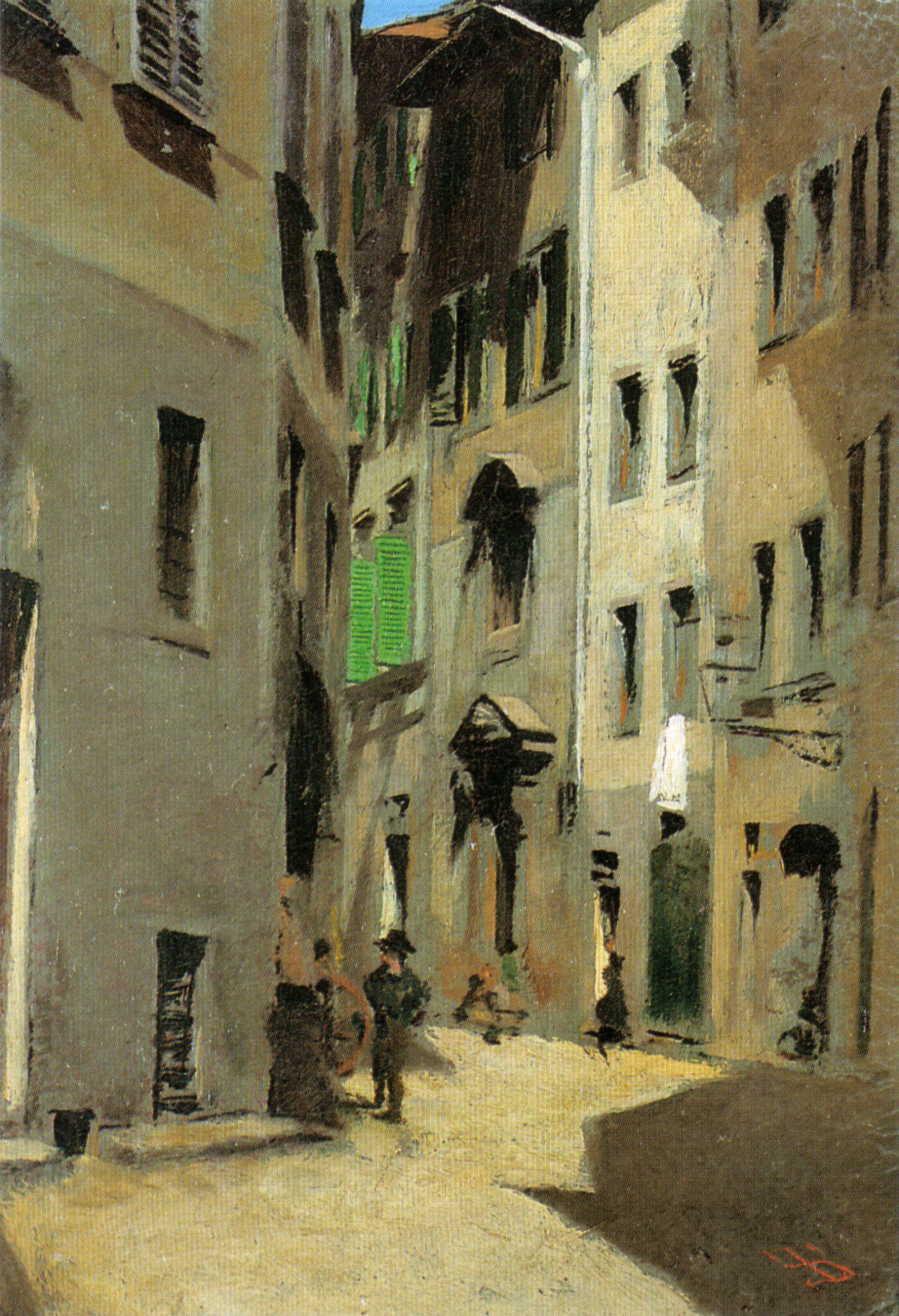
Telemaco Signorini, Via Torta, ca. 1870

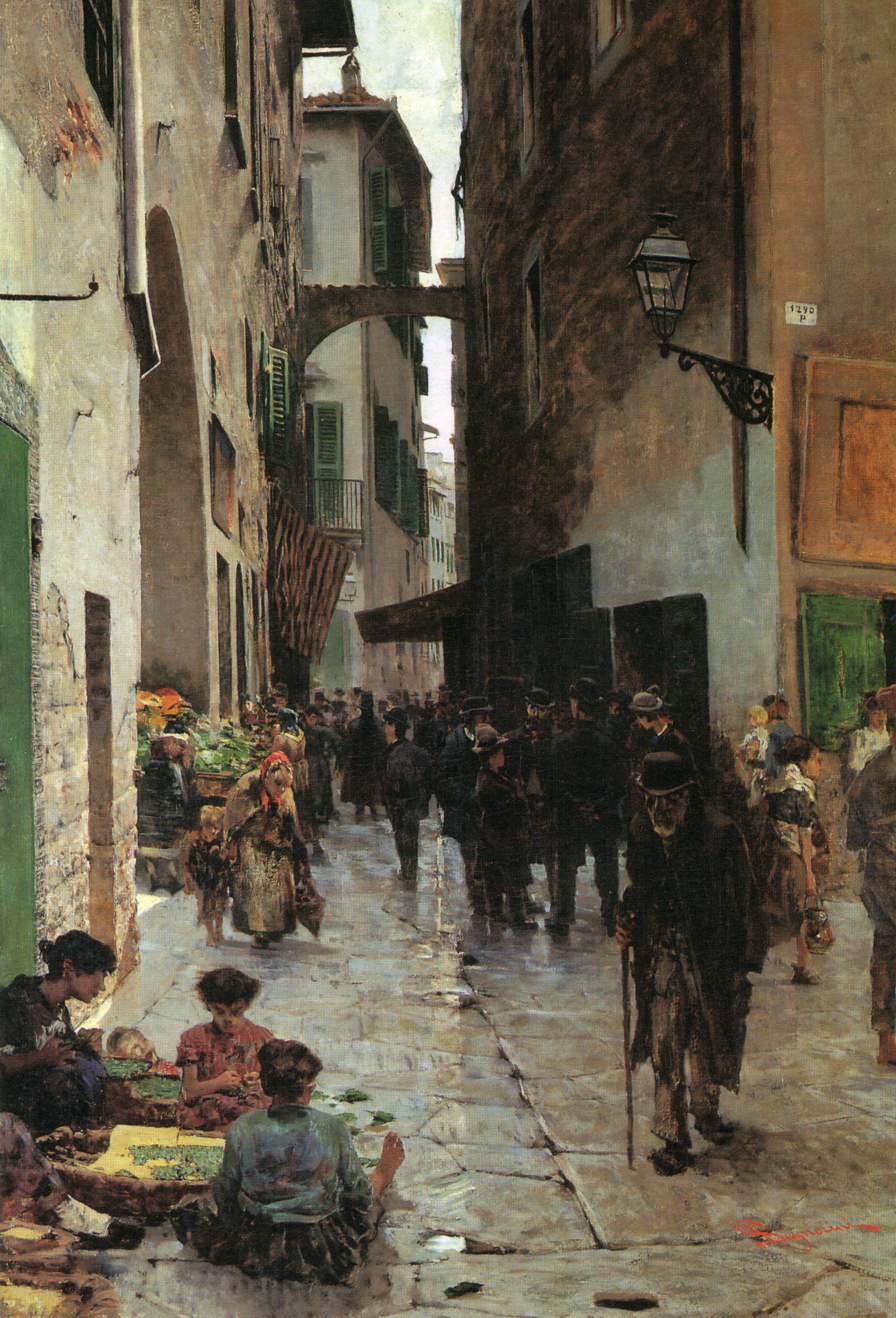
Telemaco Signorini, Ghetto of Florence, 1882

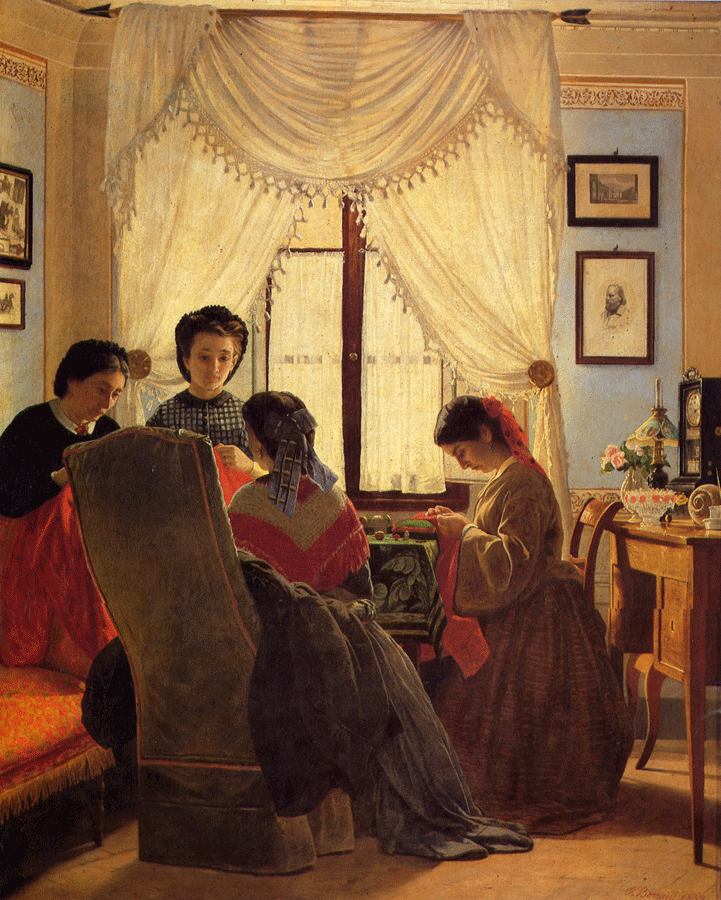
Odoardo Borrani, Cucitrici di camicie rosse, 1863

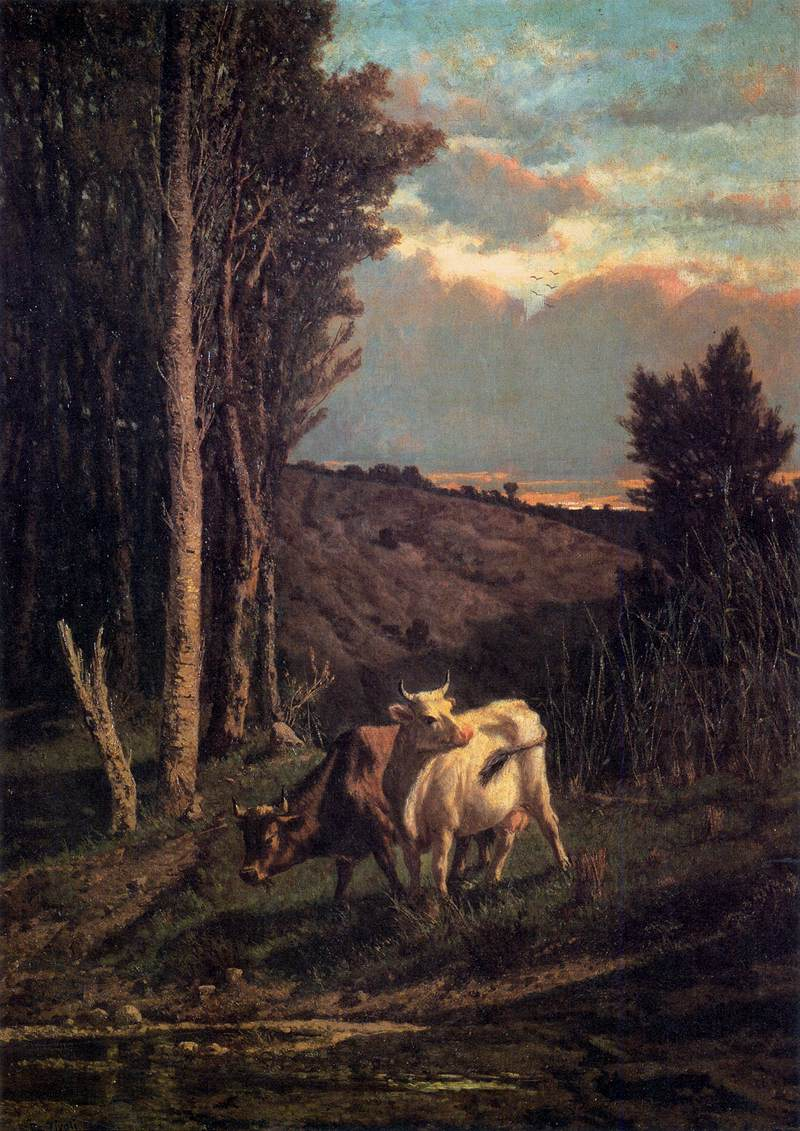
Serafino De Tivoli, Una pastura, 1859

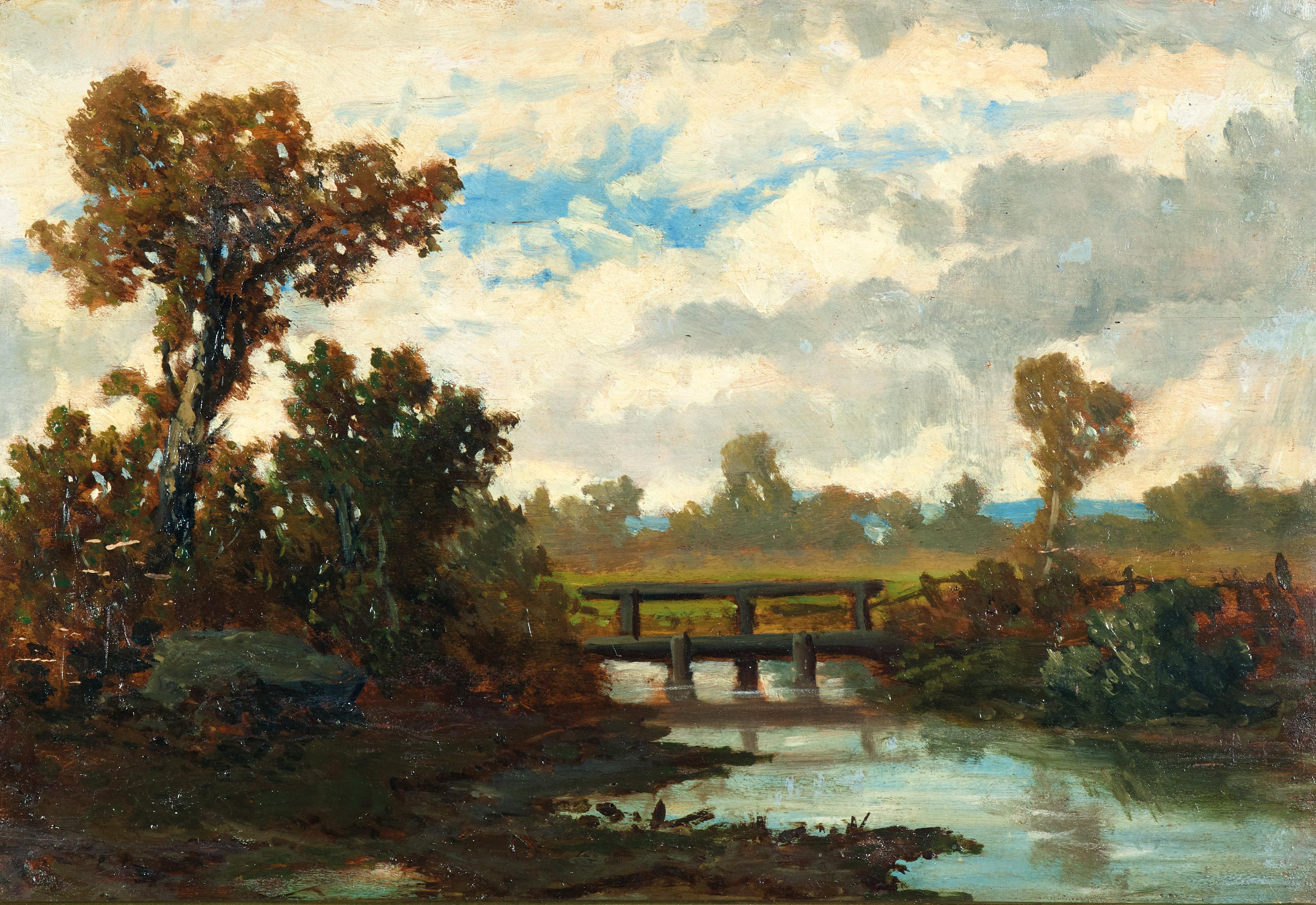
Serafino De Tivoli, Il ponte di legno, 1857-1859

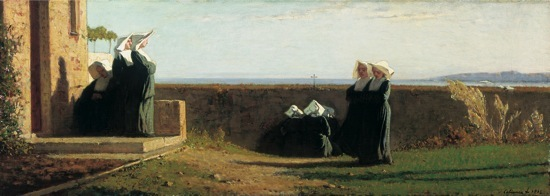
Vincenzo Cabianca, The Nuns, 1861

== See also ==
- Hudson River School
- Barbizon School
- Caffè Michelangiolo
