= Raffaello Sernesi =

Italian painter (1838–1866)

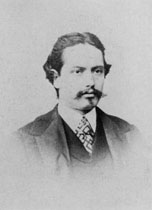
- Photograph of Raffaello Sernesi, c. 1860
- Born: December 25, 1838; Florence, Grand Duchy of Tuscany
- Died: August 9, 1866 (age 27); Bolzano
- Occupation: Italian painter

Raffaello Sernesi (December 25, 1838 – August 9, 1866) was an Italian painter and medallist associated with the Macchiaioli group.

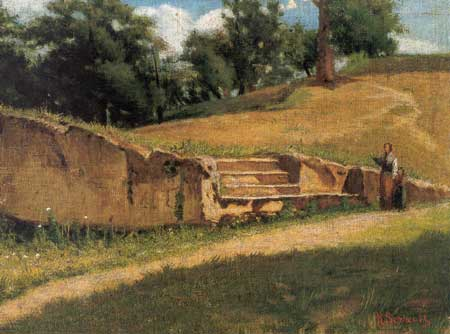
Abetelle pistoiesi, c. 1860, oil on wood, 23.9 x 37.4 cm

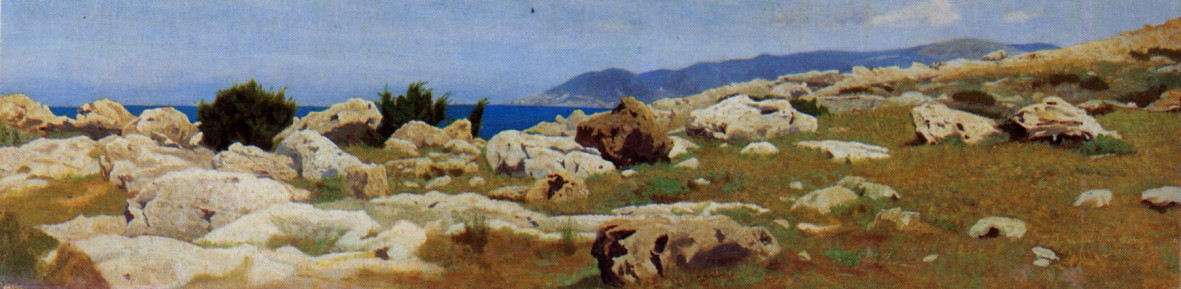
La punta del Romito veduta da Castiglioncello, 1864, oil on canvas

He was born in Florence in modest circumstances. After an apprenticeship to a local engraver, he enrolled at the Accademia of Florence in 1856, where he studied under Antonio Ciseri. As part of his training he made copies of the works of quattrocento artists such as Masaccio and Botticelli. In 1858 his father died, and Sernesi left the Academy in order to help support his family as an engraver and medallist. In 1859 he began frequenting the Caffè Michelangiolo and met the artists of the Macchiaioli, including Odoardo Borrani, who became a close friend.

Sernesi served as a volunteer in the Second Italian War of Independence in 1859. Upon his return to Florence later that year, he made his first plein air landscape paintings. Norma Broude says these works are characterized by "the azure and terracotta hues typical both of Tuscany's landscape and its fresco tradition" and says they reveal "a taste for rectilinear clarity in spatial and compositional organization". Sernesi exhibited his painting Pastura in montagna ("Mountain Pastures") at the Brera National Exhibition in 1861 and at the Florentine Promotrice in 1862. In 1862 he traveled to Naples and later to Ischia. He exhibited two paintings at the Milan exhibition in 1865.

In 1866 he joined Garibaldi's campaign in the Third Italian War of Independence. On July 16 he suffered a serious wound to the leg and was taken prisoner by the Austrians. He was taken to Bolzano for treatment, but his reluctance to have his leg amputated led to his death from gangrene on August 9, 1866.
