= Tommaso Gazzarrini =

Italian painter

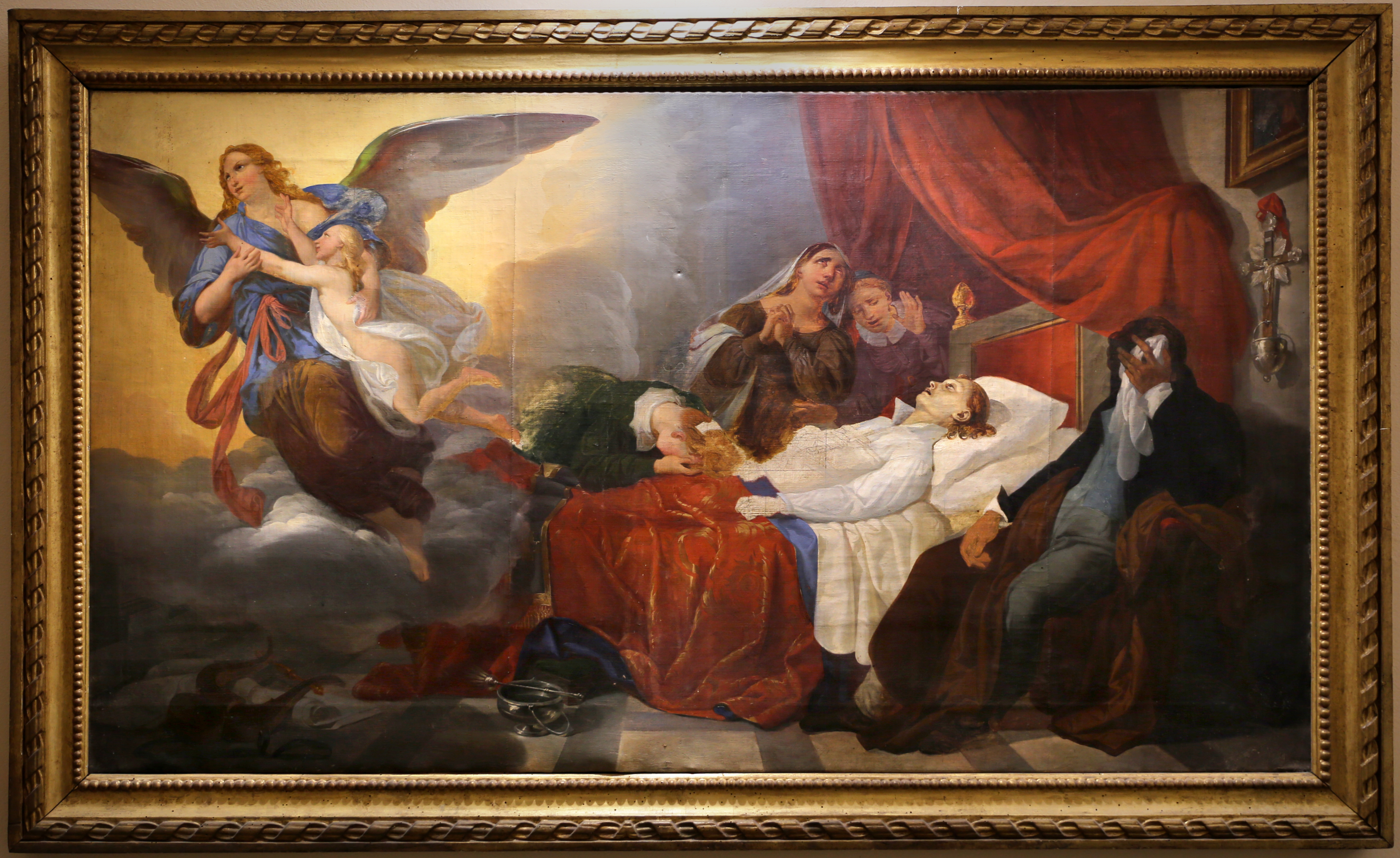
The Death of the Son of Tacchinardi, Montepulciano Museum

Tommaso Gazzarrini (February 15, 1790 – February 7, 1853) was an Italian painter born in Livorno, who painted religious and historic subjects in a Neoclassic style.

== Biography ==
He was a pupil of Pietro Benvenuti at the Academy of Fine Arts in Florence. In 1813–1814 at the academy, he won prizes for his designs of paintings of Hercules and Deianira and Entry of Leo X into Florence.

He then traveled to Rome after 1820 with a stipend from the Academy of Santa Agata. He painted that year a St Charles Borromeo goes in Milan at night to see those afflicted with plague for the Livornese church of San Benedetto. He relayed yearly painting essays to the Florentine Academy, including Diana's Hunt (copy of a Domenichino work); Sleeping Bacchus (1823); Tullia drives her chariot over the body of her father (Servius Tullius) (1820); and Jesus' Prayer in the Garden (1824).

After teaching at the Academy of San Luca in Rome, and at the Accademia Clementina in Bologna, in 1837, he returned to Florence. One of his pupils at the academy in Florence was Silvestro Lega.

Among his works are canvases depicting:

- Santa Giulia
- The Dying Christ
- Amadeus VI, Count of Savoy presents Paul, Latin Patriarch of Constantinople to Pope Urban V
- Holy family
- Archbishop Langton and Saxon, English, and Norman Barons in the Abbey of Edmonsbury demand King John to confirm Magna Carta (incomplete)
