= Caffè Michelangiolo =

Cafe in Florence, Italy

Coordinates: 43°46′31″N 11°15′23″E

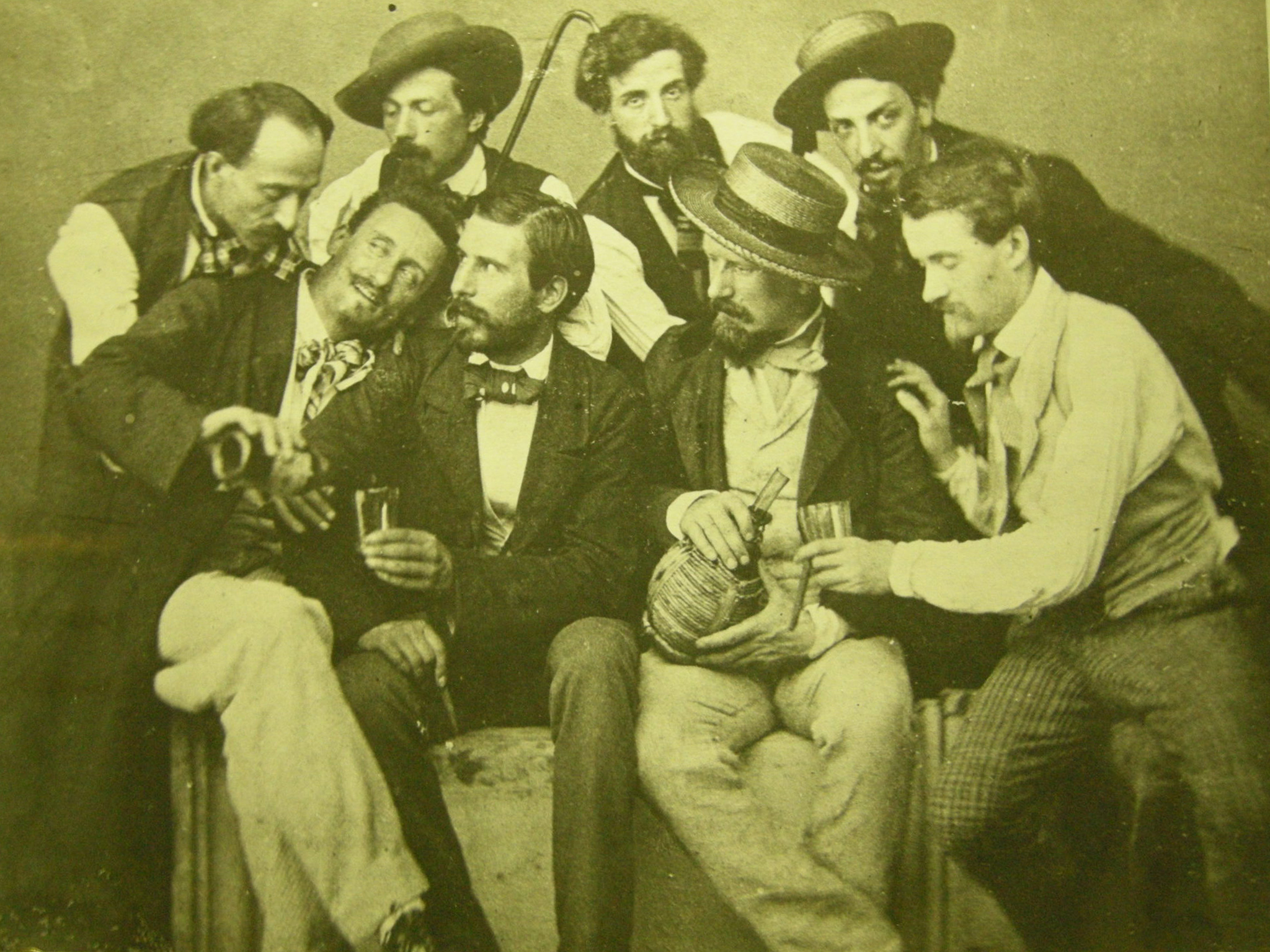
Macchiaioli at the Caffè Michelangelo c. 1856

Caffè Michelangiolo was a historic café in Florence, located in Via Larga (now renamed Via Cavour). During the nineteenth century Wars of Italian Independence, it became a major meeting place for Tuscan writers and artists, and for patriots and political exiles from other Italian states.

The Caffè, which existed from 1848 to 1866, was frequented by the artists of the Macchiaioli, especially after 1855. One of the artists, Telemaco Signorini, later published a memoir, Caricaturisti e caricaturati al Caffè Michelangiolo (1893), which has been called "the bible of the Macchiaioli movement". In it, Signorini described the nature of the discussions at the Caffè:

From 1848 to 1855, as a result of the times, political conspiracies and practical jokes prevailed. But from 1855 to 1860 ... the friends at the Caffè, remaining still, by tradition, the dear madcaps of Via Larga, joked less and devoted themselves more to their art.

== See also ==
- Caffè Bardi
