= Zanobi Canovai =

Italian painter and draughtsman (1824–1877)

Zanobi Canovai (13 October 1824 – October 1877) was an Italian painter and draughtsman.

== Biography ==
Zanobi Gaetano Canovai was born in Florence on 13 October 1824 from Giosia Canovai, public employee, and Rosa Odett. As a pupil, he studied at the Piarists schools and privately followed some courses of drawing before enrolling in the Accademia di Belle Arti di Firenze, where he attended from 1839 to 1848 the courses of Giuseppe Bezzuoli and Enrico Pollastrini. After the academic essays on an epic-religious theme, he followed a literary historical direction with paintings that he exhibited in some important locations and art galleries in Florence. Among his paintings we can remember: "The slavery of the Jews on the banks of the rivers of Babylon" (1852), "Blind Galileo Galilei dictated to Viviani the theorem on the fall of the grave" (1854), "Dante Alighieri and Virgil meet Casella (Divine Comedy)" (first prize in Gallery of Modern Art, Florence in 1855). In 1848, he participated as a volunteer in the Revolutions of 1848 and was arrested and locked up in the prison of Terezín. In 1861, he was appointed assistant of Enrico Pollastrini, who was the director of the Accademia di Belle Arti of Florence and teacher of painting and drawing, a position he held until 1874. Among his students, we can remember Egisto Ferroni, Francesco Gioli, Giuseppe Bellucci and Tito Lessi. In this period, he had his atelier in Florence, via Ricasoli 54. He was also the author of religious paintings for public customers such as "The baptism of Jesus", exhibited in 1861 in Florence, for the parish church of San Giovanni a Sugana and "Madonna and Child Enthroned with Saints Lorenzo and Zanobi", in the romantic climate of Renaissance Revival historicism, for the third chapel of San Lorenzo, Florence under the patronage of the house of Altoviti in 1877. In his career, he won some important prizes such as the first prize with the oil sketch "Jupiter dressed as a pilgrim receives hospitality in Philemon's house" in 1847, the first prize for the drawing "The count Ugolino della Gherardesca, arrested by order of archbishop Ruggeri" in 1849. He died in Florence in October 1877.

== Artwork ==
Zanobi Canovai painted with sentimental and emotional tone following the classical references of the masters of the sixteenth and seventeenth centuries. He was an extremely cultured painter with an impeccable technique that was never icy and coldly blocked by sterile idealizations but characterized by a subtle romantic vein. A romanticism that enlivens works with mythological, epic and historical themes.

== Works ==
- "Blind Galileo Galilei dictated to Viviani the theorem on the fall of the grave", dated 1854, oil on canvas.
- "Dante and Virgil meet Casella" dated 1855, oil on canvas.
- "The slavery of the Jews on the banks of the rivers of Babylon" dated 1852, oli on canvas.
- "The baptism of Jesus", dated 1861, oil on canvas, Pieve di San Giovanni in Sugana.
- "Madonna and Child Enthroned with Saints Lorenzo and Zanobi", dated 1877, oil on canvas, San Lorenzo church in Florence.
- "The count Ugolino arrested by order of archbishop Ruggeri" dated 1849, drawing.
- "Jupiter dressed as a pilgrim receives hospitality in Philemon's house" dated 1847, oli on canvas.
- "Sappho", dated 1869, drawing and watercolor on card.
- Notebook of sixty-nine sheets of blue paper, with drawings of various subjects and techniques. Gabinetto dei disegni e delle stampe inside Uffizi.
