= Santa Maria del Soccorso, Livorno =

Church in Livorno, Italy

Coordinates: 43.5456°N 10.3165°E

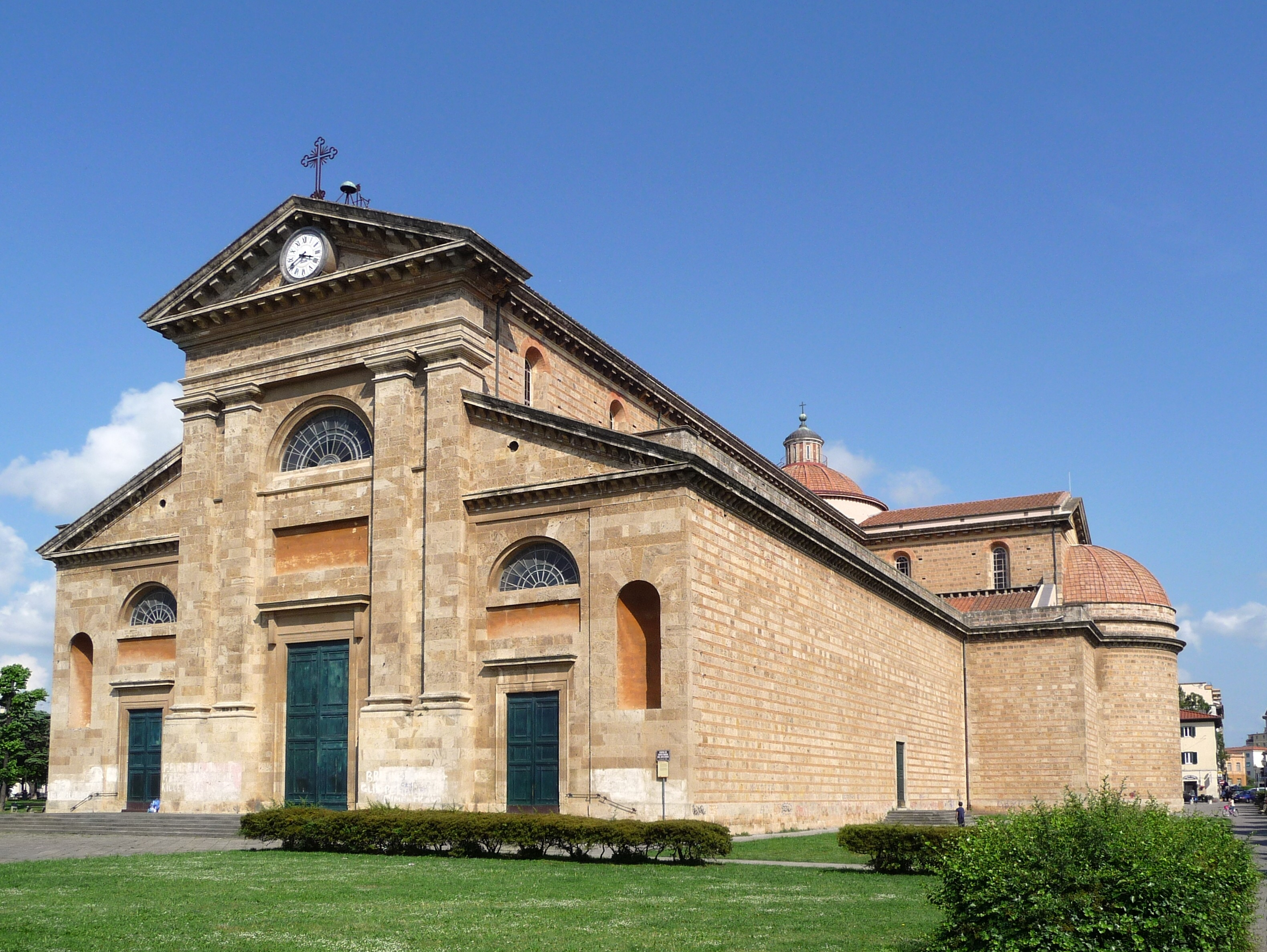
Santa Maria del Soccorso Church

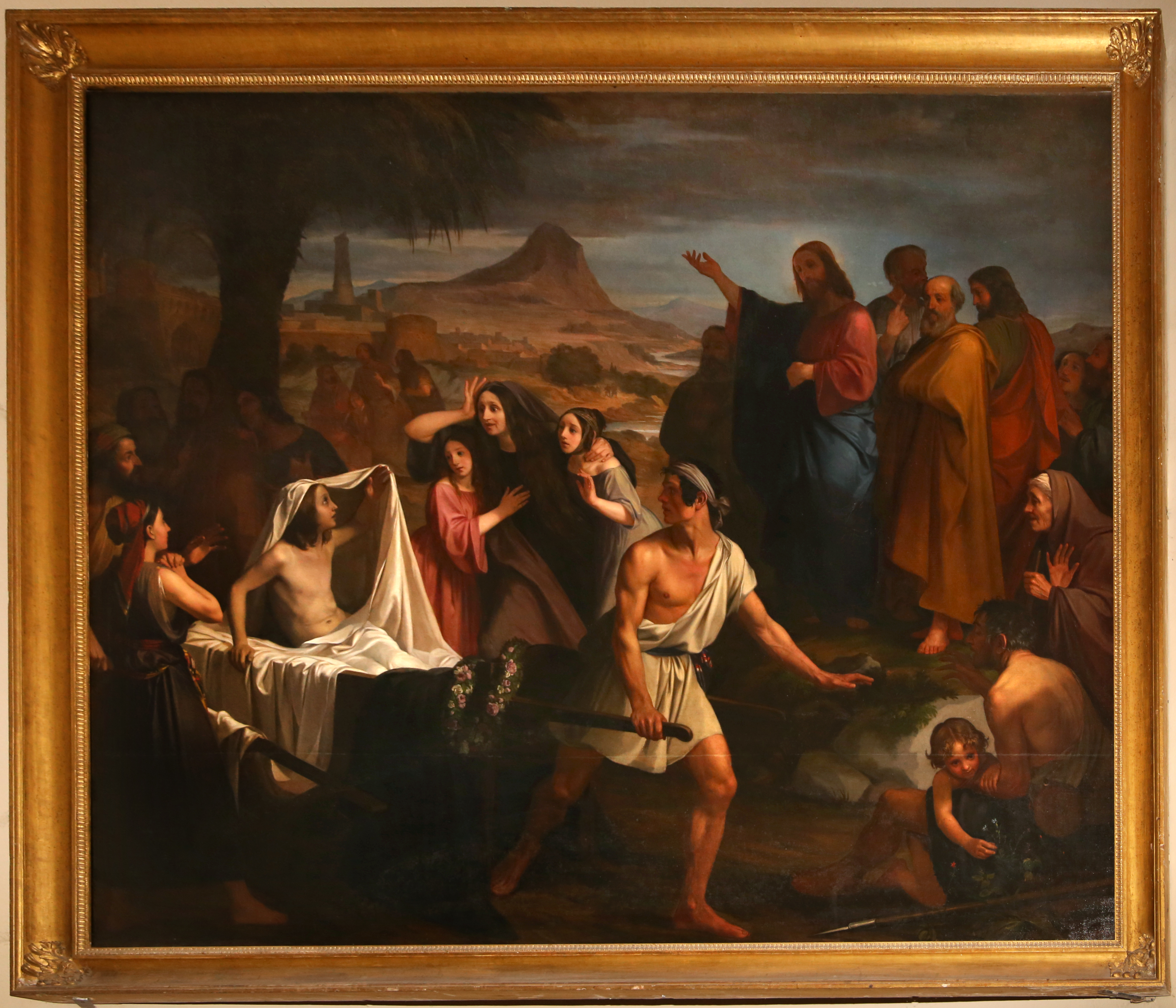
Enrico Pollastrini, The Miracle of the Resurrection of the Son of the Widow of Nain, 1839

Santa Maria del Soccorso (Our Lady of the Rescue) is a Neoclassical style, Roman Catholic, Marian votive church in central Livorno. The tall brick church facade is located scenically at the end of Via Magenta, and has a park surrounding it. In front is a Monument to Fallen Soldiers (Caduti) in the first World War.

== History ==
The church was built and dedicated to the Virgin Mary, in gratitude for the ebbing of a plague of cholera in 1835. The design was by Gaetano Gherardi and construction began in 1836. The sober stone facade has flanking pilasters, and sports a clock in the tympanum (architecture) originating from the Cathedral. The interior has a Latin cross layout with seven arches flanking the nave, and bears a resemblance to the interior of the church of Santo Spirito in Florence. The earthquake of 1846 caused some damage. The church was consecrated as a parish church in 1855-1856. The church served as the main church of Livorno while the bomb-damaged duomo was rebuilt after World War II.

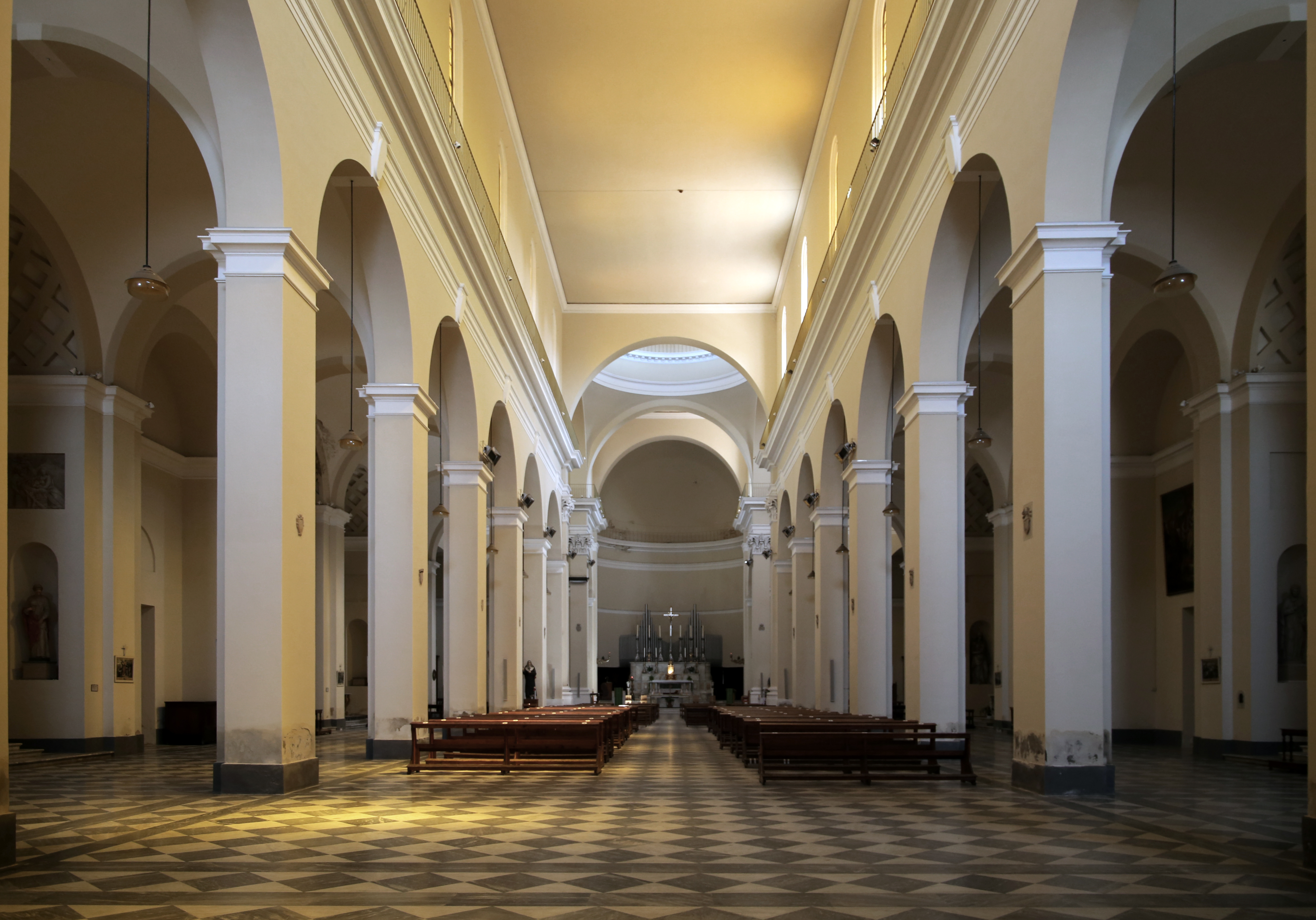
Interior

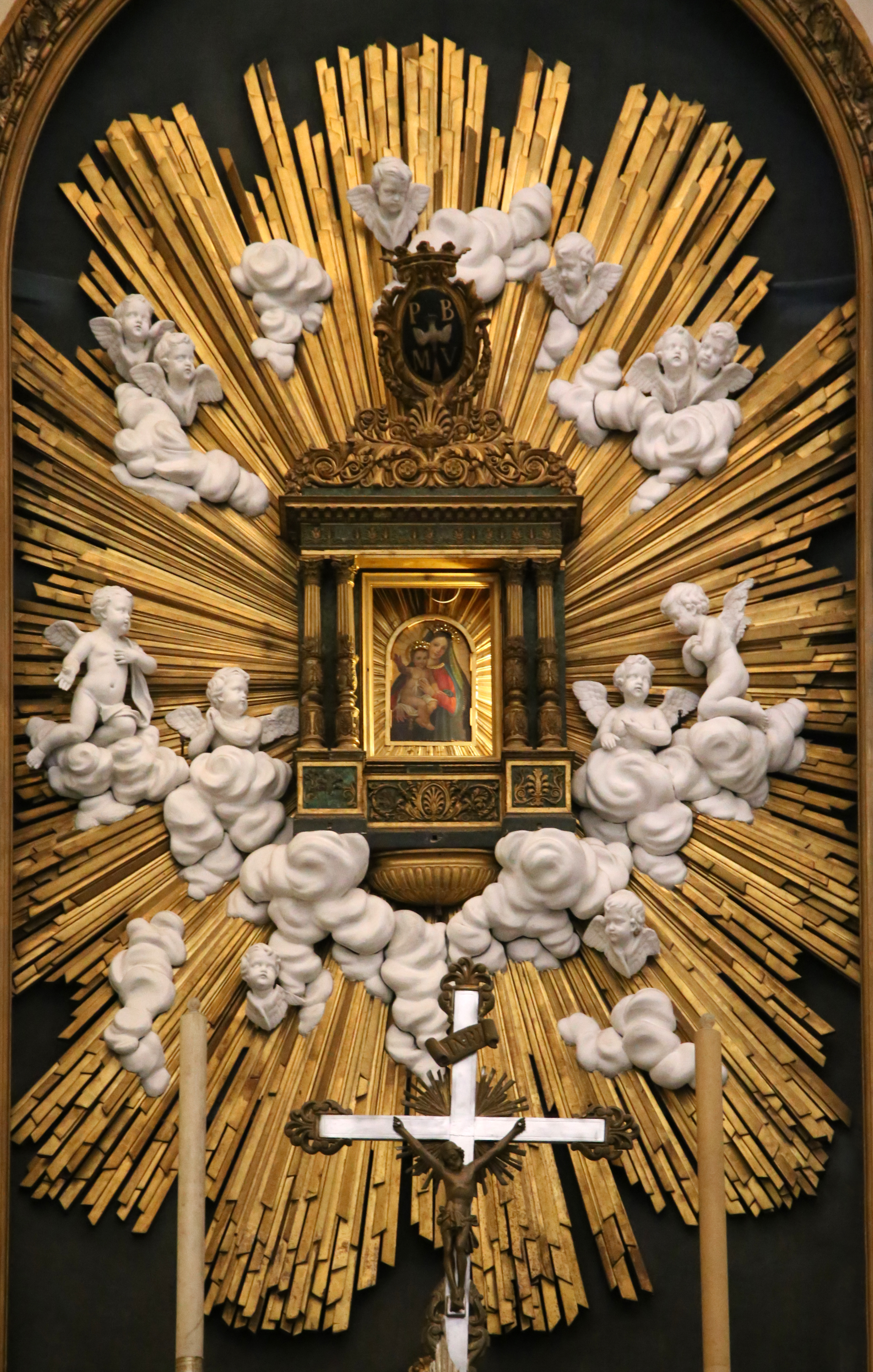
Madonna del Soccorso

The second altar on the right has a painting by Enrico Pollastrini, depicting the protomartyr St Lawrence in a catacomb dispensing Charity with the martyr St Espedito. Count Francesco De Larderei commissioned the next altarpiece depicting St Francis of Assisi resurrecting a child in the hands of her mother, painted by Ferdinando Falchi. The next altarpiece depicts St Peter Apostle by Giuseppe Baldini, commissioned by Alessandro Malenchini.

Another chapel to the right of the nave houses a Jesus resurrects the son of the widow of Naim, an early work of Pollastrini. On the altar of the crossing is a tabernacle by Ferdinando Magagnini, with an image of the Madonna del Soccorso. In the sacristy is a canvas by Giovanni Bartolena, depicting the foundation of the church. The chapel also housed a small image of the Addolorata, and the Resurrection, painted on wood, from a follower of Giotto, donated by Silvestro Silvestri. The church had an chiaroscuro altarpiece depicting a The Rescuing Madonna sends an angelic ambassador of health to the poor afflicted with cholera by Niccola Ulacacci.

On the right of the altar is a canvas by Giovanni Costa, depicting the Translation of the body of St Catherine of Alexandria by Angels to Mount Sinai and by a follower of Cigoli is a St Francis of Assisi. The altar of St Louis Gonzaga, has canvas by Angiolo Visconti, a pupil of Mussini. The guild of Fishmongers of Livorno in 1867 erected the altar of St Raphael Archangel with a canvas by Giovanni Bartolena. Cavaliere Niccola Niccolai Gamba funded the next chapel's altar, and commissioned a Madonna of the Consolation also by Bartolena. The last altar, commissioned by the Gazzarrini family holds a depiction of St Vincent of Paul by Guardassoni.
