= Bartolena =

Bartolena is an Italian surname. Notable people with the surname include:

- Cesare Bartolena (1830–1903), Italian painter
- Giovanni Bartolena (1886–1942), Italian painter, grandson of Cesare
