= Eugenio Cecconi =

Italian painter (1842–1903)

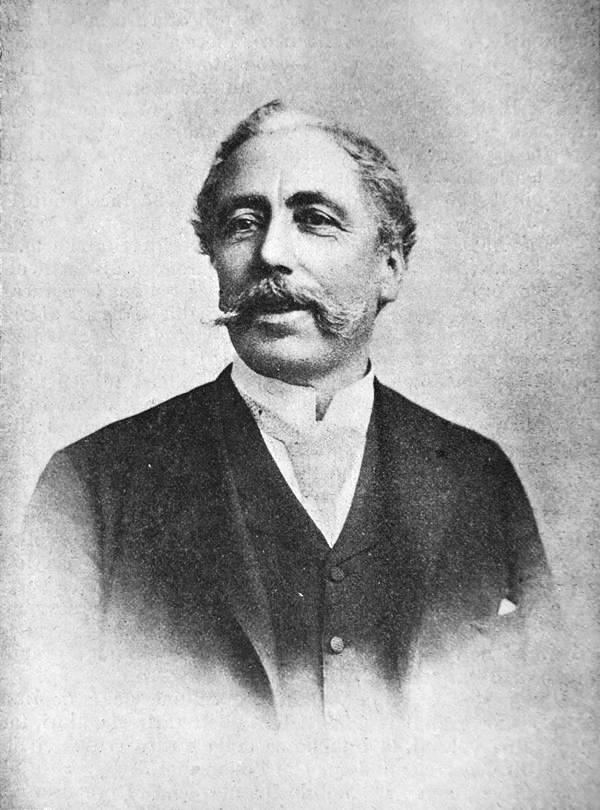
- Eugenio Cecconi (date unknown)
- Born: September 8, 1842; Livorno, Grand Duchy of Tuscany
- Died: December 19, 1903 (aged 61); Florence, Kingdom of Italy
- Education: University of Pisa; Art Academy, Florence

Eugenio Cecconi (September 8, 1842 – December 19, 1903) was an Italian painter. He is most noted for his paintings of hunting scenes and the Italian countryside, however his work also includes many representations of Oriental themes.

== Early life ==
He was born in Livorno into a wealthy family. His father owned substantial lands around Livorno, and the rents were used not only to support his large family, but also to assist those who worked towards a unified Italy. For his support of the rebels, Cecconi's father was forced into exile, taking refuge in the countryside. The young Cecconi acquired his love of nature and animals during this period and developed a passion for hunting.

== Education and career ==
He first studied jurisprudence at the University of Pisa, then entered a course of study under the sculptor Fazzi from Lucca, a pupil of Carlo Markò the elder. He moved to Florence to practice law with Leopoldo Cempini, but began to attend courses of painting at the Academy under Enrico Pollastrini. Following his father's death in 1864 he abandoned law, and concentrated on painting. His early work concentrated on portraits of customers, painted inside his studio. However, when the weather was good, he would take to the hills and paint scenes from the countryside.

In 1866, he volunteered with other Tuscan artists to fight in the wars of Italian Independence. After that campaign, he opened a studio in Livorno adjacent to Adolfo Belimbau. By the summer of that year, Diego Martelli hosted him in Castiglioncello, where he worked alongside Boldini, Bechi, and Abbati. In 1869, he considered himself sufficient as a painter, and began to exhibit some of his works at the Promotrice di Turin. Encouraged by friends and other painters, he exhibited again in 1872 at the second National Exhibition of Milan. The 1872 exhibition was a turning point in his career, as his work gained considerable public and critical attention.

In 1873, he moved to Ceppato, near Lari, painting hunting scenes. He became friends with Francesco Gioli and Corcos. In 1875, he travelled to Tunisia with Belimbau. Upon returning to Tuscany, he settled in Torre del Lago, the hamlet which was now a locus for artistic pilgrimages due to the presence of the Villa of Puccini. Following his sojourn in Tunisia, he became interested in Oriental scenes. His experience also changed his perceptions of colour and light.

In 1880 he exhibited Cenciaiole Livornesi and exhibited at the International Exposition of Modern Paintings at the società Donatello. Between 1881 and 1888, he exhibited at Florence, Rome, Milan, Bologna, and Turin.

He died in Florence in 1903.

== Work ==
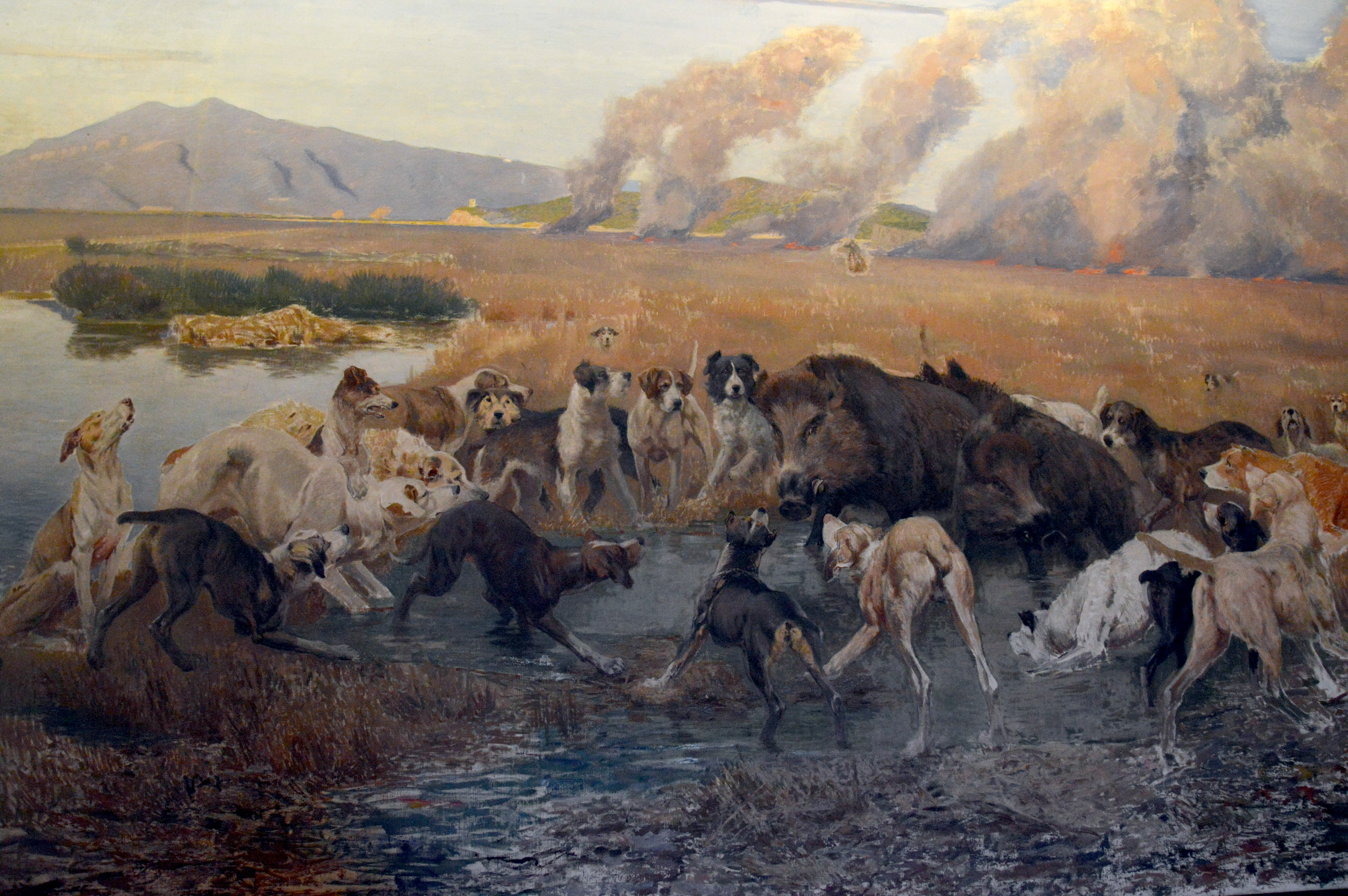
La Caccia al Cinghiale nel Padule di Burano (detail)

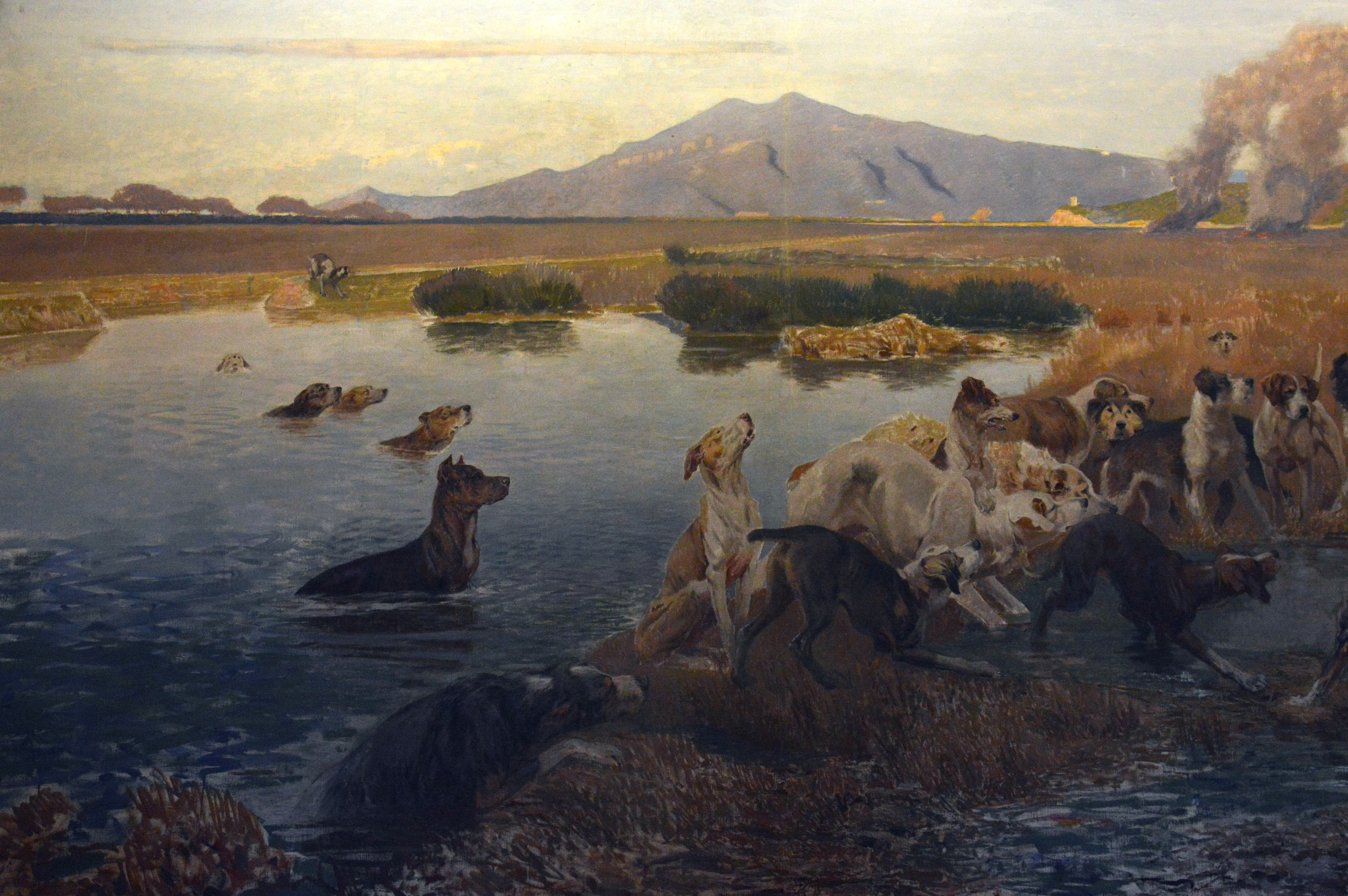
La Caccia al Cinghiale nel Padule di Burano (detail)

Cecconi worked in oils, watercolor, tempera, engraving and fresco. His early work feature portraits and scenes of the Italian countryside. His later works include Oriental themes. He is most noted for his hunting scenes featuring hunting dogs.

=== Select list of paintings ===
- Hunted Rally
- Maremmano Braccaiolo
- Hunters' Park
- Hunters on the Seashore
- Hunting in the Fucecchio Padule
- Hunting Appointment
- Deer Death
- Hound Dogs
- Wild Boar
- Cenciaiole Livornesi 1880
- Paesaggio Invernale, 1885
- Volto di Donna Araba,
