= Giuseppe Moricci =

Italian painter

- Born: 11 March 1806; Florence
- Died: 28 January 1879 (aged 72); Florence
- Occupation: Painter

Giuseppe Moricci (11 March 1806 - 28 January 1879) was an Italian painter, mainly of genre, vedute, and contemporary events.

== Biography ==
He was born in Florence. He became professor of the Academy of Fine Arts of Florence. Among his works is the Processione dell'angiolino alla SS. Annunziata di Firenze. He frequented the Caffè Michelangiolo, alonge with Enrico Pollastrini. Many of his vedute are drawings or engravings that show sections of Florence prior to Risanamiento. His Letter from the Volunteer (soldier) is displayed in the Senate building in Rome.
