= Adolfo Belimbau =

Italian painter (1845–1938)

Adolfo Belimbau (1845–1938) was an Italian painter.

== Biography ==
He was born in Cairo, Egypt to an Italian Sephardic Jewish family from Tuscany. He lived most of his life in Florence or Livorno. He trained under a painter named Provenzal in Livorno. At the age of 17, he went into commerce, and returned to art only after 11 years. In 1886, he helped organize in the Exhibition of Fine Arts in Livorno, a town which was becoming a summer beach destination.

Among his works is the painting L'uscita dal lavoro (Exit from work), which depicts a long line of women exiting a factory, devolving into animated chatter after a long day of work. At the 1887 Mostra of Venice, he displayed Aiselia and Prima del minuetto. This latter airy painting was reproduced by Illustrazione di Milan and later in an illustrated German journal. His later paintings became more rich and depicted leisurely activities.

Luigi Chirtani mockingly claimed that the late Belimbau catered to his wealthy buyers, and gone was the haggard and proletarian bent of the uscita painting:

Once this artist preferred themes of the hard life of the people, workers, artisans, poor people of all sorts, and now, with more agreement with his inclinations and noble gentleman, he prefers those most likely to appear in those rooms where they hang on the walls and distribute the notebooks on the shelves, on fireplaces, objects d 'art for luxury and home decoration.

Belimbau was influenced by the Macchiaioli painters, and was a colleague and friend of the painters Vittorio Matteo Corcos, Ulvi Liegi, and Alberto Pisa. At a Promotrice di Firenze he displayed A Fountain in Livorno, in which returned to painting street scenes. He also painted the sentimental Une page d'Amour. He continued patronage of art in his later years, for example, establishing the Fondazione Livornese di studi ebraici "Adolfo Belimbau".
