= Giuseppe Marrubini =

Italian painter

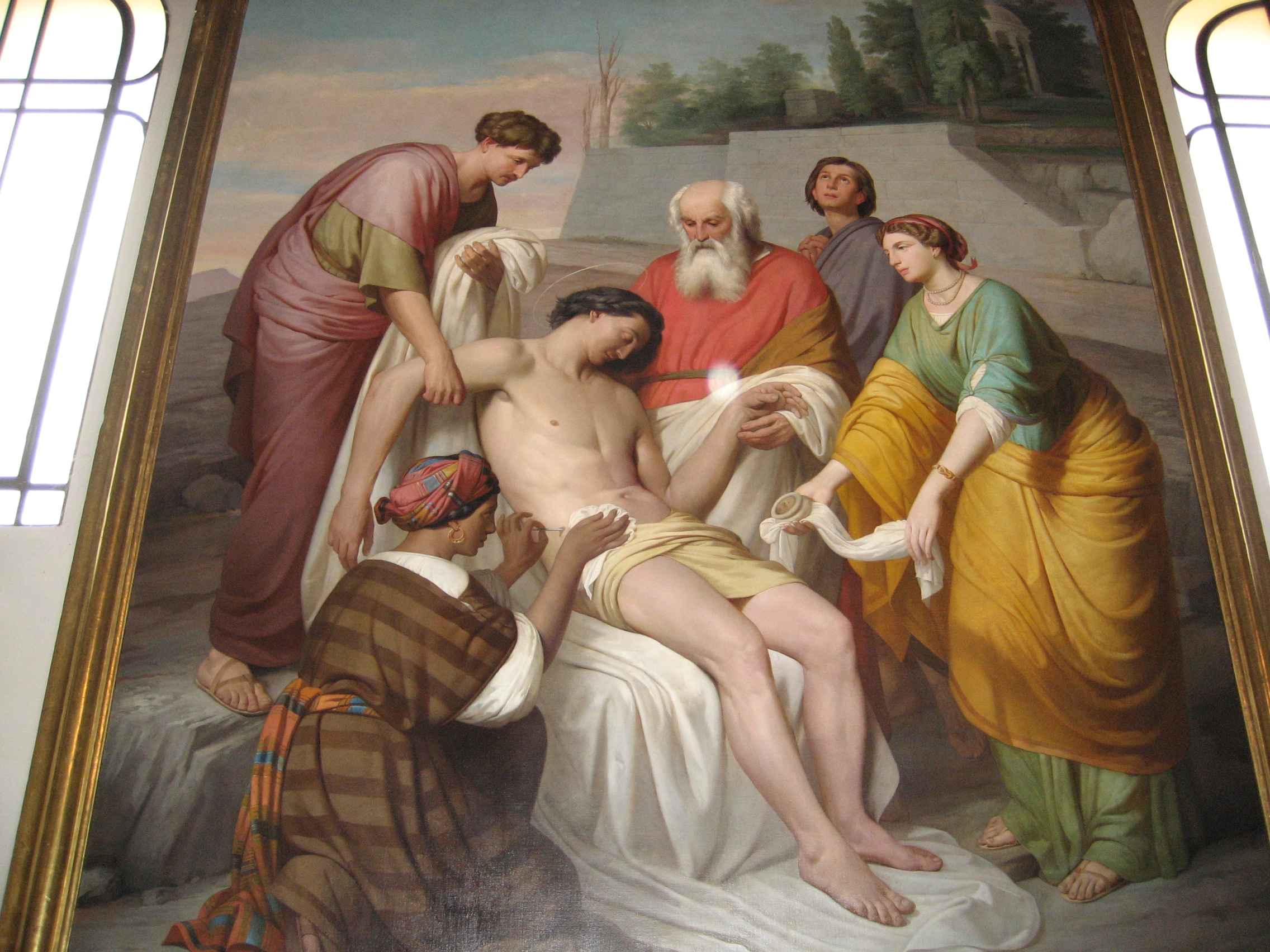
"The Deposition of Saint Sebastian", Chiesa della Misericordia, in Montevarchi

Giuseppe Marrubini or Marubini (1815–1880) was an Italian painter and engraver of the 19th century, active in painting historic and sacred subjects.

== Biography ==
He was born in Montevarchi in Tuscany, but studied at the Academy of Fine Arts of Florence under Giuseppe Bezzuoli. In 1842, he exhibited Manfred bids his wife farewell before leaving to fight Charles of Anjou. In 1844 he exhibited an episode from the poem The Loves of the Angels by Thomas Moore. In 1848 he exhibited Origins of the Guelfs and Ghibellines in Florence at the Promotrice Fiorentina.

After 1850, he taught figure design at the Academy, under Enrico Pollastrini. He also became active as an engraver. In 1876 he painted a portrait in his deathbed of his long-time colleague Pollastrini. He painted the main altarpiece Deposition of St Sebastian (1868) for the Chiesa della Misericordia, in Montevarchi. Niccolò Cannicci was one of his pupils.
