= Archinti =

Archinti is an Italian surname. Notable people with the surname include:

- Aurelio Archinti (1588–1622), Italian Roman Catholic bishop
- Luigi Archinti (1825–1902), Italian art historian, art critic, and painter
