= Niccolò Cannicci =

Italian painter (1846–1906)

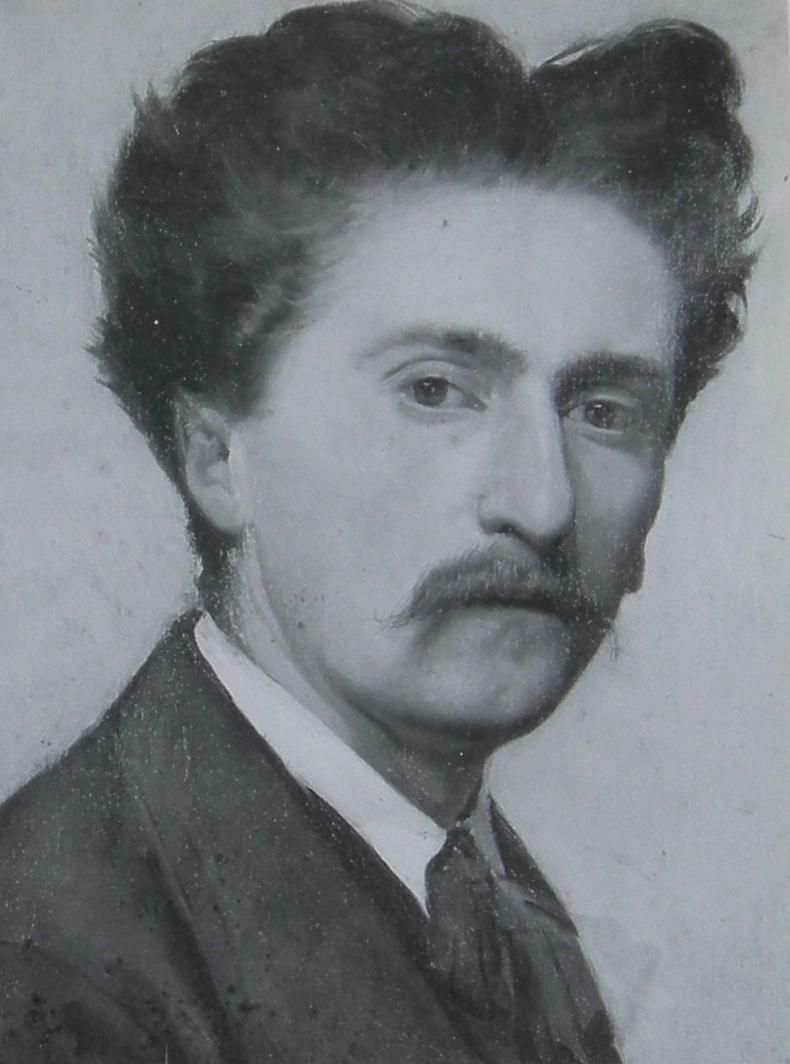
- Self-portrait (c. 1870)
- Born: 29 October 1846; Florence, Grand Duchy of Tuscany
- Died: 19 January 1906 (aged 59); Florence, Kingdom of Italy

Niccolò Cannicci (1846–1906) was an Italian painter; best known for his urban and rural views, often depicting the intersection of the urban and industrial landscape with the rural and pastoral.

== Biography ==
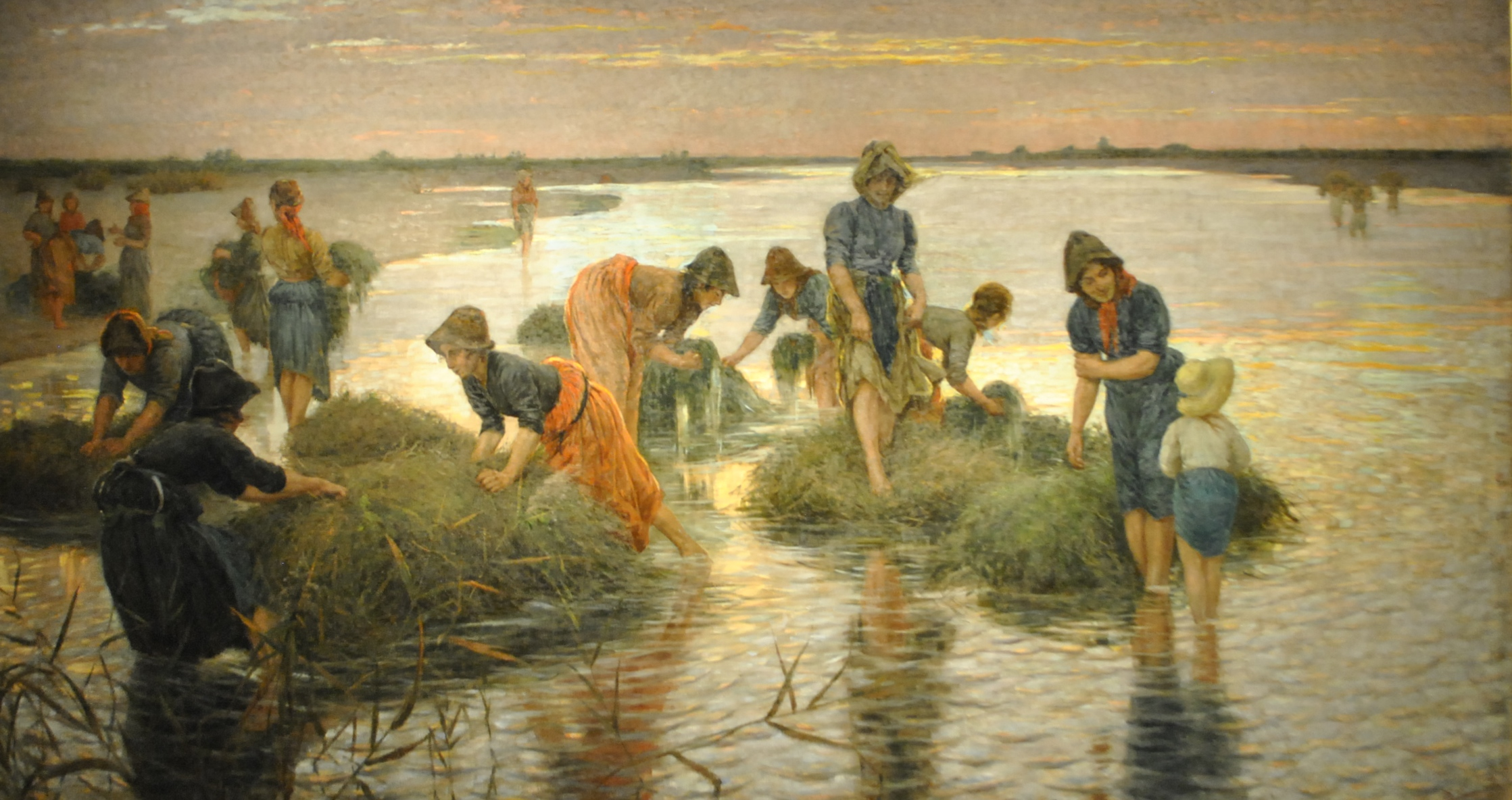
The Grasses by the River

He was born to the painter, Gaetano Cannicci (1811-1878), who was originally from San Gimignano. His first lessons came from his father. From 1862 to 1865, he attended the Accademia di Belle Arti di Firenze, where he studied with Giuseppe Marrubini and Enrico Pollastrini, and participated in the nude drawing classes of Antonio Ciseri.

After graduating, he frequented the Caffè Michelangiolo, meeting with Giovanni Fattori and other members of the Macchiaioli. During this time, he focused on landscapes of Maremma and the area around San Gimignano, where he lived with an uncle.

In 1872, he had his first showing at the Accademia. Three years later, he went to Paris, where he stayed with Fattori, Egisto Ferroni and Francesco Gioli. His work became heavily influenced by them, but he was also exposed to Impressionism. From 1876, he attended meetings of the "Decentralist Committee", formed by the art critic Diego Martelli, and began promoting greater autonomy for the local academies in Italy.

Over the next decade, he participated in several major exhibitions, including the Exposition Universelle (1878), and one at the Royal Academy of Arts in London (1883). He was a regular exhibitor at the Esposizione Internazionale di Venezia from 1887.

For much of his adult life, his physical and mental health were in a fragile state. Following the death of his mother in 1893, he suffered a nervous breakdown and attempted l suicide several times. This resulted in his being committed to the San Niccolò di Siena psychiatric hospital. He did, however, make use of this experience; creating an album of portraits of the mentally ill.

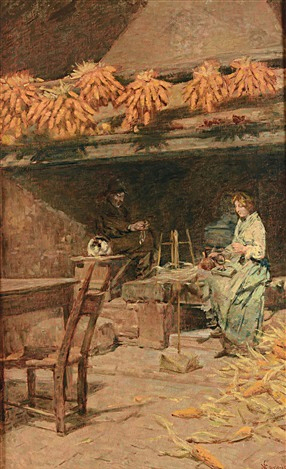
Corn Harvesters

Later, he settled in the isolated village of Montemiccioli and began participating in local exhibitions. He died in Florence, aged fifty-nine.
