= Ippazio =

Ippazio is a masculine Italian given name. Notable people with the name include:

- Ippazio Antonio Bortone (1847–1938), Italian sculptor
- Ippazio Stefano (born 1945), Italian politician and physician
