= Pietro Saltini =

Italian painter

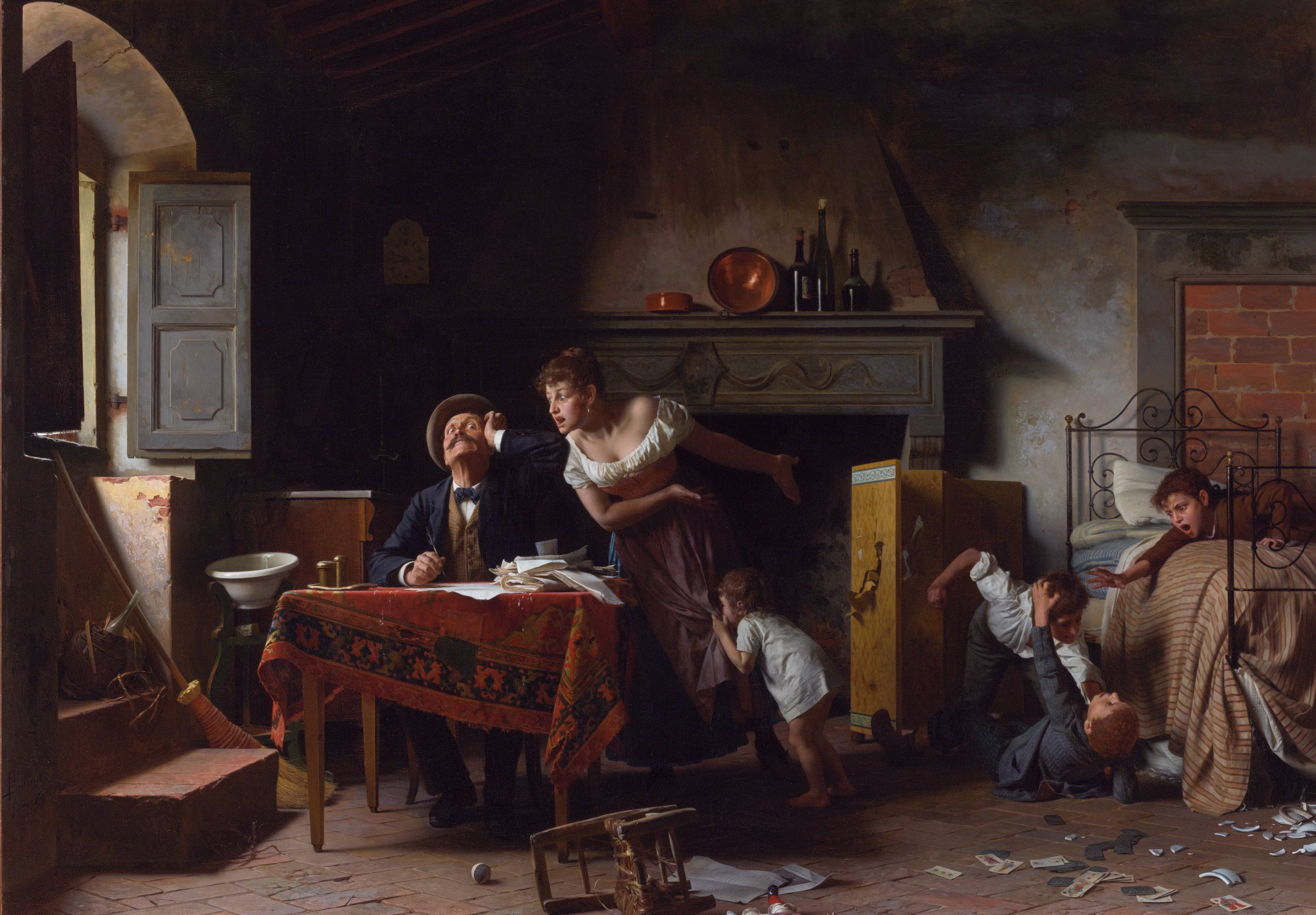
The Joys of Home

Pietro Saltini (February 21, 1839 – 1908) was an Italian painter.

== Biography ==
He was born and died in Florence. He first studied the classics, then transferred to the Academy of the Fine Arts, where he studied scenography under professor Agostino Lessi, and perspective and decoration under the professor Raffaello Martini, and figure under professor Enrico Pollastrini. Among his works are Simon Memmi paints the portrait of Beatrice for Dante; Laura, a commission from King Vittorio Emanuele II; La Novella della nonna, bought by the Museo Civico Revoltella of Trieste; Between two friends, once at the Royal Pinacoteca of Capodimonte; The Good Judge; Gioie di famiglia; I beoni; Amor non mette ruggine; Una partita a carte; Il giornale umoristico; Soap bubble; A lesson; After dinner; Se la tocchi!; Ancora no!; Tenerezze; and In villa. Saltini reproduced in lithography: Novella della Nonna, awarded with a bronze medal at the 1877 Exhibibition of Florence. he became Professor Correspondent of the Collegio Accademico of Florence.
