= Palazzo Corvaja =

Medieval palace in Taormina, Sicily

Coordinates: 37°51′13.88″N 15°17′18.30″E

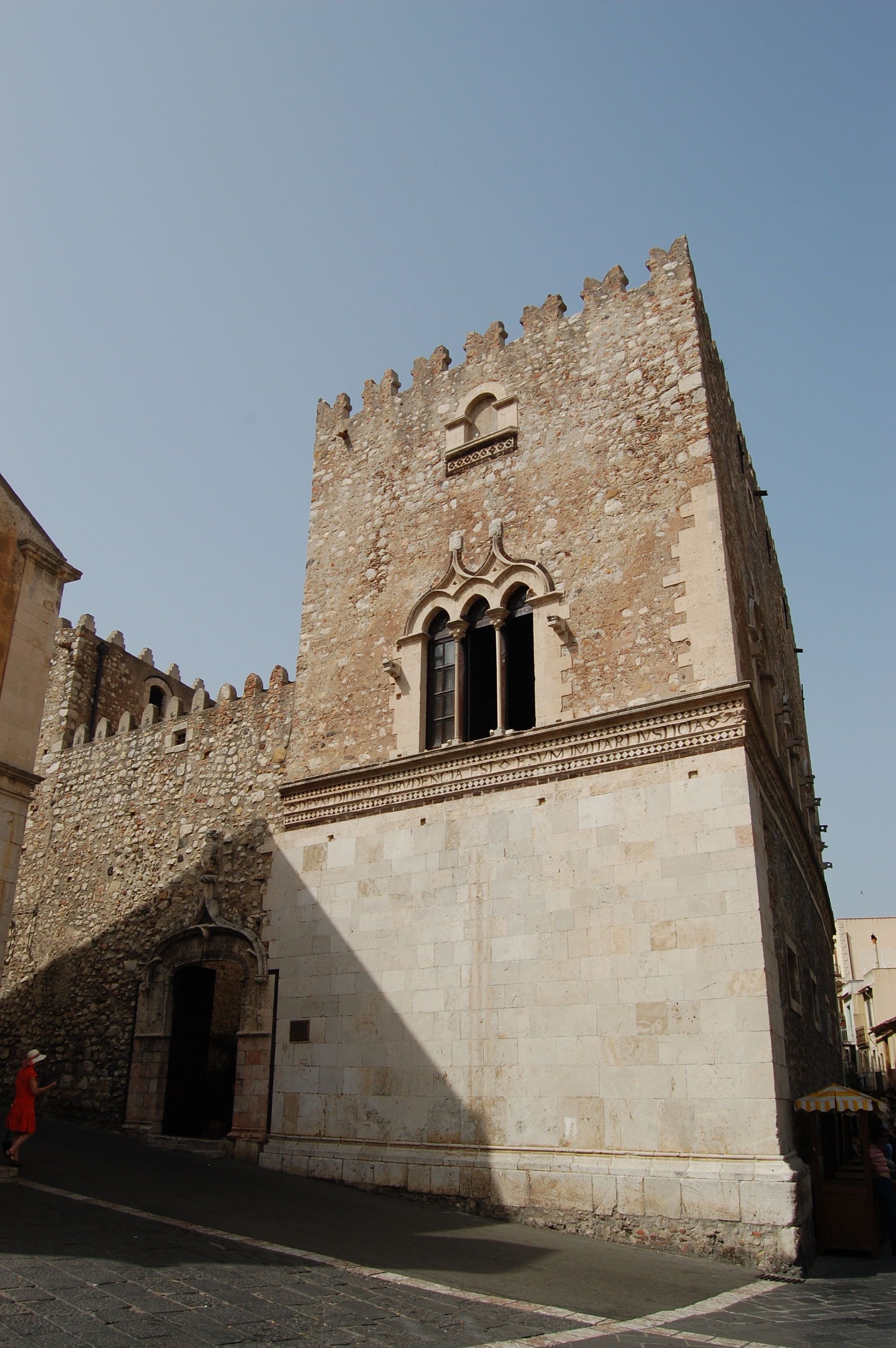
Palazzo Corvaja.

Palazzo Corvaja (sometimes spelt Palazzo Corvaia) is a medieval palace in Taormina, Sicily, Italy. It was principally built at the end of the 14th century and is named after one of the oldest and most prominent families of Taormina, which owned it from 1538 to 1945.

On four main floors and constructed around a courtyard, the Catalan Gothic palazzo is crenellated. The principal floor has fenestration of pairs of lancet windows divided by columns. The courtyard walls are decorated by reliefs illustrating The Creation.

Arab Tower in the Palazzo Corvaja: The tower was incorporated into other parts of the building from the end of the AD 13th century.

Today the palazzo is used as an exhibition centre.

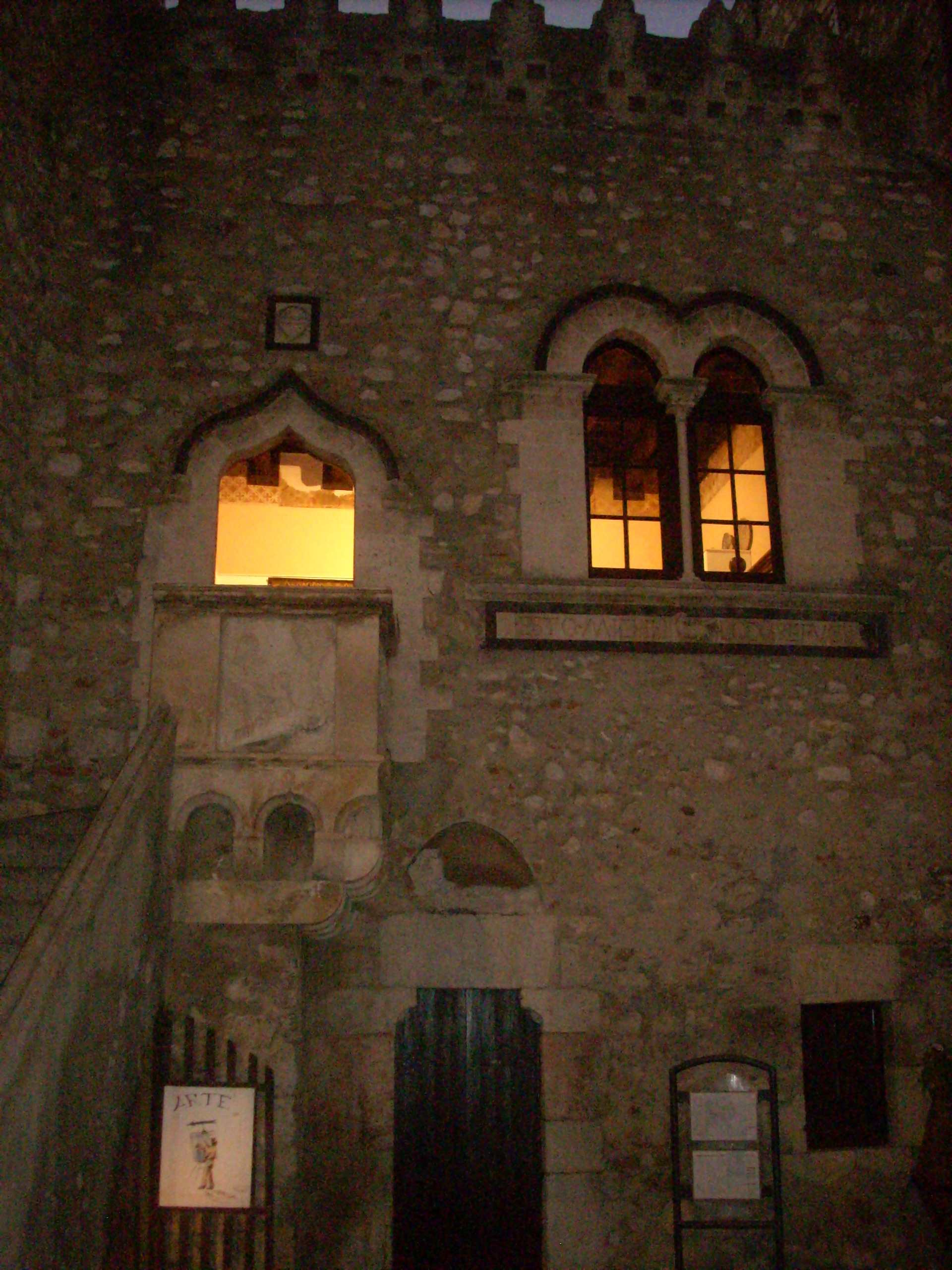
The inner courtyard of Corvaja Palace. Its Gothic influence can be seen in the style of the arched windows and doorways

== History ==
Corvaja Palace, which is located in Piazza Badia at right angles to the church of Saint Catherine of Alexandria, The origins of the palazzo incorporate an early Norman fortress dating from the 12th-14th century, which in turn was constructed on Roman foundations. It was subsequently added to over various periods up until the 15th century. Its main body is a Norman-style tower, and it has an inner courtyard where the Gothic influence can be seen in the arched windows and doorways. A 13th century staircase leads up to the first floor and an ornamental balcony which overlooks the courtyard.

In 1410, Corvaja Palace housed the Sicilian Parliament. It was renovated in 1945 by Armando Dillo, and as of 2009 it is the seat for the Azienda Autonoma Soggiorno e Turismo.

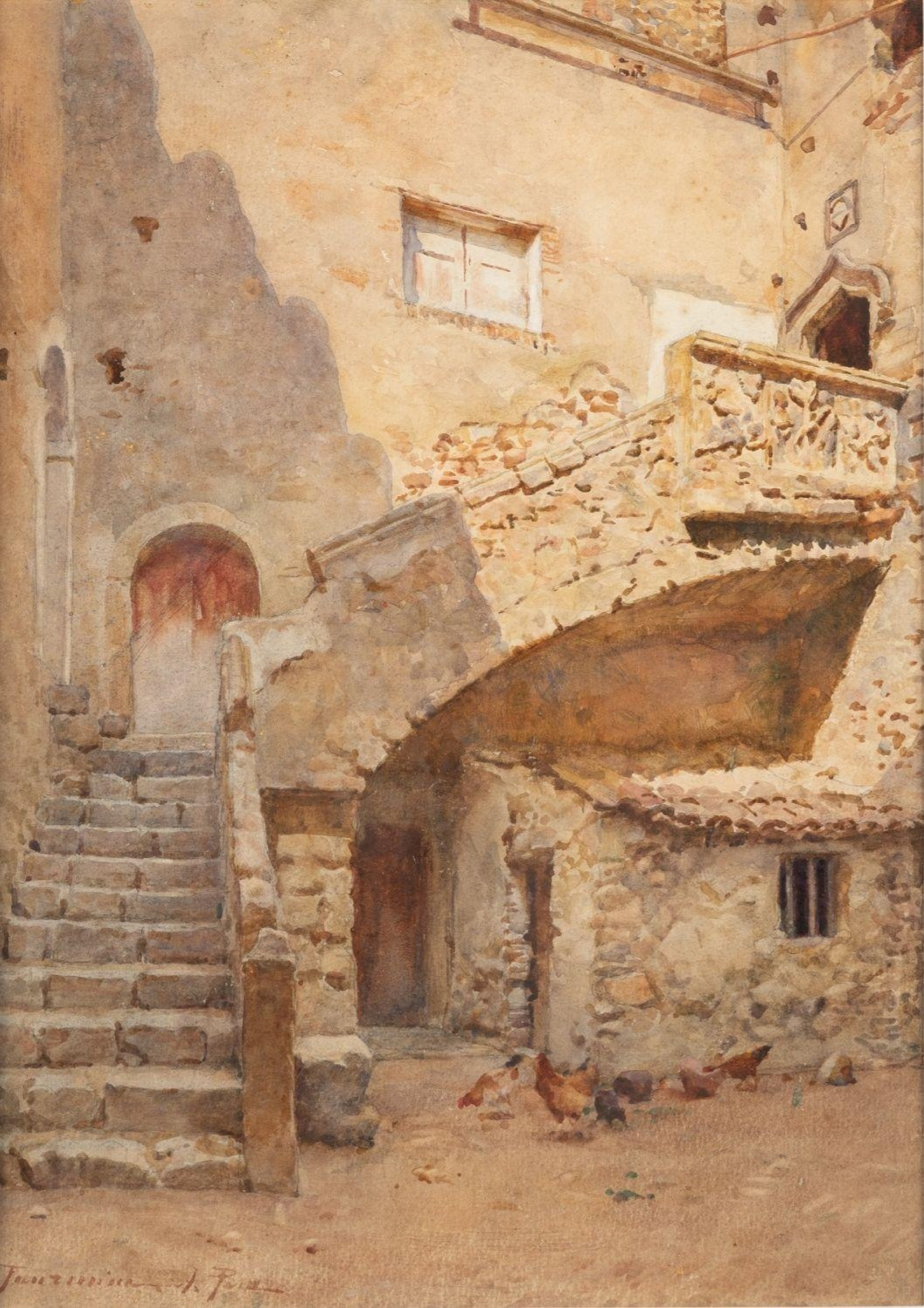
Alberto Pisa, Internal courtyard of Palazzo Corvaja, 1911 (private collection)

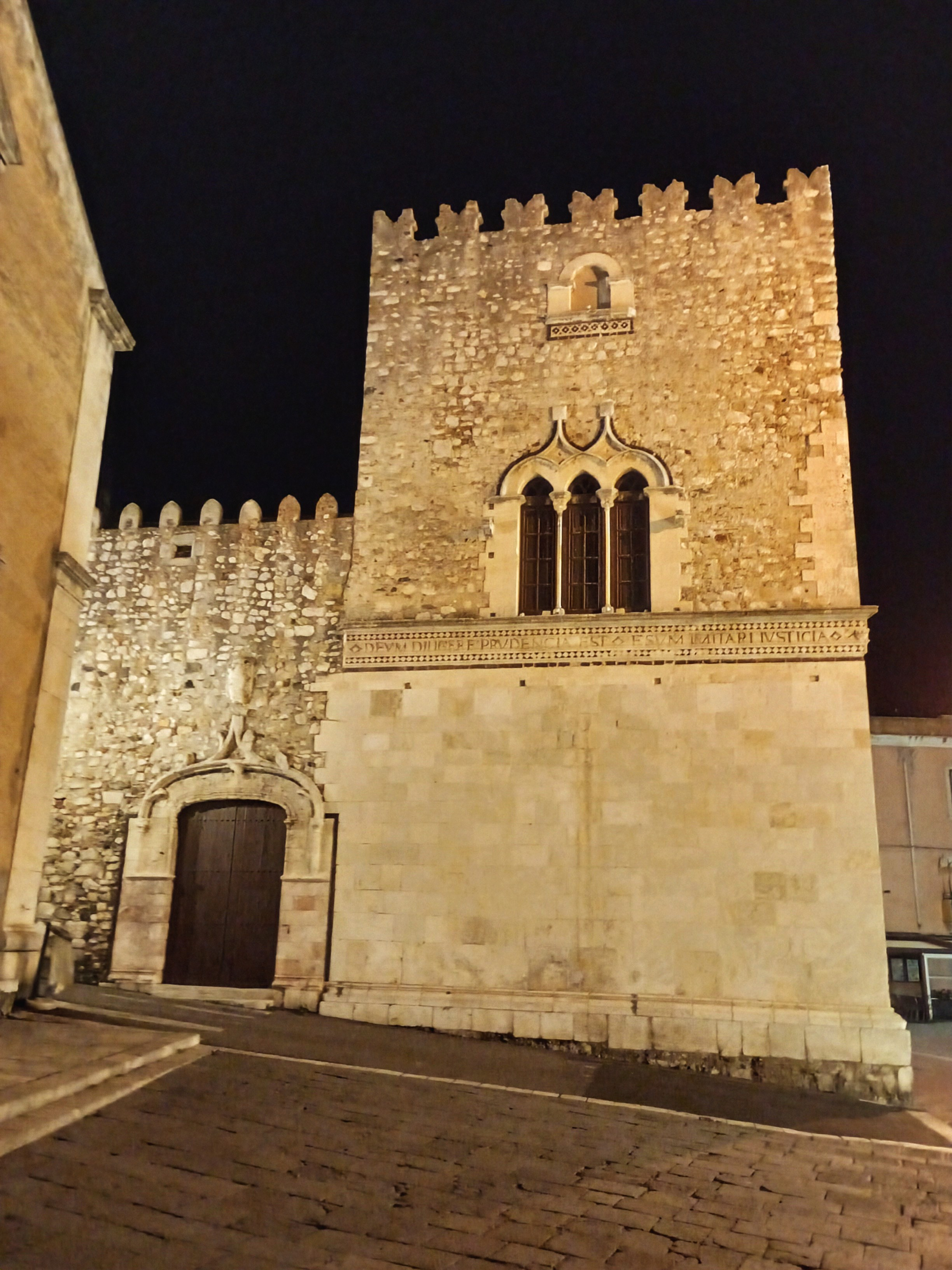
Exterior of Corvaja Palace

== Sources ==
- Taormina in Tasca, published by Dario Flaccovio Editore, June 2003 ISBN 88-7758-502-1

Studiereis: 417 434 435 441 44C 20 435 434 44F 442 20 441 43E 431 430 43A 443
