= Lessi =

Lessi is a given name and surname. Notable people with the name include:

- Luigi Lessi, manager of the Italian football club Reggina 1914 (1945–1946)
- Tito Lessi (1858–1917), Italian painter
- Lessi Peter-Vigboro, Miss Nigeria 2015
- nickname of Alessia Russo (born 1999), English footballer
