= Stefano Ussi =

Italian painter (1822–1901)

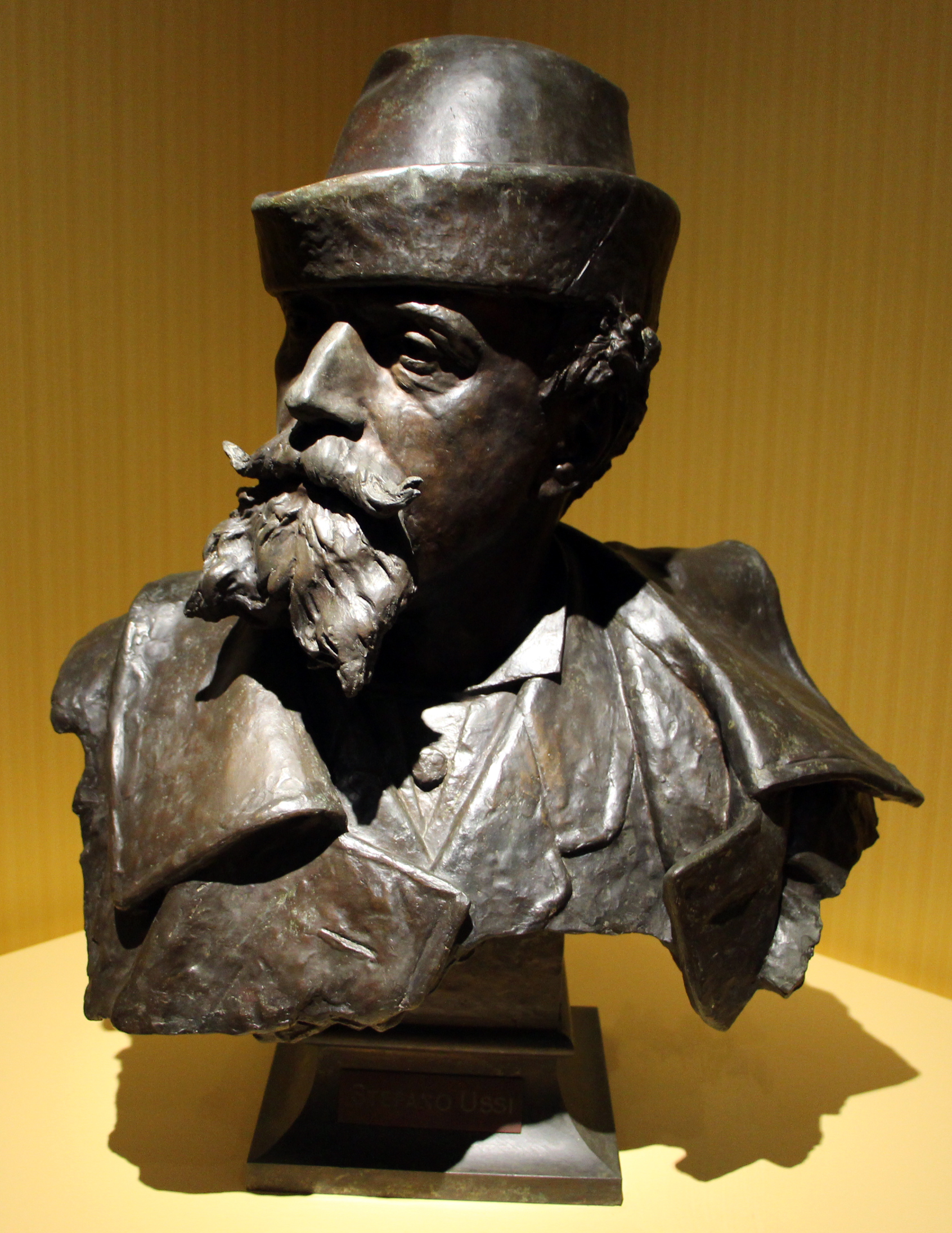
- Bust of Stefano Ussi by Ippazio Antonio Bortone
- Born: 3 September 1822; Florence, Grand Duchy of Tuscany
- Died: 1901 (aged 78–79); Florence, Italy
- Resting place: Cimitero Monumentale delle Porte Sante, Florence
- Education: Academy of Fine Arts, Florence
- Movement: Orientalist

Stefano Ussi (3 September 1822 – 1901) was an Italian painter, known first for his history paintings, and later for depicting Orientalist, mostly Arabian and Moroccan subjects.

== Biography ==
He was born in Florence and studied there at the Academy of Fine Arts under Enrico Pollastrini. Among his colleagues there were Pietro Benvenuti and Giuseppe Bezzuoli.

After studying at the Academy, he enrolled volunteer in the first war of independence, during which he was taken prisoner by the Austrian troops. After returning to Florence, he won the Triennale prize for the painting of the Resurrection of Lazarus in 1849, and presented works for the following years on historical and literary subjects at the exhibitions of the Florentine Società Promotrice di Belle Arti, which was led by Filippo Palizzi.

Associated with the Macchiaioli group of painters gravitating around the Caffè Michelangiolo, he achieved great success with The Expulsion of the Duke of Athens (Florence, Galleria d’Arte Moderna, Palazzo Pitti), exhibited in Florence at the city's first Esposizione Nazionale in 1861 and was awarded a prize in Paris in 1867. This painting represents the expulsion in the 14th century by the Florentines of the tyrannical ruler of Florence, Walter VI, Count of Brienne and former Duke of Athens. An allegorical fresco (after 1343) of the event had been memorialized in the Palazzo Vecchio by Orcagna, who had lived through the events. In Ussi's time, the medieval events took on new patriotic connotations as the Italian Kingdom was being consolidated.

Ussi is considered one of the Orientalist painters of the Ottocento. He visited Egypt in 1869 on the occasion of the opening of the Suez Canal, and returned in 1872 by invitation of the Khedive. Along with his friend, the painter Cesare Biseo, and Edmondo De Amicis, he accompanied and an Italian diplomatic delegation to Morocco in 1875. De Amicis was later to publish the work of the artists. The numerous drawings he made during these travels provided material for him in later years.

The Viceroy of Egypt commissioned a large canvas depicting: The Feast of the Carpet or Pilgrimage to Mecca. In 1880, in Turin he displayed La Scorta del governatore Ben Alida ed il giovanetto suo figlio che precedono l'Ambasciata italiana; Moroccan Fantasy in honor of the Italian Embassy; and The Arab Family in the Desert. In 1881 at Milan, he exhibited Celebration of Mohammed in Tangier, another orientalist genre painting. He also displayed Un intermediario d'amore. Among his other works are Arab Cavalry; Fantasia araba attorno all'Ambasciata italiana al Marocco; Festa a Fez, data dall'Imperatore del Marocco; Araba al fonte; and Un Dervish in pompa solenne. His painting of Donna araba al pozzo (1880) is displayed in the Museo Borgogna of Vercelli.

He died in Florence.

== Selected paintings ==
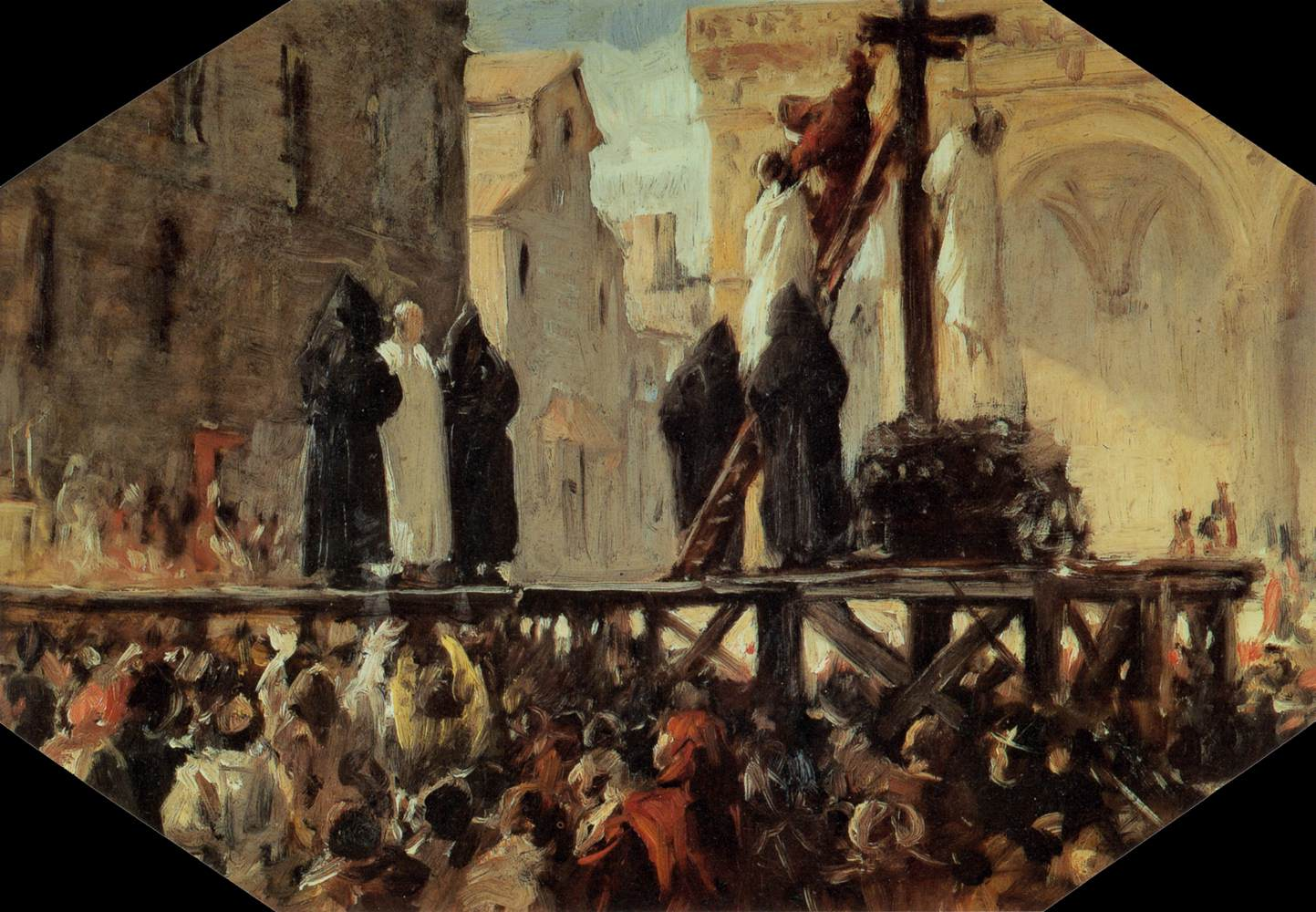
The Execution of Savonarola

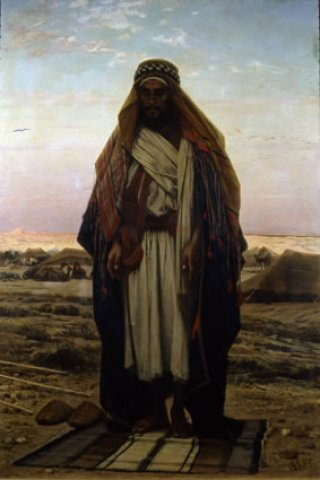
Preacher in the Desert

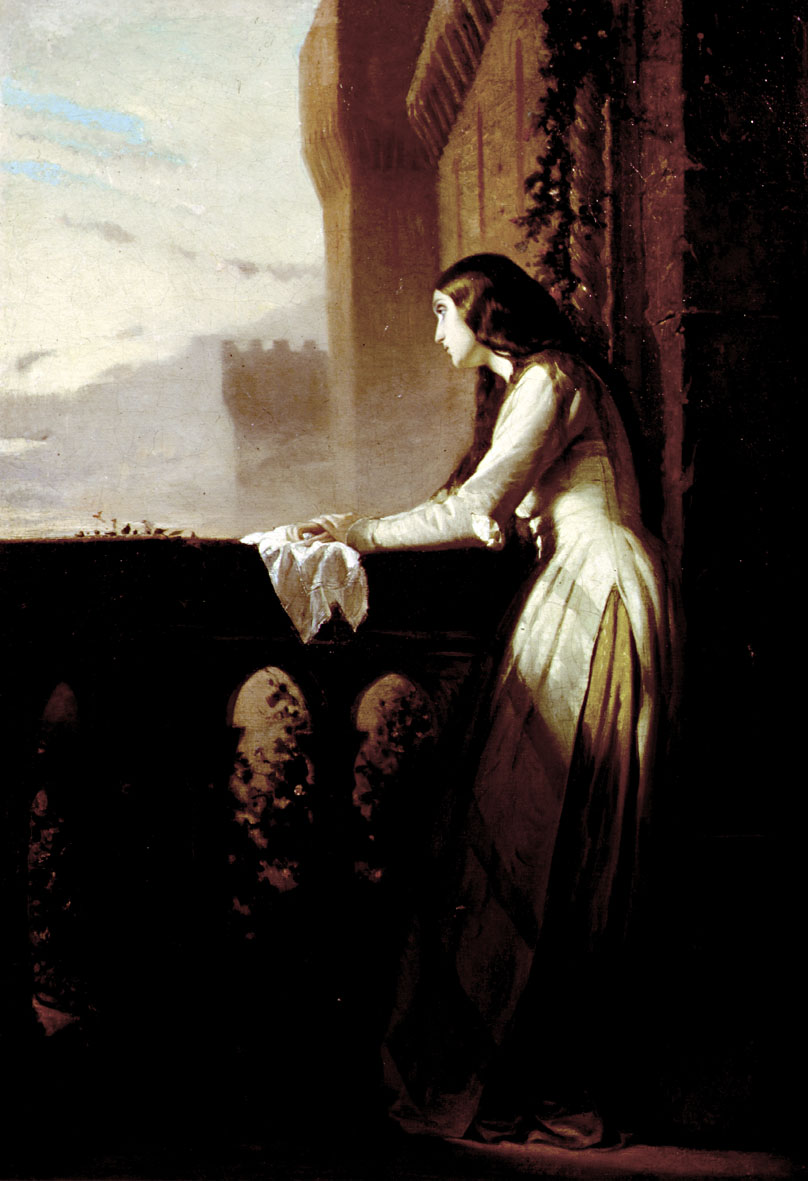
Pia de' Tolomei

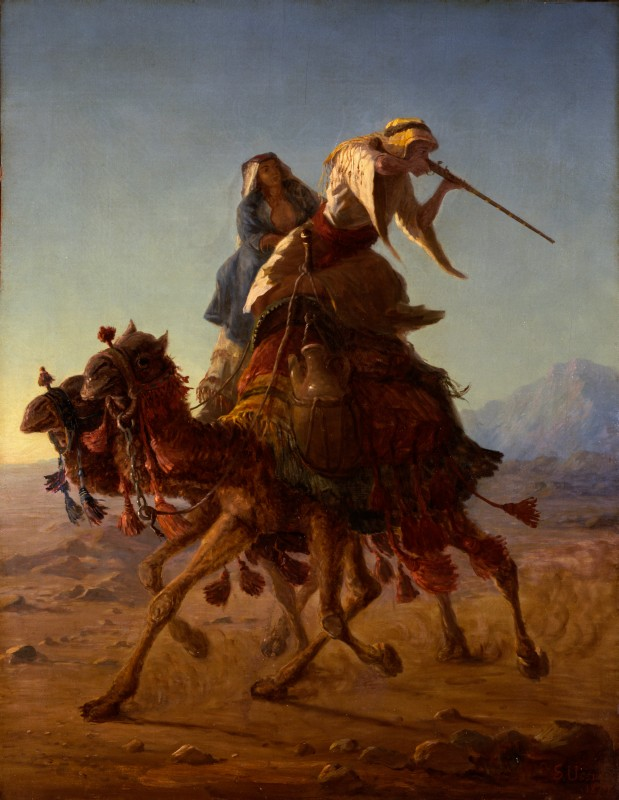
Bedouin on Camel

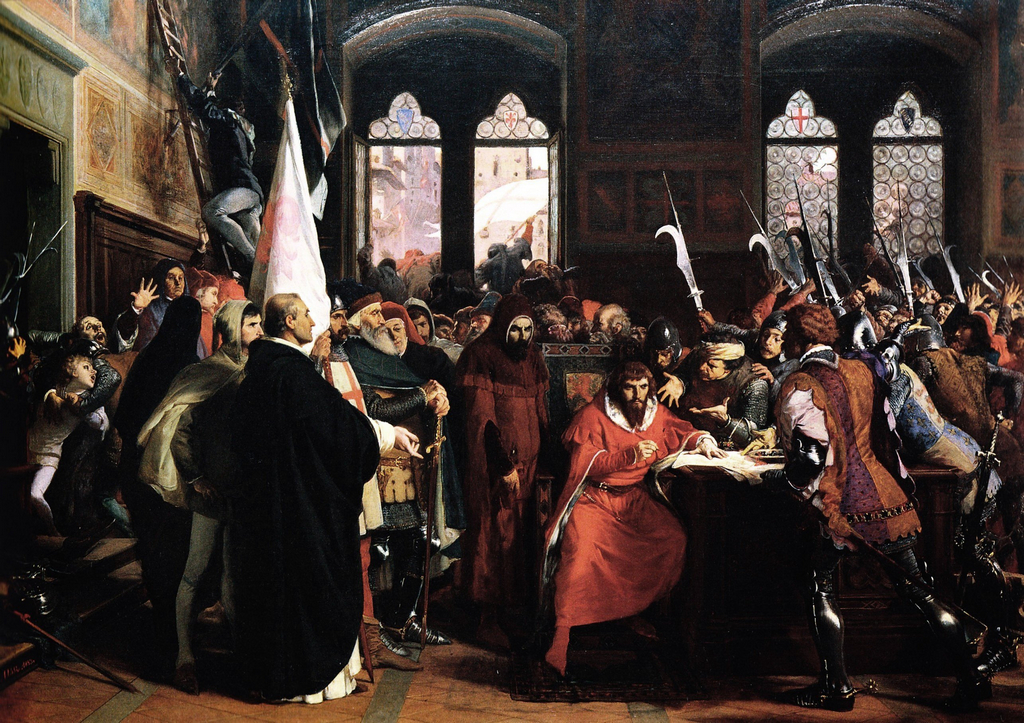
Expulsion of the Duke of Athens

== See also ==
- List of Orientalist artists
- Orientalism

== Other projects ==
Media related to Stefano Ussi at Wikimedia Commons
