= Francesco Bartolini =

Italian architect (1831–1914)

- Born: 2 February 1831; Pistoia, Grand Duchy of Tuscany
- Died: 18 November 1914 (aged 83); Pistoia, Kingdom of Italy
- Education: Accademia di Belle Arti di Firenze
- Occupations: Architect, civil engineer
- Spouse: Louisa Grace Bartolini

Francesco Bartolini (2 February 1831 – 18 November 1914) was an Italian architect and civil engineer active mainly in his native Tuscany.

== Life and career ==
Bartolini was born in Pistoia in 1831 and studied at the Accademia di Belle Arti di Firenze. In 1867, he became a teacher of ornamental drawing and geometry at technical schools and published a manual based on his course.

In 1860, Bartolini married the Irish poet Louisa Grace, who was connected to literary circles of the Italian Risorgimento. After her death in 1865 he collected her manuscripts and donated them, together with her personal library, to the Biblioteca Marucelliana in Florence. In 1870 he edited and published a collection of her poems.

Bartolini died in Pistoia in 1914.

== Works ==
Bartolini worked on architectural and engineering projects in Pistoia and surrounding areas. Notable works include:

- Adaptation of Villa Banchieri in Castelmartini.
- Restoration of the Pistoia Baptistery and the bell tower of Pistoia Cathedral.
- Collaboration on the Apennine railway design.
- Renovation of the Puccini orphanage and construction works for the Puccini kindergarten in the park of Scornio, based on a design by engineer Angelo Gamberai.
- Design and works for the façade of the Episcopal Palace of Pistoia.
- Projects for the new headquarters of the Cassa di Risparmio di Pistoia.
- Works on the Palazzo degli Anziani (town hall) and the façade of the Pistoia railway station.

== Archives ==
Documents related to Bartolini's professional activity are preserved in the State Archives of Pistoia, with part of the collection held by the Biblioteca Forteguerriana.

== Sources ==
- Guazzini, Lorenzo (1914). "Francesco Bartolini". Bullettino storico pistoiese (3/4).
- Insabato, Elisabetta; Ghelli, Cecilia (2007). Guida agli archivi di architetti e ingegneri del Novecento in Toscana. Florence: Edifir.
- Mauro, Silvia (2015). L'incanto malefico: L'Esposizione circondariale di Pistoia del 1899. Pistoia: Settegiorni.
- Simoni, Ginevra (2004). "L'archivio di Francesco Bartolini (1831–1914), ingegnere e architetto a Pistoia". Storia locale. Quaderni pistoiesi di cultura moderna e contemporanea. II (4).
