= Egisto Ferroni =

Italian painter (1835–1912)

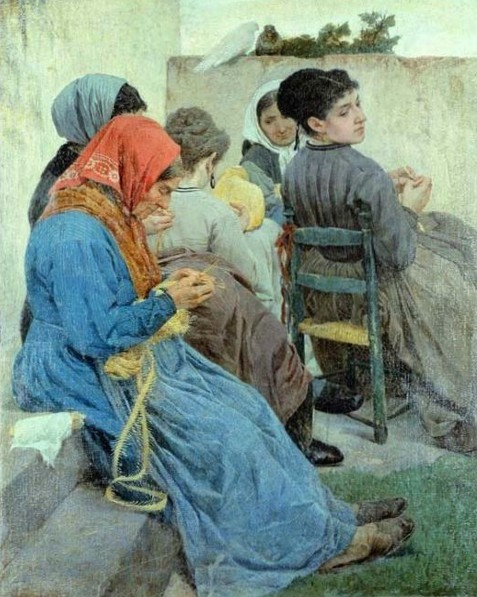
The Braiders

Egisto Ferroni (14 December 1835 – 25 May 1912) was an Italian painter, specializing in pastoral, rural, and genre subjects.

== Life and work ==
He was born in Lastra a Signa. His father, Egiziano, was a Master stonemason. He had originally intended to follow him into the trade, but later chose to study at the Accademia di Belle Arti di Firenze, where his instructors included Enrico Pollastrini, Stefano Ussi and Antonio Ciseri. His early paintings were on historical subjects.

His first work of any note was created in 1868; a painting called Le trecciaiole (The Braiders), which he presented at the Society for the Encouragement of the Arts. It made a critical impression as its monumental size was atypical for genre works of that nature. In general, his figures were portrayed in a severe, realistic manner, which brought him into conflict with his agent, Luigi Pisani, who wanted scenes that were more "polite". Fortunately, he was able to find a wealthy patron, Gioacchino Herts, Count of Frassineto, who supported him for over twenty years.

In 1878, he presented two works at the Exposition Universelle in Paris. He also participated in the International Exposition at Rome in 1883, where his works were featured with those by Giovanni Fattori, Eugenio Cecconi, and other members of the Macchiaioli. His career was interrupted by a long spell of depression, brought on by the death of his son, Raffaele, in 1891. He had recovered by 1897, and was invited to participate in the Biennale di Venezia.

He preferred to spend time alone in the countryside, out of the limelight. Despite this, he managed to amass a considerable fortune. He died in Florence at the home of his son, Arrigo, with whom he had lived since 1908. Within two decades of his death, his work was largely forgotten.

== Sources ==
- Biography from the Dizionario Biografico degli Italiani @ Treccani
- Andrea Baldinotti and Vincenzo Farinella, Pittura dei campi. Egisto Ferroni e il naturalismo europeo, Torino, Umberto Allemandi editore, 2002 ISBN 978-88-7781-448-7
