= Cesare Bartolena =

Italian painter (1830–1903)

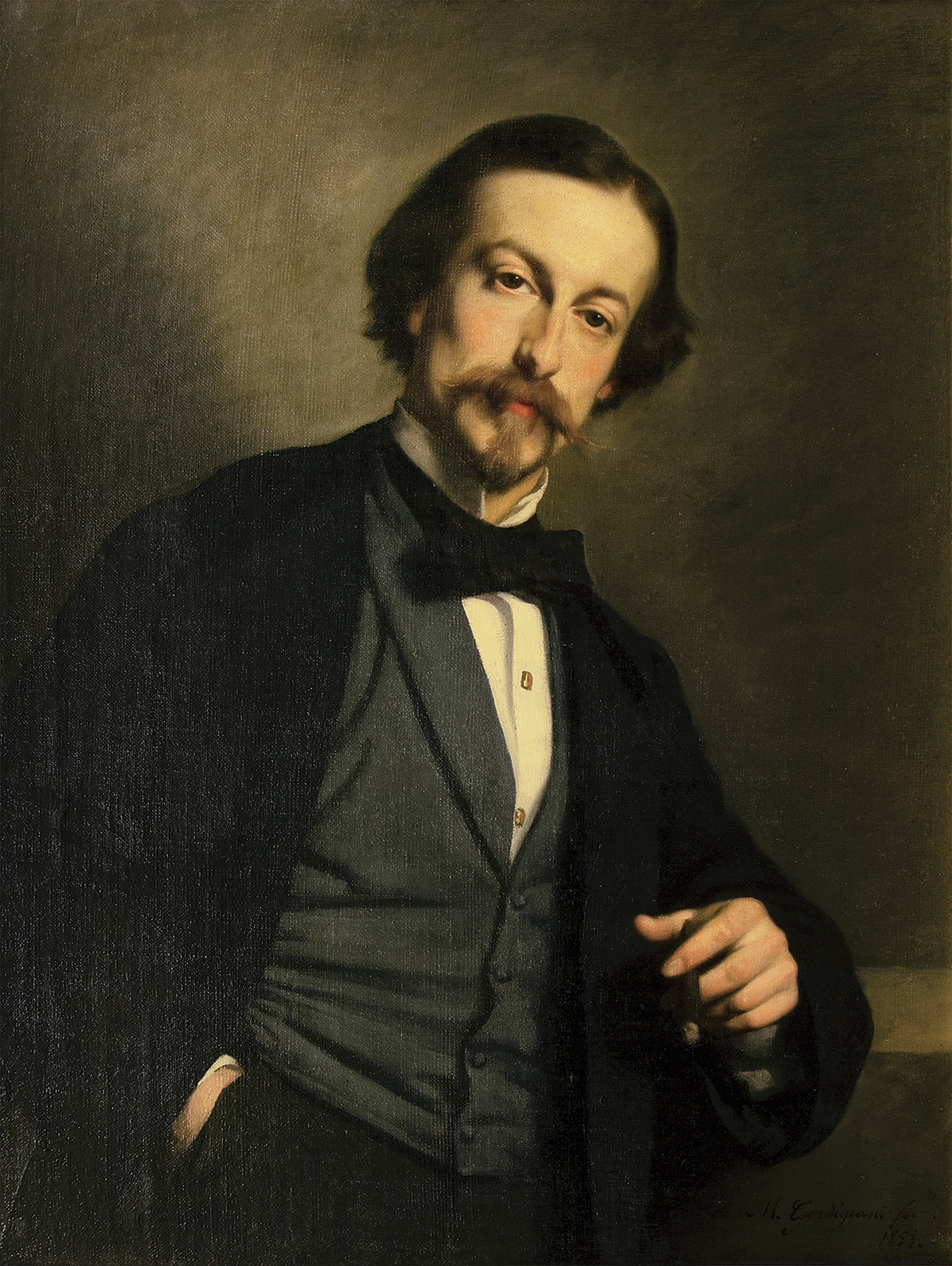

Cesare Bartolena (May 27, 1830 – May 14, 1903) was an Italian painter, mainly of military or battle scenes.

== Biography ==
He was born in Livorno. He was a pupil of Enrico Pollastrini, and attended the Academy of Fine Arts, Florence. In 1848, he volunteered in battles for Italian independence. He was among the artists who frequented the Caffè Michelangiolo in Florence. There he met his contemporary battle painter Giovanni Fattori. Bartolena also painted some religious pieces.

Along with the French photographer Alphonse Bernoud, Cesare opened a photography studio, but it failed, placing the now elderly painter in precarious financial straits. He resumed painting, mainly small paintings. His grandson Giovanni Bartolena was also a painter in Livorno. Among Cesare's works are:

- La partenza dei volontari livornesi per la guerra di Sicilia (Exhibited in Milan in 1872, now in Museo Civico Giovanni Fattori, Livorno)
- Campo militare e Avanguardia (Exhibited at Società d'Incoraggiamento a Florence, 1884)
- La morte del generale Cosimo Del Fante (Exposizione di Belle Arti di Milan a Florence, 1886)
- Agricoltura e Milizia (Esposizione Nazionale Artistica di Venezia)
- Soldati in marcia dalla manovra (Esposizione Nazionale Artistica di Venezia)
- Al campo
- Soldati in marcia dalla manovra
- La chiamata
- La partenza del coscritto
- La madre del soldato (1875)
- Bersaglieri nel Bosco (1878)
- Agricoltura e Milizia
- Sentinella
- La cattiva notizia
