= Ruffano =

Ruffano Rufàna (Greek)
- Comune
- Comune di Ruffano
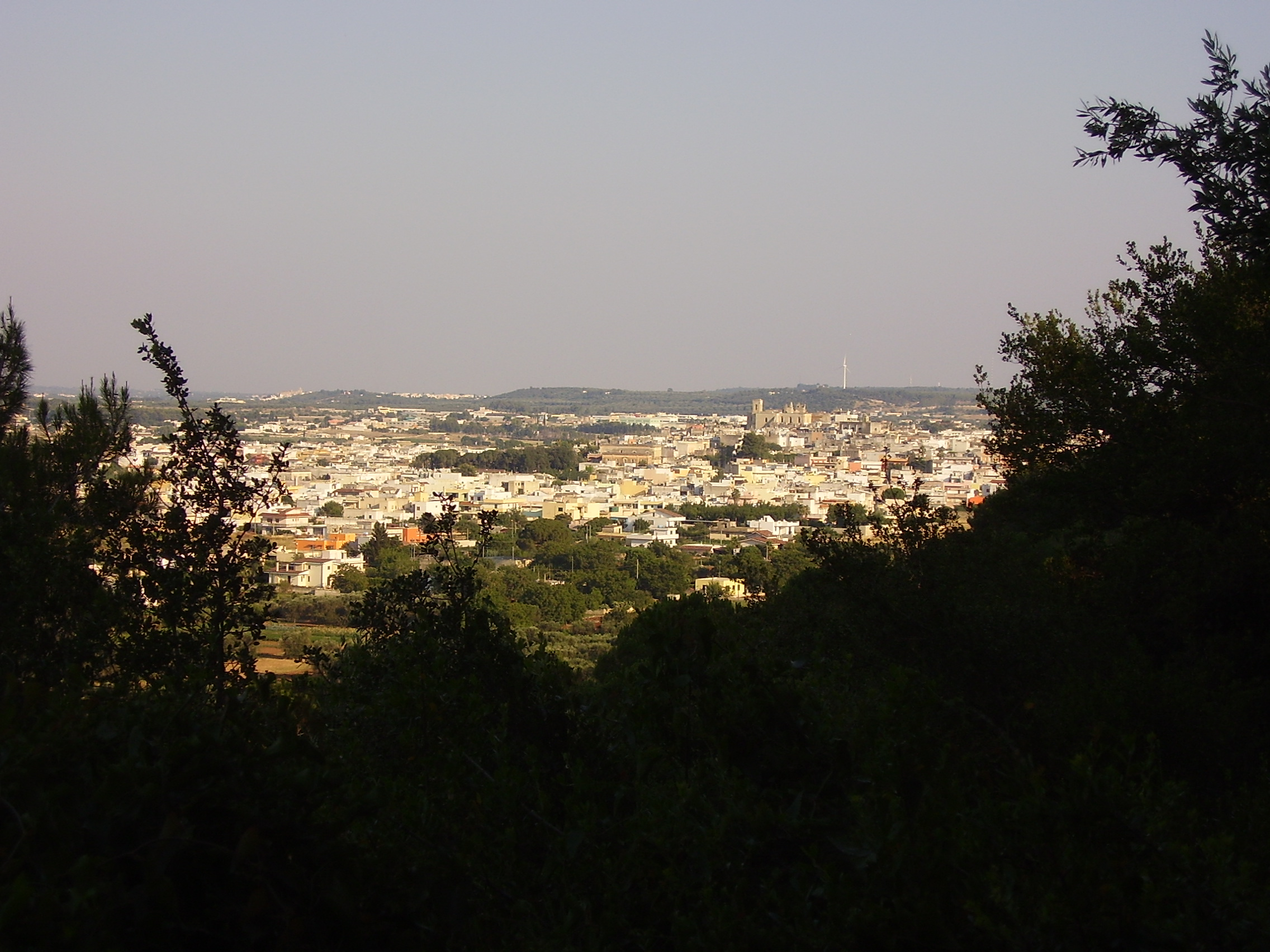
- View of Ruffano

- Coat of arms

- Location within Italy Location within Apulia
- Coordinates: 39°58′59″N 18°14′56″E
- Country: Italy
- Region: Apulia
- Province: Lecce (LE)
- Frazioni: Torrepaduli

Government
  - Mayor: Antonio Rocco Cavallo

Area
  - Total: 39 km^{2} (15 sq mi)
- Elevation: 127 m (417 ft)

Population (31 December 2010)
  - Total: 9,724
  - Density: 250/km^{2} (650/sq mi)
- Demonym: Ruffanesi
- Time zone: UTC+1 (CET)
  - Summer (DST): UTC+2 (CEST)
- Postal code: 73049
- Dialing code: 0833
- Patron saint: St. Antony of Padua
- Website: Official website

Ruffano (Salentino: Rufanu) is a town and comune in the province of Lecce, located in the Apulia region of southeast Italy.

== Main sights ==
- Mother church of Natività della Beata Maria Vergine (1706–1713)
- Church of Madonna del Carmine, built in the 16th century above a Byzantine cave church from the 12th century
- Castello Brancaccio, a castle overlooking the town (1626)
- Crucifix Crypt, near the boundary with Casarano
- Grotta della Trinità ("Trinity Grotto"), used since Neolithic times. Starting from the 9th century, it housed a community of hermit monks and in the 11th century, it was turned into a religious place, as testified by remains of Byzantine frescoes.
