= Ippazio Antonio Bortone =

Italian sculptor (1847–1938)

Ippazio Antonio Bortone (1847, in Ruffano – 1938, in Lecce) was an Italian sculptor, active for many years in Florence.

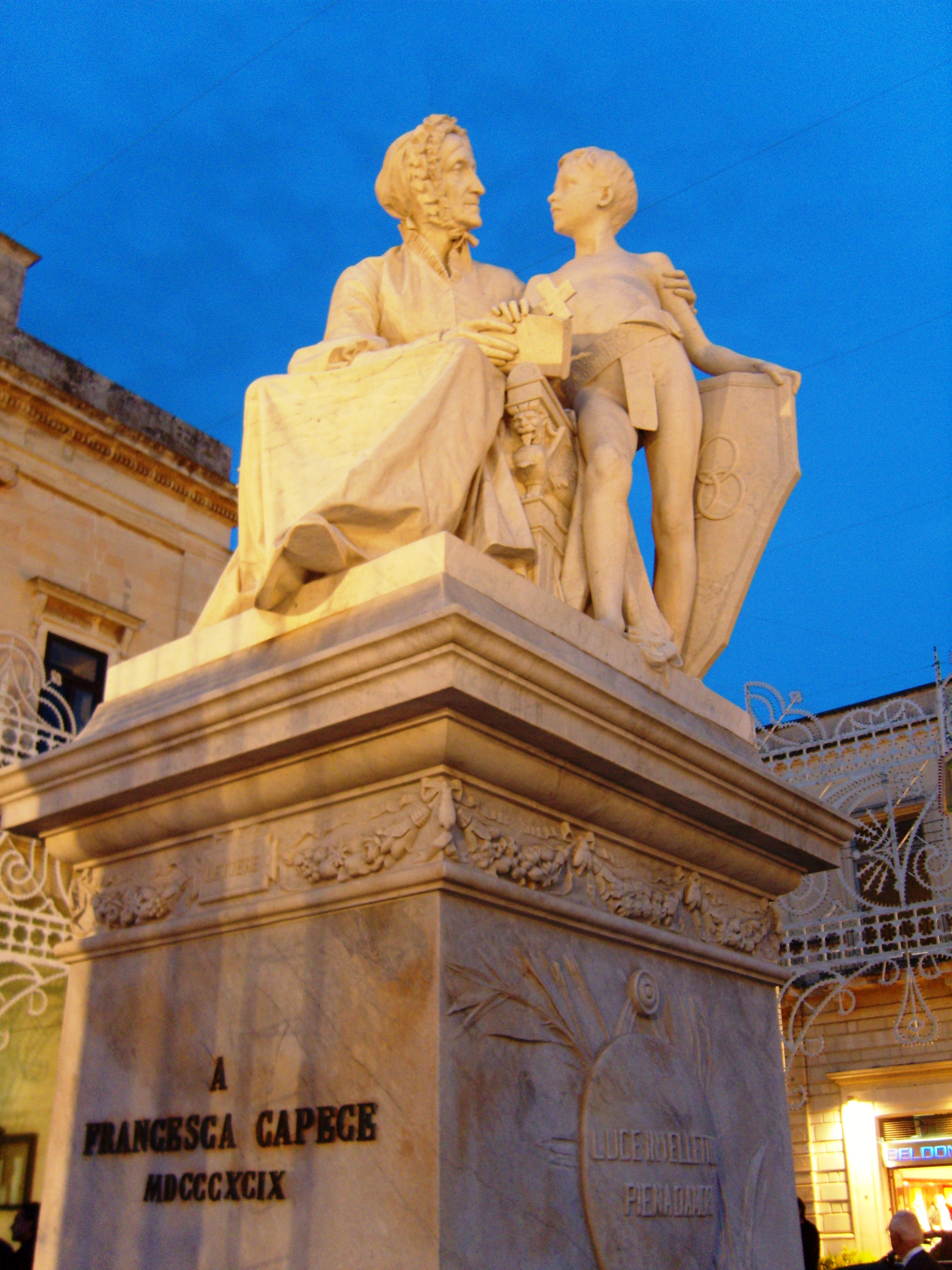
Monument to Francesca Capece in Maglie, Province of Lecce

He was born in Ruffano, near the city of Lecce in the Province of Lecce in the region of Apulia in Southern Italy. He completed his study at the Academy of Fine Arts of Naples, and became honorary professor of that Academy, as well as the Academies of Florence and Lecce. He was also admitted into various orders of knight hood, including named to the Order of the Crown of Italy by King Vittorio Emanuele III, and to the Order of Santi Maurizio e Lazzaro, by King Umberto I following the inauguration of his monument to Quintino Sella in Biella (won commission by competition).

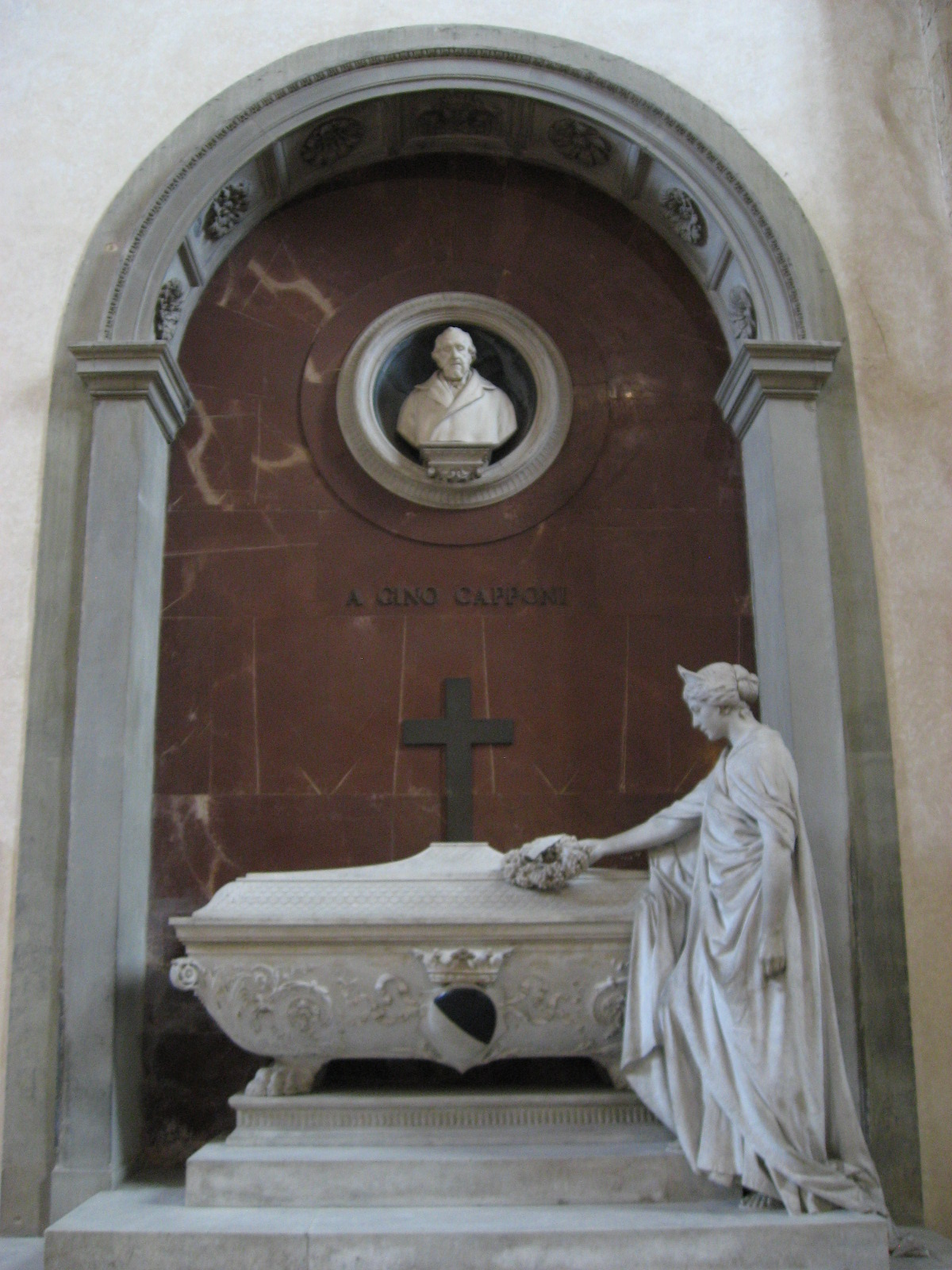
Monument to Gino Capponi in Santa Croce, Florence.

Among his works are Gladiator, Hippocrates, Moliere, Religious Charity; and il Fanfulla, (which won awards at the 1887 Exhibition of Paris del 1887. For the facade of Santa Maria del Fiore, he sculpted two statues: San Giacomo Minore and San Antonino; and two medallions: Giotto and Michelangelo. He also completed the monument to marchese Gino Capponi for Santa Croce in Florence (won the commission by competition); Bust of King Vittorio Emanuele III of Italy at the National Parliament; bust of Gino Capponi for a hall of the city Hall of Florence; and a bust of the illustrator of Dante's works, Giambattista Giuliani.
