= Louisa Grace Bartolini =

British writer and artist

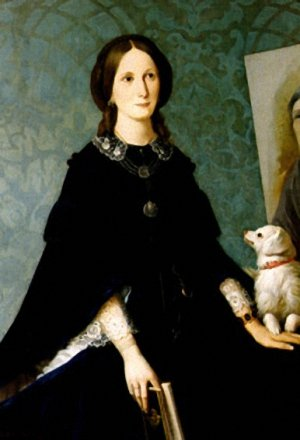
- Born: 14 February 1818; Bristol, England
- Died: 3 May 1865 (aged 47); Pistoia, Italy
- Known for: painting, drawing, poetry
- Spouse: Francesco Bartolini

Louisa Grace Bartolini (14 February 1818 – 3 May 1865) was a British writer and artist known as the "Virgin of Ossian".

She was born Louisa Grace in Bristol into an Irish Catholic family of Italian descent; all four of the children were taught Italian. Her father was Sir William Grace, a baronet. In 1828, the family moved to Sorèze, where she completed her early studies in art and languages. Her first poems were written in Italian and French. She came to Tuscany in the late 1830s. In 1841, she moved to Pistoia. She contributed to various periodicals including La gioventù and La Rivista di Firenze. She also translated works by American and British contemporary poets into Italian.

Bartolini's salon attracted the top Italian intellectuals of her time, including Giosuè Carducci.

In 1860, she married Francesco Bartolini, an engineer from Pistoia.

Bartolini died in Pistoia at the age of 47.

Her artwork, which includes charcoal drawings, watercolours and oil paintings, and manuscripts are held in the Biblioteca Marucelliana in Florence. In 1998, the Biblioteca held an exhibition of her work entitled La vergine d'Ossian ("The Virgin of Ossian").
