= Luigi Bechi =

Italian painter (1830–1919)

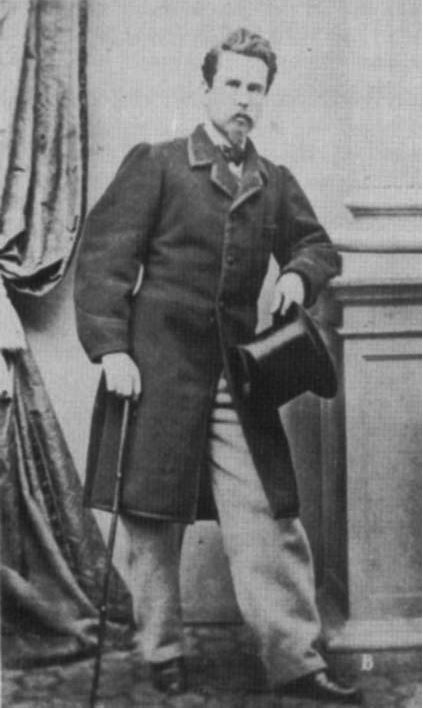
Luigi Bechi (date unknown)

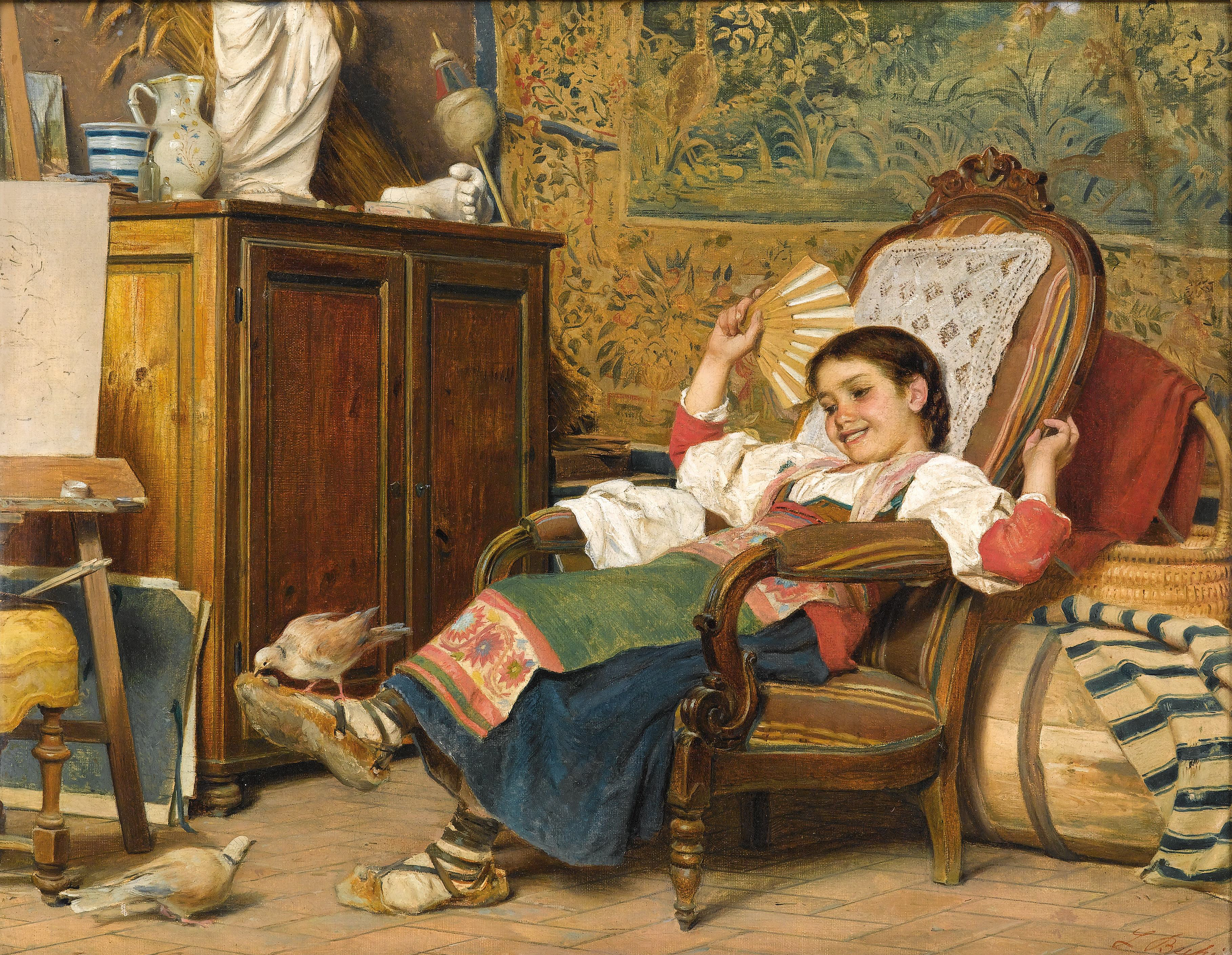
The Pet Doves

Luigi Bechi (March 1830 – November 19, 1919) was an Italian genre painter; associated with the Macchiaioli.

== Life and work ==
He was born in Florence. He initially studied art at the Accademia di Belle Arti with Giuseppe Bezzuoli and Enrico Pollastrini. As an Italian patriot, he interrupted his education to join the Piedmontese Army as an artilleryman and fight in the Second Italian War of Independence, against the Austrians.

He made his public debut in 1861, at the Esposizione nazionale italiana, with his depiction of Michelangelo, watching over Urbino, his dying servant. In 1866, he once again fought for Italian independence, joining Garibaldi in Trentino. He was wounded and taken prisoner in the Battle of Bezzecca.

In 1870, he was able to obtain a position as Professor at the Accademia. While he cultivated historical paintings, he also painted landscapes, pastoral scenes, and genre paintings, which were his most popular. During his professorship, his works became more generic and conventional. Among his best known works are scenes of Hagar being banished by Abraham, and General Ettore de Sonnaz, being saved by the Marchese Fadini at the Battle of Montebello.

After his retirement, he spent his final years in solitude. He died in Florence; aged eighty-nine. His works continued to be popular with British and German collectors, long after he had been forgotten in Italy.
