= State Archives of Pistoia =

State archival institution in Pistoia, Italy

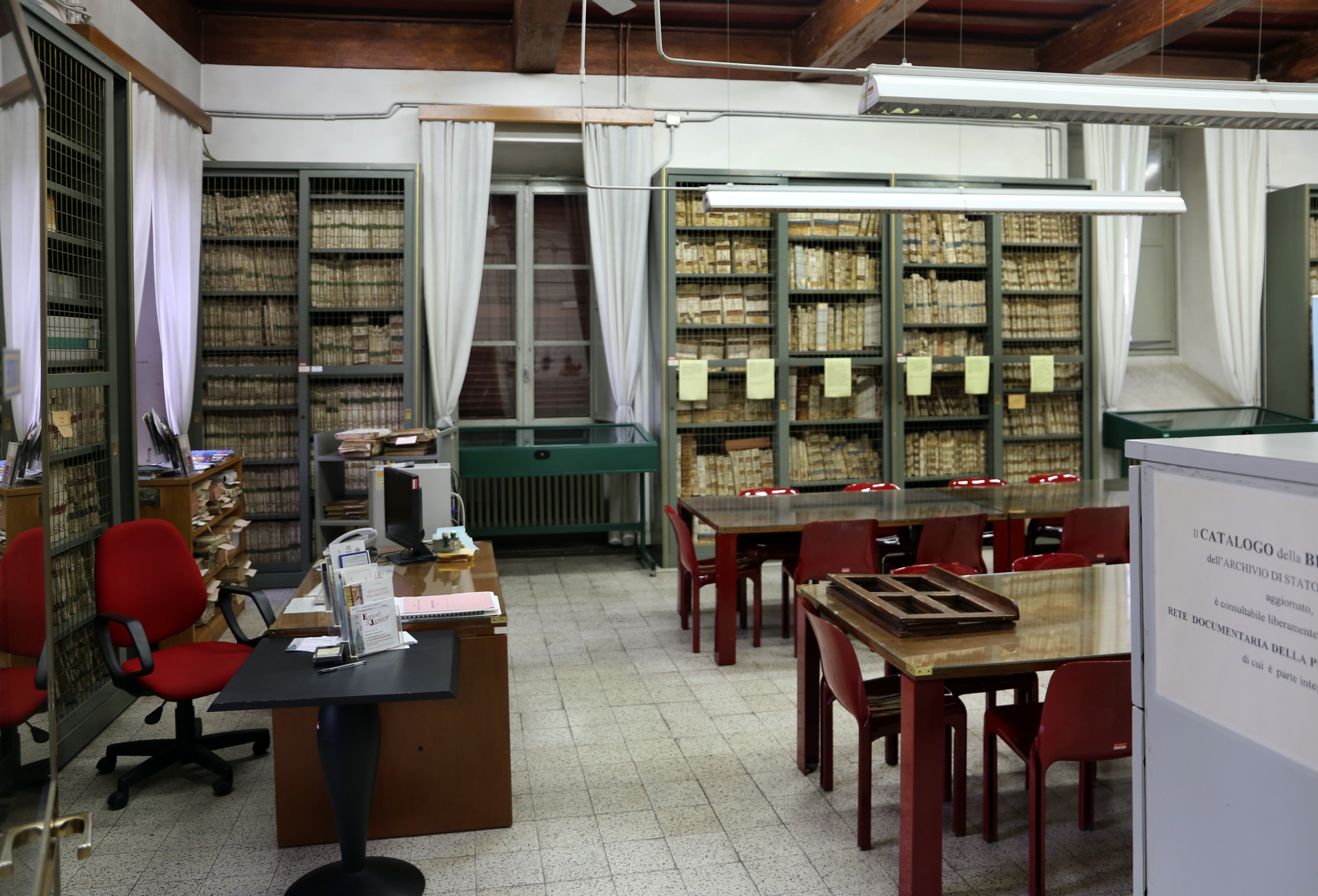
- Interactive map of State Archives of Pistoia
- 43°56′06″N 10°54′59″E
- Location: Pistoia, Tuscany, Italy
- Type: State archive
- Established: 1941
- Website: http://www.archiviodistatopistoia.beniculturali.it

The State Archives of Pistoia (Italian: Archivio di Stato di Pistoia) is a state archive located in Pistoia, Tuscany, Italy. It is a peripheral office of the Italian Ministry of Culture responsible for preserving historical records produced by public institutions in the province of Pistoia, as well as other archival collections of historical significance acquired through deposits, donations, or purchases.

Established as a Section in 1941 and fully recognized in 1963, the archive preserves documentation from municipal offices, religious institutions, charitable organizations, and notable private families. Holdings include records from the Opera di San Jacopo, the Cadastre, ecclesiastical property, orphanages, hospitals, and archives of political organizations such as the National Fascist Party and the Provincial Committee of National Liberation.

It also includes the Pescia Section.

== Sources ==
- "Archivio di Stato di Pistoia" (PDF). Guida generale degli Archivi di Stato italiani. Vol. III (N-R). Rome: Ministero per i beni culturali e ambientali. Ufficio centrale per i beni archivistici. 1986. pp. 717–800.
