= Luigi Archinti =

Italian painter

Luigi Archinti (1825 – Milan, February 5, 1902) was an Italian art historian, art critic, and painter.

Born to an aristocratic family in Milan. He studied at the Venetian Academy of Fine Arts (1842-1848), and then in Accademia Albertina (1850) in Turin. He frequented the Caffè della Calcina in Venice, a hangout for Italian patriots including Pietro Selvatico. In 1859, he fought with Piedmontese at the battle of Montebello, he left Venice after the Republic of San Marco (Venice) fell to Austrians in 1849. He then traveled through Europe.

He published criticisms and illustrations, often under pseudonyms, including the anagram of Luigi Chirtani, or Tarchini, or under the initials A. L. In the journal Diritto he publishes with his full name. His articles are described as onesti e briosi (honest and spirited). He also wrote short novels.

He was a soldier and enlisted as a Bersaglierie for Vignola, and fought in Monte Pelago and Monte Pulito in the Wars of Italian Independence, later in a campaign against brigands in Calabria and Abbruzzi. In 1869 he fought and earned a silver medal at the battle of Monte Croce, and retired in 1871, with a medal of military valor, as a lieutenant of Bersaglieri. His paintings are few, and typically depict historical events or battles. In 1888, he became professor of Art History at the Accademia di Brera and member of the commission for conservation of monuments in Lombardy.

Among his books, are encyclopedic reviews of world art across the centuries such as Le meraviglie delle arti: Architettura e scultura Volume 1, co-written by Luigi Archinti (Chirtani), André Lefèvre, Louis Viardot; Editors: Fratelli Treves, Milan 1881. He also published Degli stili nell'architettura (1895) and La patria di Pietro Micca (1883).
