= Alberto Pisa =

Italian painter (1864–1936)

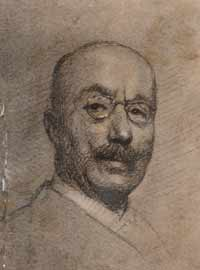
Alberto Pisa Portrait

Alberto Pisa (March 19, 1864 – 1936) was an Italian painter, often painting ruins, landscapes, and garden views in bright watercolor.

== Early life and education ==
He was born in Ferrara and initially studied there with Gaetano Domenichini. He later studied at the Academy of Fine Arts of Florence, where he had the opportunity to approach the Macchiaioli group.

== Career ==
His first work was a Church Interior, displayed at the Promotrice. In 1887, he sent to the Exposition of Venice, the canvases depicting the Church of Santa Maria Novella, and the genre painting Donne e Madonne. In 1888 at Bologna, he exhibited: Tempo ladro and Fra i polli. In 1889 at the Florence Promotrice, he displayed the oil canvas, Le lavandaie and a pastel, Il fiammiferaio. At the Pisani Gallery of Florence, he exhibited watercolor and pastel works. He also painted portraits in Ferrara. He completed illustrations for books and journals, and completed a number of watercolors depicting vedute of Rome, Pompeii, and Florence.

The British collections include two local views: Westminster Bridge at Lancaster City Museums, and Hampstead Heath at Sheffield Museum.

== Books Illustrated by Pisa ==
- Rome., Painted by Alberto Pisa, text by M. A. R. Tuker and Hope Malleson. A. and C. Black, London, 1905.
- Pompeii. Painted by Alberto Pisa, and described by William Munro Mackenzie. London, 1910.
- Sicily. Painted by Alberto Pisa, and described by S.C. Musson. London, 1911.
- The Cities of Umbria .With illustrations by A. Pisa, and text by Edward Hutton. New York, Second Edition, 1906. (full access)
- The Cloister and the Hearth, by Charles Reade, with 12 illustrations in color by Alberto Pisa, E. T. Compton. and others.
- The Last Days of Pompeii, by Edward Bulwer-Lytton, with 12 illustrations in color by Alberto Pisa.

== Gallery ==
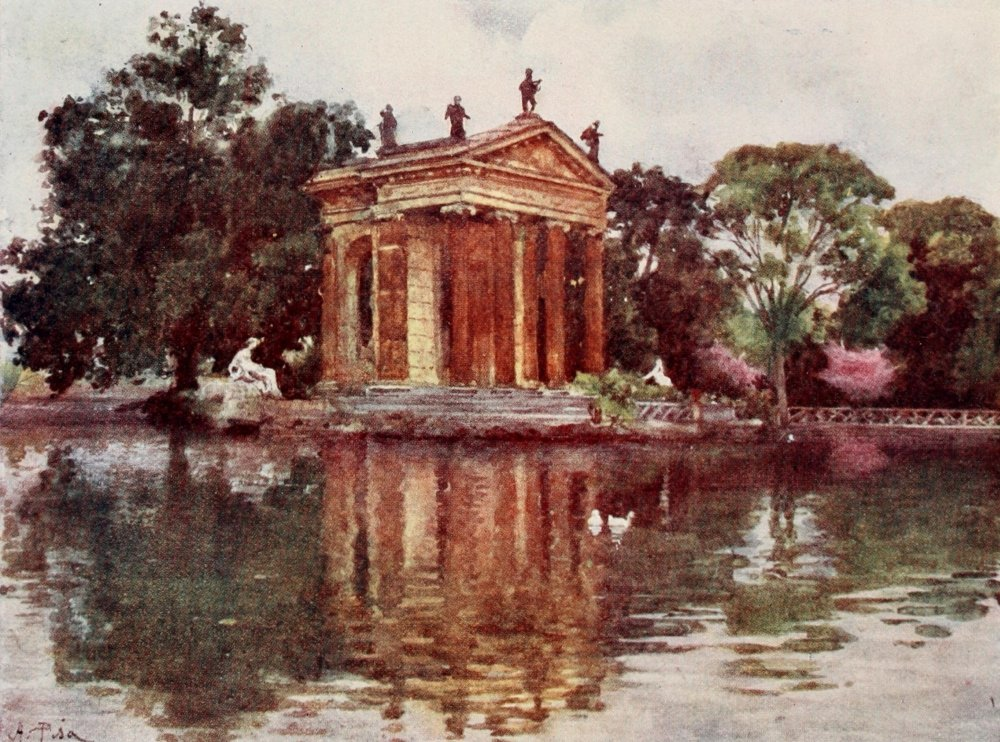
Alberto Pisa – Ornamental pool in Villa Borghese (1905)

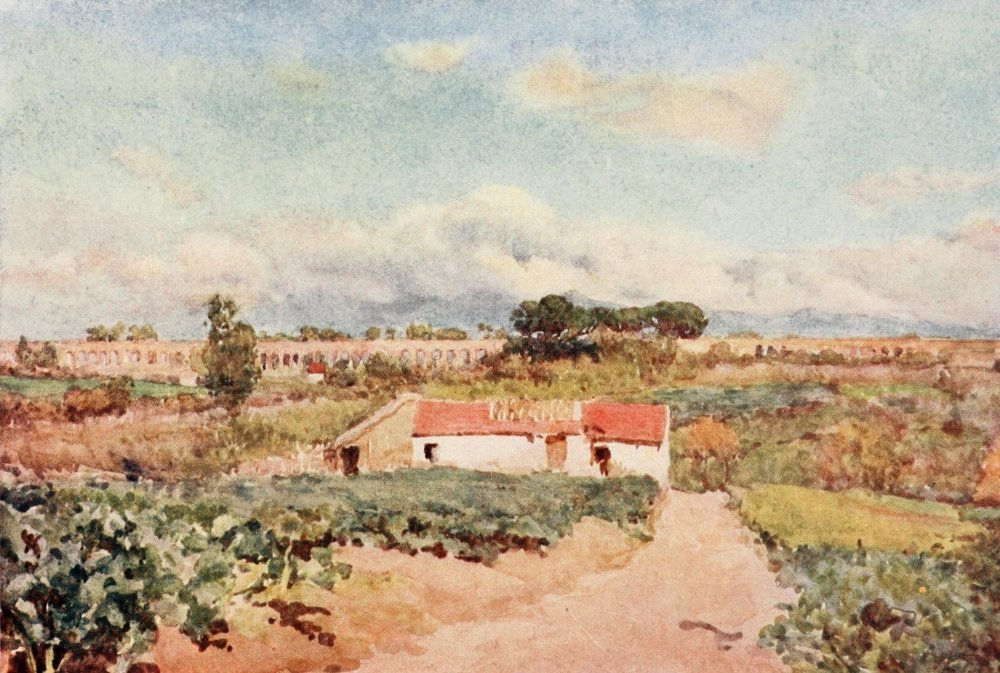
Alberto Pisa – Acqua Claudia (1905)

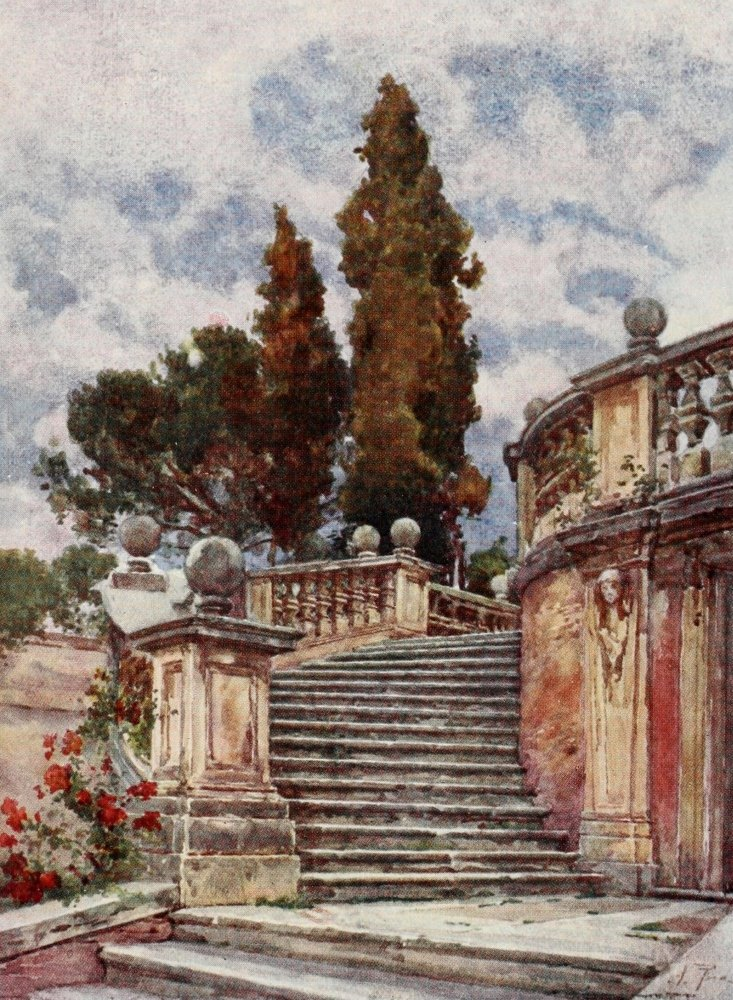
Alberto Pisa – Steps of Church of Santi Domenico e Sisto
