= Giovanni Bartolena =

Italian painter (1886–1942)

Giovanni Bartolena (24 June 1866 – 16 February 1942) was an Italian painter, mainly of landscapes, but also of landscapes with animals.

== Biography ==
He was born near Livorno. As a young man, at his family's villa, he indulged in his love of riding horses. His grandfather, Cesare Bartolena, portrait and battle painter, had been his early mentor. He studied briefly at the Academy of Fine Arts at Florence and attended courses by Giovanni Fattori. He was briefly expelled from the academy, but his grandfather gained his readmittance.

In 1892, he exhibited at the Promotrice di Turin, and in successive years at Florence and Turin. In 1898 he moved to Marseille, then Lucca, then Florence, where he remained until the end of World War I. He met Mario Galli, and traveled with him to Versilia with Galli's friend, the painter Plinio Nomellini.

By 1917–1919, he joined his brother Adolphus in Livorno. There he met the industrialist Querci, and the director of the "Corriere di Livorno", Fabbrini, who will be among his main patrons. In 1925 the textile merchant Cassuto organized Bartolena's first solo exhibition in Milan at the Galleria "L'Esame", displaying landscapes and still lifes. By 1929, Bartolena suspended his contract with Cassuto, but continued to exhibit, including in small galleries including the "Bottega d'Arte" of Livorno; the "Galleria Micheli" of Milan (1929 and 1931); and in 1930 at "Biennale di Venice" (1930). In the mid-thirties, the painter began to gain some commercial success.

Never very successful financially, he was a member of the group of painters frequenting the Caffe Bardi in Livorno. He died in 1942 in Livorno.
