= Tito Lessi =

Italian painter (1858–1917)

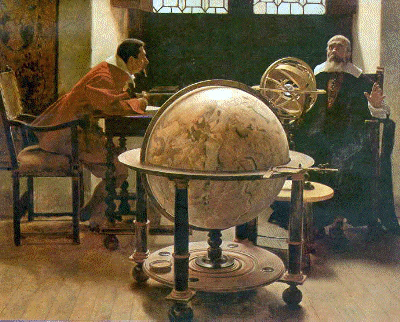
Galileo and Viviani (1892)

Tito Lessi (8 January 1858 – 17 February 1917) was an Italian painter of historical subjects.

== Biography ==
He was born in Florence and studied at the Florentine Academy of Fine Arts, under Enrico Pollastrini and Antonio Ciseri. It was there that he became interested in history paintings, which was considered especially prestigious, due to the difficulties involved in assuring their accuracy.

In 1884, the gallery owner, Charles Sedelmeyer, invited him to Paris, where he painted several small canvases: The Testament; Le lever du Dauphine; L'Interrogatorio (The Interrogation); and Le Lùeur. Some of these were exhibited at the Salon. He remained in Paris until 1896.

While there, in 1893, he created his best known work, showing Galileo's meeting with Vincenzo Viviani. It was awarded a gold medal at the Salon d'Automne and went on to obtain other important awards in Munich and Leipzig. After returning to Florence, he began repeating favorite subjects, often making several copies of each, which were mostly sold in France and Germany.

For the publisher Alinari of Florence, he made a hundred illustrations for their deluxe edition of the Decameron by Giovanni Boccaccio.

He died in Florence in 1917.
