= Enrico Pollastrini =

Italian painter

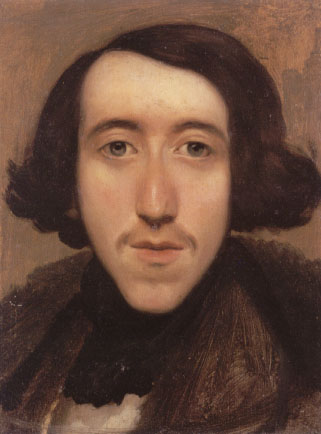
Self-portrait (1833)

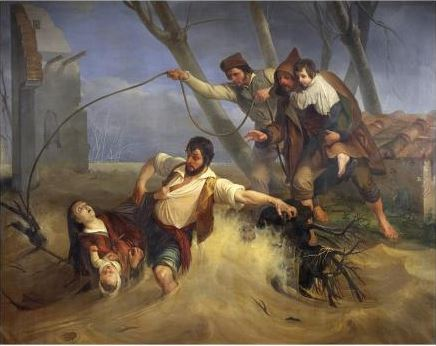
A Family Being Saved from Flooding Along the Serchio

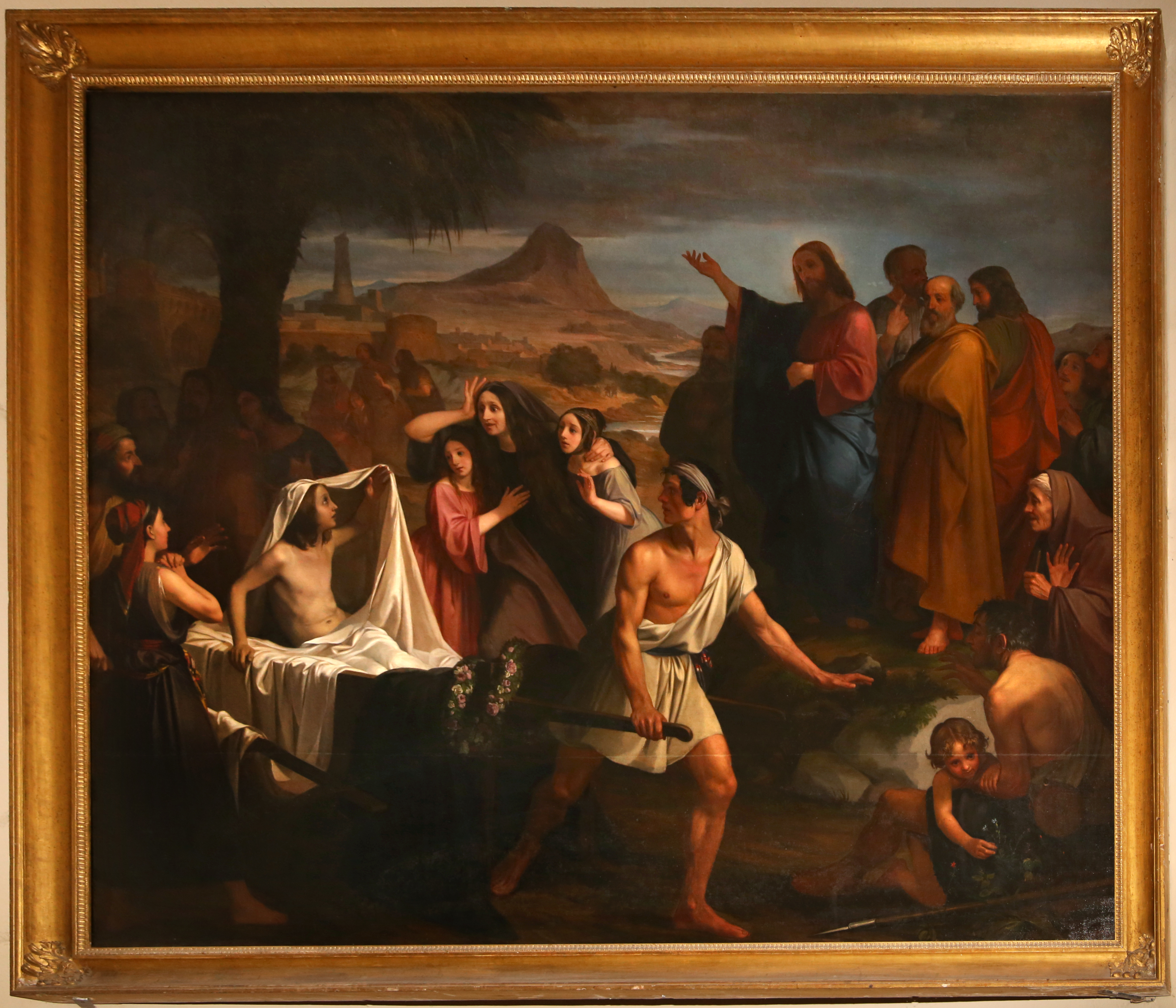
The Miracle of the Resurrection of the Son of the Widow of Nain, 1839

Enrico Pollastrini (15 June 1817 – 19 January 1876) was an Italian history painter and art school director.

== Life and work ==
He was born in Livorno and began his training as an assistant in the workshop of a local artist named Vincenzo De Bonis. In 1829, aged only twelve, he enrolled at the Accademia di Belle Arti di Firenze, where he studied under the guidance of Pietro Benvenuti, Giuseppe Bezzuoli, Giovanni Fattori and Silvestro Lega. From 1835 to 1841, he created thirty-two scenes from The Betrothed; a project commissioned by the French entrepreneur, François de Larderel, to decorate his mansion in Livorno.

In 1837, he held his first exhibition at the Accademia. Four years later, he presented a depiction of Columbus at La Rabida Friary and, in 1843, one depicting the death of Francesco Ferruccio. In 1845, Leopold II, Grand Duke of Tuscany, commissioned him to create a scene showing a family being saved from flooding along the Serchio.

In 1851, he applied for the position of Director at the Accademia di belle arti di Siena, left vacant by the recent death of Francesco Nenci, but Luigi Mussini was chosen instead. Two years later, he was named a Professor at his alma mater, the Accademia. He became a regular participant at the cultural salons in the home of the architect, Francesco Bartolini, and his wife, the Irish-born poet, Louisa Grace Bartolini.

He was elected a member of the Accademia ligustica di belle arti in 1859. The following year, he became a member of the advisory commission for fine arts for the provinces of Arezzo and Florence. His greatest success came in 1861, at the Esposizione nazionale italiana, with "The Exiles of Siena", a painting he worked on from 1842 to 1856. It depicted the fall of the Republic of Siena in 1555, when many of its inhabitants fled after its occupation by Emperor Charles V. It was lost during World War II.

He became Director of the Accademia in 1867 and served until 1875. He died in Florence the following year, after a long illness. His students there included Egisto Ferroni, Francesco Gioli, Tito Lessi, Luigi Bechi, Odoardo Borrani, Cesare Bartolena, Niccolò Cannicci, Vittorio Matteo Corcos, and Stefano Ussi.

== Sources ==
- Bryan, Michael (1889). Walter Armstrong; Robert Edmund Graves (eds.). Dictionary of Painters and Engravers, Biographical and Critical. Vol. II L-Z. London: George Bell and Sons. p. 305.
- Luigi Servolini, Enrico Pollastrini, Livorno, Liburni Civitas, 1928
