= Tommasi =

Tommasi is an Italian surname. Notable people with the surname include:

- Adolfo Tommasi (1851–1933), Italian painter
- Alejandro Tommasi (born 1957), Mexican television, stage and film actor
- Angiolo Tommasi (1858–1923), Italian painter
- Bruno Tommasi (1930–2015), Italian Roman Catholic bishop
- Corrado Tommasi-Crudeli (1834–1900), Italian physician
- Damiano Tommasi (born 1974), former Italian football player, current president of the Italian Footballers' Association
- Giovanni Battista Tommasi (1731–1805), Italian nobleman and 73rd Prince and Grand Master of the Order of Malta
- Giovanni Tommasi Ferroni (born 1967), Italian artist
- Joseph Tommasi (1951–1975), American neo-Nazi
- Joseph Tommasi (communist) (1886–1926), early leader of the French Communist Party
- Ludovico Tommasi (1866–1941), Italian painter
- Ludovik Mifsud Tommasi (1796–1879), Maltese priest and writer
- Luiz Roberto Tommasi, Brazilian zoologist
- Rino Tommasi (1934–2025), Italian journalist, TV host, sport commentator, and boxing organizer
- Rodolfo Tommasi (1907–1993), Italian football player
- Rodolfo Tommasi (journalist) (1946–2015), Italian journalist, writer, musical and literary critic
- Sara Tommasi, Italian former actress and television personality
