= Lorenzo Gelati =

Italian painter (1824–1895)

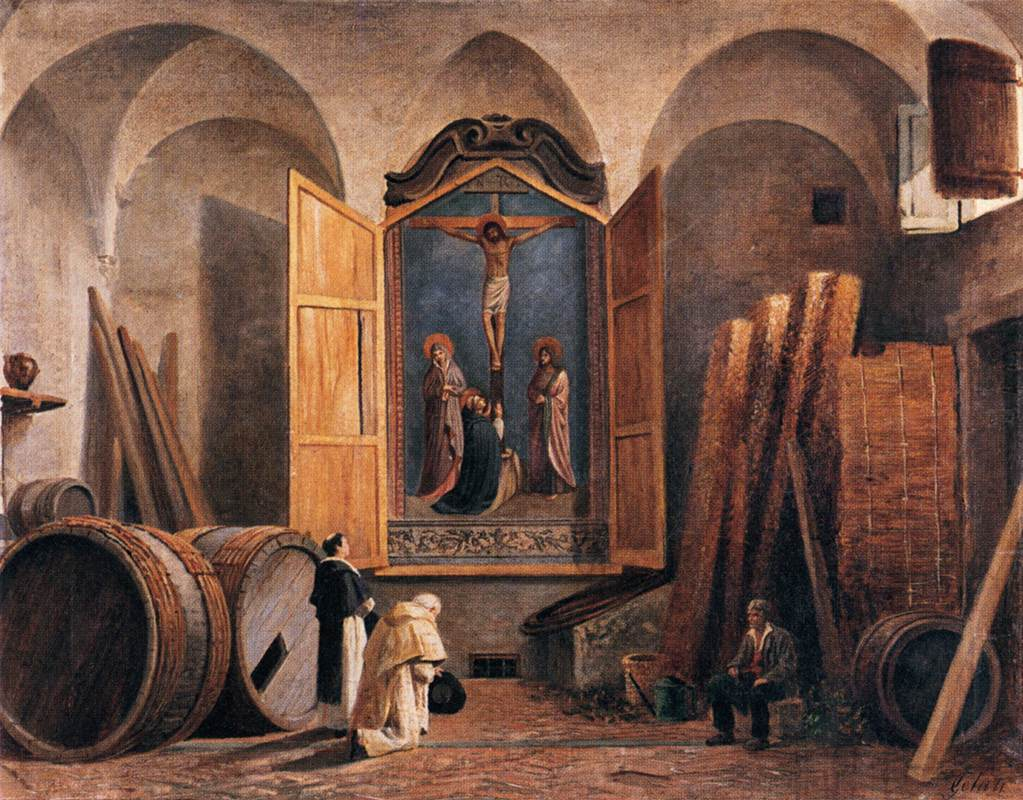
Fra Angelico in the Refectory of San Domenico (ca. 1879)

Lorenzo Gelati (26 January 1824 – 18 May 1895) was an Italian painter, primarily of landscapes.

== Biography ==
Gelati was born in Florence. His father was a sculptor and his mother worked as a seamstress. Abandoning his liberal arts education to begin painting, he studied with Carlo Marco, who had arrived in Florence during the 1830s. Gelati expressed an early interest in landscapes and genre scenes. His first exhibition was in 1847. He remained a frequent and enthusiastic exhibitor throughout his life.

He briefly participated in the activities of the Scuola di Staggia, a group devoted to painting realistic landscapes in plein aire, which included his teacher's sons Carlo Marco, the Younger and Andrea Marco. He also frequented the Caffè Michelangiolo, where he came into contact with the Macchiaioli. Although he never joined their movement, he was in accord with their use of color as it related to areas of light and shadow.

Gelati died in Florence in 1895. The scope of his work was often not appreciated as, after his death, many of his paintings—apparently unsigned—were attributed to artists such as Giuseppe Abbati, Raffaello Sernesi and Odoardo Borrani. The current locations of many of the works he sold in exhibition are not known.
