= Pagni =

Pagni is an Italian surname. Notable people with the surname include:

- Benedetto Pagni (died 1578), Italian Mannerist painter
- Eros Pagni (born 1939), Italian actor
- Ferruccio Pagni (1866–1935), French-Italian painter
- Sergio Pagni (born 1979), Italian archer
