= Anna Luisa Pignatelli =

Italian novelist

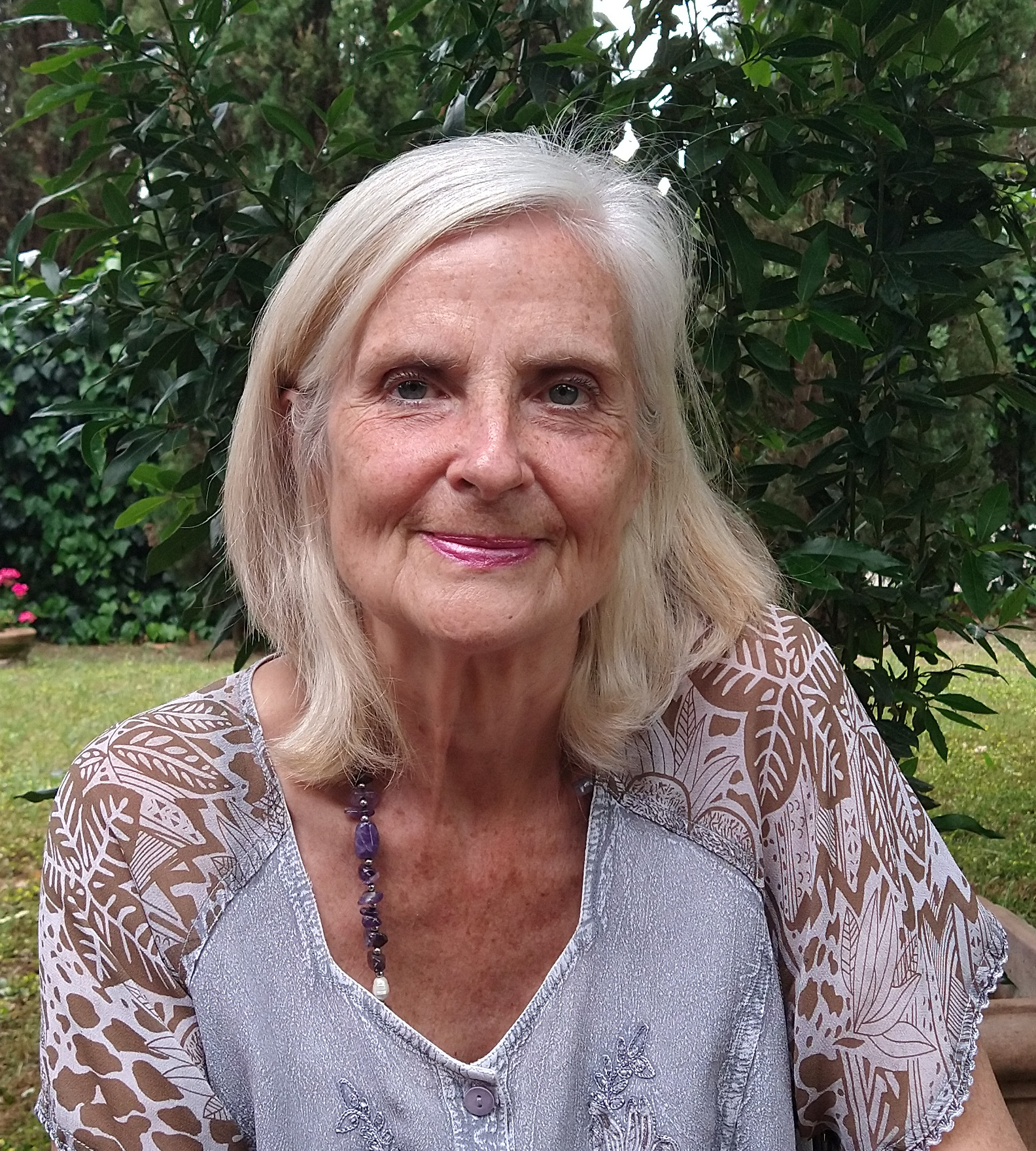
Anna Luisa Pignatelli

Anna Luisa Pignatelli della Leonessa dei Principi di Monteroduni (born 22 November 1952 in Asciano, Siena) is an Italian novelist and an aristocrat of German ancestry.

== Biography ==
Princess Anna Luisa Ermanna Pia Cecilia was born in Tuscany as the only daughter of Prince Wolf Georg Alfred of Schönburg-Waldenburg (1902-1983) and his wife, Countess Luciana Bargagli-Stoffi (1921-1984). She studied in Siena and graduated in Florence in Political Science. Married to a diplomat, Don Fabrizio Pignatelli della Leonessa dei Principi di Monteroduni (b. 1952), she has lived many years abroad, particular in South Korea, Tanzania, Portugal and for long periods in Guatemala where she played a significant role in the cultural life of the Italian community, has contributed with several articles to the local newspaper La Gazzetta and has organized cultural activities.

== Writings ==
In 1989 she started her writing production with a book dedicated to Guatemalan ethnic groups of Mayan descent, showing a strong interest in the culture of the local communities. Her maternal Tuscan roots emerge in the following novels L’ultimo feudo (2002), Buio (2006), Nero Toscano (2012) and Ruggine (2016), Foschia (2019), where the dominant themes are the attachment to the land and the ancestral values of her characters. The political and social situation of Guatemala is the main theme in the novel Le lac indigène (2012).

Her books are used in Italian literature and language courses at the Franklin & Marshall College of Lancaster (USA).

== Criticism ==
Antonio Tabucchi has judged her voice as unusual, lyrical, sharp, and desolate in the contemporary Italian literature, Rodolfo Tommasi has defined L’ultimo feudo as a masterpiece in contemporary fiction. About Nero Toscano (Noir Toscan) Elias Khoury wrote "It is a very beautiful book, a book of tenderness, written in a new perspective, in a language both dense and gentle. It establishes a magical relation with nature. This kind of relationship has always been essential in literature all over the world". Filippo La Porta ranked second her work Ruggine in the 2016 book list and in Il Sole 24 ore he writes that "the art of being far from one's own time is what makes a text close to being a classic. This is the case of Ruggine". On Nero Toscano, Vincenzo Consolo writes: "This story of a southern farmer who settled in the tuscan countryside and fights alone for the preservation of nature, is an example of what everyone should do in defence of the environment and of the values we should all fight for". The french edition of the same novel, Noir Toscan, was presented by Vasco Graça Moura at the Foundation Gulbenkian in Paris in 2011. Her novels have been reviewed in numerous Italian and French newspapers and magazines: La Stampa, 23 Jan. 2016, Il Sole 24 ore, 7 Febbr. 2016, Corriere della Sera, 31 Jan. 2016, La Quinzaine littéraire, Oct. 2009, Le Monde, 31 Oct. 2009, Le Figaro littéraire, 19 Nov. 2009, Les Temps, 9 Dec. 2009, LaLibre.be, 4 Jan.2010, El Periodico, 19 Dec. 2014, Jornal de Letras, Artes e Ideias, 6 Apr. 2014, la Repubblica, 3 March 2019.

== Translations ==
Pignatelli is well known in France where La Differénce in 2009 published two of her books: Le dernier fief and Noir Toscan and made a new edition of Les grands enfants, already published in 2001 by Harmattan. Also in 2009 she was finalised for the section Foreign books of the Femina Prize with her novel Noir Toscan and in 2010 she won the Prix des lecteurs du Var with the same novel. In Guatemala, El lago indigena came out in Spanish in 2016, originally published in 2012 in France by La Différence, a novel in which, through the story of a photographer, the writer denounces the massacres of civilians and indigenous communities committed by the Guatemalan army in the 1980s.

== Awards ==
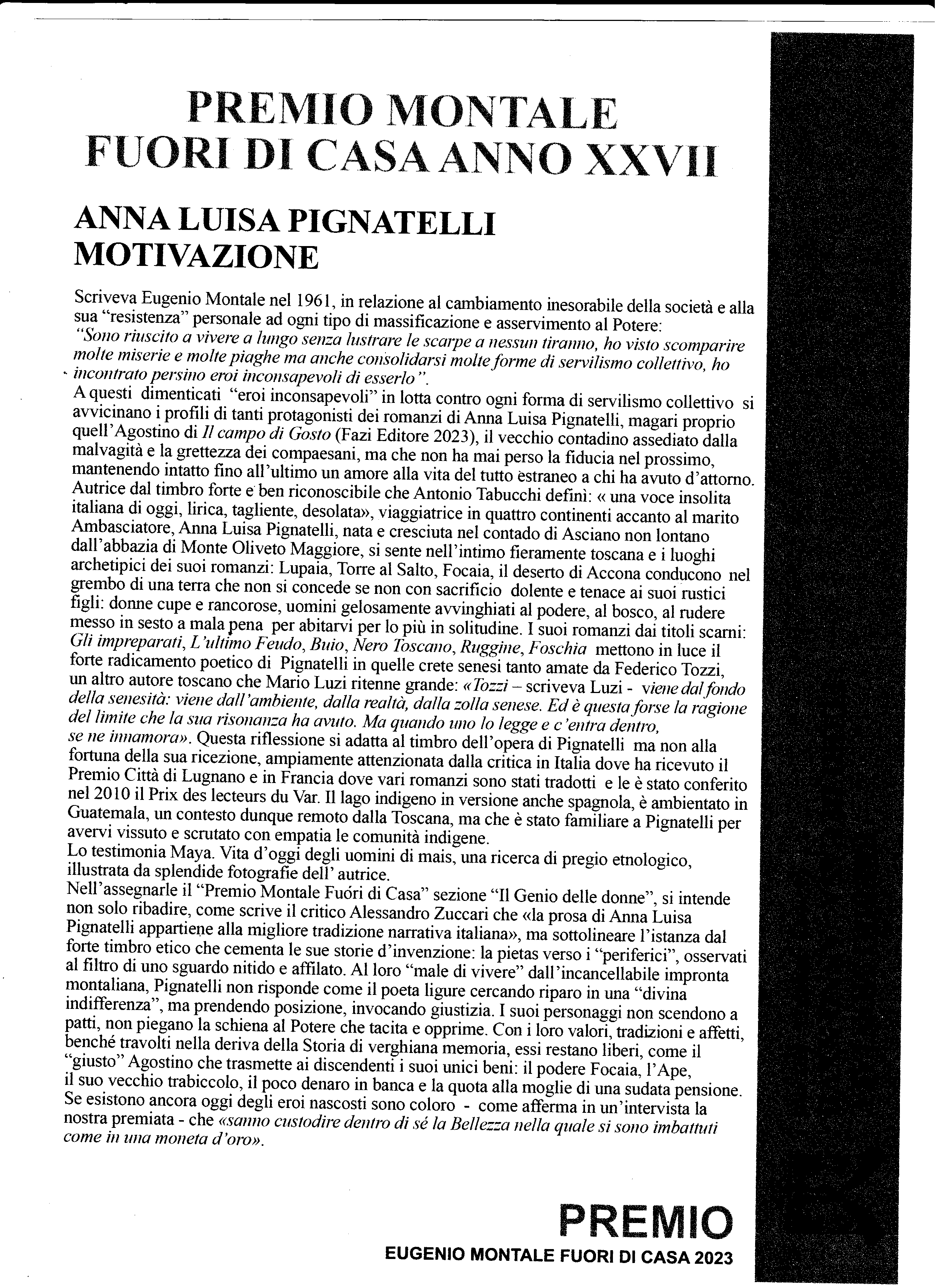
- Prime Montale motivation
  Prize Montale Fuori di Casa for the whole of his work, Florence, Gabinet Viesseux, October 2023
- Prize Città di Lugnano for Ruggine, Lugnano in Teverina, July 2016
- Prix des lecteurs du Var for Noir Toscan, Toulon, October 2010
- Prize Fiorino d'argento for L'ultimo feudo, Florence, November 2002

== Works ==
- Maya. Vita d'oggi degli uomini di mais, Firenze: Nardini press, 1989, ISBN 978 8840490007. 1. rist. 1991, 2.rist. 1996
- Gli impreparati, Paisan di Prato, Campanotto, 1996.,
  - French translation Les grands enfants 1°. ed Paris; Budapest; Torino : l'Harmattan, 2001,ISBN 2-7475-1836-1, 2°. ed. Paris : la Différence, 2009, ISBN 978-2-7291-1839-6
- L'ultimo feudo, Faenza: MobyDick, 2002, ISBN 88-8178-208-1.,
  - French translation Le dernier fief with the publisher La Différence, 2009 ISBN 978-2-7291-1838-9.
- Buio, Bologna: Pendragron, 2006, ISBN 88-8342-485-9 Pignatelli, Anna Luisa (2006). Buio. Edizioni Pendragon. ISBN 9788883424854.
  - French translation Noir toscan, La Difference, 2009, ISBN 978-2-7291-1837-2
- Nero toscano, Lantana, 2012, ISBN 978-88-97012-51-1.
- Le lac indigène, withafterword by Dante Liano, Paris: La Différence, 2012, ISBN 978-2-7291-1978-2. Spanish ed., Guatemala Sophos, 2016, ISBN 9789929812741
- Ruggine, Roma: Fazi, 2016, ISBN 978-88-7625-828-2
- Foschia, Roma, Fazi, 2019, ISBN 9788893254762.Pignatelli, Anna Luisa (24 January 2019). Foschia. Fazi Editore. ISBN 9788893255387.
- Il campo di Gosto, Roma, Fazzi, 2023, ISBN 9791259673213
- Le crabe royal, Aix en Provance, Decrescenzo 2025, ISBN 978-2-36727-145-3

== Bibliography ==
- Clara Ranghetti (2016). "Recensione di Ruggine, di Anna Luisa Pignatelli". Misure Critiche. XV (1–2): 452–455.
