= Luigi Trinchero =

Argentinian artist

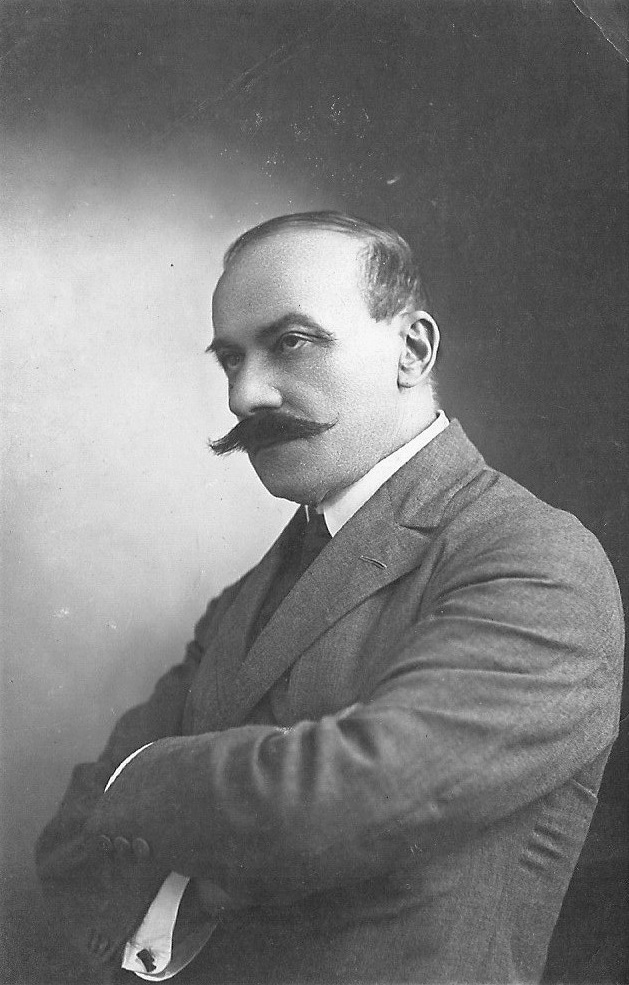
- Luigi Trinchero circa 1900
- Born: June 9, 1862; Acqui Terme
- Died: February 6, 1944 (aged 81); Buenos Aires, Argentina
- Notable work: Bas-reliefs and busts on the facade of the Teatro Colón

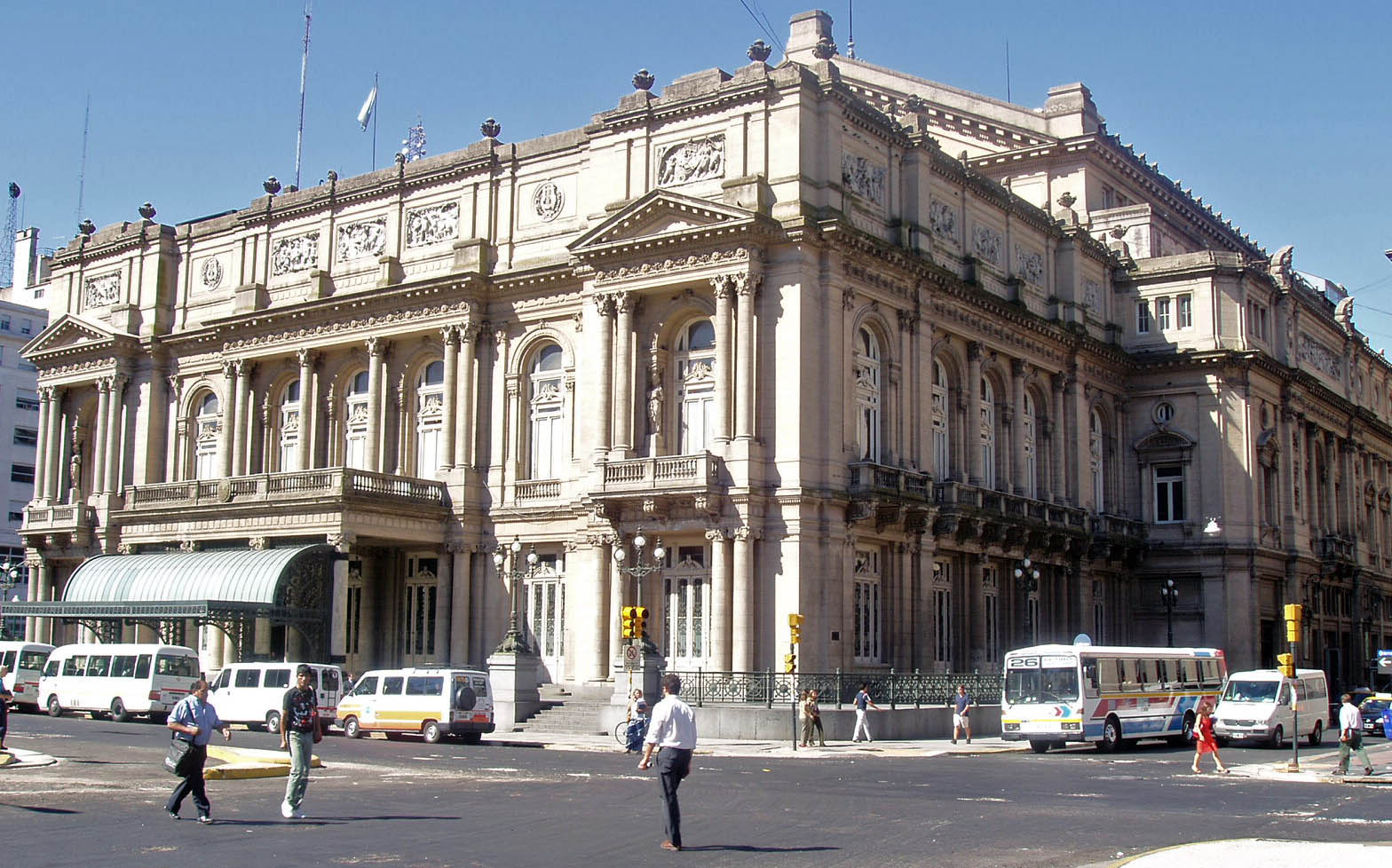
Teatro Colón

Luigi Trinchero (June 9, 1862 in Acqui Terme – February 6, 1944 in Buenos Aires, Argentina) was an Italian sculptor, most active in Argentina after 1888, most notably the bas-reliefs and busts on the facade of the Teatro Colón.

== Biography ==
Born in Acqui (a commune of the Province of Alessandria, Piedmont), at six years old traveled with his parents to Savona, where he attended elementary grades and technicians, completed in 1876 with high marks, particularly in the arts. The next year he served in a decorative arts studio in Turin, while also attending classes at the Albertina Academy, where he earned gold and silver medals for his skills as ornamentist.

On 1882, he moved to France, where he specialized in ceramics. On his return to Italy, presented some works in the exhibition held in Turin, which drew effusive praise of Umberto I and the Queen, Margherita of Savoy. The appointment as artistic director in a ceramic factory in Faenza enabled him to achieve further success. His artwork and statuary was awarded both in the city and in Milan and Venice.

From 1887 to 1888 remained in Florencia, running a workshop designed to serve the trade. The same year, Luigi Trinchero embarked to Argentina, invited by the sculptor Victor de Pol and the painter Luis de Servi to run a ceramics factory in the city of La Plata founded by these artists, strongly linked to the progress of Argentine art.

Trinchero then moved to Buenos Aires, where, encouraged by the Marquis Carlos Morra, opened a workshop on ornamental sculpture, from where, in Argentina flourishing of the first decades of the twentieth century, was devoted to ornament many public and private buildings. Examples of outbound work for the Museo y Centro Naval and the Sociedad Italiana Unione e Benevolenza, the facade of the Templo de la Piedad, external image of Stella Maris (in the church of the same name in Mar del Plata), Government House (provinces Santa Fe and Jujuy), La Prensa newspaper, banks, schools, etc.

His most outstanding work, however, was born when he is hired by the Intendencia de la Ciudad de Buenos Aires, with the company and Amellini Pellizari, to perform all indoor and outdoor sculptures at the Teatro Colón in Buenos Aires. Moreover, he made the monuments to General Martin Rodriguez (in the namesake city); Doctor Nicanor Basavilbaso (Avellaneda), the artistic mausoleum of the family Madariaga (San Nicolás); tombs for the Roverano and Bettinelli families (Cemetery of Chacarita), Antonio Riva and Dolphin Gallo (in the cemetery of Recoleta), and others; as well as many statues and busts commissioned by major families in Buenos Aires.

Since 1916 serves as a professor at the National College drawing Manuel Belgrano. The location of their workshops between 1890 and 1944, all in Buenos Aires, were Sarandí 1417, Juncal 1306, Cochabamba 2718, Viamonte 1164 and México 672.

In 1921 is appointed director of a sculpture workshop in the service of the commune of Buenos Aires. In 1928, and 29 attended the presentations community of Buenos Aires and Latin American of Seville, which reached silver medals and diplomas for his sculptures, including Un mal rato bajo la lluvia(A bad time in the rain) and Inocencia (Innocence).

The economic crisis in 1930 and the associated political changes ended the rapid development of Buenos Aires and the Argentine Republic. Trinchero, like many other European artists settled in the country, was not immune. However, his creative spirit was recorded in countless sketches of sources and projects with ornaments. He died in Buenos Aires on February 6, 1944.

Trinchero stood among the visual artists and foreign nationals who left their mark during the flowering of Buenos Aires. Abundant exchange of letters, pictures, photographs and projects devoted to each other, showed the affectionate ties and respect that existed between them. In addition to the artists mentioned above, can be added to his personal circle of friends Benito Quinquela Martin painter and muralist Francisco Paolo Parisi.

== Work ==
Some of his numerous works include:

- Teatro Colón: Four caryatids argue that the balconies on the front side of the building, on Calle Lavalle, the busts of Mozart, Bellini, Bizet, Beethoven. Gounod, Rossini, Verdi and Wagner, the crowning of the boxes "avant-scene, all low and high reliefs that decorate the interior and exterior of the theater, Buenos Aires, Argentina.
- Lying Christ. Frontispicio Church of La Piedad, Capital City, Buenos Aires.
- Bustos Dante and Leonardo da Vinci. Done for the Company and Benevolenza Unione. Sarmiento street 1368.
- A bad time in the rain. Bronze for ornamental fountain. Private collection.
- Monument to Martin Rodriguez. In the eponymous town of the province of Buenos Aires.
- Busts of Alvear and the President Hipólito Irigoyen: Location unknown.
- Sculptures of the facade and main gate of the Centro Naval Building. Between Florida and Córdoba's streets, Buenos Aires.

== Bibliography ==
- Trinchero, M. del C., & Trinchero, G. D.. (2021). Luigi Trinchero: El escultor del Teatro Colón (1.^{a} ed.). Maizal Ediciones. ISBN 9789878496016.
- Sergi, Jorge F.. Historia de los Italianos en la Argentina, pág. 481. Editorial Ítalo-argentina S.A., 1940, Bs As, Argentina.
- Petriella, Dionisio; Sosa Miatello, Sara, Diccionario Biográfico Italo-Argentino. Dante Alighieri Association, Bs As, 1976. ISBN 9789509089853.
- Caamaño, R, La Historia del Teatro Colón 1908-1968, Cinetea, 1969, page 39.
- References and photographic records of their direct descendants.
