= Antal Ligeti =

Hungarian landscape painter

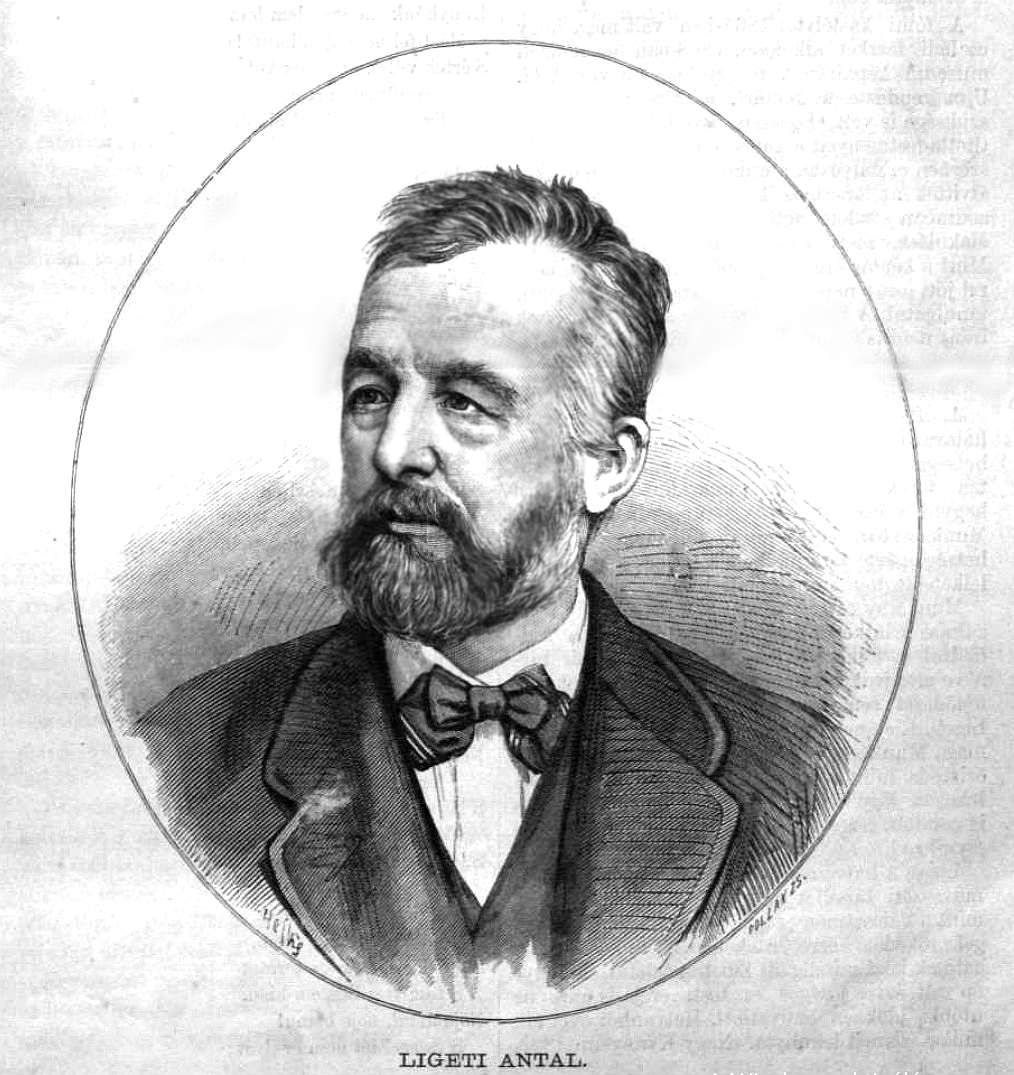
- Antal Ligeti; portrait by Zsigmond Pollák (1883)
- Born: Antal Hekler; 10 January 1823; Nagykároly, Hungary
- Died: 5 January 1890 (aged 66); Budapest
- Education: Károly Markó in Florence
- Known for: Landscapes, genre scenes
- Style: Landscapes, Orientalist themes

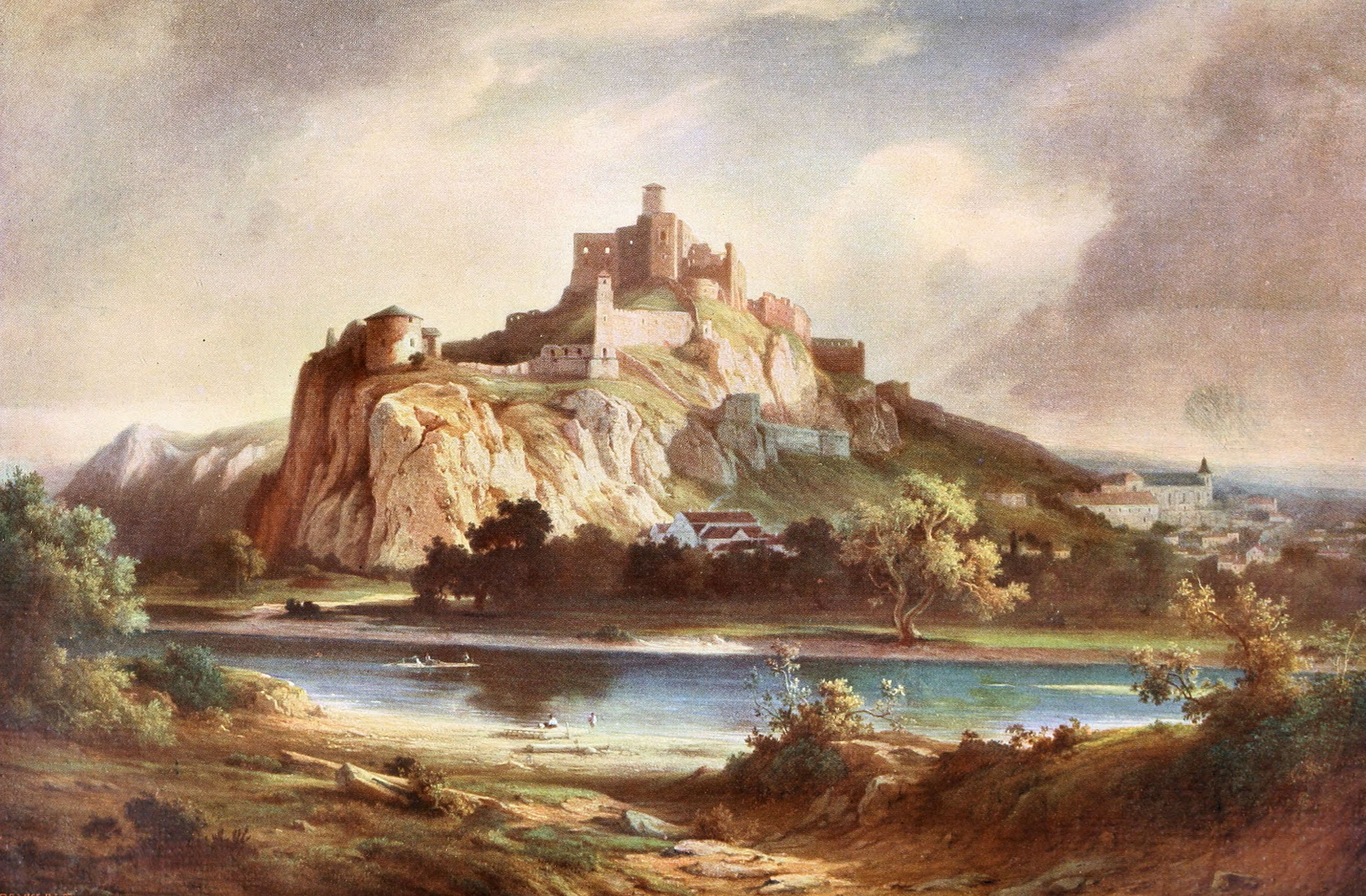
Trencsény Castle (date unknown)

Antal Ligeti (10 January 1823, Nagykároly - 5 January 1890, Budapest) was a Hungarian landscape painter.

== Biography ==
Born Antal Hekler, he was expected to follow in the family's footsteps and become a merchant, but he was so intent on being an artist that he abandoned the comforts of home and went to Italy. He travelled through Naples and spent some time in Florence, where he came under the tutelage of his fellow countryman Károly Markó.

He spent a short time in Munich and, upon returning to his homeland in 1848, briefly fought in the Hungarian Revolution. Two years later, he settled in Sopron and attempted to earn a living by painting portraits. Failing that, he moved to Pest, where he met and obtained the patronage of Count István Károlyi, who allowed him to stay at his palace in Fót. In 1855, with the Count's financial support, he travelled extensively; visiting Egypt, Palestine, Syria, Cyprus and Malta and returning with a huge portfolio of sketches, some of which he used as the subjects for paintings.

These works proved to be highly successful and, by 1861, he was able to establish his own home and studio in Pest. Seven years later, he was appointed curator of the art gallery at the Hungarian National Museum. He later served as a mentor to Mihály Munkácsy and Géza Mészöly.

== Work ==
Legeti worked primarily in oils. His work covers landscapes, Orientalist themes and portraits.

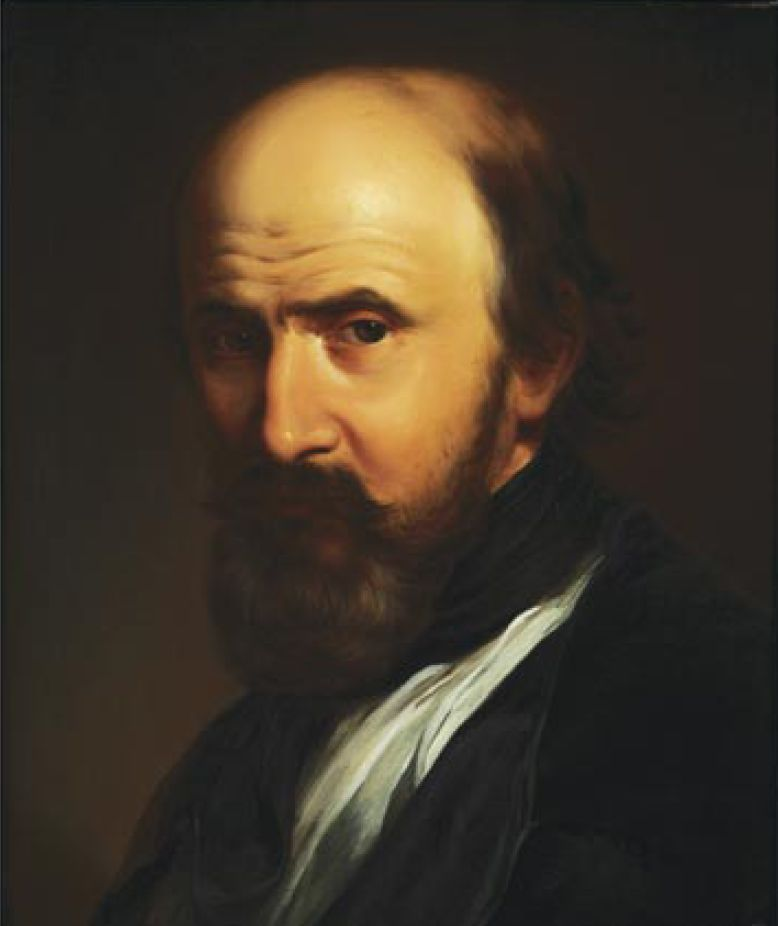
Portrait of Károly Markó, 1847

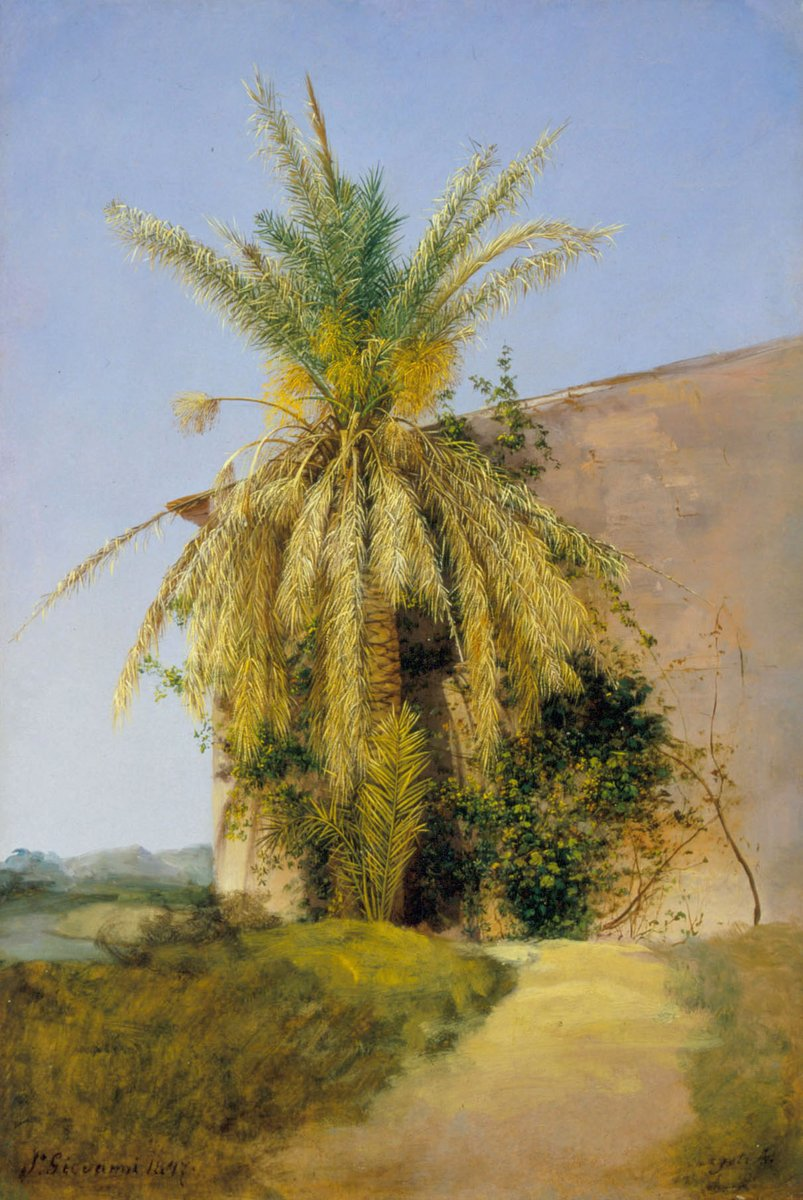
Pálma, 1847

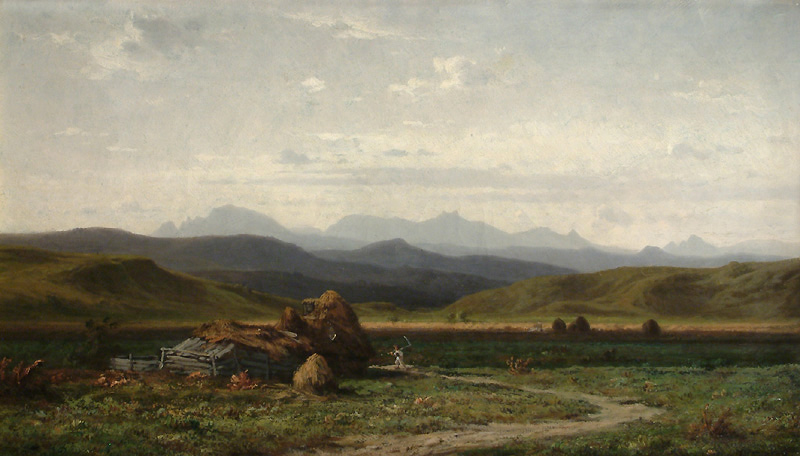
Herdsman's Hut, c. 1870

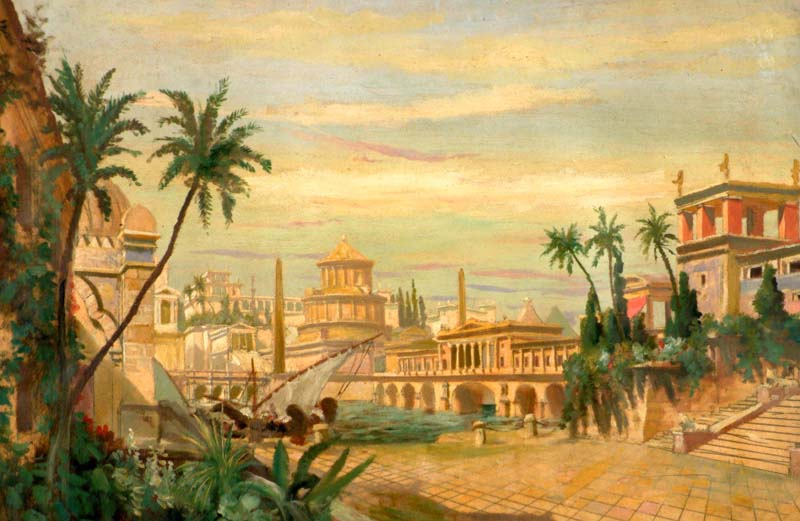
Seaside Town, 1886

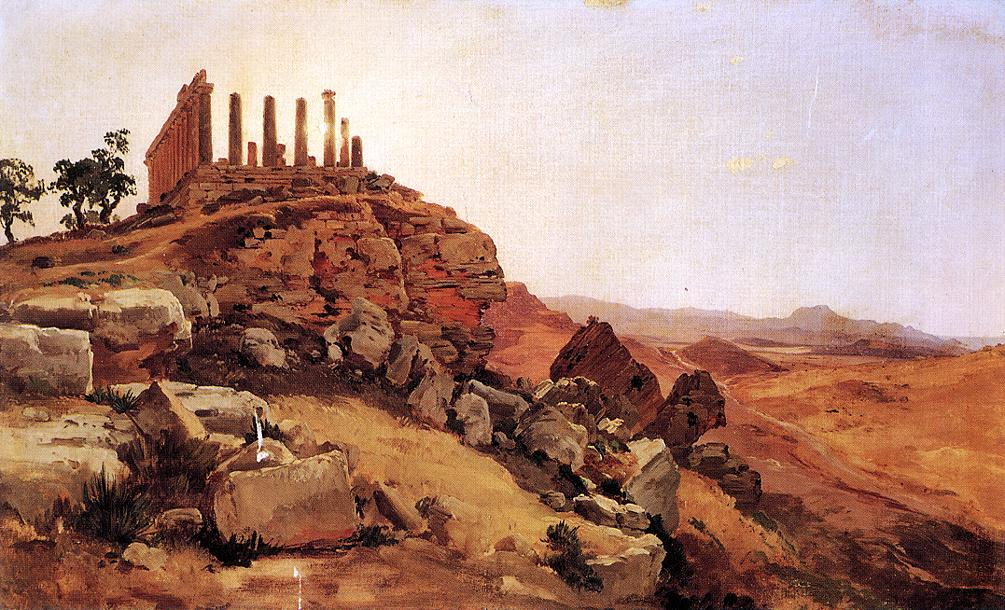
Greek Temple, date unknown

== See also ==
- List of Orientalist artists
- Orientalism
