= András Markó =

Italian painter (1824–1895)

András or Andrea Markó (1824–1895) was a Hungarian-Italian painter, mainly of landscapes. Like his brother, the more famous landscape painter Károly Markó the Younger (Carlo Marko), he was active in Florence, Italy.

== Biography ==
He was born in Vienna. Like his brothers Károly and Ferenc, he was initially apprenticed with his father, Károly Markó the Elder. Andrea is said to have also studied with Carl Rahl at the Vienna Academy of Fine Arts.

Andrea was prolific, painting landscapes in oil of diverse parts of Europe, though mostly Italy and Russia. His paintings often have earthy coloration and depict expanses of landscape with minuscule figures or animals.

The works of Andrea, his brother Carlo, and Serafino De Tivoli depicting the rural landscapes around Siena, in a Macchiaioli style, gave impetus to the Scuola di Staggia, that also loosely included painters such as Emilio Donnini (1809-1896), Carlo Ademollo, Lorenzo Gelati, Francesco Saverio Altamura, and Alessandro La Volpe.

Among his works: I cavallari maremmani, awarded a prize at the Exhibition of Florence del 1860; Veduta delle Cave di Carrara, awarded a medal at the International Exposition of Vienna in 1873; Paese alpestre; Una vallata; Una carovana di Samoyedi; Boscaglia; Una nevicata in Russia; Le rovine di Taormina; Paesaggi italiani. Many of these were sold in the Americas. He was named professor of the Academies of Florence, Urbino, Milan e of the Società degli acquarellisti di Brussels. He died in 1895 in Palaia.

== Selected paintings ==
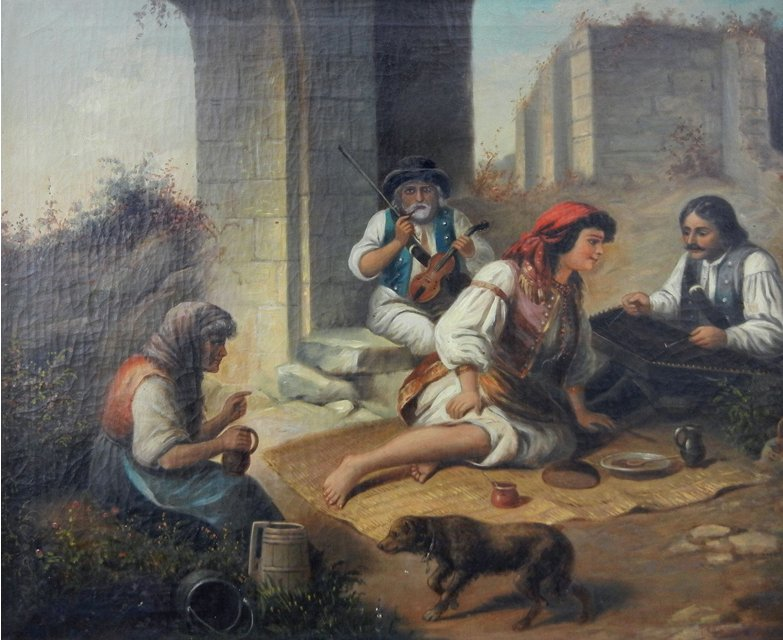
Landscape with Gypsies

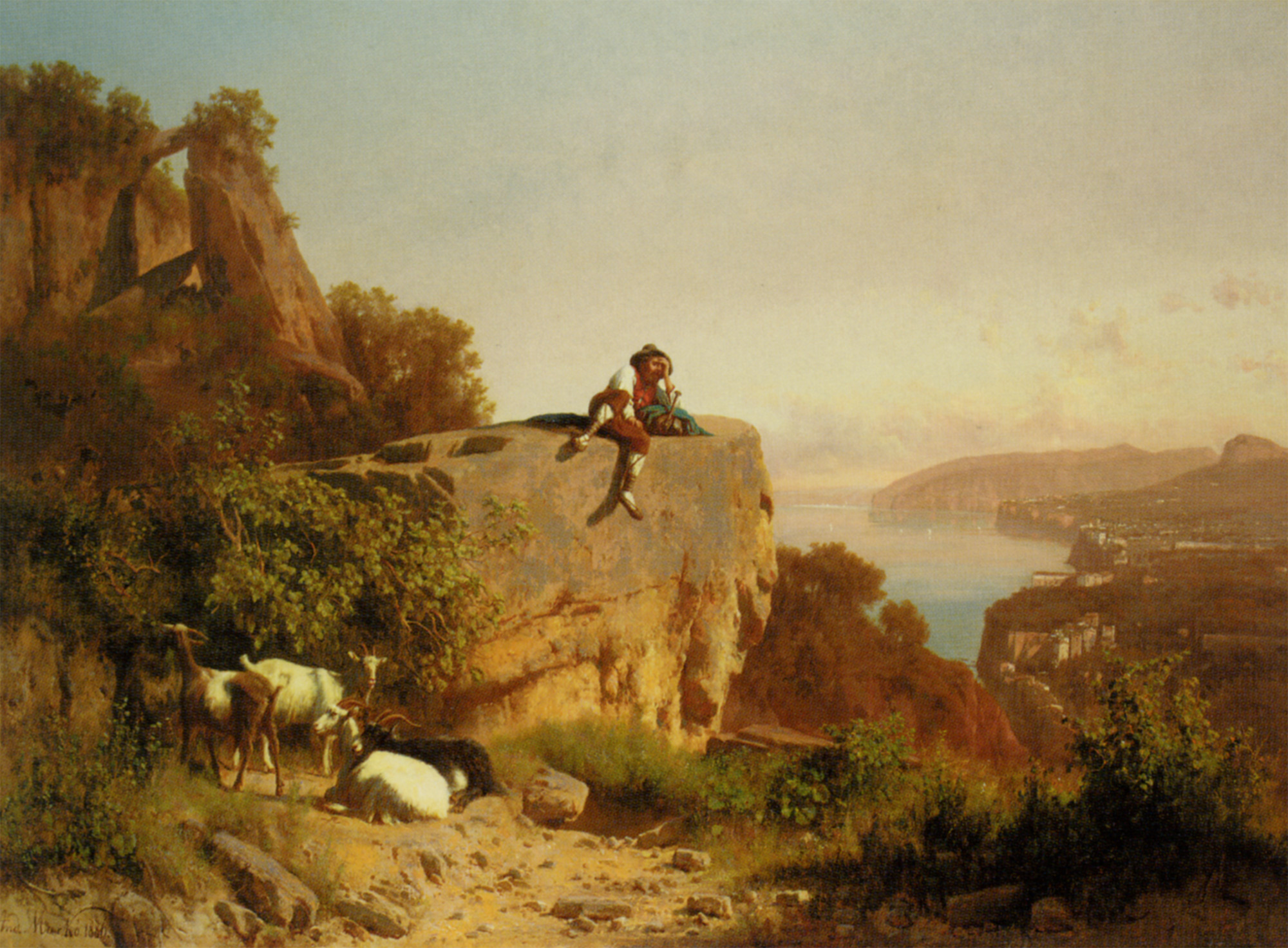
Surveying the Vista

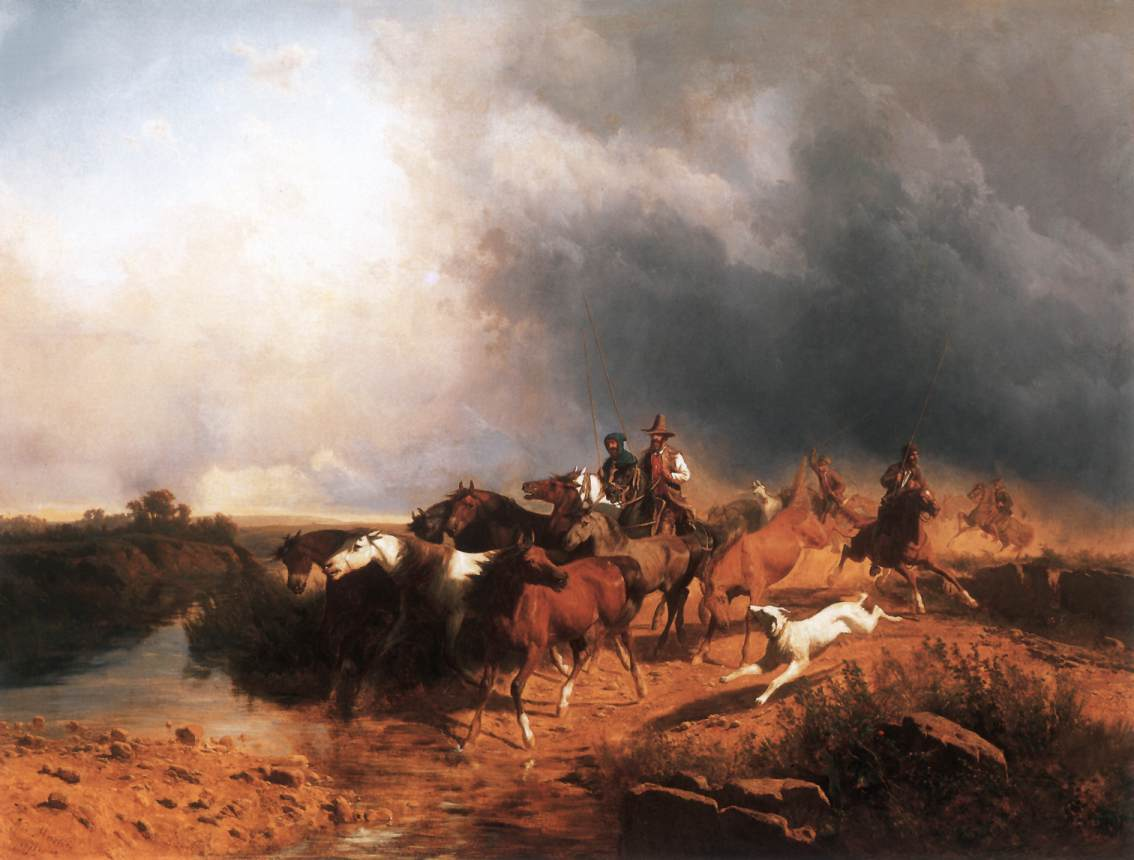
Landscape with Galloping Horses

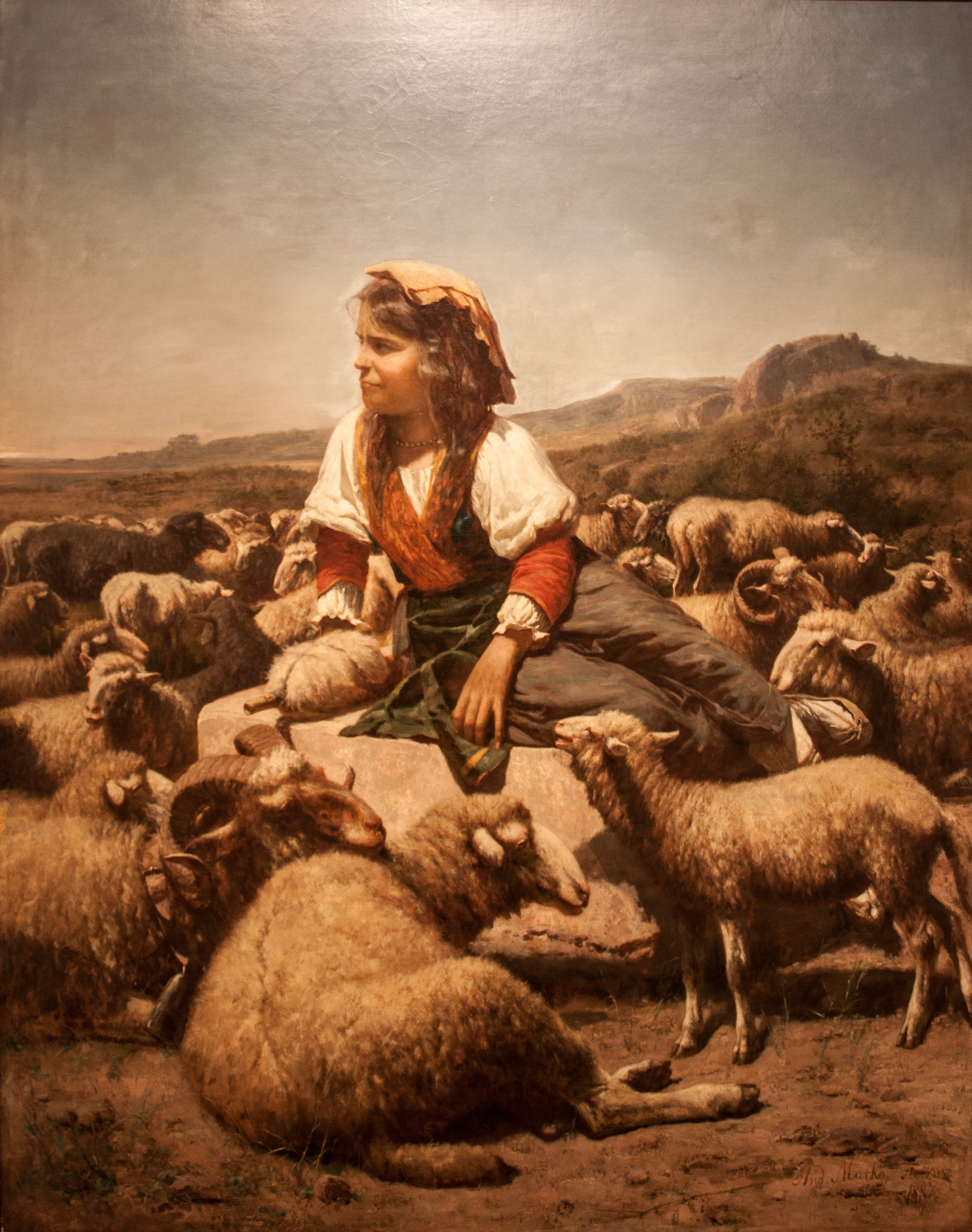
Shepherd Girl
