= Vincenzo Consolo =

Italian writer (1933–2012)

Vincenzo Consolo (18 February 1933 – 21 January 2012) was an Italian writer.

Consolo was born in Sant'Agata di Militello but resided in Milan from 1969 until his death. He began his literary career in 1963, but gained wider attention in 1976 with Il sorriso dell’ignoto marinaio (The Smile of the Unknown Mariner) and went on to become an award-winning author.

In 2008 he was in Lisbon for a conference at Istituto Italiano di Cultura, where he met with the Portuguese poet Casimiro de Brito and Anna Luisa Pignatelli and wrote a comment on her novel "Nero Toscano".

Vincenzo Consolo won the Strega Prize with Nottetempo Casa per Casa (At night, from house to house) concerning 1920s Sicily and the rise of fascism. He also been given an honorary doctorate by the University of Palermo. In 1994 he was awarded with the Premio Internazionale Unione Latina.

He died in Milan in 2012 after a long illness.

== Awards ==
- 1985 – Pirandello Award, with Lunaria.
- 1988 – Grinzane Cavour Prize, with Retablo.
- 1992 – Strega Prize, with Nottetempo, casa per casa.
- 1994 – International Latin Union Prize, with L'olivo e l'olivastro.
- 1999 – Brancati Prize, with Lo spasimo di Palermo.
- 1999 – Flaiano Prize.
- 2000 – Feronia-Città di Fiano Prize, with Di qua dal faro.
- 2011 – Ostana Prize - Scritture in lingua madre, Special Prize
