= Ferruccio Pagni =

Italian painter

Ferrucio Pagni (11 September 1866 – 20 November 1935) was a French-Italian painter active mainly painting sacred subjects in a late-Mannerist style in Siena, Tuscany, Italy.

== Biography ==
He was born in Livorno, and studied from 1879 to 1886 at the Scuola Comunale di Disegno Figurativo of that city under di Natale Betti. Among his fellow students were Plinio Nomellini and Angiolo Tommasi. he acquired a stipend to study at the Academy of Fine Arts of Florence. In 1892, he enrolled in the Scuola Libera del Nudo taught by Giovanni Fattori. He begins to meet with other artists, including Francesco Fanelli, Giorgio Kienerk, the brothers Tommasi, and Nomellini at the Trattoria del Volturno. He participates at the Promotrice fiorentina in 1887, 1888, 1889, and 1890–91. Like his colleagues, he graduated from a Macchiaioli style to a Divisionist style. In 1892, he moves to Torre del Lago, where he was joined by his friend Giacomo Puccini.

Along with Nomellini, Tommasi, Fanelli, and Raffaello Gambogi they founded the Club of the Bohemian Circle. THis group would later be joined by Amedeo Lori, Lorenzo Viani, and Galileo Chini.

He exhibited widely in the 1890s, in Viareggio, Brera, at the I Esposizione Triennale d’Arte of Turin, at the 1896-97 alla Festa dell’Arte e dei Fiori in Florence, in the 1897 III Triennial of Milan, in the 1897–98 and 1899–1900 exhibitions of the Società di Belle Arti fiorentina, and in 1898 at Turin. He painted along with Nomellini and Luigi De Servi, frescoes for the piano salon of the villa di Puccini at Torre del Lago, now sold away. In 1901 and 1902 he was elected consigliere comunale for Viareggio.

In 1904, he travels to Rosario di Santa Fe in Argentina, where he establishes an art academy. He travels to Buenos Aires and Santiago in Chile to paint. at the end of World War I, he returns to Torre del Lago.

In 1919, he was a cofounder of the Club Gianni Schicchi di Viareggio, instituted in honor of Puccini, and becomes a member of the academy degli Zeteti, started by the writer Enrico Pea and including the painter Moses Levy. In 1925, he has a personal exhibit along with Giovanni Lomi at the Bottega d’Arte di Livorno. In 1932 he exhibited at the Casa d’arte of La Spezia. he died in Torre del Lago.

Some of his works are visible at the Villa Museo Giacomo Puccini of Torre del Lago and the Museo Civico Giovanni Fattori of Livorno.
