= Marco Lemmi =

Italian photographer and painter

Marco Lemmi (February 26, 1834 – 1900) was an Italian photographer and painter, in the latter, mainly of landscapes.

He was born in Livorno and studied under the painter Natale Betti. For some time, he worked in a business, the casa Giamari. He then moved to Florence, where he studied under Antonio Puccinelli, and helped complete an altarpiece of Sant'Isidoro, for a church of Sardinia. In 1863, he returned to Livorno painting mainly landscapes and portraits including General Robaudi, Marchese Spinola, and Admiral Chrotien, President of the Republic of Uruguay. He painted Rest after the Hunt for King Vittorio Emanuele and La padula for Count cavalliere Tommasi. Veduta of San Rossore after the rain was bought by the Niemarck, and he painted some works for the King of Spain, Amedeo of Savoy, who awarded him with the order of the knights of Isabel the Catholic.
