= Angiolo Tommasi =

Italian painter

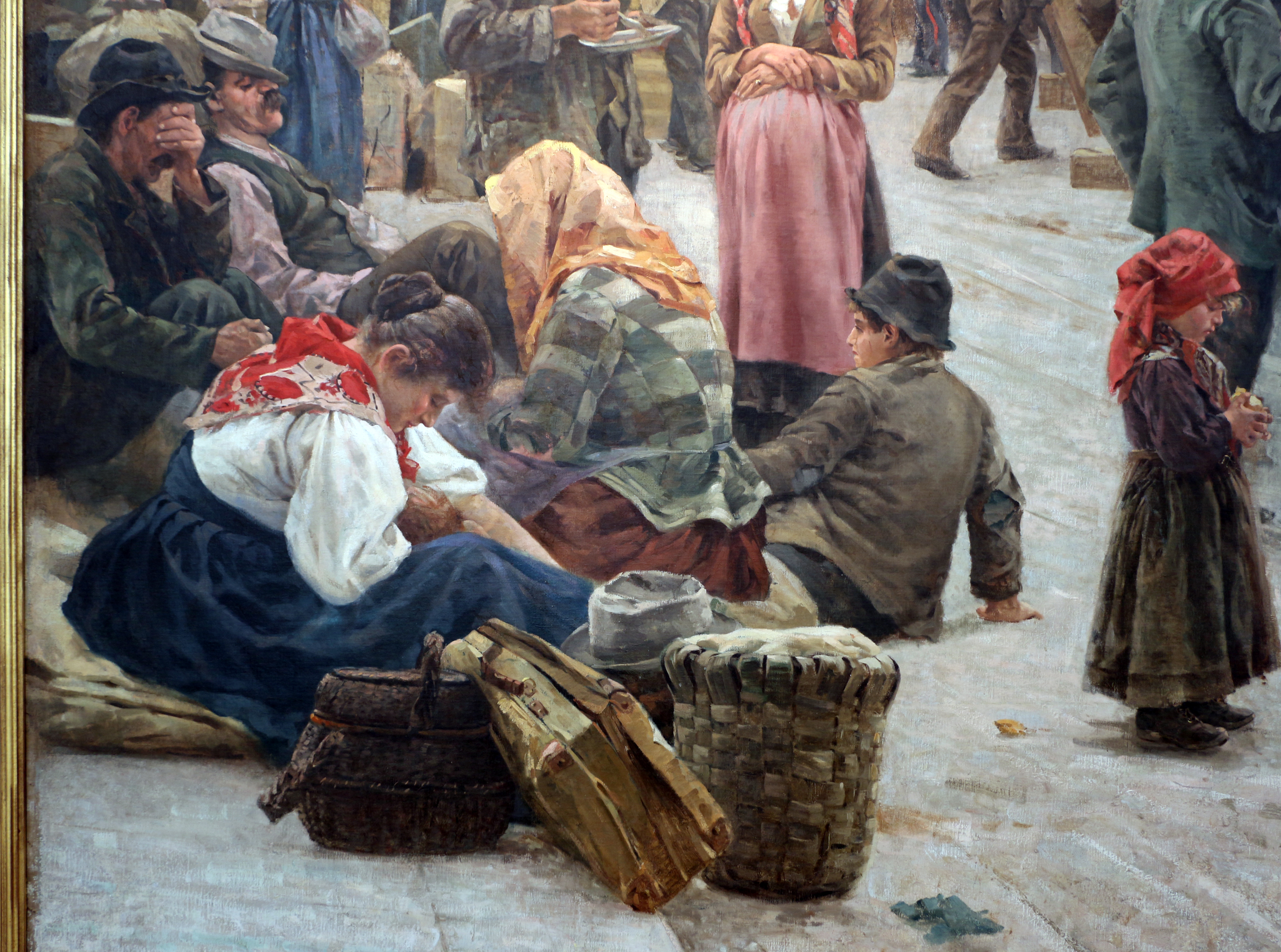
Gli emigranti (detail), 1896, GNAM

Angiolo Tommasi (1858 –1923) was an Italian painter, active in the Macchiaioli movement. He was the brother of the painter Ludovico and cousin of the painter Adolfo Tommasi; all three were influential for the arts in their native Tuscany in the late 19th and early 20th centuries. Angiolo painted both genre and landscape themes.

== Biography ==
Tommasi was born in Livorno. He first studied at the Scuola Comunale di Disegno in his native city under professor Natale Betti and Angiolo Lemmi, and then moved to Florence, where he enrolled for two years in the Academy of Fine Arts under Giuseppe Ciaranfi. Afterwards he was mentored, like his other family members, in painting landscapes by Silvestro Lega.

His first works at the 1882 Promotrice of Florence were small vedute: Via Torretta a San Salvi and Lo scoglio della Madonna ad Antignano, accompanied by Una festa di vecchio; and the next year: Pensiero; Il desinare di Bussotto; Sull' Ema; In podere; Sull'Arno; and Ricomincia a piovere. Gubernatis said Tommasi's 1885 painting Studio dal vero:

depicts the moment of raising the eucharist just outside a small parochial church during a peasant festival, when the townsfolk can not be accommodated inside the church, and, as is their custom, crowd outside of the door. For the solemn ceremony, some of peasants are prostrate on his knees, others, head bowed, reverent, all collected in themselves. The figures are many. The canvas will immediately attracts to itself for what is spontaneous, simple, large, well thought out. ... nor caricature, nor ostentation, nor charlatanism, nor adherence to the in voices that call him to join the crowd, nor looking for cheap tricks, nothing theatrical: the natural observed calmly, without fever and without dismay, by a man sure of himself. He did not give his picture a pompous title, bit simply called it: Studio dal Vero. The young Angelo Tommasi inspires already a deep respect. You find a soul, and a soul that has something important to say. In this painter is a man who thinks, and in his work a concept.

Tommasi subsequently exhibited: The smoker (il fumatore); Washerwomen at Etna; and an outdoor portrait of his sister. He also painted Sull'aia' ; La nonna; Il Gabbro; and a half-figure of Ciociaro. In 1886 at Livorno, he exhibited another Studio dal vero; and the next year, at Florence: Studio di vecchia; and il Ritorno dalla Fonte. To Venice he sent: Il riposo delle Gabbrigiane. After this he completed: Mattina d'estate, Bella Marina, which won a bronze medal at the 1889 Paris Exhibition, and was later exhibited in Chicago. At the 1889 Promotrice of Florence, Tommasi exhibited: Il pescatore di rezzaglio; Dopo il libeccio; Marina and, Ultime vangate. This last painting was awarded first prize, the Prize of Florence (2000 lire). Tommasi also painted portraits, for example: of signor Samama of Livorno, of signor Malenchini, of signor De Witt, of the naval engineer Orlando, and Comm. Costella, Sindaco of Livorno. In 1885, he exhibited a A figure of a Lady. Tommasi also sent a large canvas titled Studio dal vero to the Exposition. In relation to the painting Contadini che vangano (Ultime vangate), Gubernatis states that:

the artist lives the life of its models, because it invokes a feeling of fatigue and of piety, noting that poor people sentenced to work so rude; .... the large canvas by Angiolo Tommasi does not, however the feeling that animates the paintings of Niccolò Cannicci but imposes the tough reality, just posits what the eye sees ... Three and two peasant farmers who excavate the earth, turning their backs to the viewer, which is before a vague expanse of fields, already immersed in the calm evening light, the sun has set, and the smoking chimneys of the nearby village proclaim dinner time . The five figures have life, movement, energy, the country opens up before you, realistic, ample, spacious, and the eye goes for a long stretch and lose to the last line of the distant horizon.

The Tommasi house in Florence was a meeting place for painters and artists including Fattori, Borrani, and Colcos and other members of the circle of artists at the Caffè Michelangiolo. Tommasi also completed a number of trips to South America, including Patagonia and Tierra del Fuego. Paintings from these trips, sometimes commissioned by the Argentine government, were exhibited in Buenos Aires.

Returning from Argentina, he moved to Torre del Lago where he was surrounded by the "Club della Bohème", which included artists Giacomo Puccini, Ferruccio Pagni, Francesco Fanelli, Plinio Nomellini, and Raffaello Gambogi.

Tommasi died in 1923 in Torre del Lago Puccini, Lucca.
