= Carolina Loff =

Cape Verde and Portuguese communist (1911–1999)

- Born: 12 November 1911; Praia, Santiago, Cape Verde
- Died: 6 March 1999 (aged 87); Lisbon, Portugal
- Education: Escola Secundária Maria Amália Vaz de Carvalho
- Alma mater: International Lenin School
- Organization(s): Federation of Portuguese Communist Youth; Communist International
- Political party: Portuguese Communist Party
- Partner(s): Carlos Luis Correia Matoso; Júlio de Almeida
- Children: 1

Carolina Loff da Fonseca (12 November 1911 – 6 March 1999), known as Carolina Loff, was a Portuguese communist activist born in Cape Verde. She participated in the Spanish Civil War for the Communist International and was a member of the Portuguese Communist Party (Portuguese: Partido Comunista Português, PCP). She operated under pseudonyms including Maria Luisa, Berta Mouchet, Marta da Costa and Sylvie. She was expelled from the PCP due to her relationship with a Portuguese secret police inspector, which developed while she was imprisoned for her communist activities.

== Biography ==
Loff was born on 12 November 1911 in Praia, Santiago, Cape Verde. Her parents were journalist Carlos Eugénio de Vasconcelos and Ida Loff da Fonseca. Loff's maternal grandfather was allegedly a Russian general who went into exile in Cape Verde, but the reasons for his exile are unknown. Among her maternal great-grandparents were "a Ukrainian by the nickname Loff and the Belgian Lydia Leger."

Loff emigrated to Portugal with her mother when she was aged 15. She was educated at the Escola Secundária Maria Amália Vaz de Carvalho [pt] in Lisbon.

By when she was aged 17, Loff had joined the Federation of Portuguese Communist Youth (FJCP). Loff also joined the Portuguese Communist Party (Portuguese: Partido Comunista Português, PCP). She campaigned against the National Dictatorship (Portuguese: Ditadura Nacional), attended communist meetings, wrote manifestos, produced press articles, put up red flags and printed pamphlets. She was a member of the first female communist cell, organized by Wilma Freund. She operated under pseudonyms including Maria Luisa, Berta Mouchet, Marta da Costa and Sylvie.

Loff was arrested for her communist activism for the first time on 6 September 1932, while she was pregnant with her daughter Helena by her communist comrade Carlos Luis Correia Matoso. She was imprisoned for a year in the Monastery of the Mónicas (Portuguese: Cadeia das Mônicas) and, after her release, began agitating against the authoritarian Estado Novo regime.

In March 1935, Loff attended the International Lenin School (Russian: Международная Ленинская школа (МЛШ), romanized: Mezhdunarodnaya Leninskaya shkola (MLSh)) in Moscow, Soviet Union, by the invitation of Francisco de Paula Oliveira [pt]. She left her daughter Helena to be raised in Soviet Union, where she attended a school in Ivanovo for the children of Communist International officials.

While operating in the Second Spanish Republic on the service of the Communist International during the Spanish Civil War (1936–1939), Loff worked for Radio Barcelona. She was in Spain under a false passport with the name Berta Mouchet and claimed to be a Belgian journalist. After the defeat of the Republican faction in the Spanish Civil War, Loff was arrested in Valencia and was taken to the Spanish-Portuguese border in October 1939.

In Portugal, Loff operated underground under the pseudonym Maria Luisa and continued to agitate against the Estado Novo regime. On 30 May 1940, Loff was arrested by the International and State Defense Police (Portuguese: Polícia Internacional e de Defesa do Estado, PIDE), Portugal's secret police force. She was released from prison in 1941.

During her detention, Loff had been interrogated by Portuguese secret police inspector Júlio de Almeida. They later became lovers, despite being on opposing political sides. She was expelled from the PCP over the relationship. Ruben de Carvalho's wife Madalena Soares said that: "It was a great love story, they lived together for 10 years. For us, it may be completely incomprehensible. It's difficult to accept that a person like her, with her past, had a romantic relationship with someone without her basic principles." In 1958, Almeida moved to Angola, where he died of malaria.

During World War II, Loff's daughter Helena remained in the Soviet Union. Loff's cousin stated that: "We went a long time without hearing about the girl. With German troops at the gates of Moscow, they sent the children to the countryside, to some Republic, where nobody knew about them. Fortunately, they were thus saved from the war, because they were all children of Republicans, especially those who had fought in the Spanish Civil War."

It has been speculated by José Pacheco Pereira that Loff acted as an agent for the People's Commissariat for Internal Affairs (Russian: Народный комиссариат внутренних дел, romanized: Narodnyy komissariat vnutrennikh del) then was Soviet spy. She was also classified as a member of the Red Orchestra by America's Central Intelligence Agency (CIA).

In the late 1940s, Loff found employment in the French owned Minas da Borralha [pt] mines in Montalegre, Norte, Portugal. She was later able to reunite with her daughter.

== Death and legacy ==
Loff died on 6 March 1999 in Lisbon, Portugal, aged 87.

In 2002, a fictionalised historical romance novel inspired by Loff and Almeida, where they are renamed Zulmira and Esmeraldo, was published. The book was written by Vasco Graça Moura and was titled The Enigma of Zulmira (Portuguese: O Enigma de Zulmira).
