= Vasco Graça Moura =

Portuguese politician

Vasco Graça Moura GCSE GCIH OSE
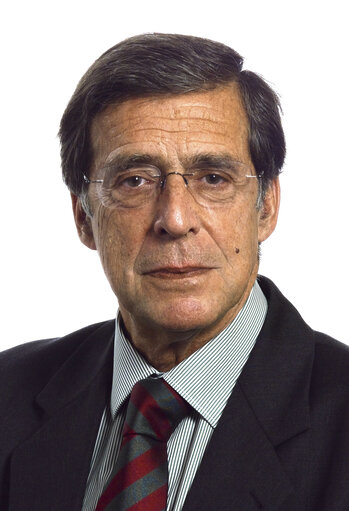

Member of the European Parliament Elections: 1999, 2004
- In office 20 July 1999 – 13 July 2009
- Constituency: Portugal

Personal details
- Born: Vasco Navarro da Graça Moura; 3 January 1942 Foz do Douro, Porto, Portugal
- Died: 27 April 2014 (aged 72) Lisbon, Portugal
- Party: National: Social Democratic Party; European: European People's Party
- Education: University of Lisbon
- Occupation: Writer, translator, politician
- Profession: Lawyer

Vasco Navarro da Graça Moura, GCSE GCIH OSE (3 January 1942 – 27 April 2014) was a Portuguese lawyer, writer, translator and politician. He was the son of Francisco José da Graça Moura and Maria Teresa Amado da Cunha Seixas Navarro de Castro, of Northern Portugal bourgeoisie.

He was a Member of the European Parliament for the Social Democratic Party–People's Party coalition; part of the European People's Party–European Democrats group.

He was Library Director of the Cultural Foundation Calouste Gulbekian in Paris where in 2011 he presented the novels Rosa by Mário Cláudio, and Noir Toscan by Anna Luisa Pignatelli. The books were published in 2009 by Éditions de la Différence, a publishing house founded in Paris by the Portuguese poet Joaquim Vital and his wife Colette Lambrichs.

He married three times: first, in 1964 to Maria Fernanda de Carvalho de Sá Dantas; second, in 1985, to Clara Crabbé da Rocha (daughter of Miguel Torga); and, third, in 1987, to Maria do Rosário Bandeira de Lima de Sousa Machado (b. c. 1951), former and first wife of António Carlos Guerra Raposo de Magalhães, who died in 2004. He died on 27 April 2014 at the age of 72, after a long battle against cancer.

His published works include:

Poetry

- Modo Mudando (Changing Ways) (1963);
- Semana Inglesa (English Week) (1965);
- O Mês de Dezembro e Outros Poemas (The Month of December and Other Poems) (1976);
- A Sombra das Figuras (The Shadow of Figures) (1985);
- O Concerto Campestre (The Field Concert) (1993);
- Sonetos Familiares (Familiar Sonnets) (1994);
- Uma Carta no Inverno (A Map in the Winter) (1997);
- Nó cego, o Regresso (Blind knot, Return) (2000);
- Testamento de VGM (VGM's Will) (2001);
- Letras do Fado Vulgar (Lyrics of Common Fado) (2001);
- Antologia dos Sessenta Anos (Anthology of Seventy Years) (2002);
- Variações Metálicas (Metallic Changes) 2004);
- Mais Fados & Companhia (More Fados and Company) (2004);
- Os nossos tristes assuntos (Our Sad Affairs) (2006);
- O Caderno da Casa das Nuvens (The Notebook from the Home of the Clouds) (2010);
- Poesia Reunida (Poetry Reunited), vol. 1 (2012);
- Poesia Reunida, vol. 2 (2012);
- A Puxar ao Sentimento - 31 Fadinhos de Autor (Verging on Feeling - 31 Little Fados by the Author) (2018, posthumous)

Essays

- Luís de Camões: Alguns Desafios (Some Challenges) (1980);
- Caderno de Olhares (List of Views) (1983);
- Camões e a Divina Proporção (Camões and the Divine Ratio) (1985);
- Os Penhascos e a Serpente (The Rocke and the Serpent) (1987);
- Várias Vozes (Various Voices) (1987);
- Fernão Gomes e o Retrato de Camões (Fernão Gomes and the Picture of Camões) (1987);
- Cristóvão Colombo e a floresta das asneiras (Christopher Columbus and the forest of blunders) (1991);
- Sobre Camões, Gândavo e Outras Personagens (On Camões, Gandâvo and Other Characters) 2000);
- Adamastor, Nomen Gigantis (Adamastor, the Name of the Giant) (2000);
- Páginas do Porto (Pages from Porto) (2001);
- Fantasia e Objectividade nos Descobrimentos Portugueses (Fantasy and Objectivity in the Portuguese Age of Discovery) (2006);
- Acordo Ortográfico: A Perspectiva do Desastre (Orthographic Agreement: Perspective on Disaster) (2008);
- Diálogo com (algumas) imagens (Dialogue with (some) images) (2009);
- Amália Rodrigues: dos poetas populares aos poetas cultivados (from popular poets to cultured poets) (2010);
- Miguel Veiga - Cinco Esboços para um Retrato (Five Sketches for a Portrait) (2011);
- Os Lusíadas para Gente Nova (The Lusiads for the New Person) (2012);
- A Identidade Cultural Europeia (The European Cultural Identity) (2013);
- Discursos Vários Poéticos (Various Poetic Discourses) (2013);
- Retratos de Camões (Portraits of Camões) (2014).

Novellas

- O pequeno-almoço do Sargento Beauchamp: (uma novela) (Sergeant Beauchamp's breakfast; a novella) (2008)
- Os Desmandos de Violante (The Disobediences of Violence(?)) (2011)

Novels

- Quatro Últimas Canções (Four Last Songs) (1987);
- Naufrágio de Sepúlveda (Wreck of Sepúlveda) (1988);
- Partida de Sofonisba às seis e doze da manhã (1993);
- A Morte de Ninguém (The Death of No One) (1998);
- Meu Amor, Era de Noite (My Love, it wasn't of Night) (2001);
- Enigma de Zulmira (Mystery of Zulmira, inspired by Carolina Loff) (2002);
- Por detrás da magnólia (Behind the Magnolia) (2008);
- Alfreda ou a Quimera (Alfred or the Chimera) (2008);
- Morte no Retrovisor (Death in the Rearview Mirror) (2008);
- O Mestre de Música (The Master of Music) (2015) (continuation of the novella Sargeant Beauchamp's breakfast);
- As botas do Sargento (The Sergeant's boots)

Diaries and Chronicles

- Circunstâncias Vividas (Lived Circumstances) (1995);
- Contra Bernardo Soares e Outras Observações (Against Bernardo Soares and Other Observations) (1999).

Translations

- Fedra, by Racine
- Andromache, by Racine
- Berenice, by Racine
- Le Cid, by Corneille
- The Divine Comedy, by Dante
- Cyrano de Bergerac, by Edmond Rostand
- The Misanthrope, by Molière
- Sonnets, by Shakespeare
- François Villon's will and some other ballads (1997)
- La Vita Nuova, by Dante Alighieri
- Some love poems, by Ronsard
- Duino Elegies and Sonnets to Orpheus, de Rainer Maria Rilke
- Triumphs, by Petrarch
- Rhymes, by Petrarch
- The Poem on the Disaster of Lisbon, by Voltaire

Antologias

- As mais belas Histórias Portuguesas de Natal (Some more lovely Portuguese Stories of Christmas);
- 366 Poemas que Falam de Amor (366 Poems that Talk about Love);
- Visto da Margem Sul do Rio o Porto (View at the South Bank of the Porto River)
- O Binómio de Newton e a Vénus de Milo. (The Binomial of Newton and Milo's Venus).

== See also ==
- Portuguese Poetry
