= Ferenc Markó =

Hungarian painter (1832–1874)

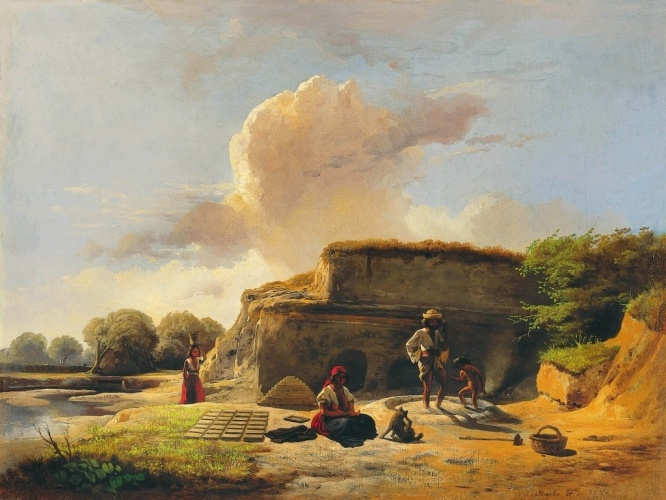
Making Bricks

Ferenc Markó (3 June 1832 – 3 August 1874) was a Hungarian painter who specialized in landscapes, usually with figures. His father was the painter Károly Markó the Elder. His brothers, Károly Markó the Younger (Carlo) and András Markó (Andrea), were also painters.

== Life and work ==
Markó was born on 3 June 1832 in Kismarton (now Eisenstadt, Austria). His initial training in art came from his father. He then joined his brothers in Italy and spent two years at the Accademia di Belle Arti di Firenze, where he made paintings of figures and nude drawings. He also became involved in the First Italian War of Independence and was imprisoned. After his release, he was banished from Italy and moved to Pest in 1853.

He was a frequent exhibitor at the Pesti Műegylet (Pest Art Association) and the Kunstverein in Vienna. A large selection of his works may be seen at the Hungarian National Gallery. They are often confused with those of his father.

Markó died on 3 August 1874 in Budapest.
