= Natale Betti =

Italian painter (1826–1888)

Natale Betti (1826–1888) was an Italian painter.

== Biography ==
He was born in Livorno. He studied art under Giuseppe Baldini at Livorno, then in Rome with Tommaso Minardi, and finally at the Academy of Fine Arts of Florence with Giuseppe Bezzuoli and Benedetto Servolini. In 1846 at Florence, he exhibited a San Giovanni Battista.

In 1848, he joined the Italian armies and fought at Goito and Curtatone. He would paint canvases of these experiences, including L'esule italiano (1859, first exhibited in Genoa). After the war, he did not find local favor from the authorities of the Grand-Duchy of Tuscany. In 1860, with the annexation to the Kingdom of Sardinia, he painted The Reception of Vittorio Emanuele II to Livorno for the latter city's town hall.

He also painted genre scenes such as La ricreazione (exhibited in 1873 at Vienna) and La lavanderia (exhibited in 1887 at Florence). From 1874, helped found and taught at the School of Arts and Crafts of Livorno, where his pupils included Guglielmo Micheli, Marco Lemmi, and Angiolo Tommasi.
