= Luigi de Servi =

Italian painter

Luigi De Servi (4 June 1863 – 25 June 1945) was a French-Italian painter active mainly painting sacred subjects in a late-Mannerist style in Siena, Tuscany, Italy.

== Biography ==
He was born in Lucca to a painter named Pietro de Servi. He left during the second year of gymnasium, despite his father's opposition, to enroll in the Regio Istituto di Belle Arti di Lucca, under the director Luigi Norcini. He first exhibited four works at the 29th Esposizione della Società Promotrice di Belle Artists in Genoa.

In 1883, along with his eldest sister, a seamstress, he travelled to Argentina while twelve siblings remain in Lucca. He sold a number of works in Buenos Aires, and soon obtained commissions for portraits, signing "Luis De Servi". He enticed most of his siblings to move to Argentina. In 1884, he painted frescoes for the "Casa Rosada" in Buenos Aires. He also decorated the entrance rotonda, depicting the primitive life of the Argentines, of the Museo de La Plata. In 1886, he painted a Triumph of the Province of Buenos Aires for the Vestibule of the Senate Chamber in Buenos Aires. In 1887, the province commissioned portraits of 70 governors from 1810 to 1877 to be exhibited in Casa Rosada. He lost nearly all his investments in a bank failure. He decided to briefly return to Lucca, but returned to Argentina for another year.

In 1890–1891, he returned to Lucca, and opened a studio. He linked up with Michele Marcucci and Domenico Martinelli, to fresco 12 lunettes in the arches of the choir in the city cemetery. Due to scarce commissions in Lucca, he worked for 20 months in London mainly as a portrait artist. In 1892, he returned to Lucca to paint frescoes in Villa Lavarello, Varazze and for the church of Santa Caterina in Lucca. In 1893, he travelled to Paris to paint portraits for the Argentine Augusto Belin Sarmiento, but also gained local commissions. He returned to Italy to paint the apse of the church of Santa Maria degli Angeli ad Alassio.

In 1898, he painted the decorations for the piano room of the house of Giacomo Puccini in Torre del Lago. He worked alongside Plinio Nomellini, Ferruccio Pagni, and Edoardo De Albertis.

In 1905, he frescoed the railroad station of Genova Brignole. In 1906, he was named Cavaliere della Corona d'Italia. In 1909, he joined the "Giovane Italia", artistic group. He travels to Uruguay, Argentina and Paris.

In 1910, De Servi returned to Buenos Aires to fresco the ceiling of the Presidential room in the Palazzo del Governo, and also painted panels depicting L'Italia al Mar del Piata for the Bank of Italy and Rio de La Piata. In 1914, De Servi returned to Italy, where he continues to paint portraits. In 1915, he painted the main altarpiece of the church of San Cristoforo in Lucca, depicting the name saint. In 1917 and 1918 he had personal expositions in Viareggio and Lucca respectively. In 1920–1922, he returned to Argentina. In 1923, he painted a portrait of Mussolini for Sena and Carlo Spiccani, that was gifted to Mussolini himself.

In 1924, De Servi wrote an open letter to the "Giornale d'Italia", criticizing the paper's confrontation of the government. As a fascist, he declared he would now boycott the paper he once loyally read. In 1926, he was named secretary of the newly established Fascist Syndicate of Lucchese Artists.

In 1926, he exhibited in the foyer of the Teatro Nazionale of Rome. In 1931, he had personal exhibitions at Lucca and Viarregio. In 1933, he painted two large canvases for the new Cassa di Risparmio di Lucca. In 1938, he exhibited at a "Mostra di pittori liguri dell'Ottocento", at the Palazzo Rosso, Genoa. In 1939, he had a personal exhibition at the Galleria Gerì of Milan.
