= Ludovico Tommasi =

Italian painter (1866–1941)

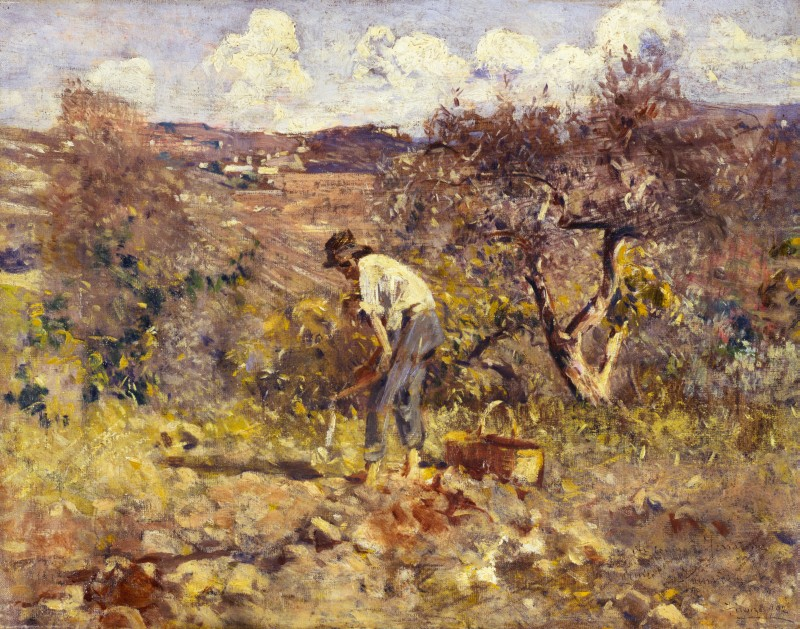
Lavoro in campagna, 1902 ca. (Fondazione Cariplo)

Ludovico Tommasi (1866 in Livorno – 1941 in Florence) was an Italian painter.

== Biography ==
Inspired by the example of his elder brother Angiolo and his cousin Adolfo, Ludovico Tommasi devoted himself to painting, developing his art in close contact with Silvestro Lega, a frequent visitor to the Tommasi family villa at Bellariva. After his military service in Milan between 1888 and 1891, Tommasi and his brother Angiolo frequented the cultural circle that gravitated around Giacomo Puccini at Torre del Lago, and it was here that he came into contact with several exponents of the Tuscan artistic avant-garde, including Galileo Chini and Oscar Ghiglia. Towards the end of the 19th century he became interested in the Divisionist research carried out in that period by his friend Plinio Nomellini. He regularly participated in the principal artistic events in Italy and abroad. In 1913 he was among the participants in the Rome breakaway faction of the Giovane Etruria group that returned to the Tuscan naturalistic tradition, leading to the revival of more classic forms in the years following the First World War. In his maturity he devoted himself to engraving, and in 1912 he opened a school of etching in Florence.

In 1884, he displays Studio al Vero at the Promotrice. In 1886 participated at the First Exposition of Fine Arts of Livorno with "Bellariva sull'Arno a Florence". He continued to exhibit at the Florentine Promotrici. After serving in the military, he exhibits Inverno at the 1894 Florentine Promotrice, and "Notti Umane" at the first Venice Biennale. He joined a group later known as the "Giovane Etruria" (Young Etruria), that in 1913 exhibited their works at the Secessione Romana del 1913. In the 1930s, he painted folk subjects in a severe and monumental style, preferred by the fascists. "Vita semplice", a large canvas was exhibited at the 1930 Venice Biennale.

== Other projects ==
Media related to Ludovico Tommasi at Wikimedia Commons
