= Károly Markó the Younger =

Hungarian-Italian painter (1822–1891)

Károly (Carlo) Markó the Younger
- Born: Károly Markó ifj. 1822; Pest
- Died: 1891 (aged 68–69); Moscow

Károly Markó, also known as Carlo Marco or Markó the Younger (Pest, January 22, 1822 – Moscow, 1891), was a Hungarian-Italian painter, mainly of landscapes.

Carlo's father, Károly Markó the Elder, was born in Hungary and died in Italy. At the age of 16 years, Carlo left his family as they were travelling through Italy and settled in Florence, where he pursued his studies. Later, he was joined there by his brothers, András and Ferenc. Among his works are depictions of the Valle di Quesa near the countryside by Pisa. While he was close with many of the Macchiaoli painters, his style seems to recall that of the Baroque painter Lorrain as well as painters of the School of Posillipo. Among his works are: La Brigata del Boccaccio; Veduta di Bella Riva; Le cave di Carrara; Paese in Corsica; I dintorni di Gaville; and Lungo l ' Arno. Some of his works, such as Christ in Emmaus and The Samaritan at the Well have figures in the scene dwarfed by the landscape, although the landscape itself commented on the events. Some of his works are on display in the Hungarian National Gallery.

He was Professor of the Academy of Fine Arts of Florence, as well as in Genoa, Perugia, and Urbino. Among his pupils were Serafino De Tivoli, Adolfo Tommasi, Ulvi Liegi, and Domenico Bresolin. He later moved to Russia, possibly with a promise of employment (as Italian painters were very much in vogue there at the time) and died in Moscow.

== Gallery ==
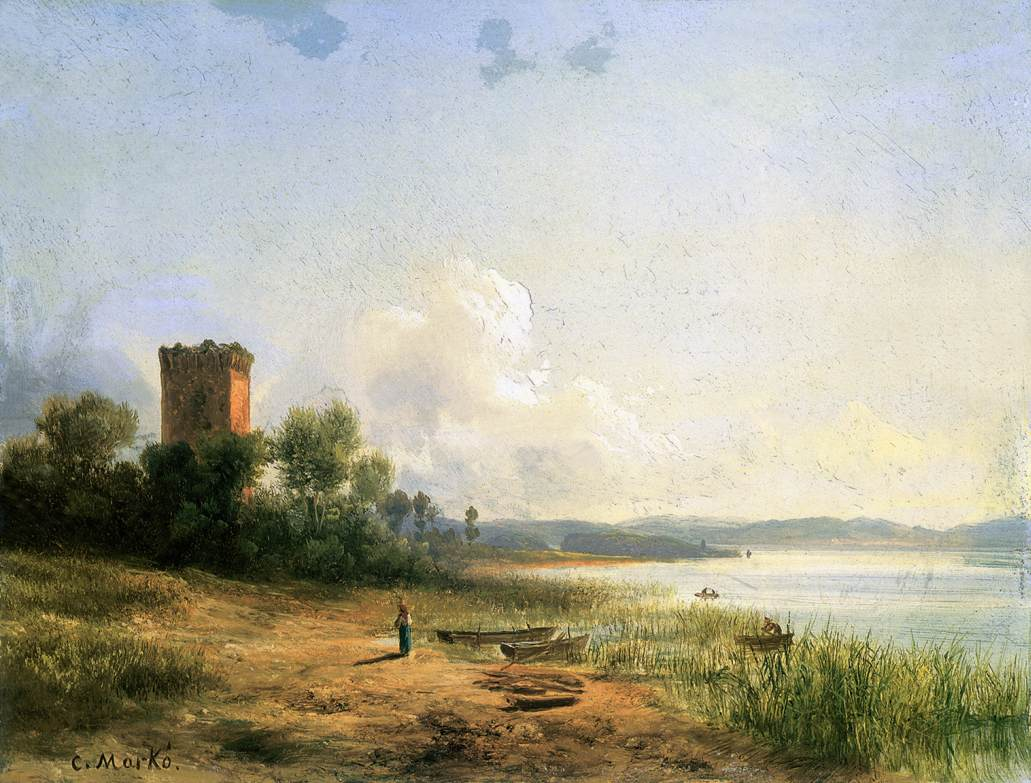
View of Lake Trasimeno

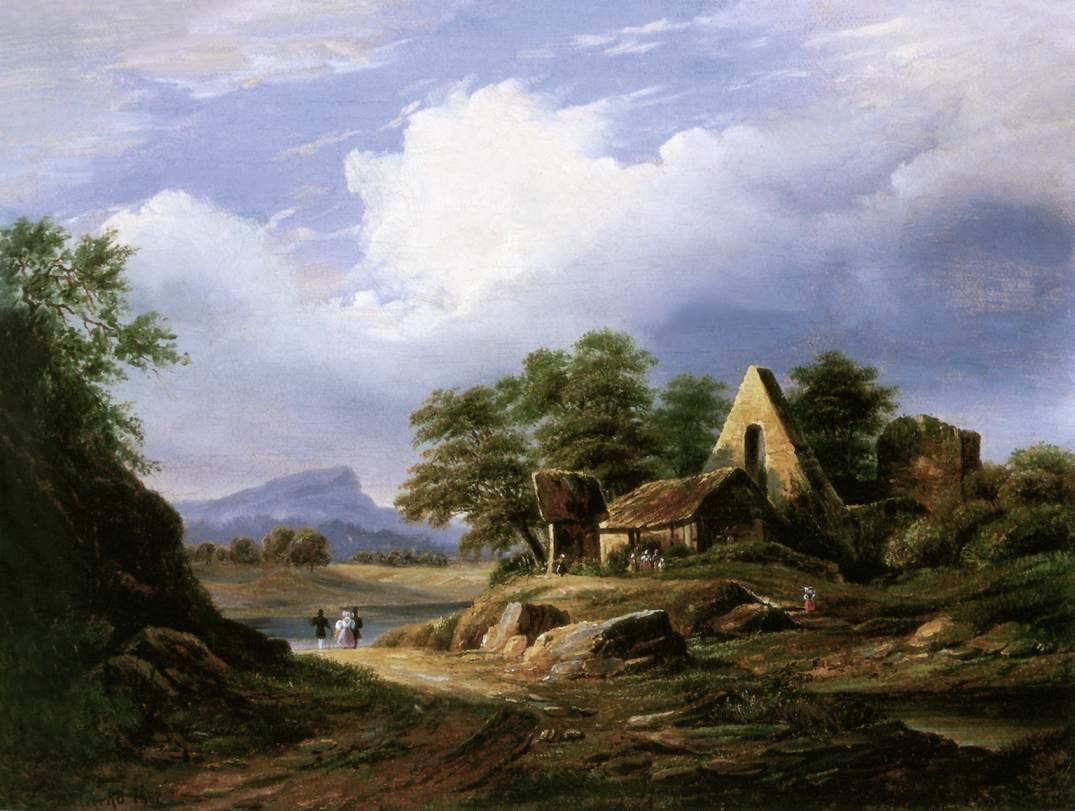
Excursionists in the Italian Countryside

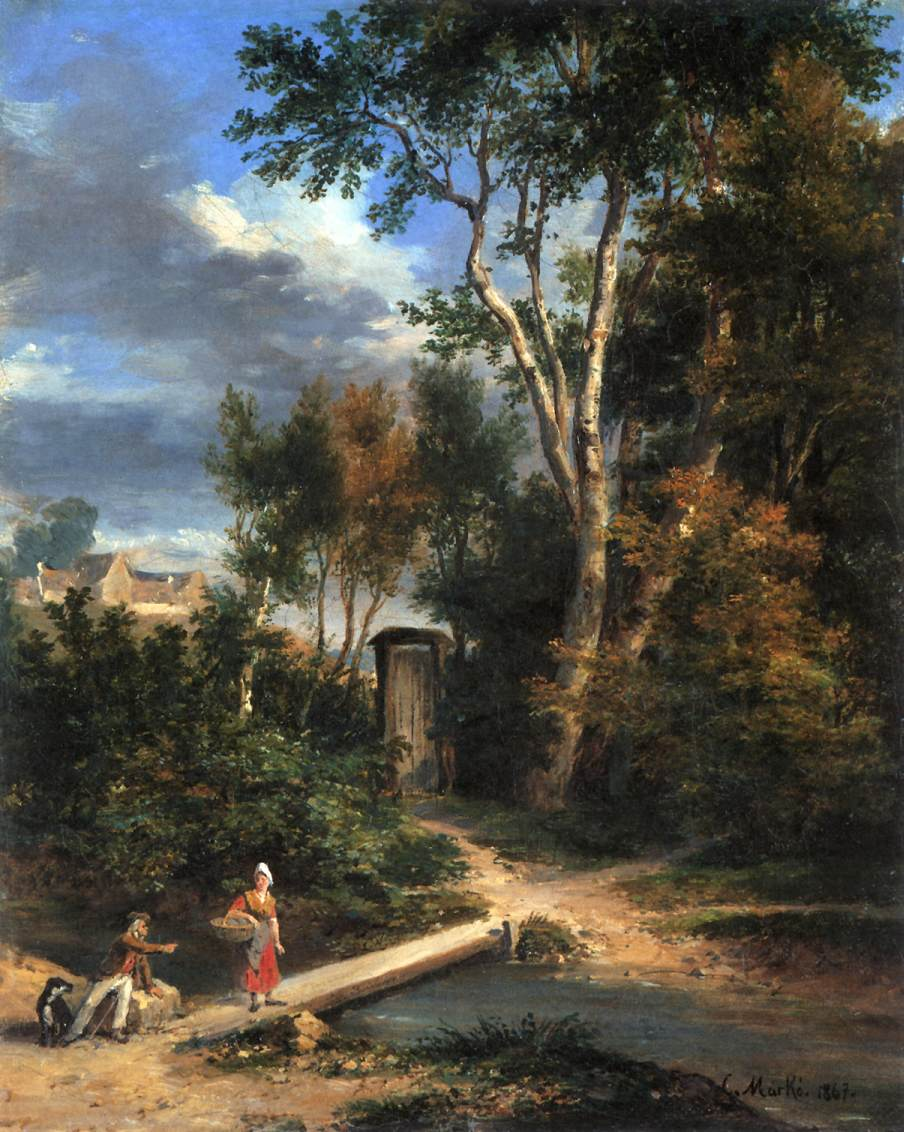
Riverside Scene

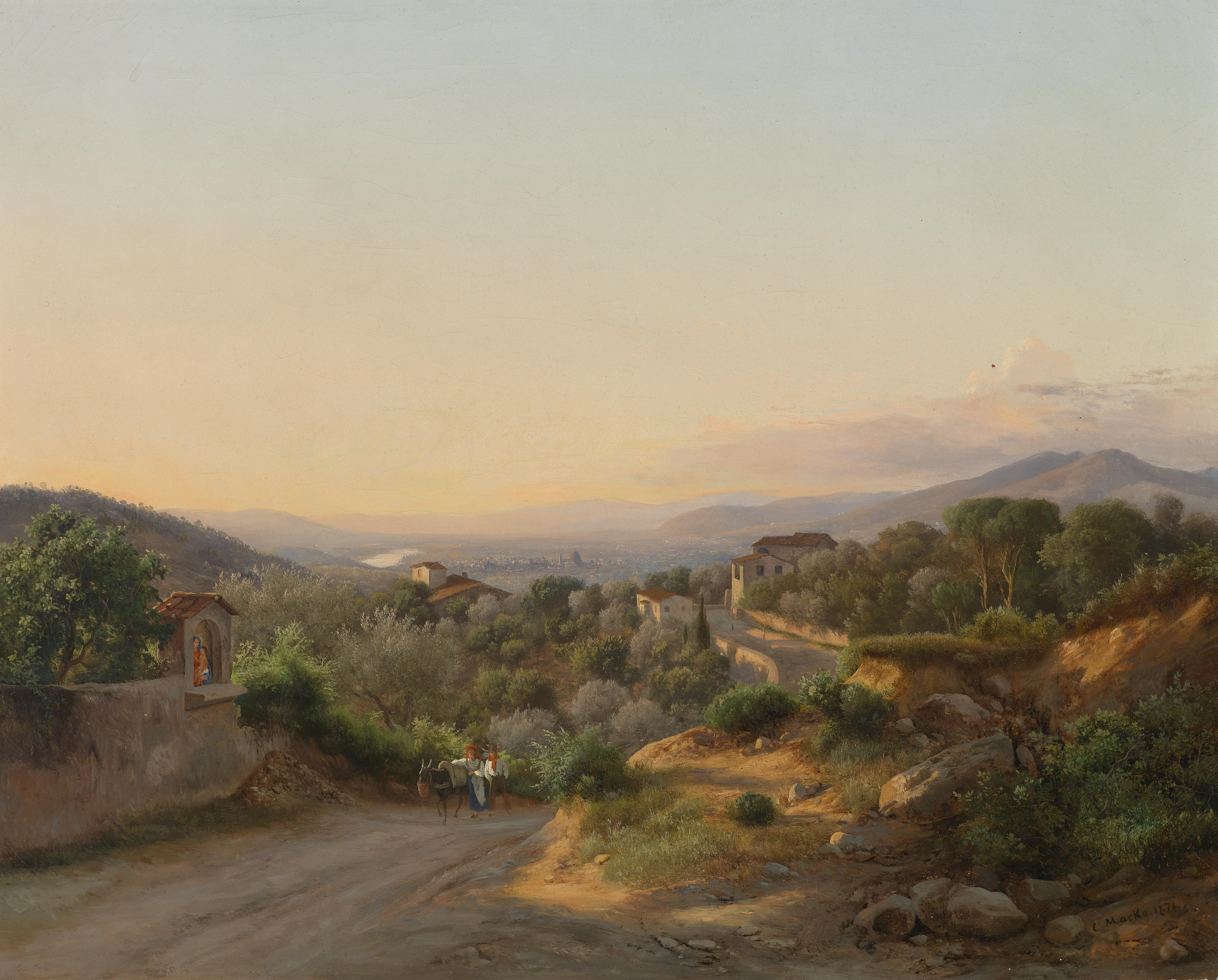
Florence (1871)
