= Rodolfo Tommasi (journalist) =

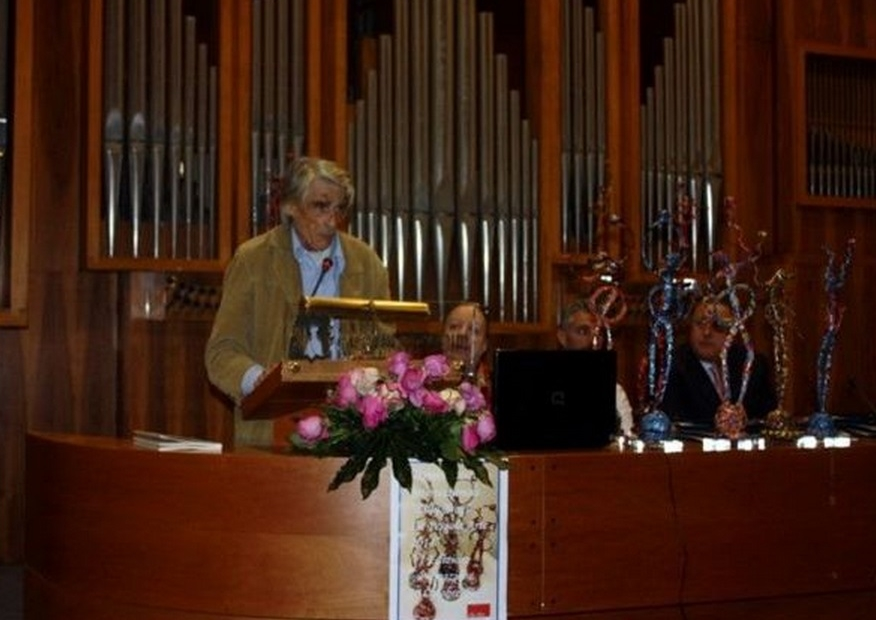
- Rodolfo Tommasi at the awarding ceremony of the literary competition "Lilly Brogi LaPergolaArte" (2014)
- Born: 11 July 1946; Turin, Italy
- Died: 3 August 2015 (aged 69); Florence, Italy
- Occupations: Writer, essayist, journalist, and musical and literary critic

Rodolfo Tommasi (11 July 1946 – 3 August 2015) was an Italian journalist, writer, and musical and literary critic.

== Biography ==
Born in Turin, he moved to Florence where he lived his entire adult life. Since 1964 he developed an intense journalistic activity on literary, music and entertainment sections of newspapers and magazines such as "Il Ponte". On "Letteratura" in 1967 at the invitation of Mario Luzi and Giuseppe Ungaretti he published his first poems. From 1970 to 1997 Tommasi worked for RAI cultural programs of the third Italian public channel (RAI 3). In 1974, with Editore Vallecchi public collection "Sotto stracci di lotte" followed Trilogy of silence, for a performance of "Euridice", "Lorna", "Variazioni sul tema AV", Trilogy of the word, Trilogy of writing and the text of the scenic cantata for the music of Bruno Rigacci Die Umwandlung. In the field essay published "Il Teatro Comunale di Firenze" GE9 Editore in 1987; Pinocchio, a puppet of analysis in 1992, Sansoni "La Casa Sandron, History, Europe" in 1996 Sandron Editore, "Queen barbaric poetry of Dino Campana" in 1998 Editore Polistampa, "reasoned Dictionary of Italian writers of the '900' Helicon Editore in 2004, "Furrows of scriptures" in 2006 Helicon Editore, "Trends languages. Guidelines of contemporary Italian poetry" of 2008 Helicon Editore, The blades of Puccini in 2010 Cloister Harmonious publisher. Texts of poetry and numerous studies on music and appearing in literary magazines and miscellaneous books. Artistic director, in the years 1970–80, major initiatives and musical events such as the stages of Gargonza and the festival "Space Early Music". In recent years he taught Dramaturgy Musical Academy European Union in Florence. He has Fratini Editore "Sotto il pentagramma" in 2013 and "Magiche rime arcane" in 2014 and was curator of the Collection suite for the same publisher. He died on the 3rd of August 2015 in Florence.

== Published works ==
All works are in Italian.

- Il Teatro comunale di Firenze: presenza e linguaggio. Ge9. 1987. ASIN B0061MPU38.
- Pinocchio: analisi di un burattino. Sansoni. 1992. ISBN 8838313857.
- Storia Dell' Editoria D' Europa. (among others). Shakespeare & Co. 1994. ASIN B00I7WDLFY.
- "La scrittura e la sua ombra". Un Pratolini ignorato. Shakespeare and Co. 1995. ISBN 9788881310470.
- La Casa Sandron, la storia, l'Europa. Sandron. 1997. ISBN 978-8886204774.
- Regina Barbara - La poesia di Dino Campana. Polistampa. 1998.
- Artisti italiani contemporanei. Helicon Editore. 2003. ISBN 9788887837414.
- I passi e le Mète. Helicon. 2003.
- Dizionario ragionato degli scrittori italiani del '900. Helicon. 2004. ISBN 9788887837667.
- Feremi ne lo cor sempre tua luce. Helicon. 2005. ISBN 978-8889893050.
- Letteratura italiana contemporanea. Helicon. 2005. ISBN 978-8887837919.
- Solchi di scrittura. (with Giorgio Luti). Helicon. 2006. ISBN 978-8889893203.
- Trilogia della scrittura. Helicon. 2007. ISBN 978-8889893531.
- Labirinto Catottrico. (editor). Helicon. 2008. ISBN 978-8889893555.
- Introductory note in Piero S. Costa (2009). A naufragar si va. Helicon. ISBN 978-8889893975.
- Sotto il pentagramma. Fratini. 2013. ISBN 978-8867940035.
- Magiche Rime Arcane - Visione allegorica in un atto. (with Pietro Rigacci). Fratini. 2014. ISBN 978-8867940141.
