= Károly Markó the Elder =

Hungarian painter (1791-1860)

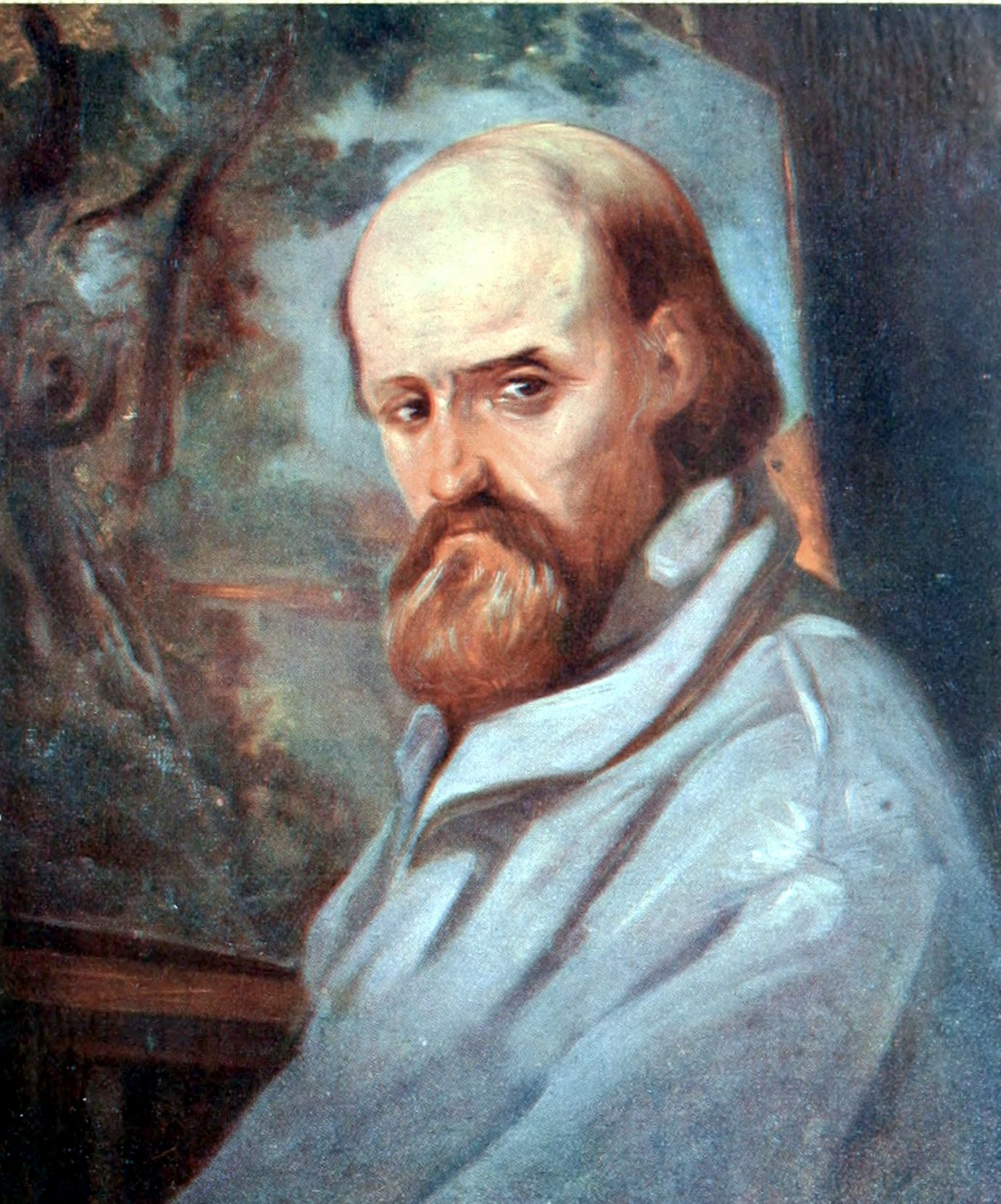
Self-portrait (date unknown)

Károly Markó, also known as Carlo Marco (25 September 1791, Lőcse (today Levoča, Slovakia) – 19 November 1860, at the Villa Medici di Lappeggi near Bagno a Ripoli, Italy) was one of the first Hungarian landscape painters. He is often referred to as "The Elder", to distinguish him from his son, Károly Markó the Younger.

== Biography ==
In the early 1800s, although he was already interested in art, he studied engineering as an apprentice in Pest and Kolozsvár (today Cluj-Napoca, Romania). From 1812 to 1818, after mastering his craft, he worked as an engineer in Ólubló (today Stará Ľubovňa, Slovakia) and Rozsnyó (today Rožňava, Slovakia). It was in the latter city that he produced his first paintings, modeled after those of well-known contemporary artists.

In 1818, he moved to Pest and studied to improve his drawing skills. Four years later, he moved to Vienna, where he enrolled at the Academy of Fine Arts, majoring in history and landscape painting. He married there and ultimately had eight children. From 1826 to 1830, he lived in Kismarton (today Eisenstadt, Austria), then settled on the Eszterházy estates, where he produced copies for art dealers and was increasingly in demand. Under the patronage of a local banker, he returned to Hungary and produced Visegrád, one of his most familiar paintings.

In 1832, he made an extended tour of Italy, visiting Florence, Venice, Bologna and Rome. Unfortunately, he was forced to leave Rome in 1838 when he became ill with malaria and had to stay in Pisa until 1843. While there, he was elected a member of the Hungarian Academy of Sciences. He travelled again, from 1843 to 1848, when he decided to settle permanently somewhere near Florence, eventually taking up residence in a townhouse at Lappeggi, courtesy of Count Gherardesca. He soon became very popular among the local aristocracy and was never short of work to do. Except for one brief painting trip to Hungary in 1853, he would remain there the rest of his life.

His sons András and Ferenc were also well-known painters.

== Selected paintings ==
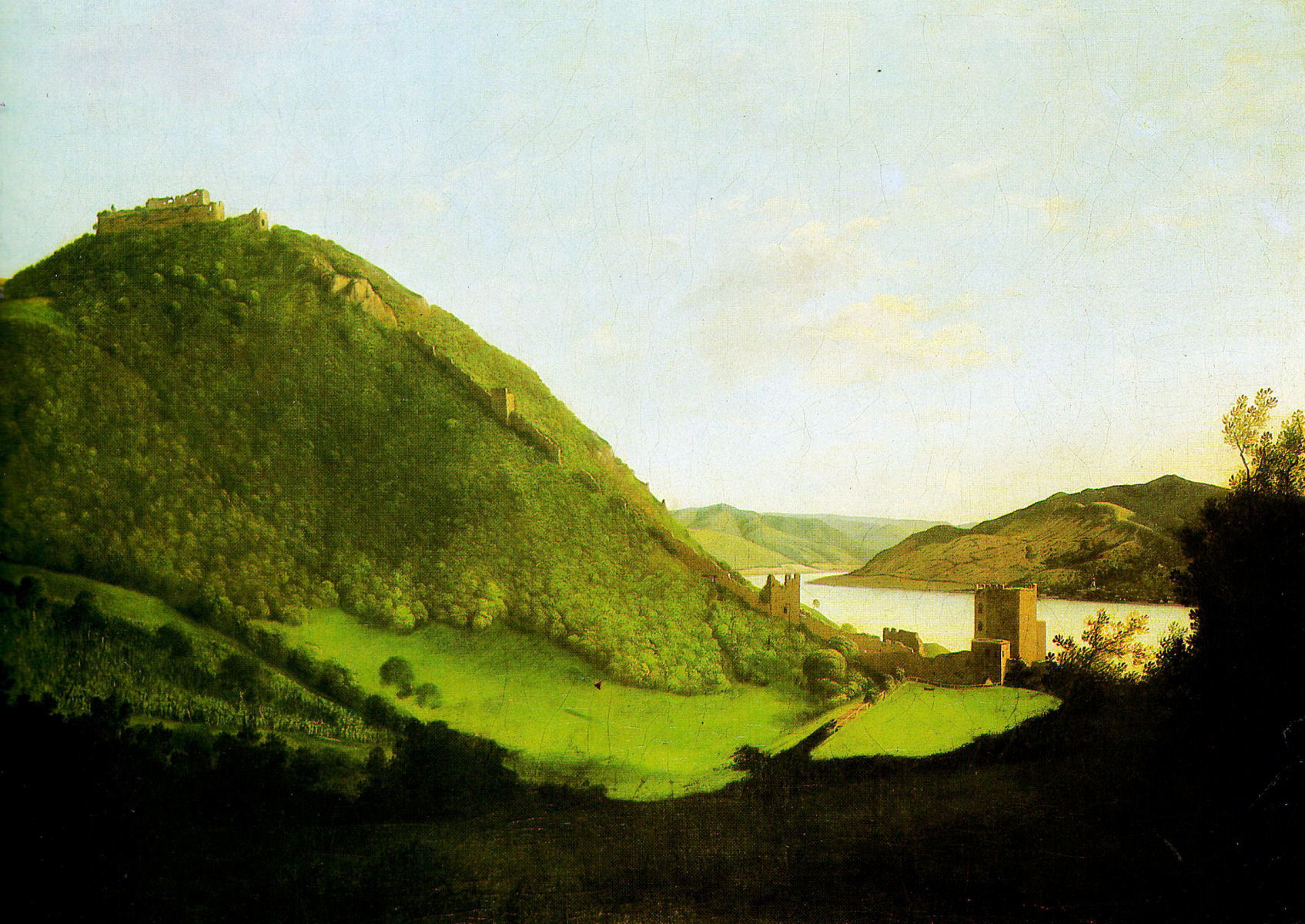
Visegrád (1826)

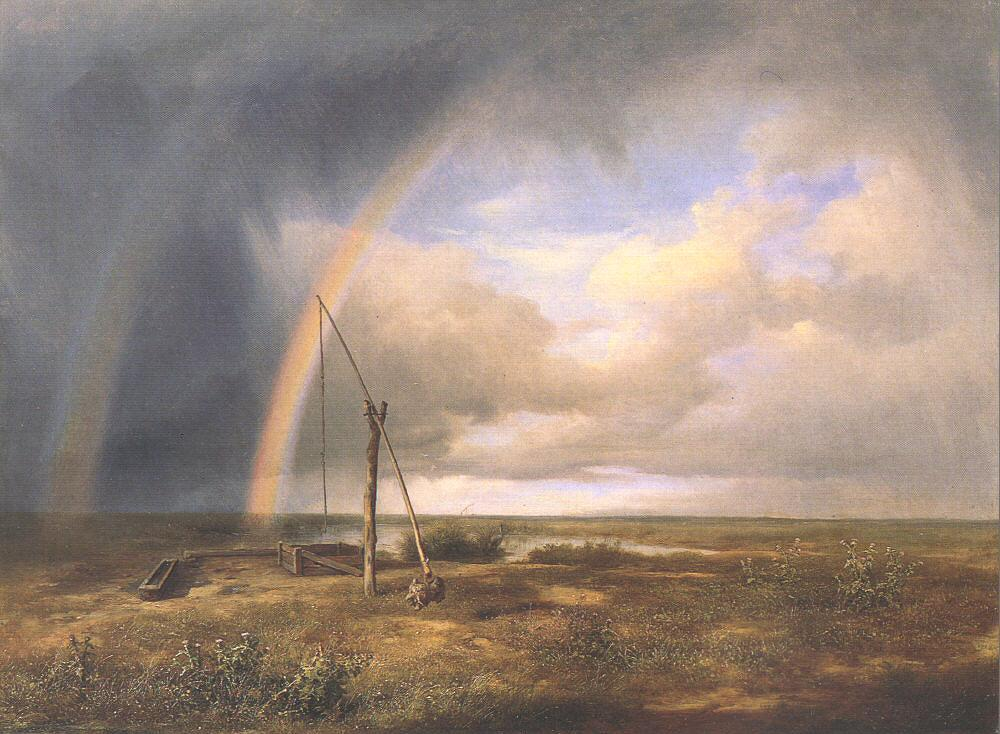
The Puszta (1853)

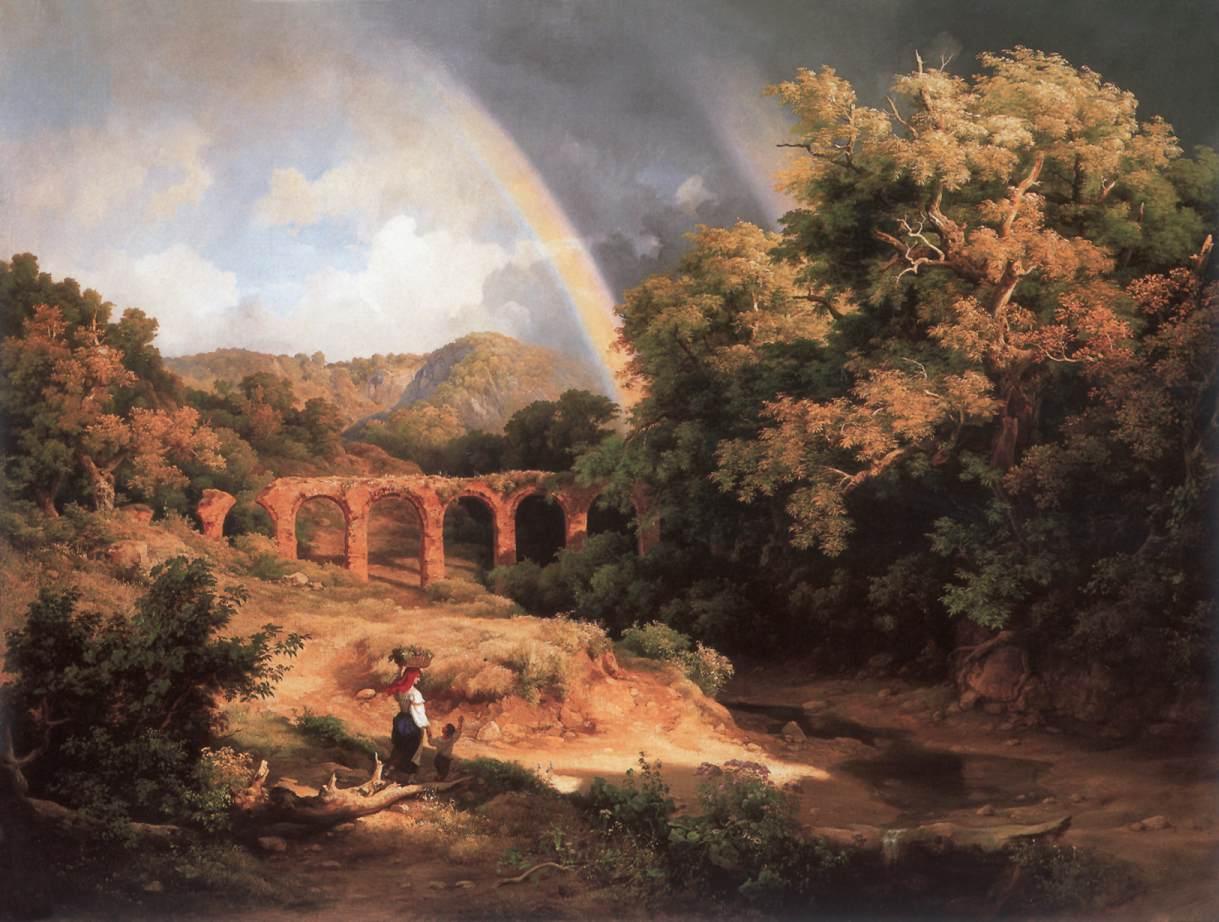
Italian Landscape with Viaduct and Rainbow (1838)

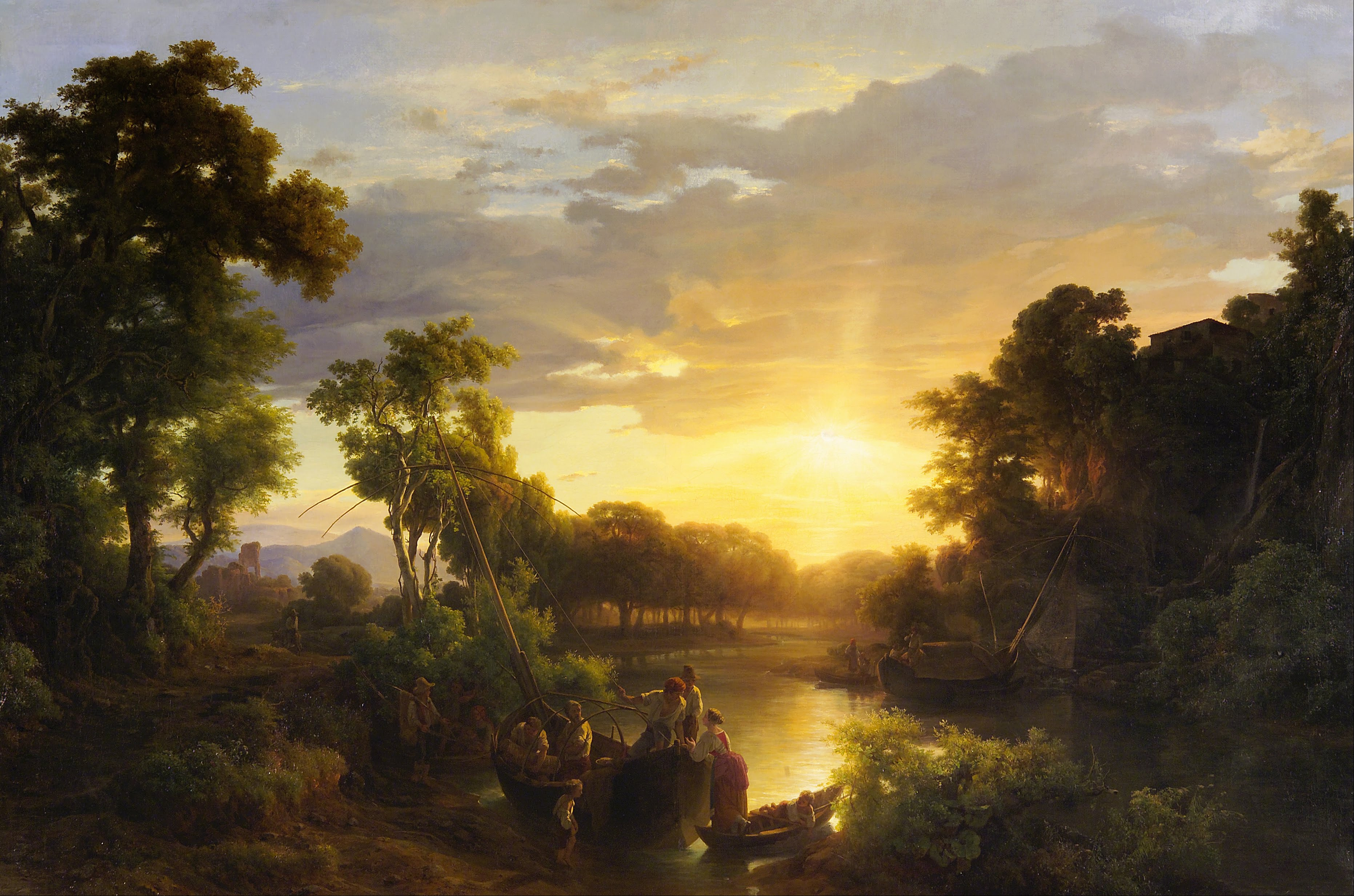
Italian Landscape at Sunset with Fishermen (1851)
