= Adolfo Tommasi =

Italian painter (1851–1933)

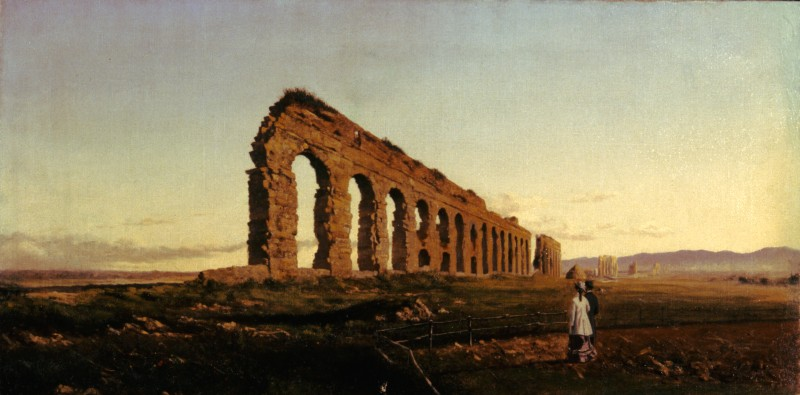
Tourists visit the aqueduct or In the Roman countryside (1877), Fondazione Cariplo

Adolfo Tommasi (1851 in Livorno – 1933 in Florence) was an Italian painter.

== Biography ==
Having left Livorno, Tommasi moved to Florence, where he attended the Academy of Fine Arts and met Silvestro Lega, who taught Adolfo’s younger cousins Angiolo and Ludovico and spent a great deal of time with the Tommasi family. He also briefly studied under Carlo Markò the Younger, but the style of academic painting did not appeal to him.

The first exhibited work, Monte Acuto, won an award in 1877 at Florence, on the occasion of the Artistic-Industrial exhibition for the Feast of San Giovanni. In the 1880 exhibition at Turin, his Dopo la brinata generated controversy. The subject of the painting was a cabbage field affected by frost.

The complaints took aim at the subject that it was a vast field of cabbages affected by frost. Some professors like Rivalta and Cecioni, thought him worthy of a top prize, who was indignant that he had not been discarded. Many newspaper printed bitter criticism, even calling it the work of a madman, and it was also censured by Enrico Panzacchi, but others gave it large commendations. It was defended by Signorini. The illustrated magazine L'Art of Paris praised him.

Having learned the technique of painting from life (dal vero, that is, outdoors, outside the studio, and from direct observation), he presented a markedly naturalistic work at a show of the Società Donatello in 1880 and took part over the following years in the national exhibitions held in Turin (1884), Venice (1887) and Bologna (1888).

In 1884 at Turin, exhibits: il fischio del vapore (The Steam Whistle), acquired by the Government for the Galleria Nazionale d'Arte Moderna of Rome. Camillo Boito in the journal New Anthology noted it mixed modern machinery with simple peasant images.

Awarded a gold medal at the International Exposition of Watercolors, held by the 1893 Milanese Society for the Fine Arts and Permanent Exposition, he produced illustrations for his friend Giovanni Pascoli’s collection of poems entitled Myricae the following year. He painted a series of views of ancient villas and gardens at the end of the century and experimented during his last years of activity with a mixed technique of oils and pastel.

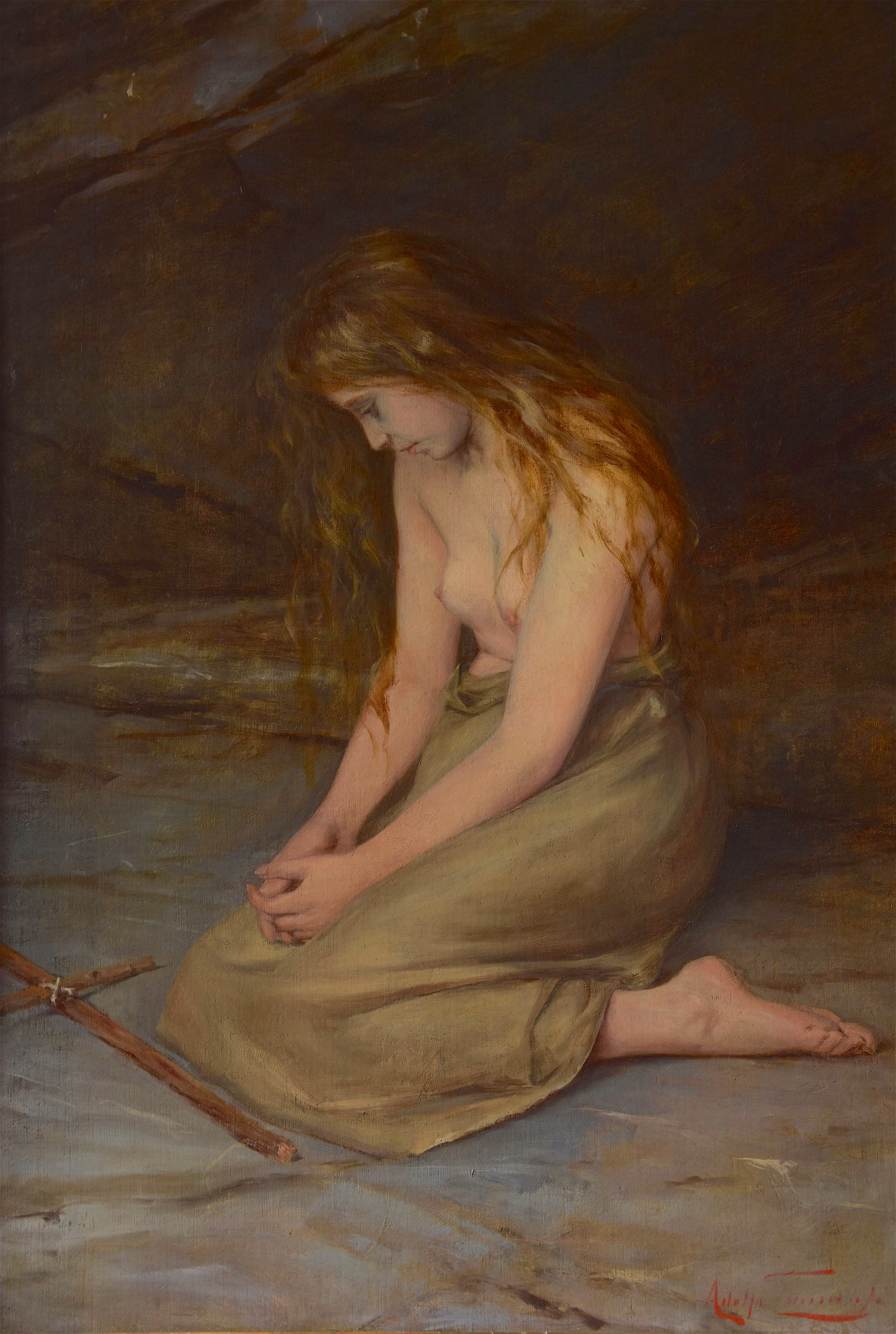
Penitent Magdalene (1893)

Other works include: Littorale Toscano (1887); Sull'Aia, (1888, Vienna); Petriolo near Florence; Alla fonte; Una domenicani decembre; I nuovi viali of Florence; Le ore calde; Dopo il tramonto; Dopo l'acquazzone; Sull'imbrunire; Vagliatura del grano in montagna; Una via di Cutigliano: La Cornia; Uggia; Lago Scaffalalo; Bella riva sull'Arno; Libro Aperto (Appennino Pistoiese); Caccia ai germani; Snows of March; A far rena; I fiori per l'Angelo; Un giorno di scirocco a Peretola; La malerba; Strada provinciale genovese; Bagno di sole; Pineta nella riviera; Antignano; Dopo un giorno di libeccio; Sole di settembre; Un giorno di freddo a Florence; Corollare for the via di Montenero; Caccia ai pettirossi; Di marzo; Ponte a Greve; La fonte; Fiori d' aprile; L'uscita dalla messa; June mid-day; December; Contro luce; Dopo la brina; Primavera; Return from Market; and finally: In parco e Dopo il tramonto.

== Other projects ==
Media related to Adolfo Tommasi at Wikimedia Commons
