= Sabatelli =

Sabatelli is an Italian surname. Notable people with the surname include:

- Felice Sabatelli (1710–1786), Italian astronomer
- Francesco Sabatelli (1803–1830), Italian painter
- Giuseppe Sabatelli (1813–1843), Italian painter
- Luigi Sabatelli (1772–1850), Italian painter, father of Francesco and Giuseppe
