= Francesco Sabatelli =

Italian painter

Francesco Sabatelli (February 22, 1803 – August, 1830) was an Italian painter.

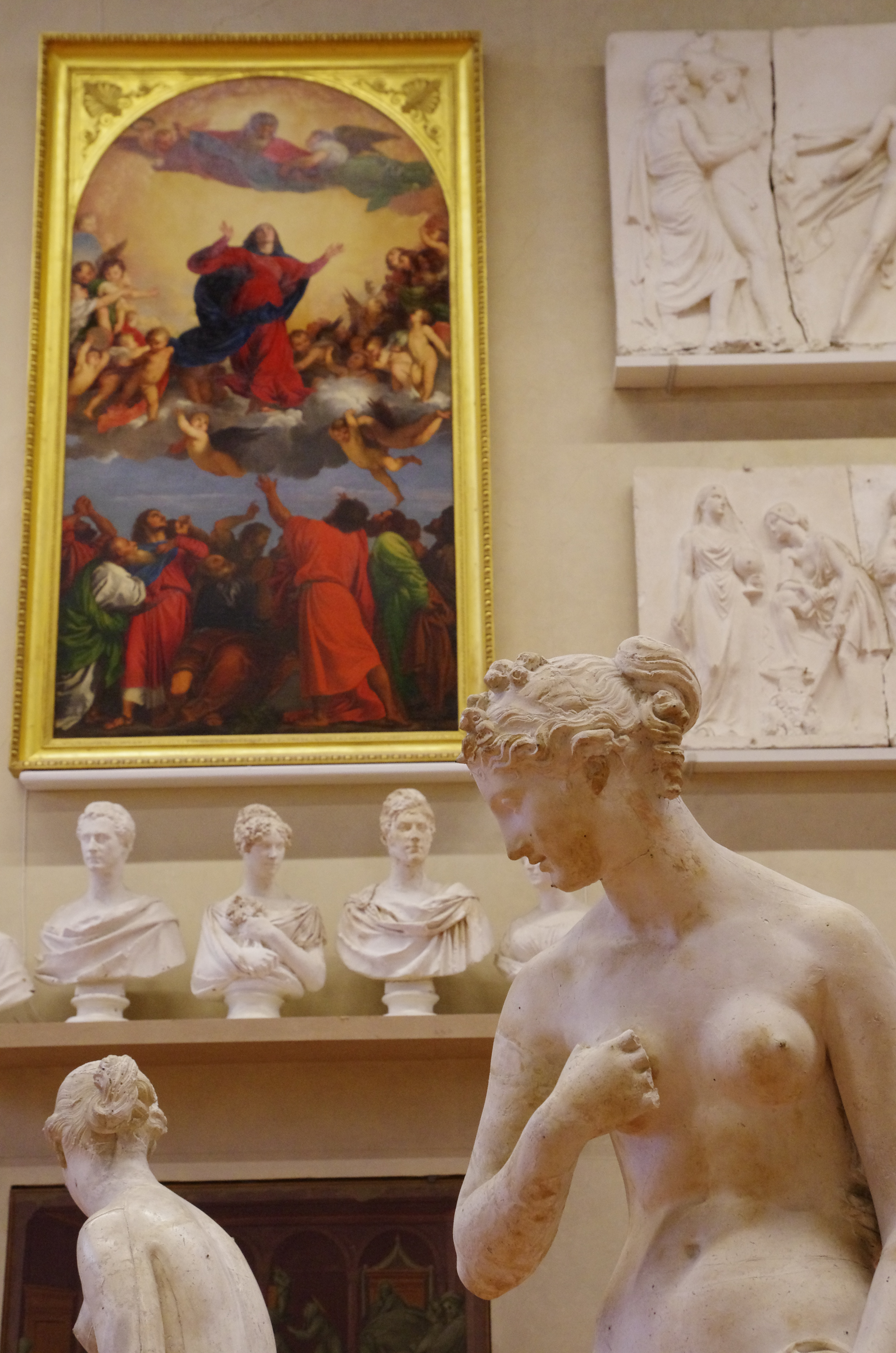
Francesco Sabatelli copy from Assumption of the Virgin (Titian), Galleria dell'Accademia

Born at Florence, he first trained with his father, the Milanese painter Luigi Sabatelli, then later in Rome and Venice. In 1823, he moved to Florence on the invitation of the government of Leopold II, and became a professor in the Accademia di Belle Arti. His younger brother, Giuseppe Sabatelli (1813–1843), later also served as a professor in the Accademia in Florence.

Among his works were Pier Capponi che lacera i turpi capitoli, Joseph sold by brothers at the cistern of Dothai, and Creation of the Soul.

When his father Luigi left Milan to paint the Salone dell'Iliade (Hall of the Illiad) at the Pitti Palace in Florence, it was his younger son, Francesco, who helped him in this work. When Leopoldo Medici saw the work, he awarded a stipend for Francesco to study in Rome and Venice

Francesco went to paint a lunette in the hall where his father had worked, painting Hector che arsa una nave greca e cosi adempiuto il decreto dei fati, viene da Aiace Talamonio costretto a indietreggiare.

In Venice he made a copy of Titian's Assumption of the Virgin. He also made a sketch of the Hayez canvas depicting a scene from the end of The Count of Carmagnola by Manzoni and designed for the church of Santa Croce the canvas of Sant'Antonio resurrects the dead, finished by his younger brother Giuseppe.

He died while painting Ajax the lesser tries to save himself from the storm, and spiteful of the gods, dies in his arms of his father Oileus. Like his brother, he died of tuberculosis (pulmonary phthisis). He died at Milan.
