= Giuseppe Penuti =

Italian painter

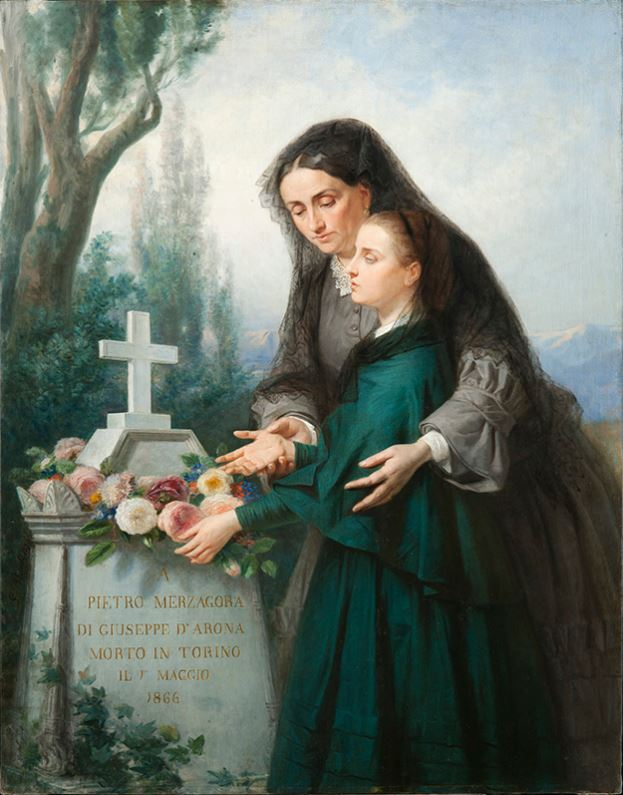
Allegory in Memory of the Merchant, Pietro Merzagora (1867)

Giuseppe Penuti (1810 –1877) was an Italian painter of the Neoclassic period, active in Milan and known best for his portraits, although he also painted history, vedute, and genre subjects. During his last decade, he also created some studies of animals.

== Biography ==
He studied in his native city of Milan at the Brera Academy under Luigi Sabatelli. He presented his first works in 1833, in Milan, and exhibited until 1876.

Among his works:

- Ottone Visconti che mostra l’elmo fregiato d'una biscia (1833), Milan
- Portrait of the Engraver Giuseppe Ripamonti, Galleria d'Arte Moderna, Milan
- La Venezia (allegory) exhibited in 1861 in Milan
- Un fremito di libertà exhibited in 1867 in Bologna
- Lo steccato dei daini nel giardino pubblico di Milano exhibited in 1869 in Turin
- Il ritorno della greggia-effetto di tramonto exhibited in 1876 in Milan
