= Leonetto Tintori =

Italian artist

Leonetto Tintori (1908 - 2000) was an artist (painter and sculptor) in varied media, who pursued various prominent restorations of Renaissance paintings, including frescoes.

He was born in Prato, region of Tuscany, Italy. Facile in multiple media in painting, including oil, tempera, fresco, and pastel; as well as sculpture, including ceramic, bronze, wood, plaster, and wax; as well as decorative arts such as mosaic, stucco, and scagliola. He taught many fresco artists, including David Mayernik.

He performed restorations for works of Giotto, Piero della Francesca, Masaccio, Andrea del Castagno, and others. He helped restore frescoes for the church of Santa Croce in Florence. He has also consulted on the restoration and conservation of paintings in Mayan temples in Mexico and in the Egypt. Together with his wife Elena Berruti, also a painter known in the "Scuola d'Arte e Mestieri Leonardo" in the 1920s, he founded in 1983 the Fresco Laboratory of Vainella in his studio-home in Figline near Prato. He donated the property to the city to maintain as a sculpture garden, museum and school for his craft.
