= Giuseppe Sabatelli =

Italian painter (1813–1843)

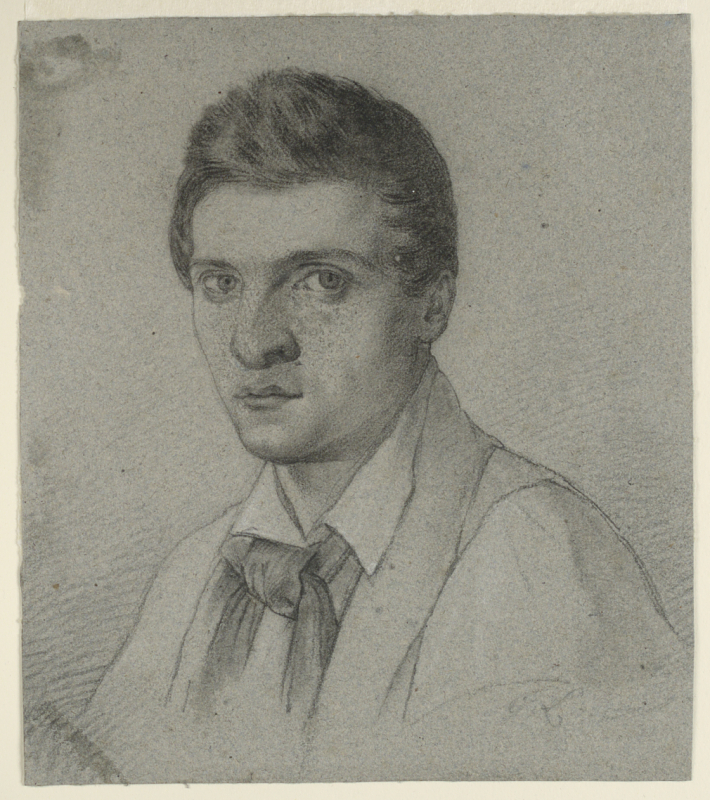
- Born: June 24, 1813; Milan
- Died: February 27, 1843; Florence
- Occupations: Painter, artist

Giuseppe Sabatelli (June 24, 1813 – February 27, 1843) was an Italian painter.

== Biography ==
Born at Milan, he first trained with his father, the prominent painter Luigi Sabatelli, who taught at the Brera Academy.

In 1834, he moved to Florence along with his older brother Francesco (born 1803). In Florence, Giuseppe became a professor in the Accademia di Belle Arti. He painted both historical subjects and portraits.

Among the works of Giuseppe are Christ frees a Possessed Man (Ossesso) (1828); a Joseph recounts dreams for brothers for the church of Santa Croce; and a Miracle of Sant Antonio (1832) for a church in Rimini.

Despite trying to avoid painting women, he did paint them in a Saint Filomena for San Francesco in Pisa; a Those of Samuel appears to Saul in the Cave of the Witch of Endor; and Farinata degli Uberti alla battaglia del Serchio for Nioccolo Puccini. In 1836 finished his brother's work, but like his brother also died young from tuberculosis in Florence.
