= Giulio Cesare Arrivabene =

Italian painter (1806–1896)

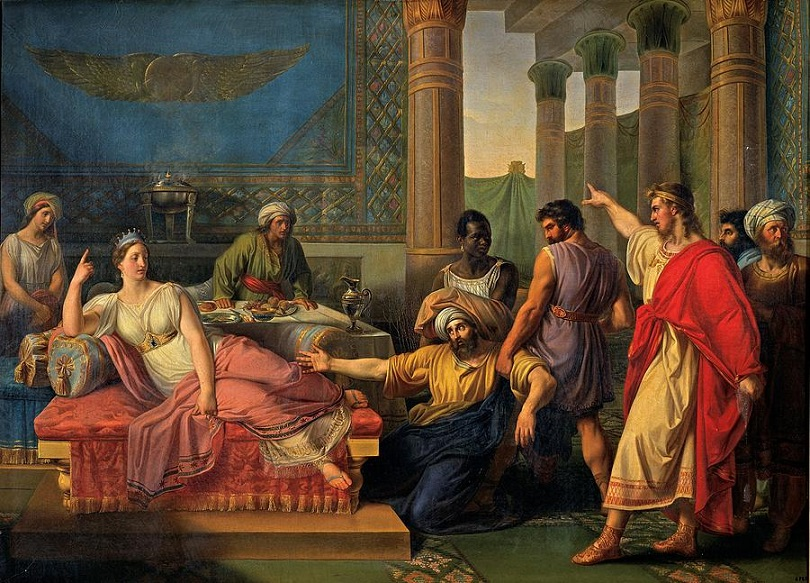
The Punishment of Haman, Palazzo Ducale di Mantova

Giulio Cesare Arrivabene (1806 – 1896) was an Italian painter, active initially in a neoclassical style, mainly painting historic and religious canvases. He also was active as a portraitist.

== Life and work ==
Arrivabene was born in Mantua. He trained under Luigi Sabatelli at the Brera Academy. In 1833, as a student, he produced a sketch titled Haman Kneels Before Esther . In 1845, he participated in the decoration of the Palazzo Torlonia in Rome. He painted a Il divorzio di Enrico VIII (The Divorce of Henry VIII) for the Marchese Ala Ponzone of Milan; and a Cola di Rienzo and Italy at the foot of the Virgin (exhibited in 1850 at Turin). In 1841, he was commissioned by the Savoy Royal family to create a painting depicting the Reconsecration of the Hautecombe Abbey for the Castello di Racconigi.

After 1853, he moved to Florence, and obtained many commissions from the aristocracy. He painted a Henry IV at Canossa (Accademia Nazionale Virgiliana, Mantua), Apotheosis of San Leonardo (Apse of church of San Leonardo, Mantua), and Imelda de' Lambertazzi (exhibited in 1870 at Parma). His works also include Jesus among the Doctors (church of Sant'Egidio (Mantua)) and St Anthony of Padua scolds Ezzelino da Romano (1846, Sant'Andrea, Mantua). The parish church of Sustinente, dedicated to San Michele Arcangelo, has a St Michael Archangel and a St Lucia and Filomena by him. Arrivabene died in 1896 in Florence.

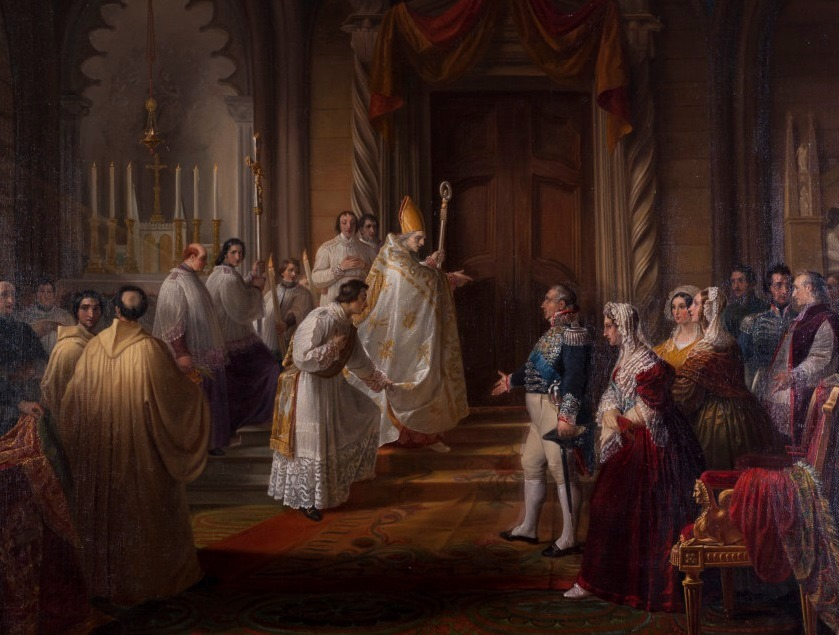
Rededication of Hautecombe Abbey
