= Felice Sabatelli =

Italian astronomer

- Born: 1710; Melfi, Italy
- Died: 9 July 1786 (aged 75–76); Naples, Italy
- Scientific career
- Fields: Astronomy, Mathematics
- Institutions: University of Naples, Royal Navy Academy, Royal Pages College

Signature
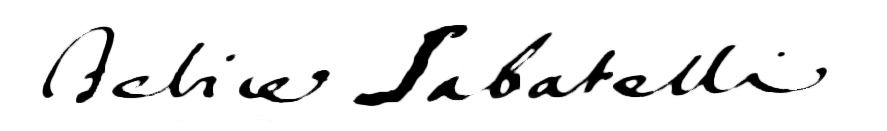

Felice Sabatelli (1710 - 9 July 1786) was an Italian astronomer, professor of astronomy and nautical sciences at the University of Naples.

He was born in Melfi, from about 1737 he became a pupil of Pietro Di Martino at the University of Naples. A few years later he went to the Bologna Observatory collaborating with Eustachio Manfredi and Eustachio Zanotti.

With the premature death of Di Martino, in 1746, he obtained the Astronomy and Nautical chair of the University of Naples. In addition, he taught mathematics and astronomy at the Navy Academy and mathematics and philosophy at the Royal Pages College.

Among the main protagonists of the scientific circle set up in the sumptuous palace of Prince Ferdinando Spinelli di Tarsia, in 1749 he realized a sundial in the imposing library of the prince.

In 1750 he proposed to Charles of Bourbon to set up an astronomical observatory in Naples after the first two established in Italy in Bologna and Pisa, suggesting the hill of Pizzofalcone. In 1768 he presented a new proposal to Ferdinand IV indicating some rooms of the suppressed Jesuit college.

In 1751 he perfected the measurement of the latitude of Naples previously made by Pietro di Martino in the monastery of SS. Severino and Sossio, today's State Archives of Naples. He was in correspondence with the Paris astronomer Joseph-Nicolas Delisle to whom he sent the data of the observation of the transit of Mercury on the Sun in 1753.

He was buried in the Archconfraternity of the SS. Rosario in the Quartieri Spagnoli, close to the church of the Rosariello di Palazzo.

He was a Pensioner Member of the Academy of Sciences and Fine Letters of Naples.
