= Luigi Sabatelli =

Italian painter (1772–1850)

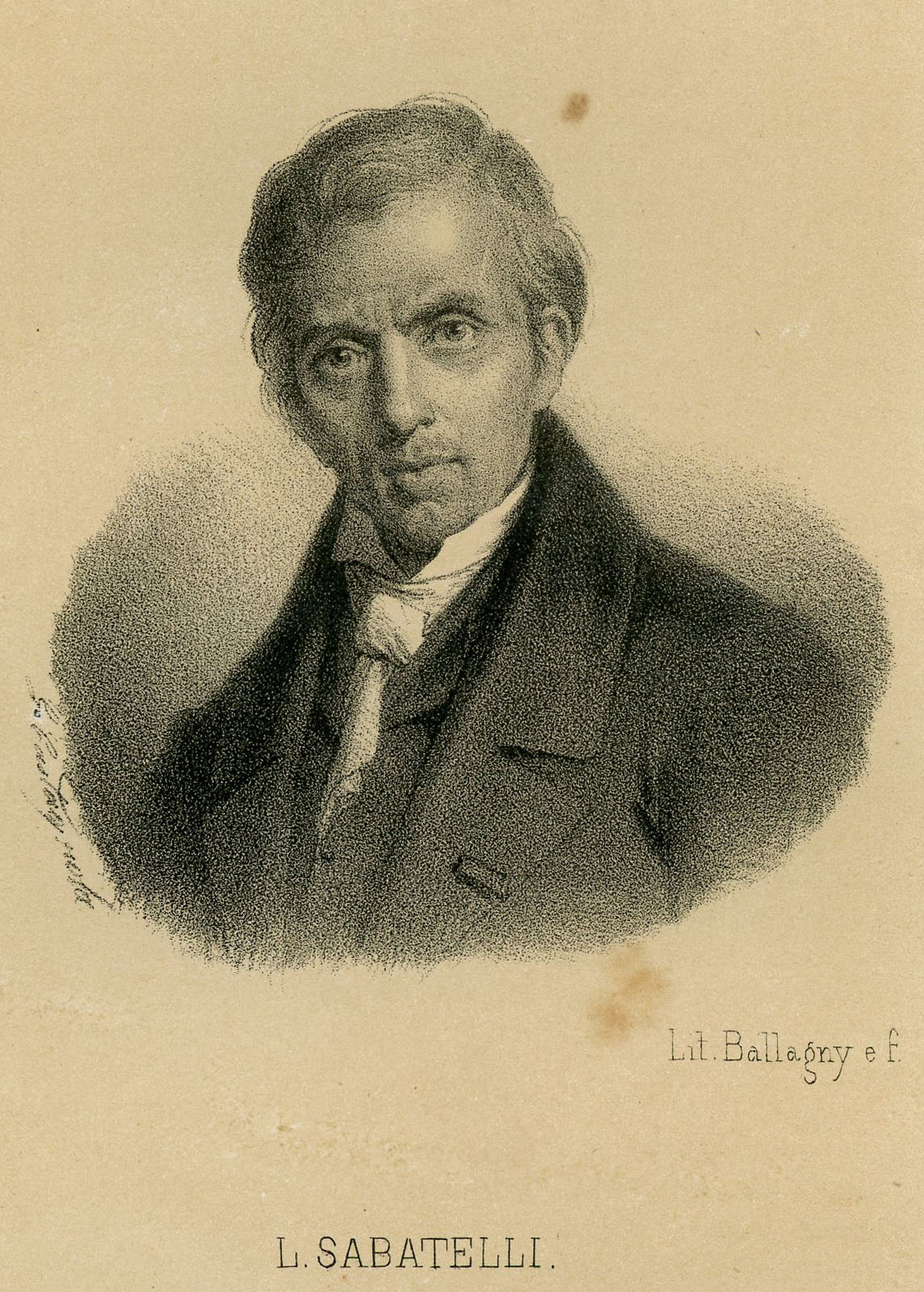
Luigi Sabatelli; posthumous portrait by Gabriele Castagnola

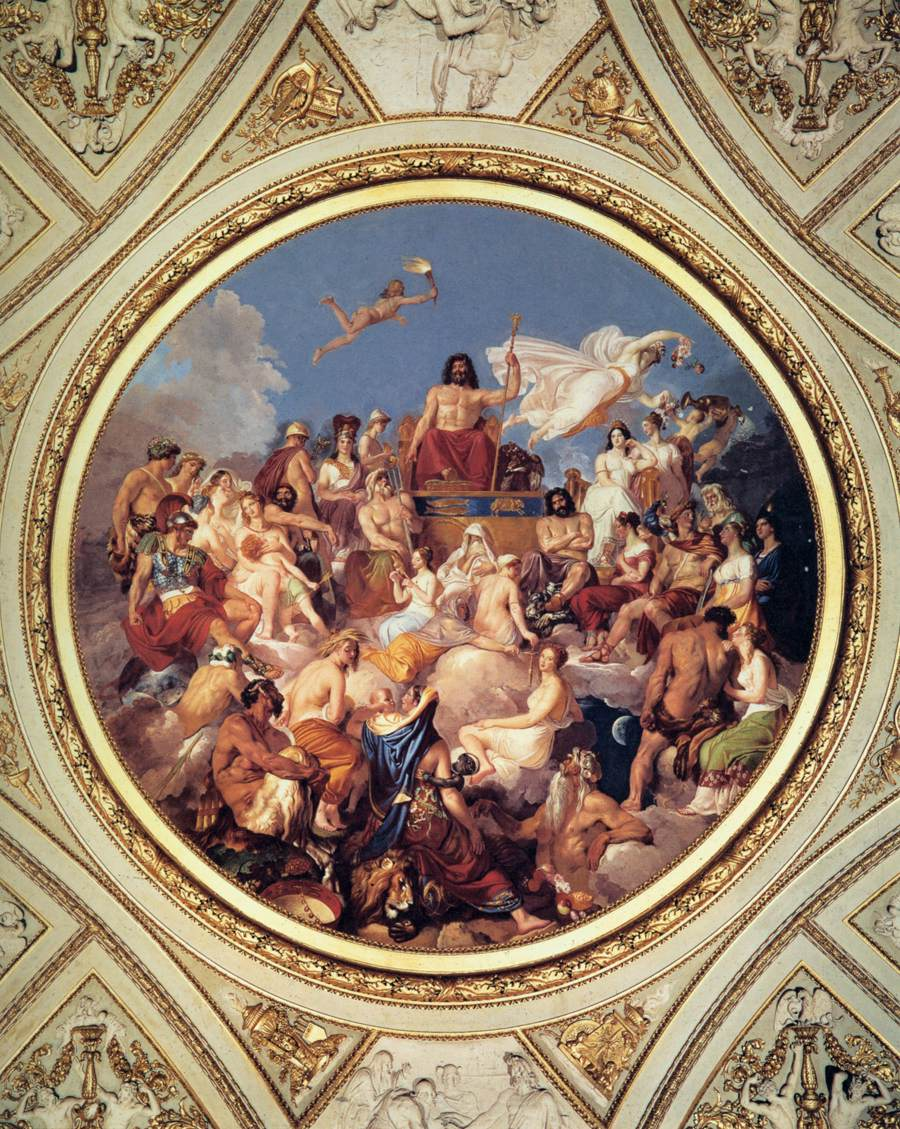
Mount Olympus, Hall of the Iliad, Palatine Gallery

Luigi Sabatelli (21 February 1772 – 29 January 1850) was an Italian painter of the Neoclassic period; active in Milan, Rome, and Florence.

== Biography ==
He was born Florence. He began his studies at the Accademia di Belle Arti di Firenze, where he was taught the Neoclassical style, then completed his studies in Rome. In 1801, he was named a Court Painter for Maria Luisa the Queen of Etruria.

In 1803, with the reorganization of the Brera Academy of Fine Arts of Milan, Sabatelli was named professor of painting, replacing Giulio Traballesi, and held the post until his death.

His first important work in oils was his Meeting of David and Abigail, which now hangs opposite Judith, by Pietro Benvenuti, in the Lady Chapel of Arezzo Cathedral. His reputation, however, rests largely on the frescoes in the "Hall of the Iliad", part of the Palatine Gallery at the Pitti Palace, created from 1822 to 1825 for his patron Maria Luisa, who was then the Duchess of Lucca. They consist of eight lunettes and a large circular medallion, illustrating scenes from the Homeric poems. It was necessary for him to take a leave of absence from the Academy to complete them.

As well as paintings, he produced engravings. Notably, series depicting the Stations of the Cross and the Apocalypse. His depiction of "The Plague of Florence", a scene from the Decameron of Boccaccio, was also well known.

He was a Knight in the Order of Saint Joseph of the Grand Duchy of Tuscany, and was awarded the Great Gold Medal of the Kingdom of Lombardy–Venetia.

Four of his ten children became painters and art teachers: Francesco (1803–1830), Giuseppe (1813–1843), Luigi Maria (1818–1899), and Gaetano (1820–1893). Among his pupils were Carlo Arienti, Giuseppe Sogni, Giuseppe Penuti, Michelangelo Fumagalli, Giulio Cesare Arrivabene and Alessandro Durini.

Sabatelli died in Milan in 1850. A street in Milan has been named after him.

== Sources ==
- Rollins Willard, Ashton (1900). History of Modern Italian Art. London: Longmans, Green & co. pp. 282.
