= Santa Croce, Florence =

Franciscan church in Florence, Italy

Basilica of the Holy Cross
- Basilica di Santa Croce (Italian)
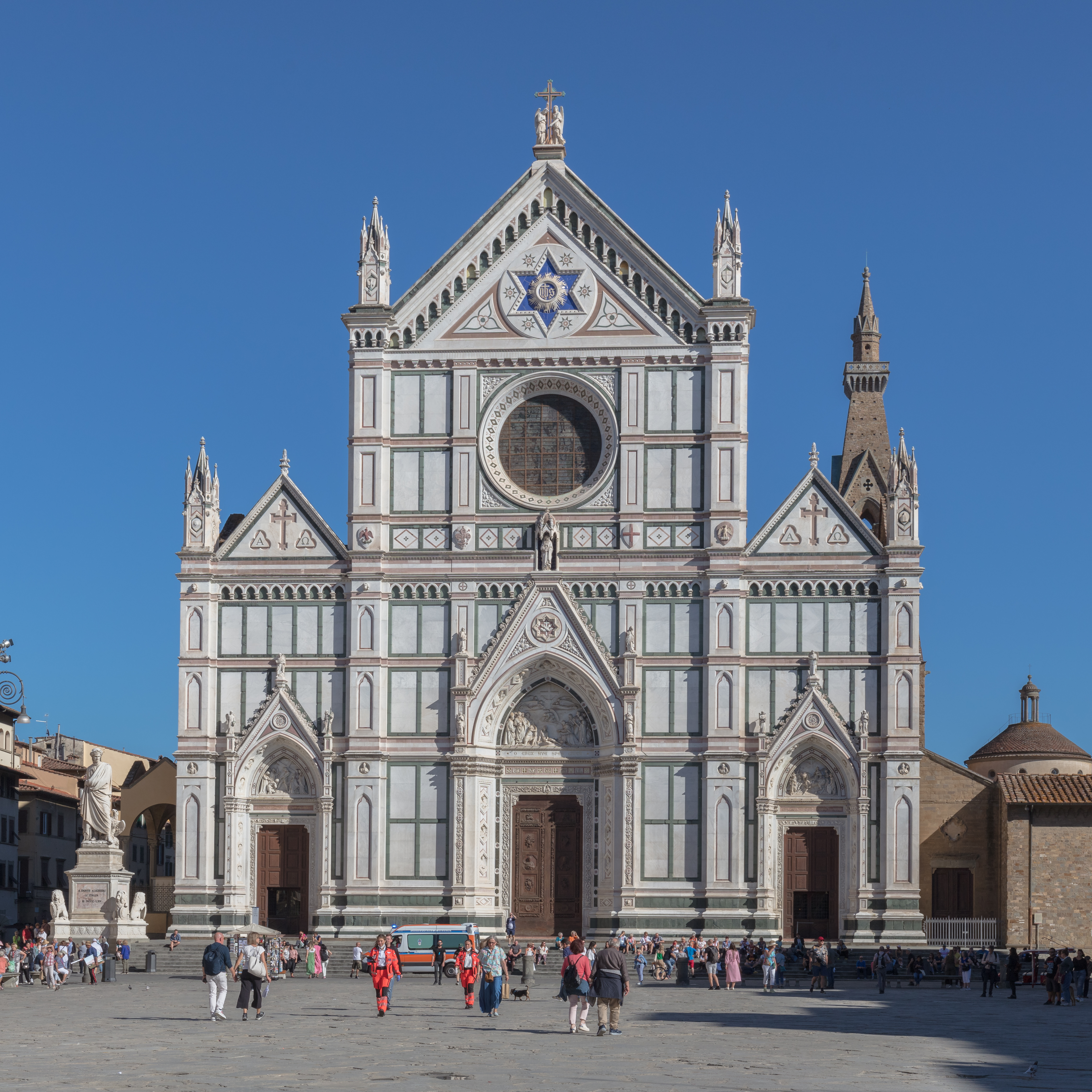
- Façade of Santa Croce, September 2022

- Location in Florence
- 43°46′6.3″N 11°15′45.8″E
- Location: Florence, Tuscany
- Country: Italy
- Denomination: Catholic Church
- Sui iuris church: Latin Church
- Religious order: Order of Friars Minor

History
- Status: Minor basilica Conventual church
- Consecrated: 1443

Architecture
- Architectural type: Church
- Style: Gothic, Renaissance, Gothic Revival
- Groundbreaking: 1294–1295
- Completed: 1385

Administration
- Archdiocese: Archdiocese of Florence

The Basilica di Santa Croce (Italian for 'Basilica of the Holy Cross') is a minor basilica and the principal Franciscan church of Florence, Italy. It is situated on the Piazza di Santa Croce, about 800 metres (2,600 ft) southeast of the Duomo, on what was once marshland beyond the city walls. Being the burial place of notable Italians, including those from the Italian Renaissance such as Michelangelo, Galileo, and Machiavelli, as well as the poet Foscolo, political philosopher Gentile and the composer Rossini, it is also known as the Temple of the Italian Glories (Tempio dell'Itale Glorie).

== Building ==
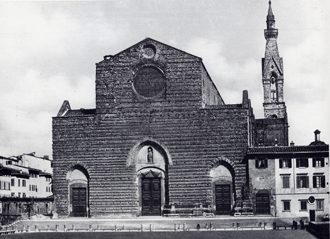
The original brick west front (before the 1860s Gothic Revival embellishments by Niccolò Matas)

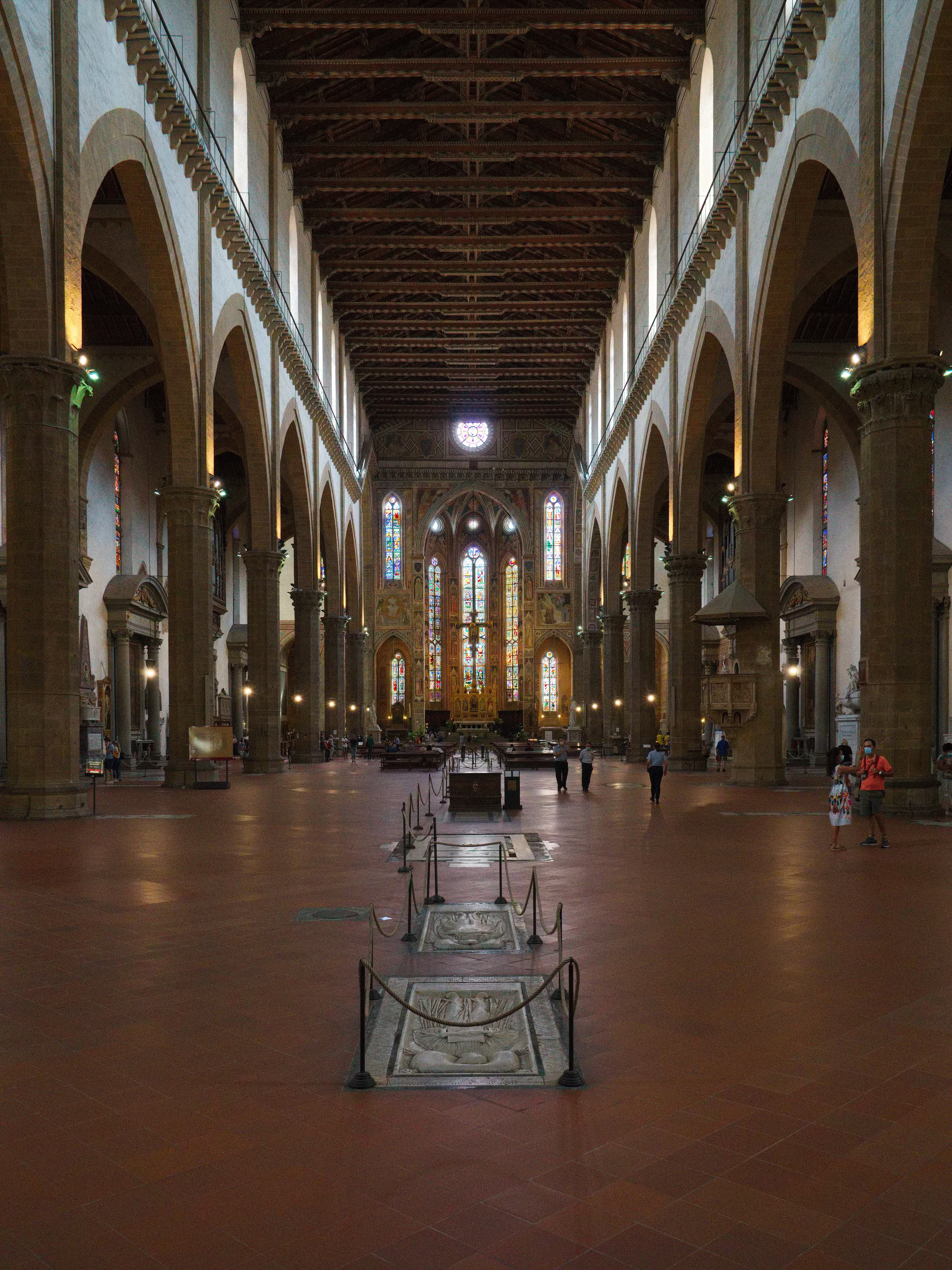
The nave facing east

The basilica is the largest Franciscan church in the world. Its most notable features are its sixteen chapels, many of them decorated with frescoes by Giotto and his pupils, (Note: A 20th-century restoration by Leonetto Tintori revealed that the Peruzzi Chapel scenes were painted in tempera on dry plaster rather than true fresco.) and its tombs and cenotaphs. Legend says that Santa Croce was founded by St Francis himself. The construction of the current church, which replaced an older building, was begun on 12 May 1294, possibly by Arnolfo di Cambio, and paid for by some of the city's wealthiest families. It was consecrated in 1442 by Pope Eugene IV. The building's design reflects the austere approach of the Franciscans. The floorplan is an Egyptian or Tau cross (a symbol of St Francis), 115 metres in length with a nave and two aisles separated by lines of octagonal columns. To the south of the church was a convent, some buildings of which remain.

The Primo Chiostro, the main cloister, houses the Cappella dei Pazzi, built as the chapter house, completed in the 1470s. Filippo Brunelleschi (who had designed and executed the dome of the Duomo) was involved in its design which has remained rigorously simple and unadorned.

In 1560, the choir screen was removed as part of changes arising from the Counter-Reformation and the interior of this area was rebuilt by Giorgio Vasari. As a result, there was damage to the church's decoration and most of the altars previously located on the screen were lost. The Bardi Chapel which contained a cycle of frescoes of the life of St Francis was plastered over, at the behest of Cosimo I, and Vasari placed some new altars against the walls, causing considerable damage to the frescoes.

The bell tower was built in 1842, replacing an earlier one damaged by lightning. The neo-Gothic marble façade dates from 1857 to 1863. The Jewish architect Niccolò Matas from Ancona designed the church's façade, working a prominent Star of David into the composition. Matas had wanted to be buried with his peers but because he was Jewish, he was buried under the threshold and honoured with an inscription.

In 1866, the complex became public property, as a part of government suppression of most religious houses, following the wars that gained Italian independence and unity.

During the 19th-century restorations, the 16th-century altars and plaster were removed from the Bardi Chapel, revealing Giotto's frescoes of the Life of St Francis, which include the Death of St. Francis. This painting, missing sections where an altar had been attached to the wall, was heavily restored in the 19th century. These restorations were later removed to reveal those areas which are definitively Giotto's, leaving portions of the painting missing.

The Museo dell'Opera di Santa Croce is housed mainly in the refectory, also off the cloister. A monument to Florence Nightingale stands in the cloister, in the city in which she was born and after which she was named. Brunelleschi also built the inner cloister, completed in 1453.

In 1940, during the safe hiding of various works during World War II, Ugo Procacci noticed the Badia Polyptych being carried out of the church. He reasoned that this had been removed from the Badia Fiorentina during the Napoleonic occupation and accidentally re-installed in Santa Croce. Between 1958 and 1961, Leonetto Tintori removed layers of whitewash and overpaint from Giotto's Peruzzi Chapel scenes to reveal his original work.

In 1966, the Arno River flooded much of Florence, including Santa Croce. The water entered the church bringing mud, pollution and heating oil. The damage to buildings and art treasures was severe, taking several decades to repair.

Today the former dormitory of the Franciscan friars houses the Scuola del Cuoio (Leather School). Visitors can watch as artisans craft purses, wallets, and other leather goods which are sold in the adjacent shop.

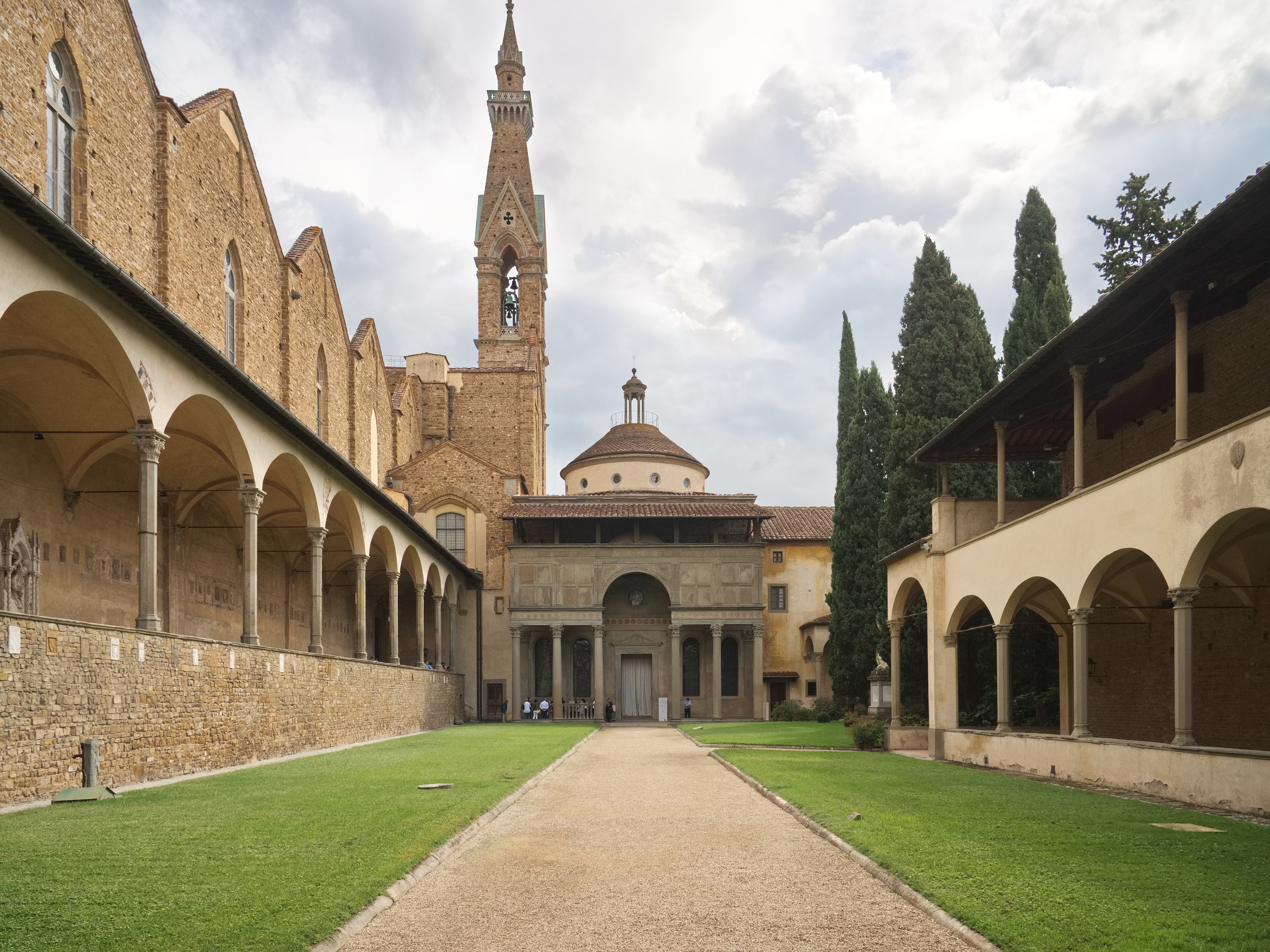
First Cloister with the Cappella dei Pazzi (1440s-1470s)

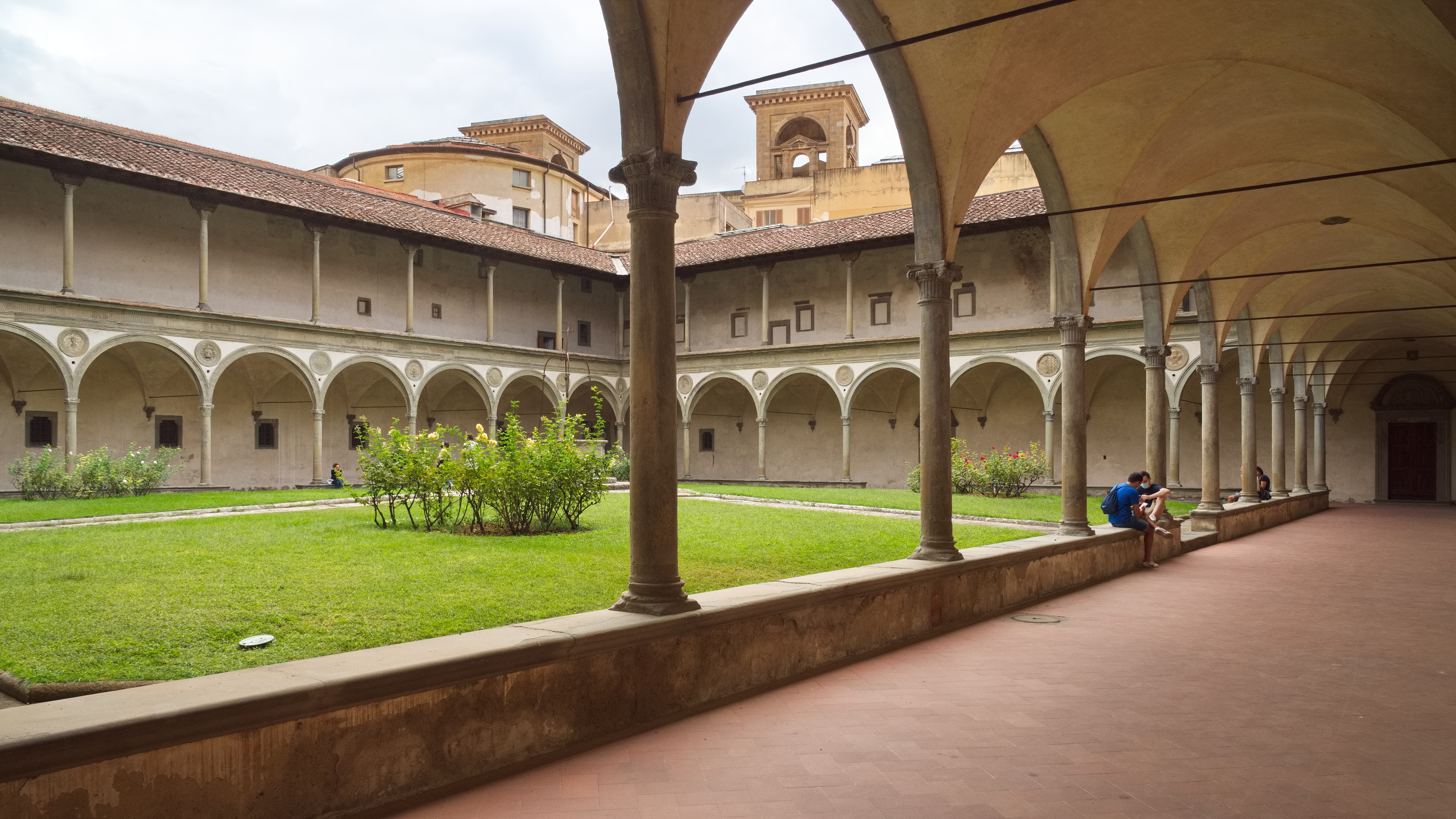
The Greater Cloister

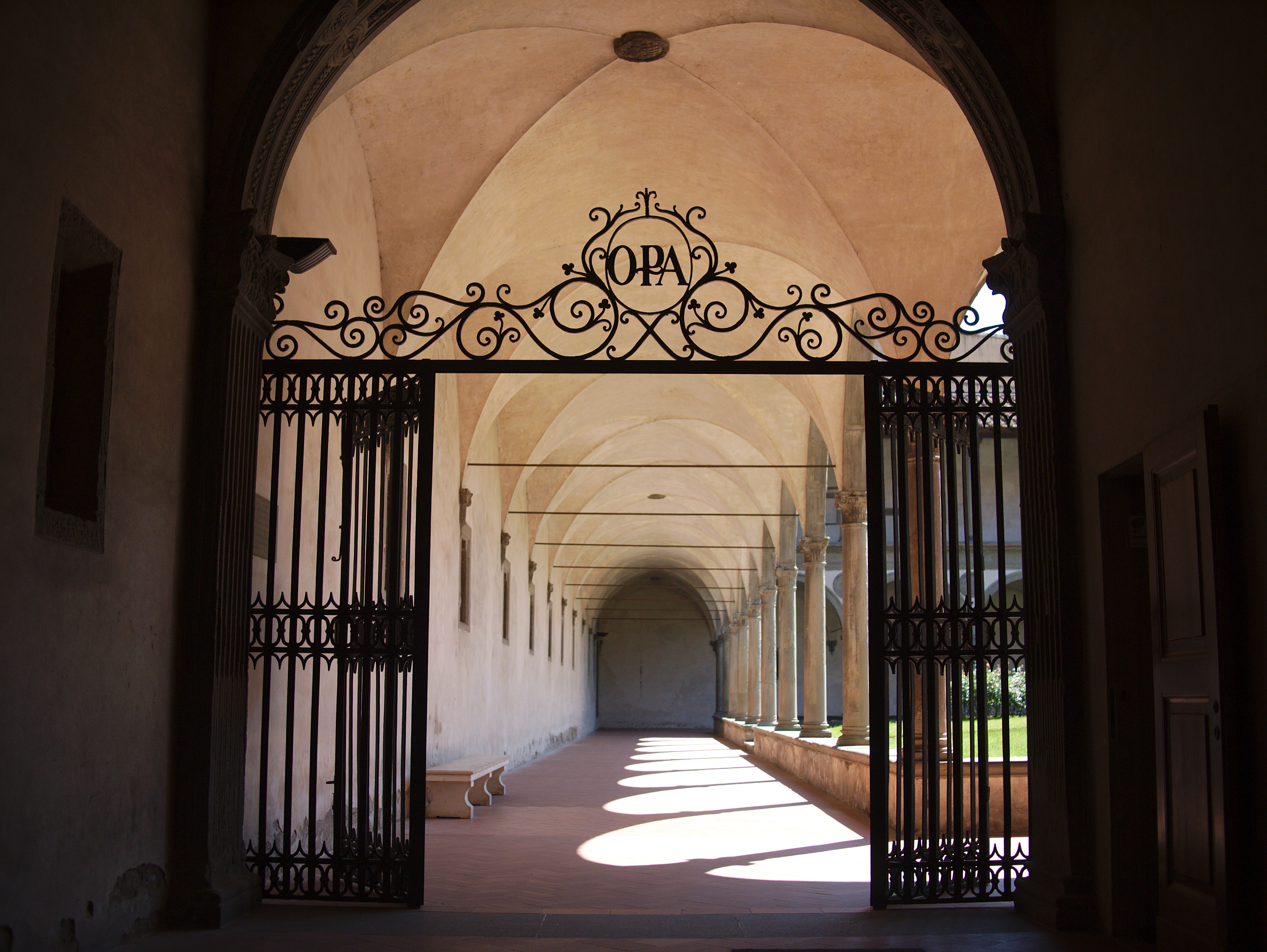
A gate in the gardens with the letters "OPA" for ora pro animis ("pray for souls")

=== Restoration ===
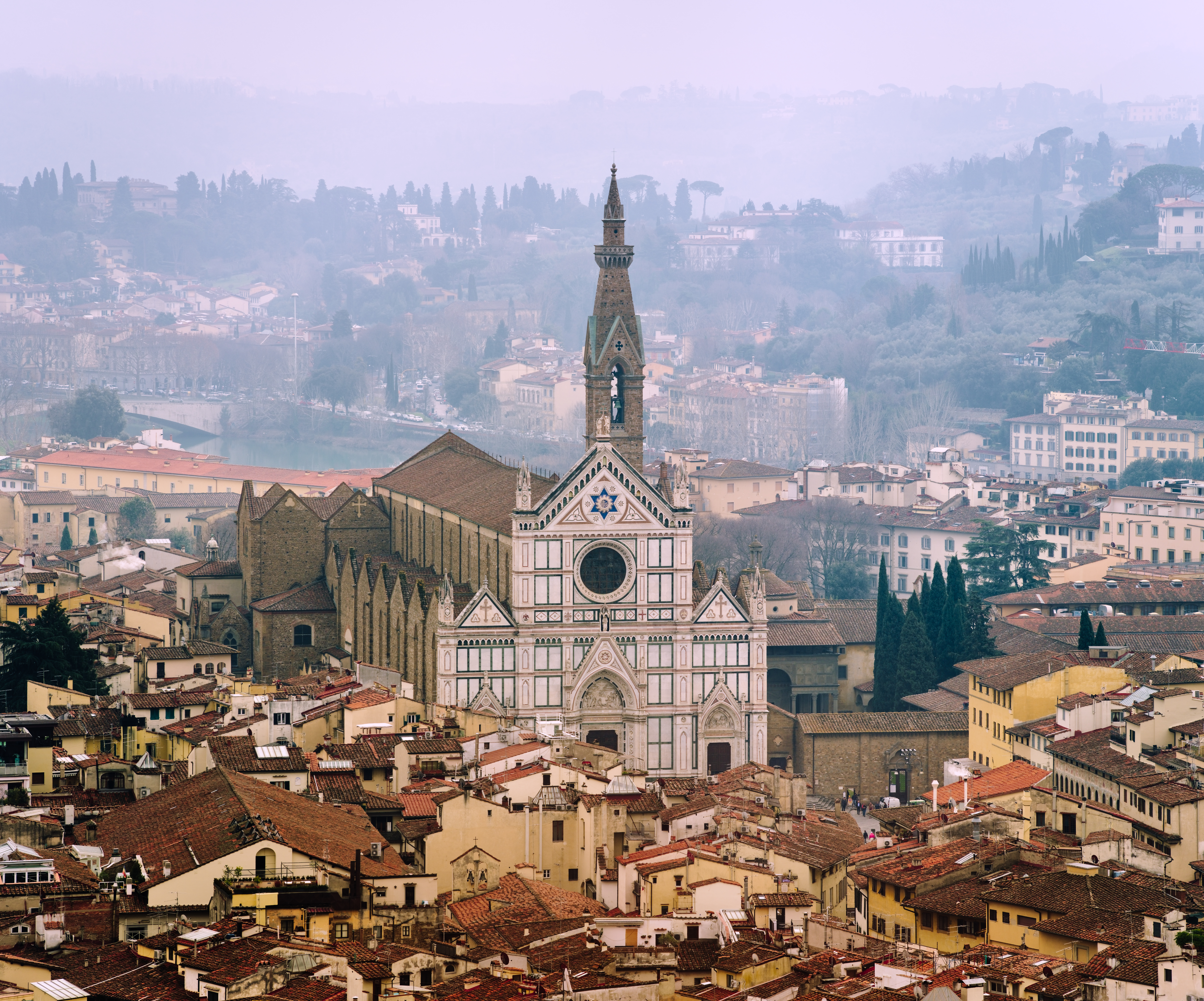
The basilica viewed in 2023 from Giotto's Campanile.

The basilica has been undergoing a multi-year restoration program with assistance from Italy's civil protection agency. On 20 October 2017, the property was closed to visitors due to falling masonry which caused the death of a tourist from Spain. The basilica was closed temporarily during a survey of the stability of the church. The Italian Ministry of Culture said that "there will be an investigation by magistrates to understand how this dramatic fact happened and whether there are responsibilities over maintenance."

== Art ==
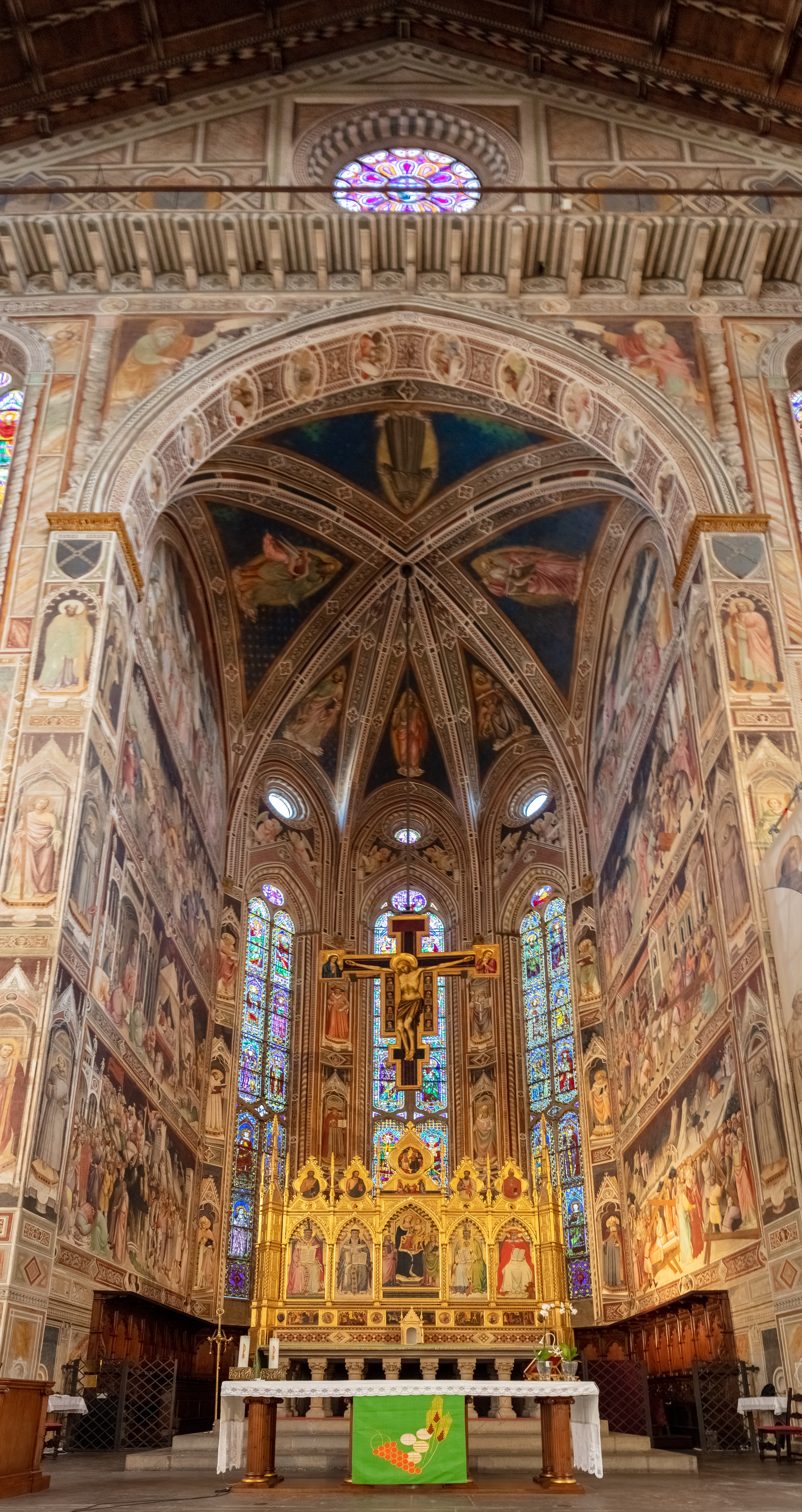
The apse with the fresco cycle by Agnolo Gaddi, the high altar and the crucifix

Artists whose work is present in the church include (for funerary monuments and stained-glass windows see below):

- Benedetto da Maiano: pulpit; with his brother Giuliano: doors to Cappella dei Pazzi
- Cimabue: Crucifix, badly damaged by the 1966 flood and now in the refectory
- Andrea della Robbia: altarpiece in Cappella Medici
- Luca della Robbia: glazed terracotta decoration of Cappella dei Pazzi
- Desiderio da Settignano: frieze in Cappella dei Pazzi
- Donatello: Cavalcanti Annunciation on the south wall; crucifix in the lefthand Cappella Bardi di Vernio; St Louis of Toulouse in the refectory (originally made for Orsanmichele)
- Agnolo Gaddi: fresco cycle of The Legend of the True Cross in the apse with stained glass windows designed by him (1385–1387); fresco decoration of the Cappella Castellani with scenes of the lives of SS Anthony the Great, John the Baptist, John the Evangelist and Nicholas (1385)
- Taddeo Gaddi: frescoes in the Baroncelli Chapel; Crucifixion in the sacristy; Arbor vitae with the Last Supper in the refectory (c. 1330–1340 or 1360), considered his best work
- Giotto: frescoes in Cappella Peruzzi and righthand Cappella Bardi; possibly Coronation of the Virgin, altarpiece in the Baroncelli Chapel, also attributed to Taddeo Gaddi
- Giovanni da Milano: frescoes in Cappella Rinuccini) with Scenes of the Life of the Virgin and the Magdalen
- Maso di Banco: frescoes in Cappella Bardi di Vernio) depicting Scenes from the life of St. Sylvester (1335–1338)
- Henry Moore: statue of a warrior in the Primo Chiostro
- Andrea Orcagna: frescoes largely disappeared during Vasari's remodelling, but some fragments remain in the refectory
- Antonio Rossellino: relief of the Madonna del Latte (1478) in the south aisle
- Santi di Tito: Supper at Emmaus and Resurrection, altarpieces in the north aisle
- Giorgio Vasari: Way to Calvary
- Domenico Veneziano: SS John and Francis in the refectory

Once present in the church's Medici Chapel, but now split between the Florentine Galleries and the Bagatti Valsecchi Museum in Milan, is a polyptych by Lorenzo di Niccolò, whilst the Novitiate Altarpiece by Filippo Lippi and a predella by Pesellino was painted for the church's Novitiate Chapel.

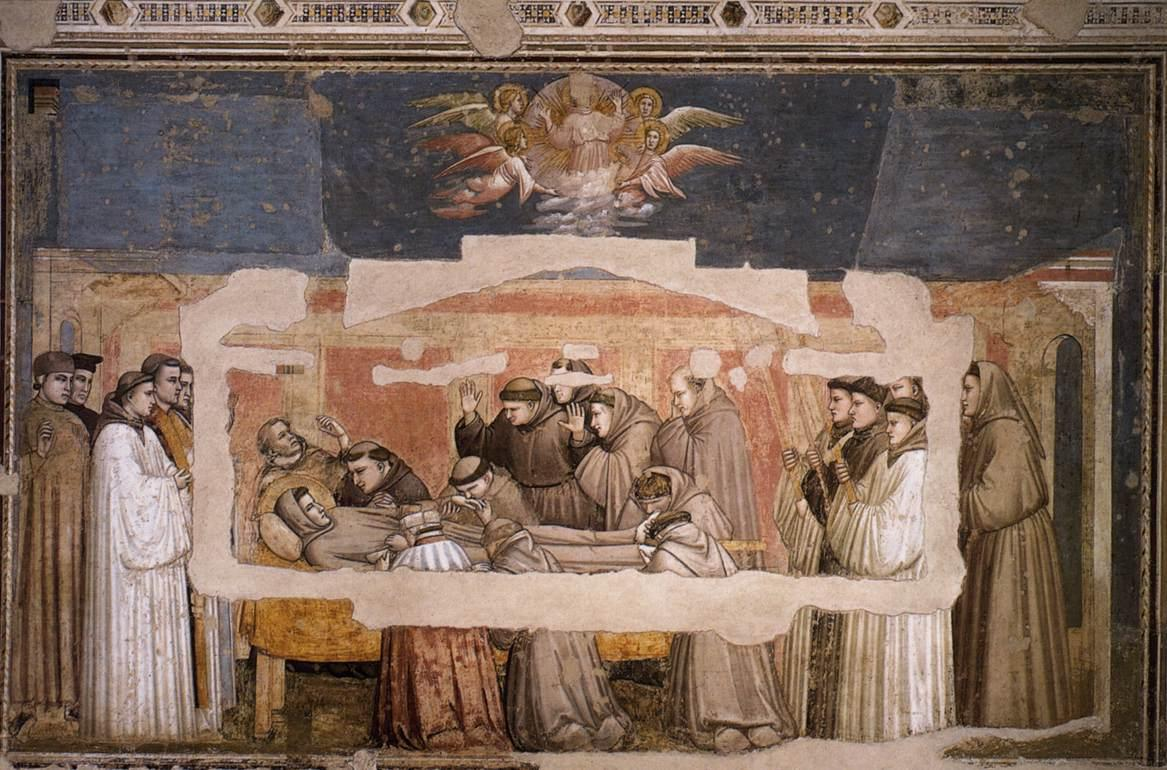
Giotto's Death of St. Francis (early 1320s) with overpainting removed

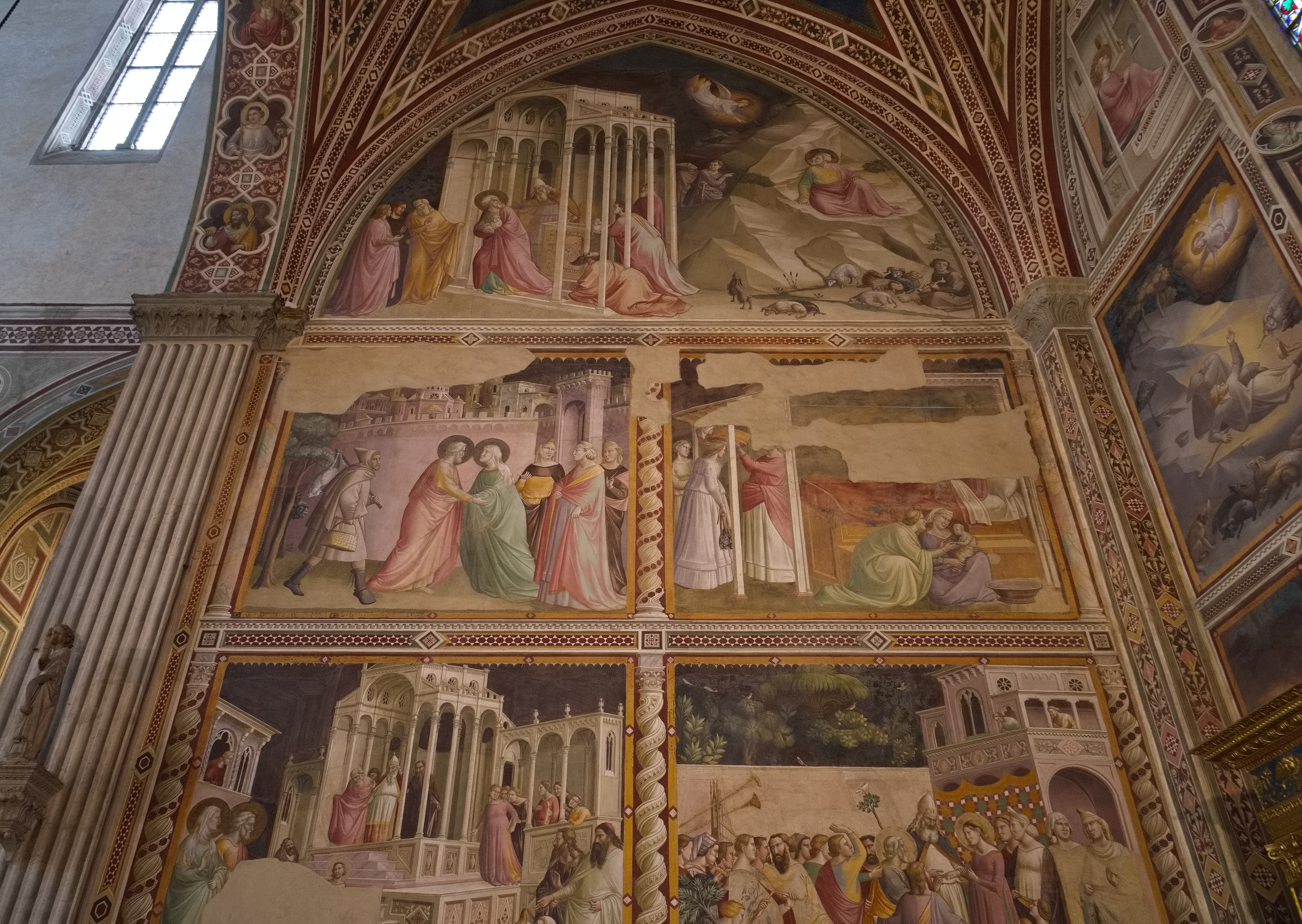
Taddeo Gaddi, Stories of the Virgin (c. 1330), Baroncelli chapel, north wall

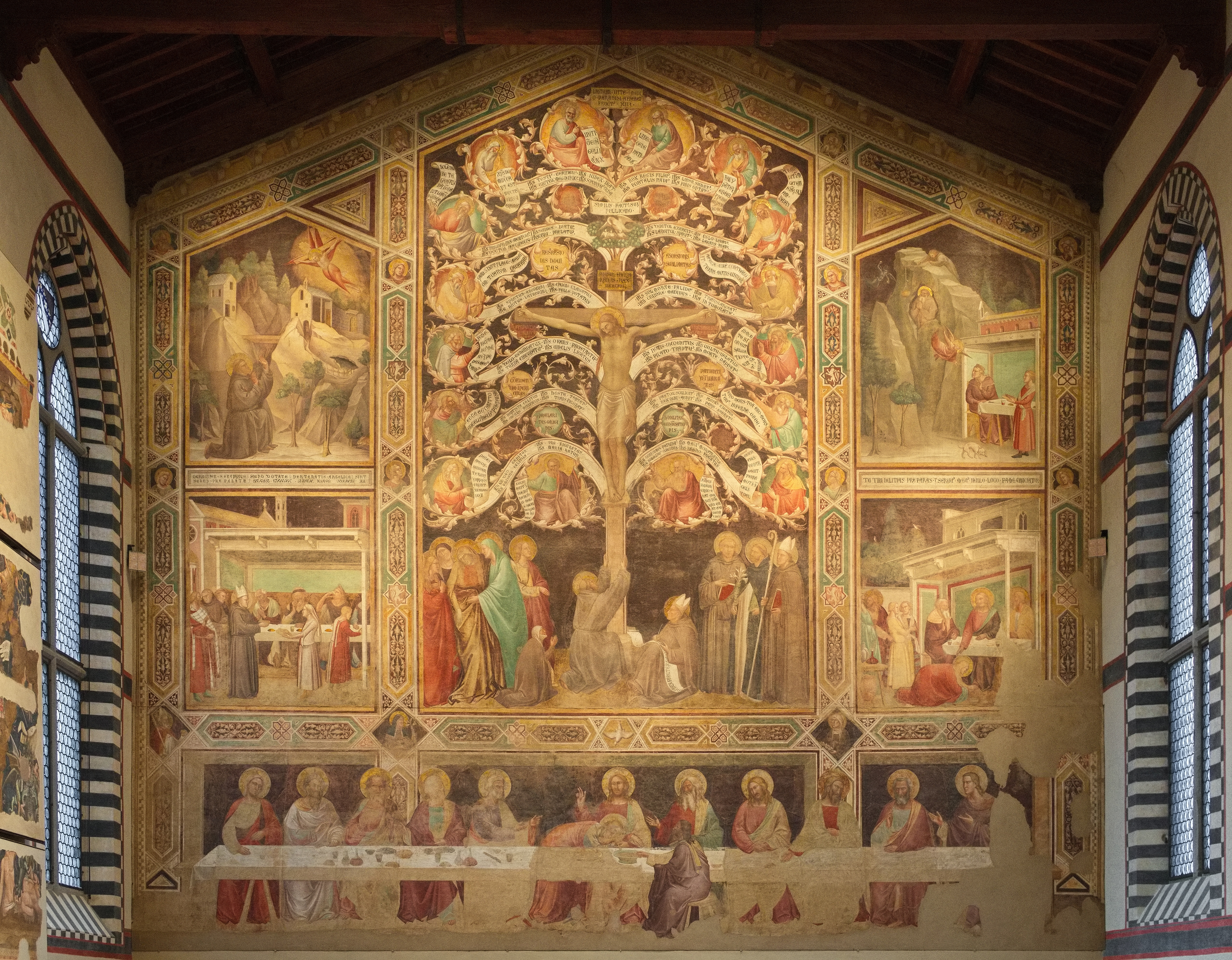
Taddeo Gaddi, Arbor vitae (c. 1330–1340 or 1360), refectory

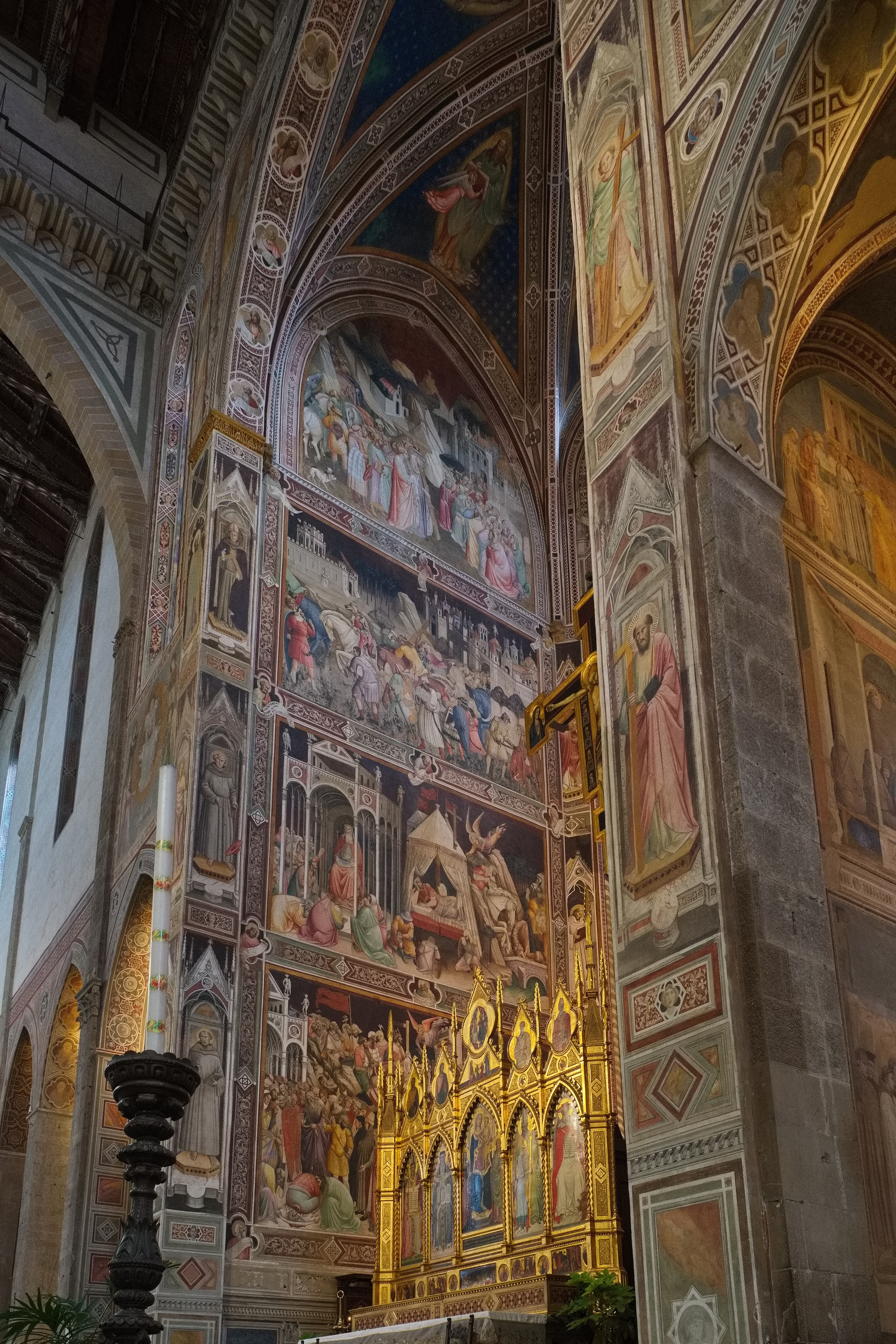
Agnolo Gaddi, Legend of the True Cross (1385–1387), north wall of the apse

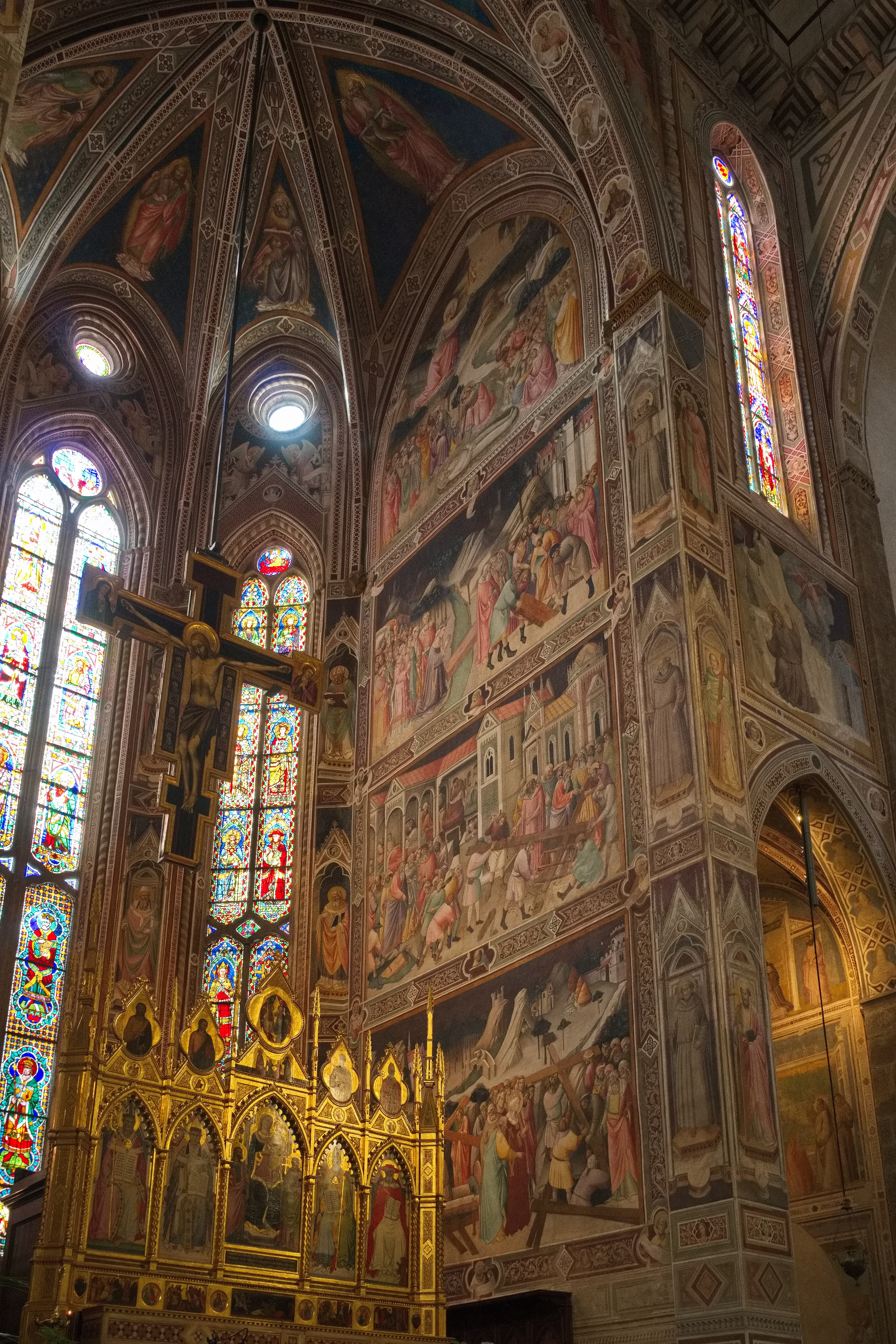
Agnolo Gaddi, Legend of the True Cross (1385–1387), south wall of the apse

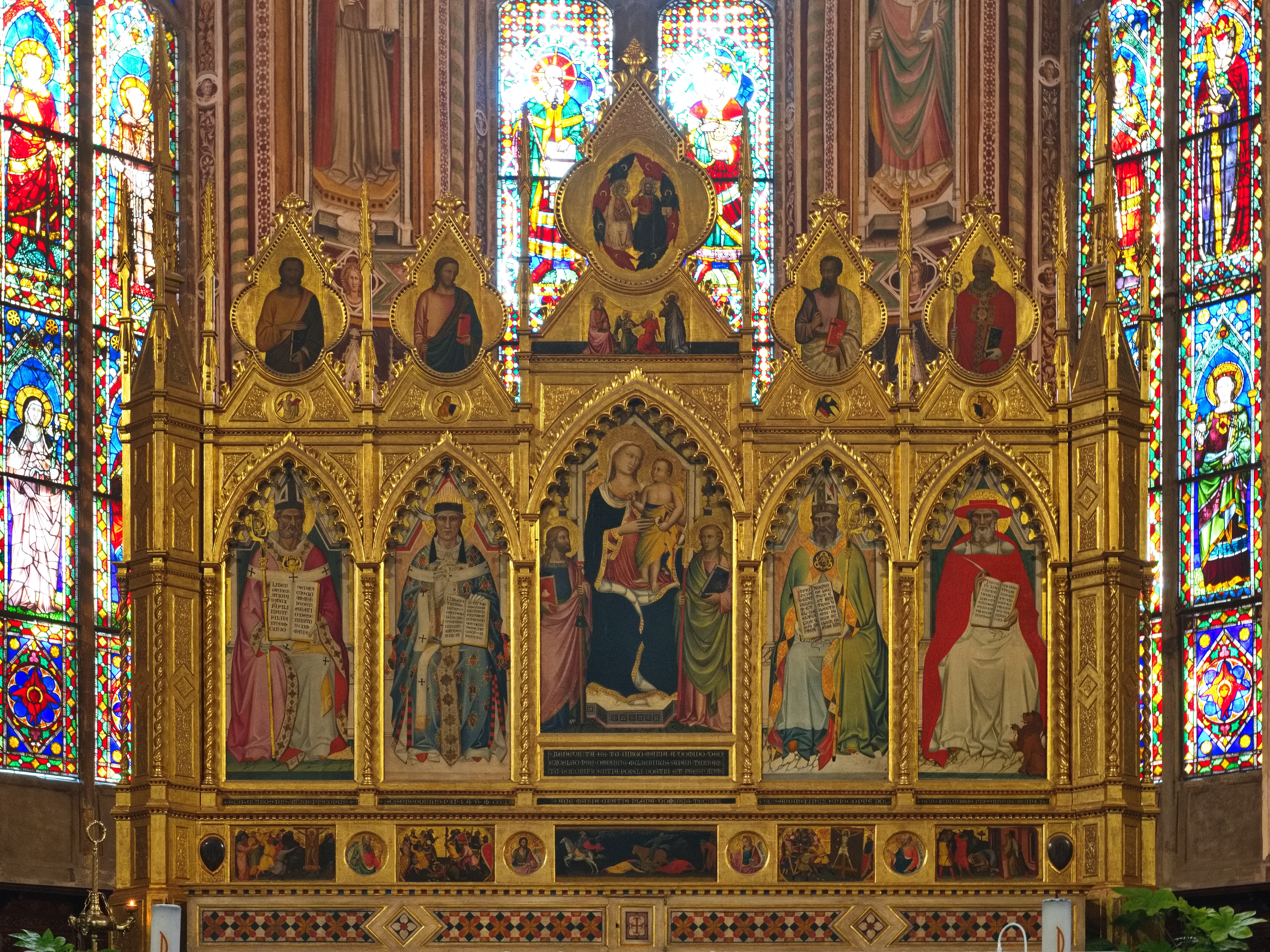
High altar with a Madonna by Niccolò Gerini, and the Doctors of the Church by Giovanni del Biondo and an unknown hand (14th ct.)

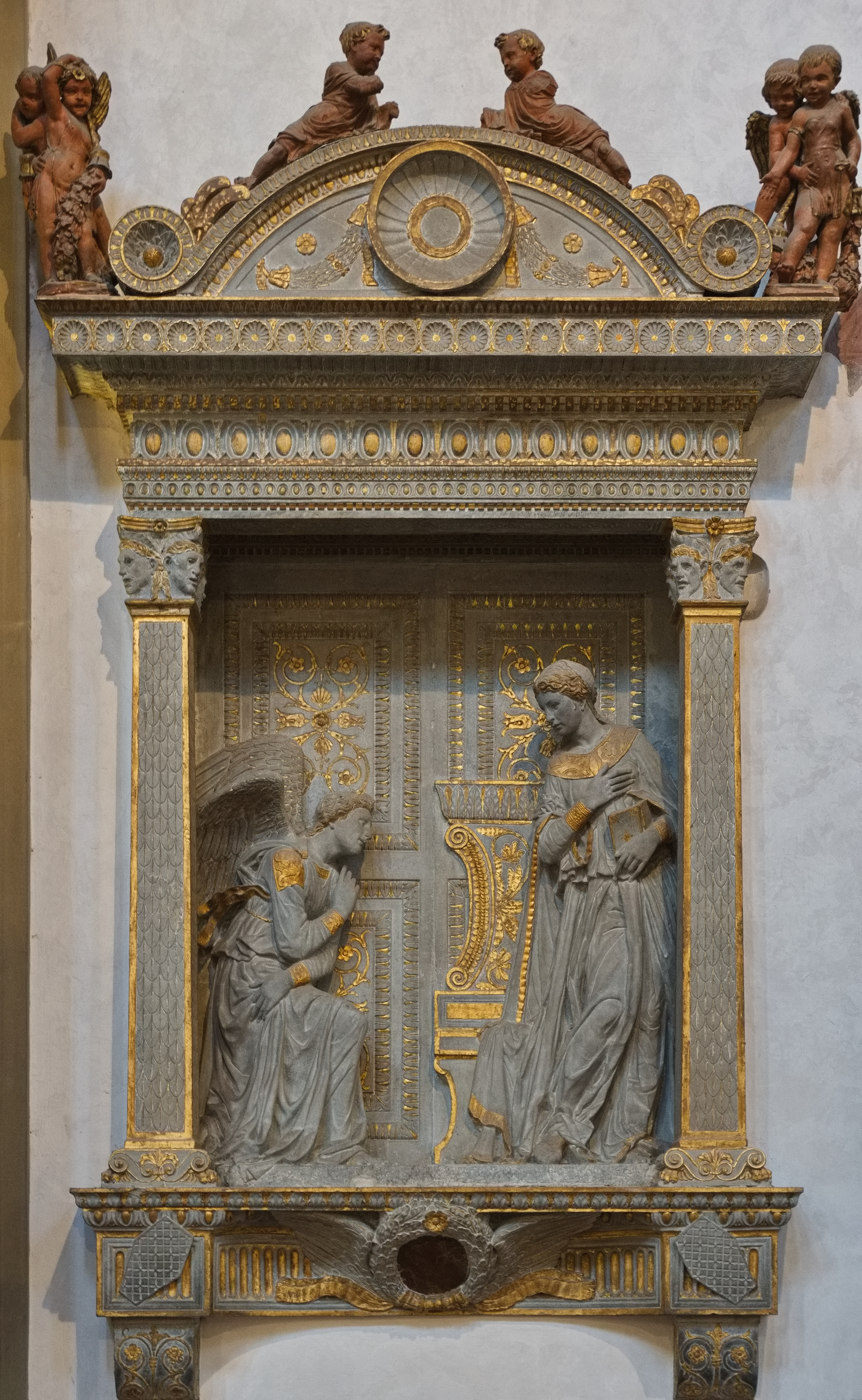
Donatello, Cavalcanti Annunciation (c. 1433–1435)

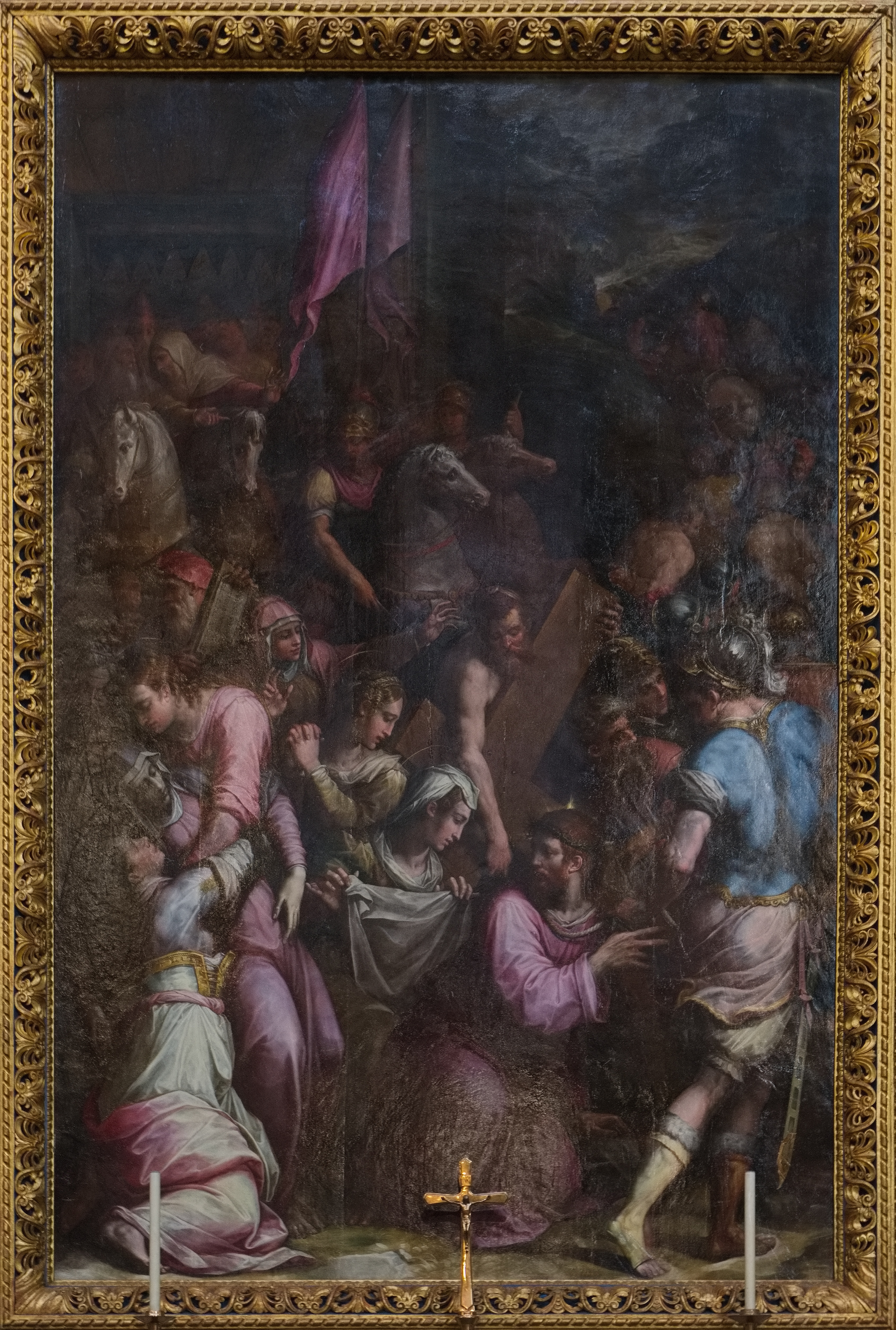
Giorgio Vasari, Way to Calvary and Christ Meeting with Veronica, 1568–1572, Buonarroti altar

== Stained-glass windows ==
Santa Croce also contains some of the earliest stained-glass windows in Florence. In medieval Italy, stained-glass windows were usually designed by a painter and then created by a glazier, an artist with specialized training in the fabrication of stained-glass windows. Many of the private chapels located in the church's transept, as well as the high altar chapel of the church, contain well preserved late 13th- and 14th-century stained-glass windows. There are also several examples of 19th- and 20th-century stained glass in Santa Croce. The windows in and around the high altar chapel include:

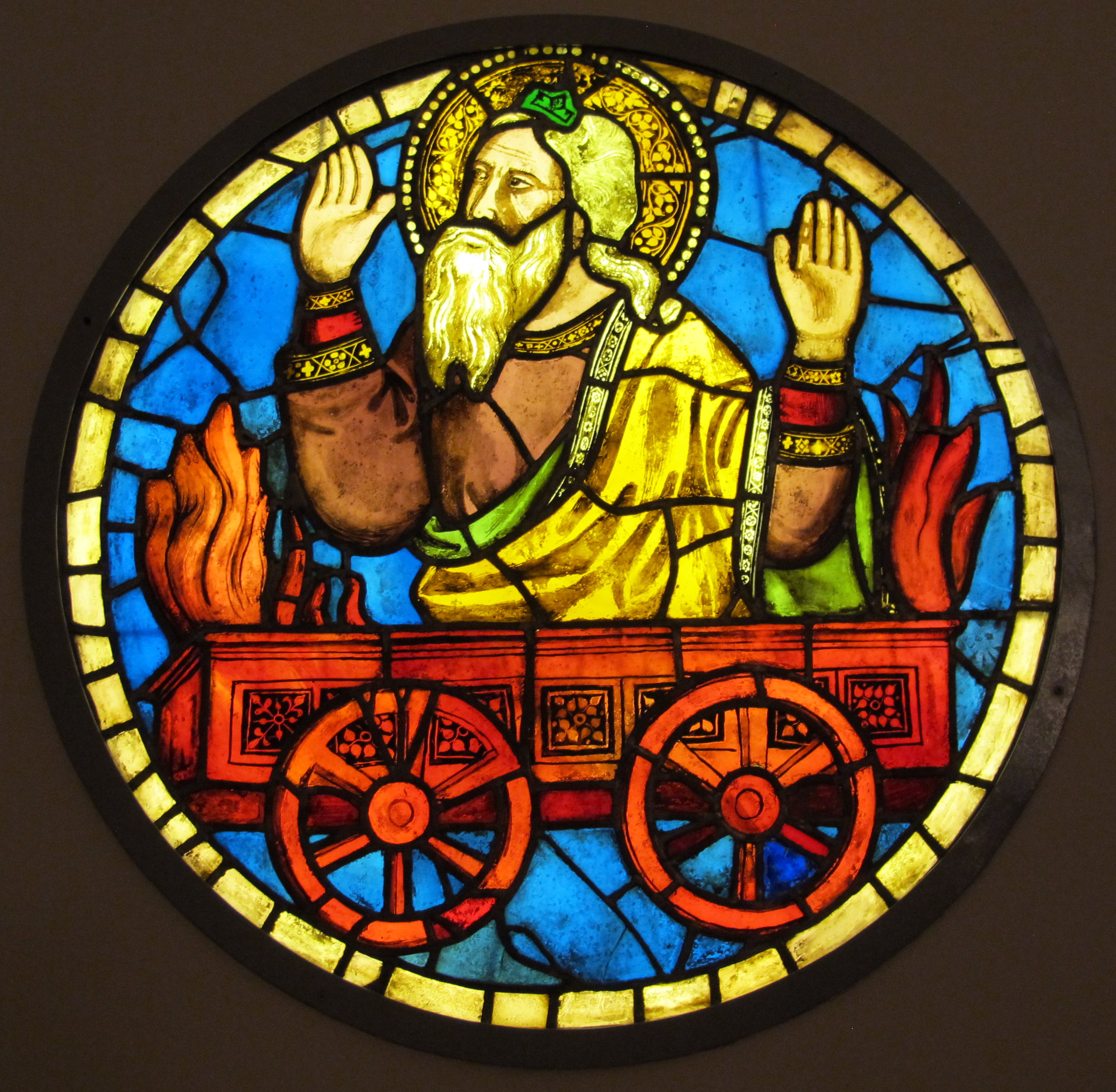
Unknown glazier and Taddeo Gaddi, stained glass roundel depicting Elijah in the Fiery Chariot. Originally located in the top roundel of the right window in the high altar chapel. Currently in the Museum of Santa Croce.

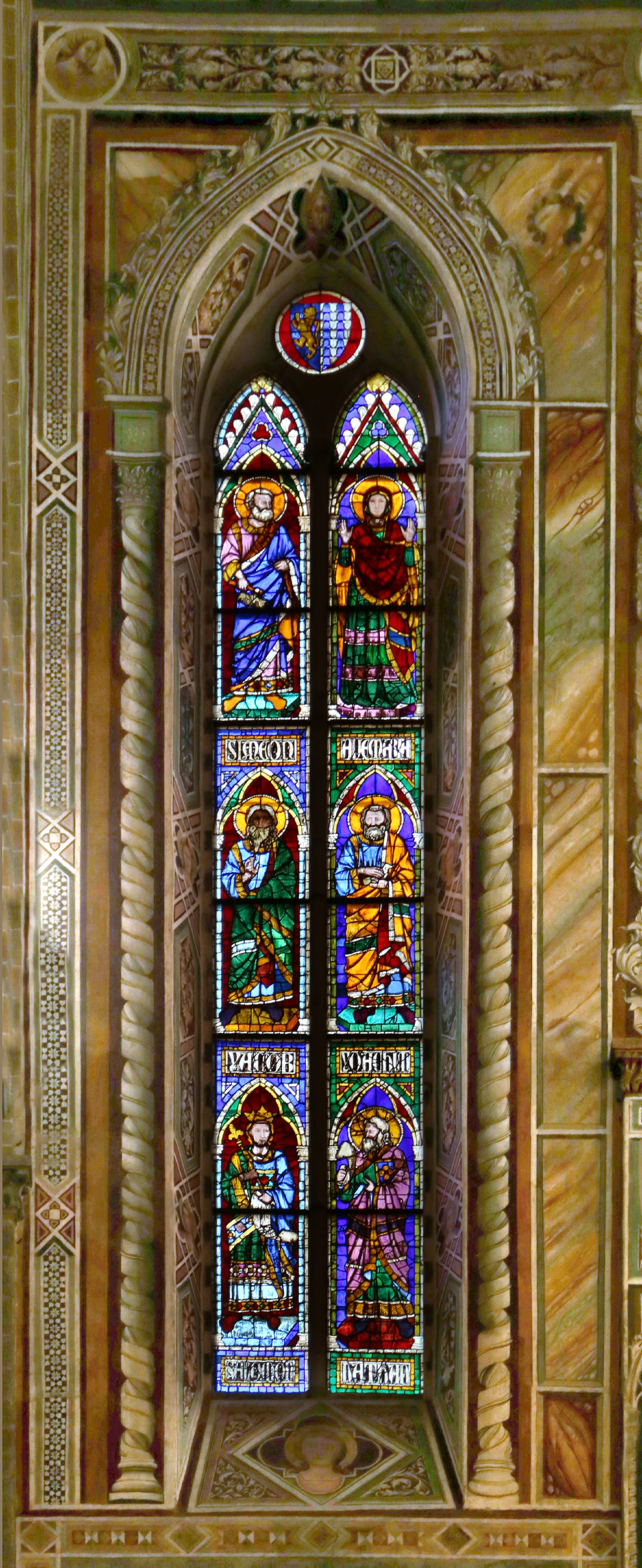
Window depicting the genealogy of the Virgin Mary, designed and created by the Master of Figline, ca. 1320-1325. Located above the Spinelli chapel to the left of the high altar chapel.

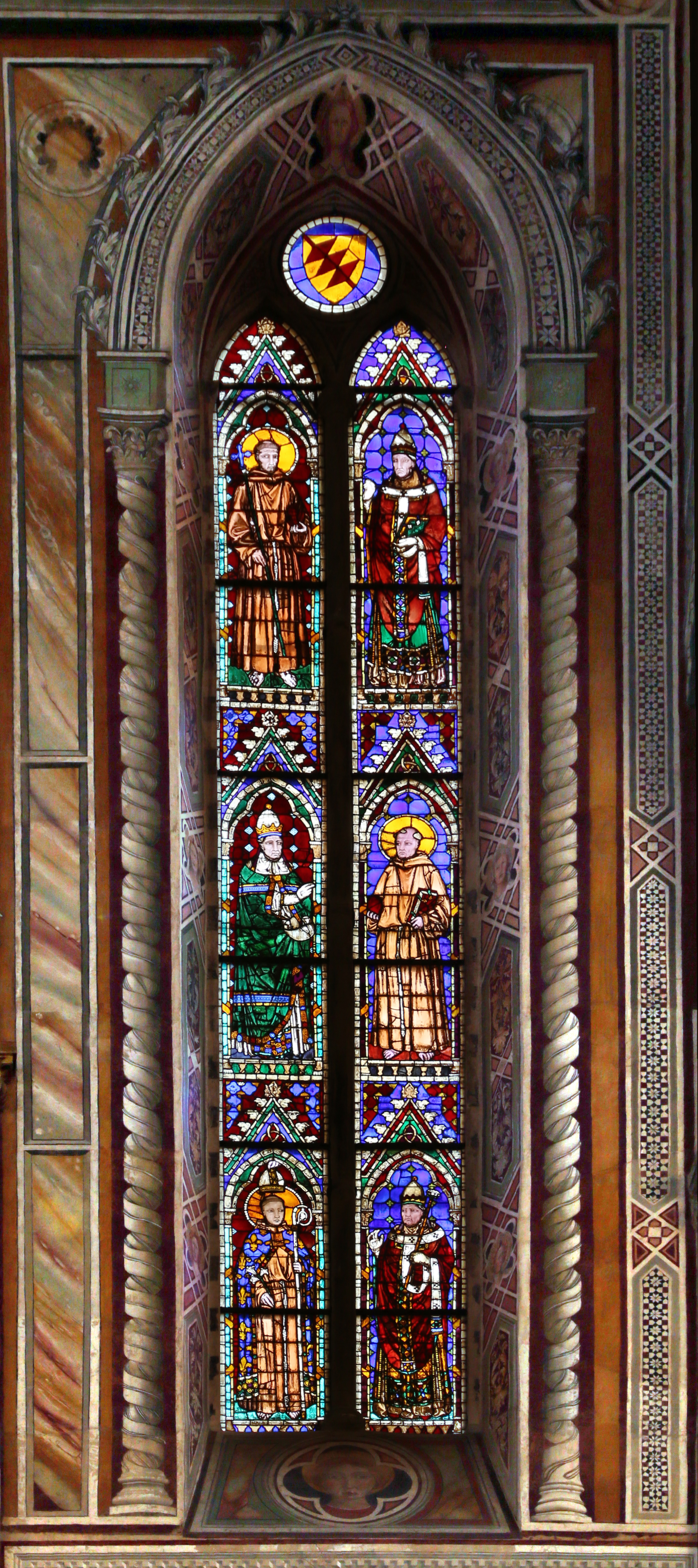
Window depicting Franciscan saints and Popes, designed and created by the Master of Figline, ca. 1320-1325. Located above the Bardi chapel to the right of the high altar chapel.

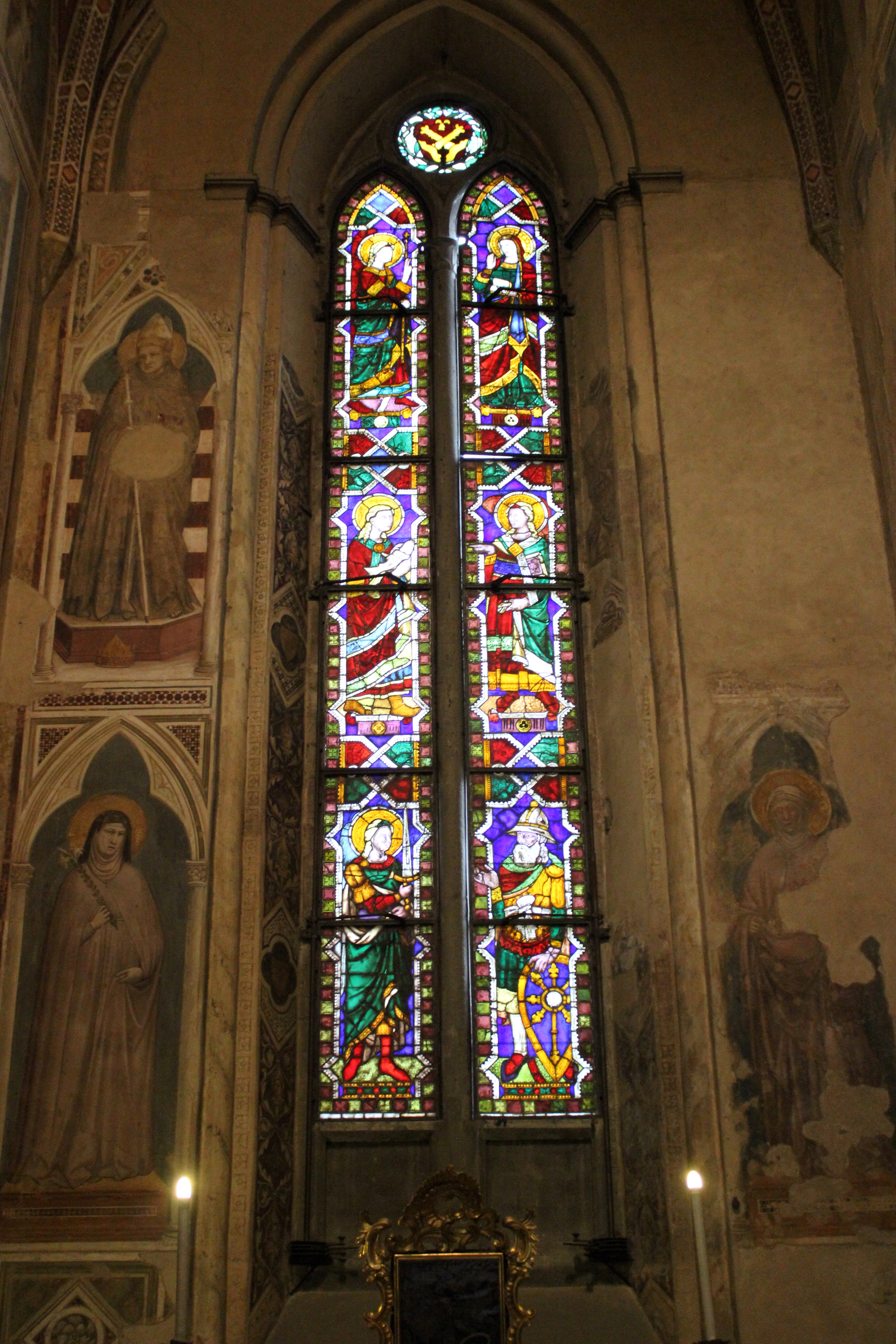
Window depicting the Appearance of the Angels, designed by Jacopo del Casentino and created by an unknown glazier, ca. 1321-1330. Originally located in the Velluti chapel; moved ca. 1945 to the Bardi chapel, where it is currently located.

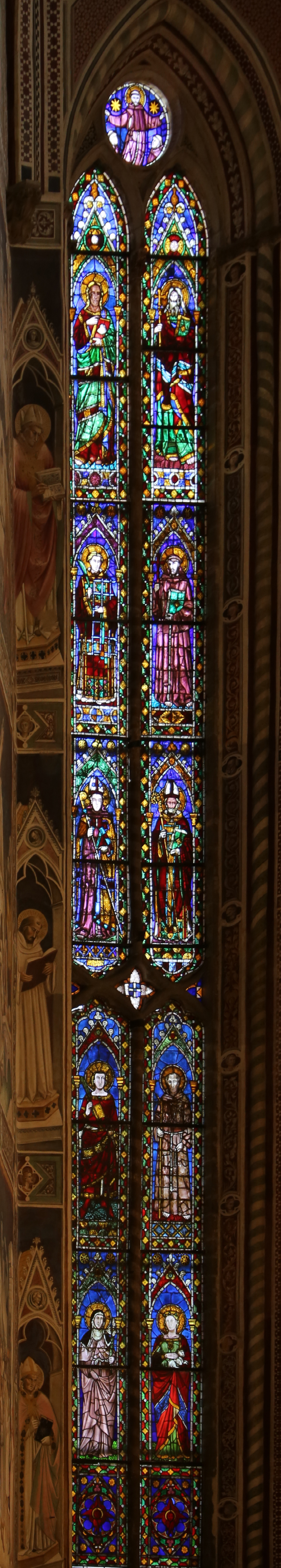

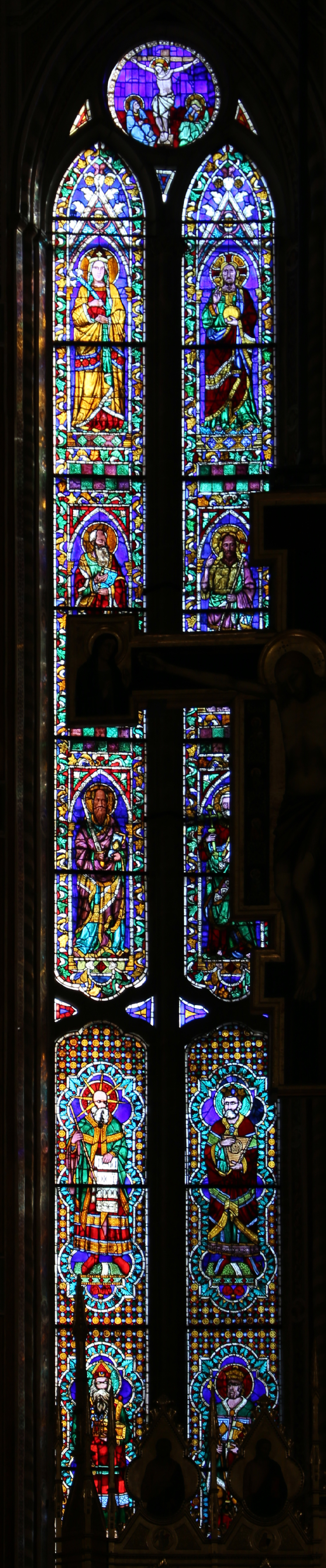

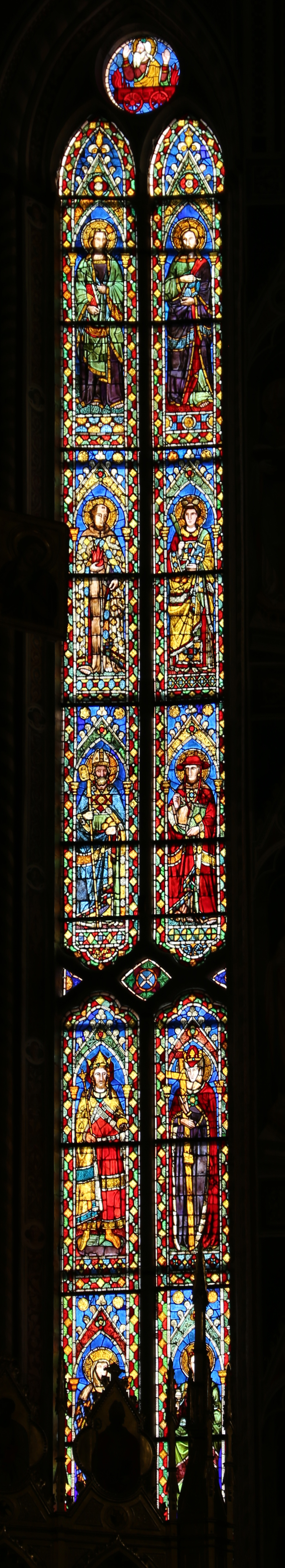

== Funerary monuments ==
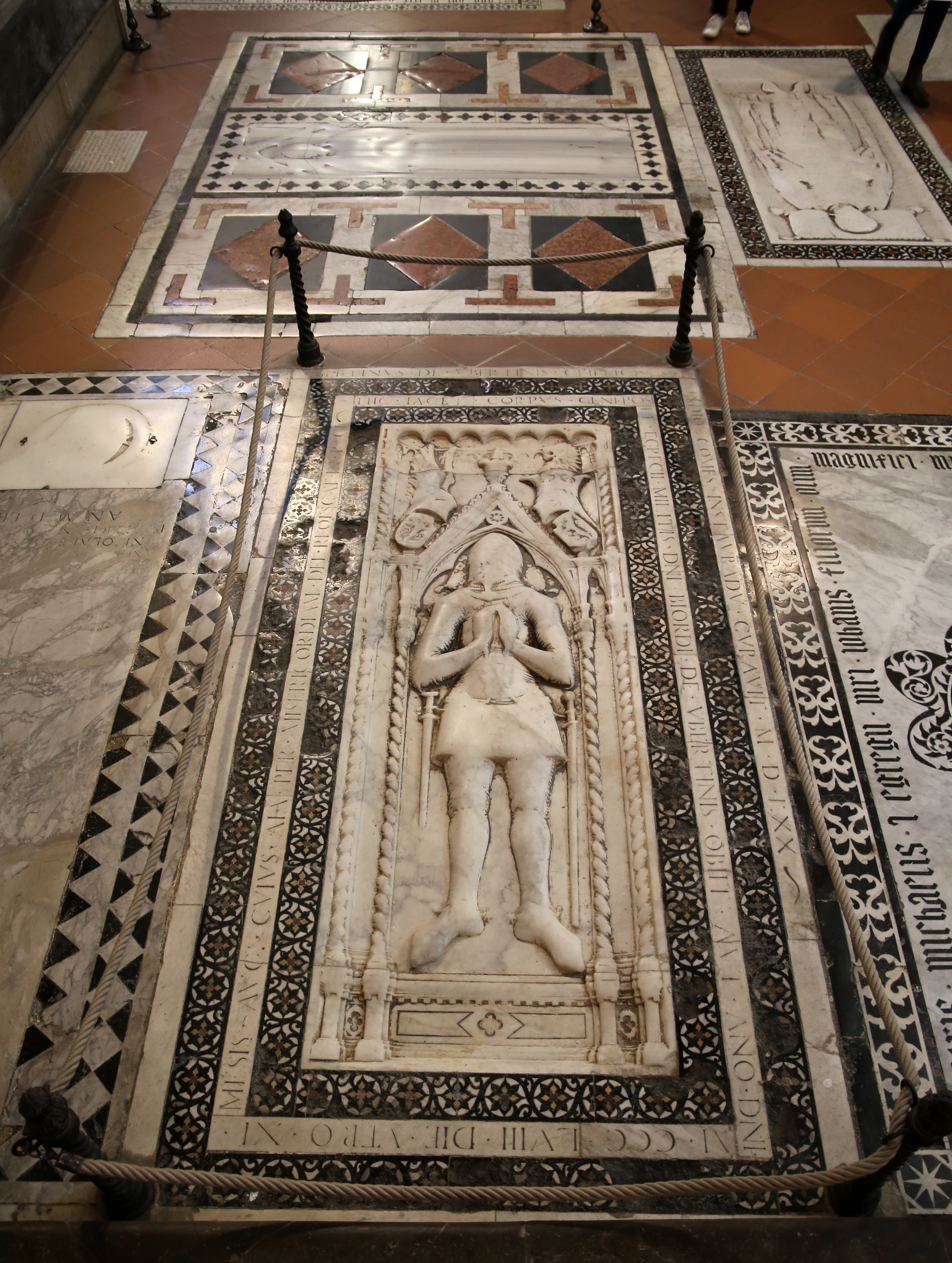
Medieval tombs on the floor (Knight Biordo Ubertini's, 1358-1430 ca.)

The basilica became popular with Florentines as a place of worship and patronage and it became customary for greatly honoured Florentines to be buried or commemorated there. Some were in chapels "owned" by wealthy families such as the Bardi and Peruzzi. As time progressed, space was also granted to notable Italians from elsewhere. For 500 years monuments were erected in the church including those to:

- Leon Battista Alberti (15th-century architect and artistic theorist)
- Giovan Vincenzo Alberti (Florentine senator and minister to first two Lorraine Grand-Dukes)
- Vittorio Alfieri (18th-century poet and dramatist) by Antonio Canova
- Eugenio Barsanti (co-inventor of the internal combustion engine)
- Lorenzo Bartolini (19th-century sculptor)
- Julie Clary, wife of Joseph Bonaparte, and their daughter Charlotte Napoléone Bonaparte
- Leonardo da Vinci (1919 commemorative plaque, buried in Château d'Amboise in France)
- Leonardo Bruni (15th-century chancellor of the Republic, scholar and historian) by Bernardo Rossellino
- Dante (buried in Ravenna)
- Ugo Foscolo (19th-century poet)
- Galileo Galilei
- Giovanni Gentile (20th-century philosopher)
- Lorenzo Ghiberti (artist and bronze-smith)
- Giovanni Lami
- Niccolò Machiavelli by Innocenzo Spinazzi
- Carlo Marsuppini (15th-century chancellor of the Republic of Florence) by Desiderio da Settignano
- Michelangelo Buonarroti by Giorgio Vasari with sculptures by Valerio Cioli, Iovanni Bandini, and Battista Lorenzi.
- Raffaello Morghen (19th-century engraver)
- Giovanni Battista Niccolini (poet)
- Gioachino Rossini by Giuseppe Cassioli
- Louise of Stolberg-Gedern (wife of Charles Edward Stuart, 'Bonnie Prince Charlie')
- Guglielmo Marconi (buried in his birthplace at Sasso Marconi, near Bologna)
- Enrico Fermi (nuclear physicist, memorial only - Fermi is buried in Chicago, Illinois)

=== Cloister monuments ===
- Giuseppe La Farina
- Florence Nightingale
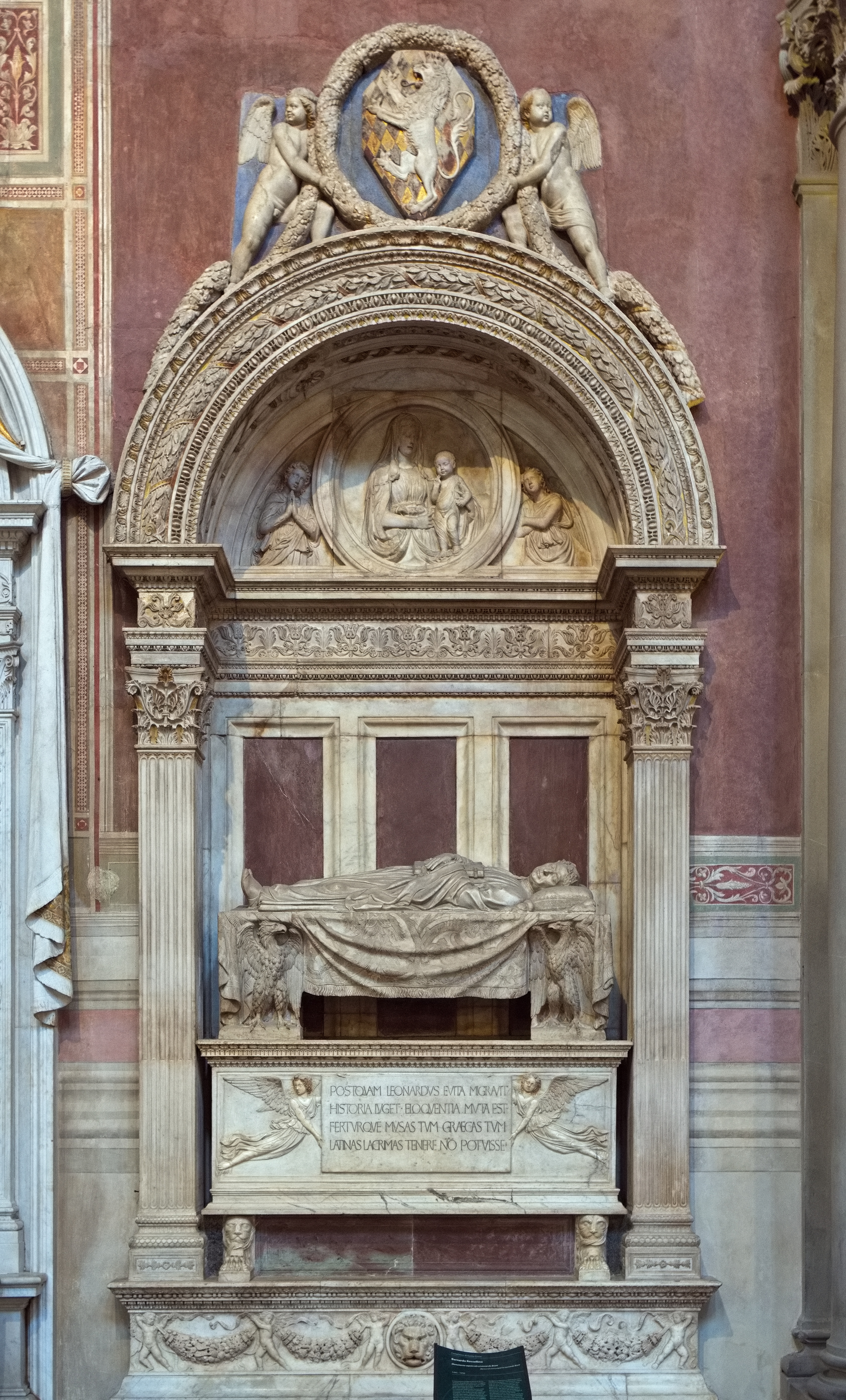
Bernardo Rossellino, Monumental tomb for Leonardo Bruni, 1445–1450

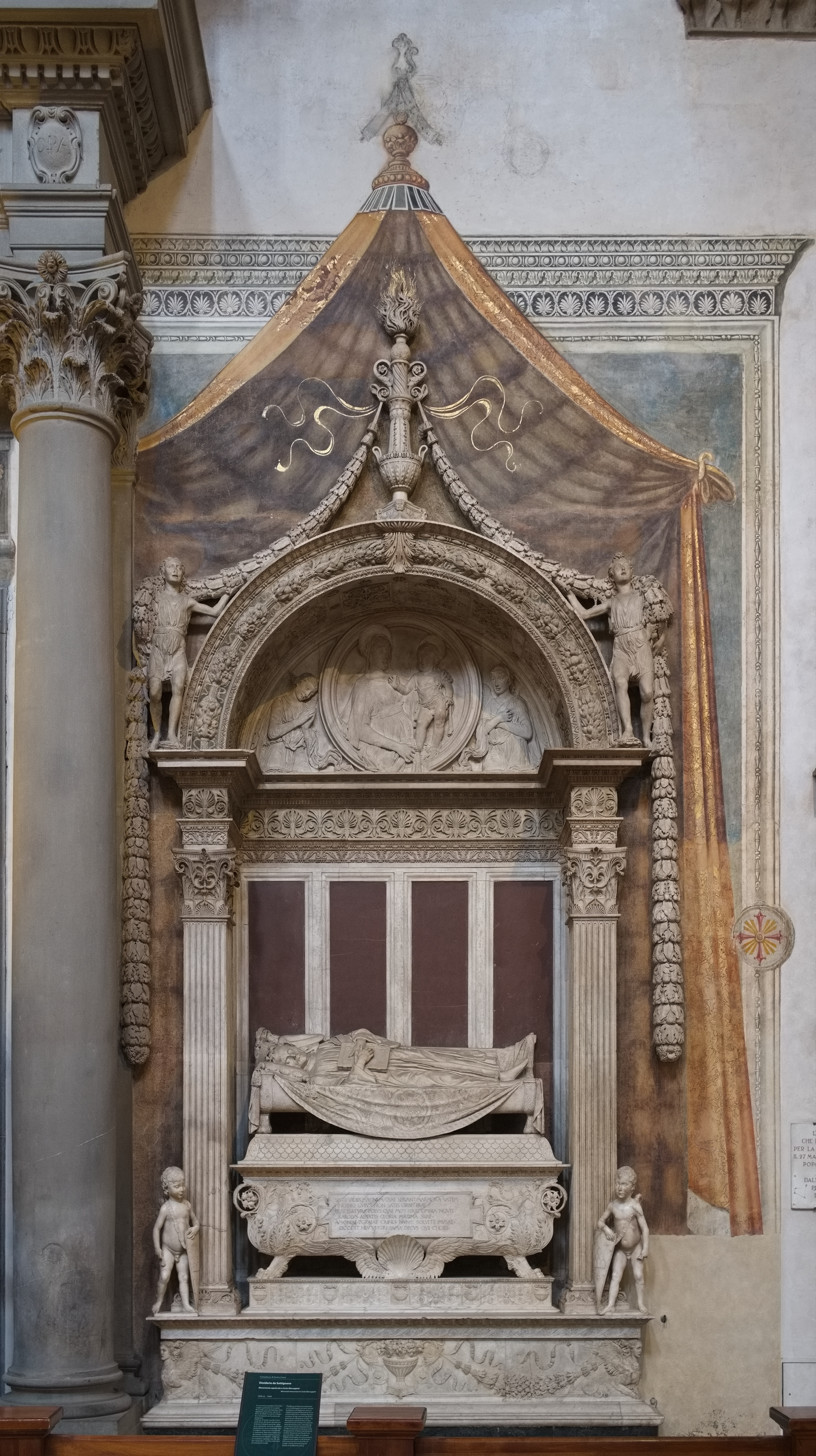
Desiderio da Settignano, Memorial Tomb for Carlo Marsuppini, 1453–1455

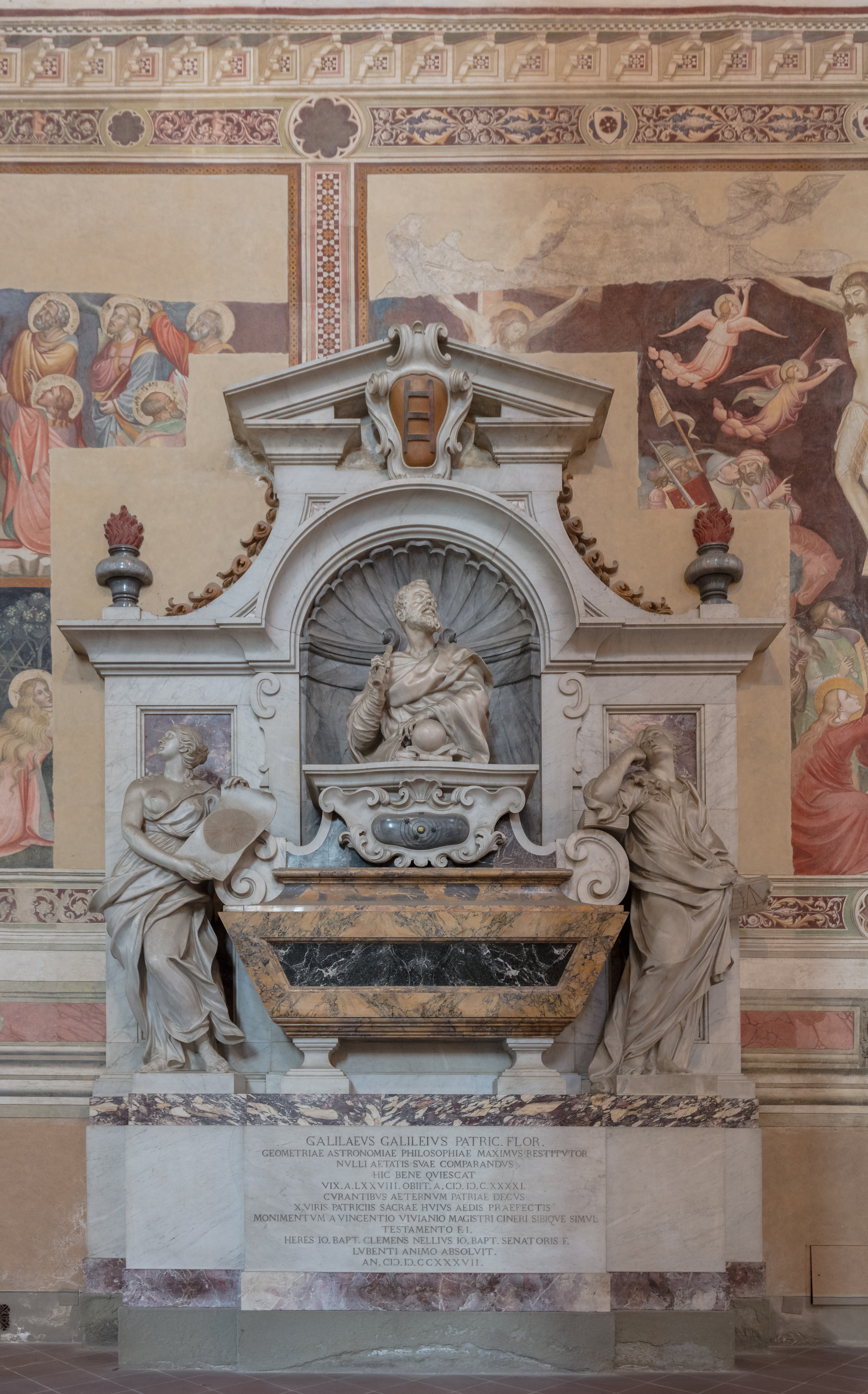
Galileo's tomb

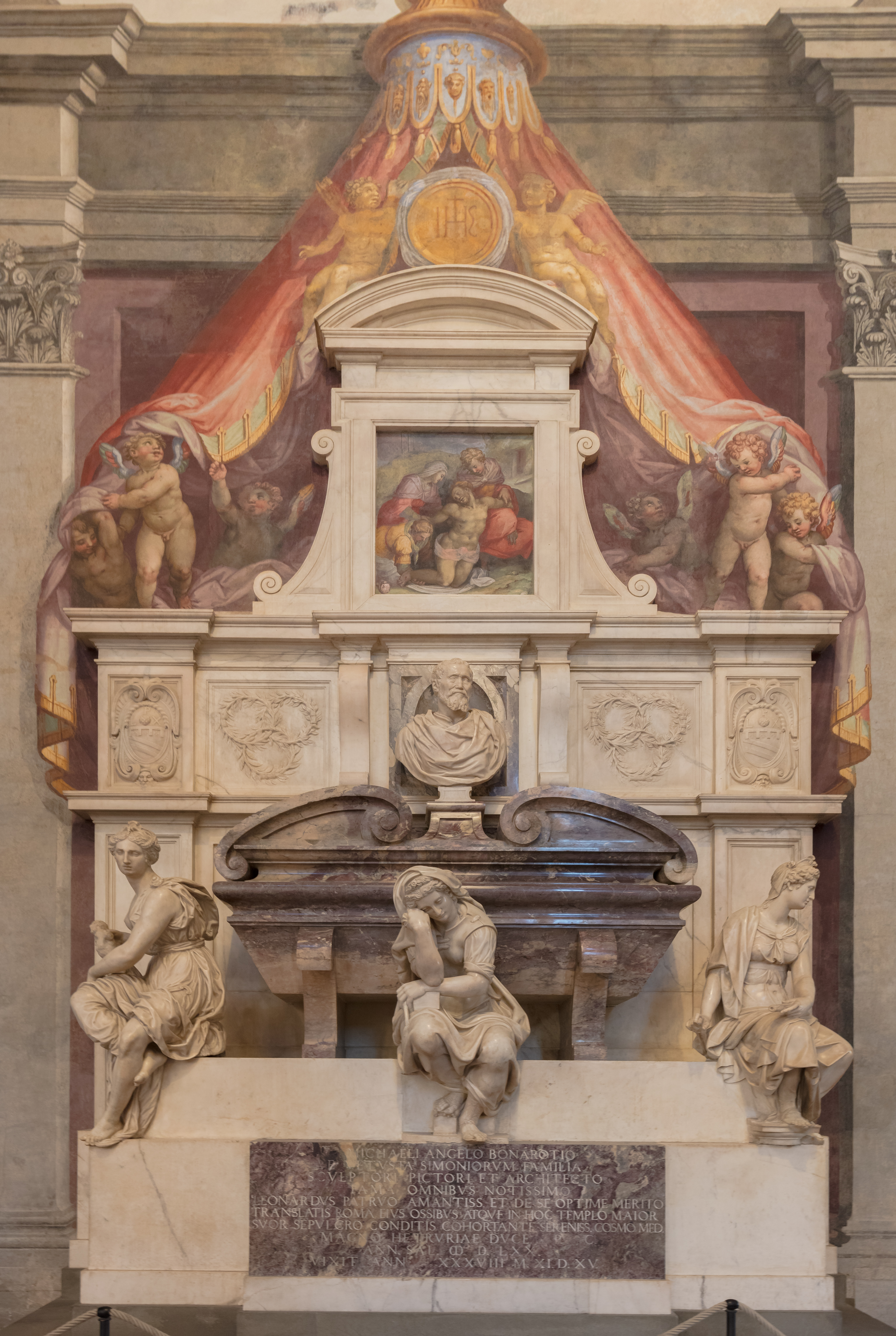
Michelangelo's tomb

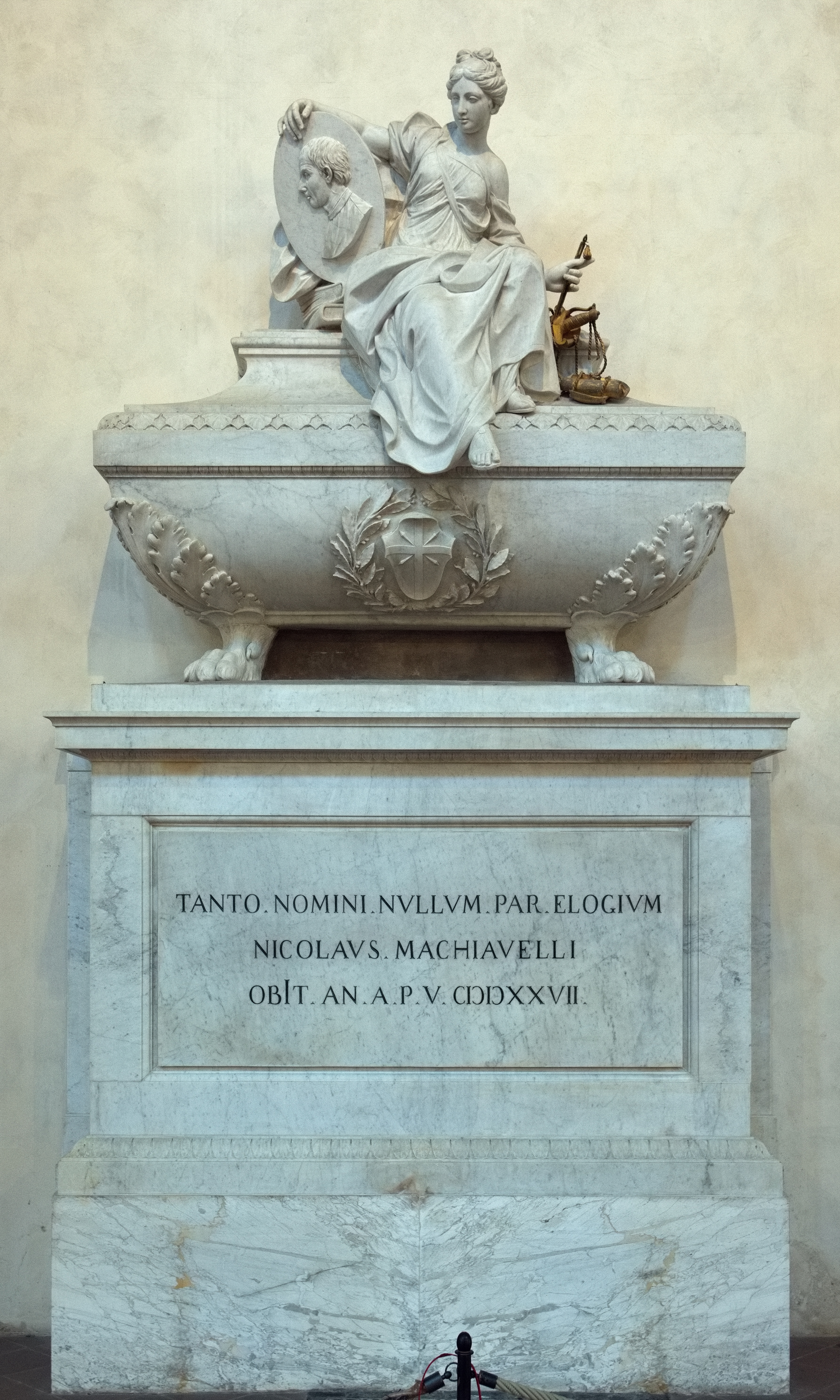
Innocenzo Spinazzi, Monumental tomb of Niccolò Machiavelli, 1787

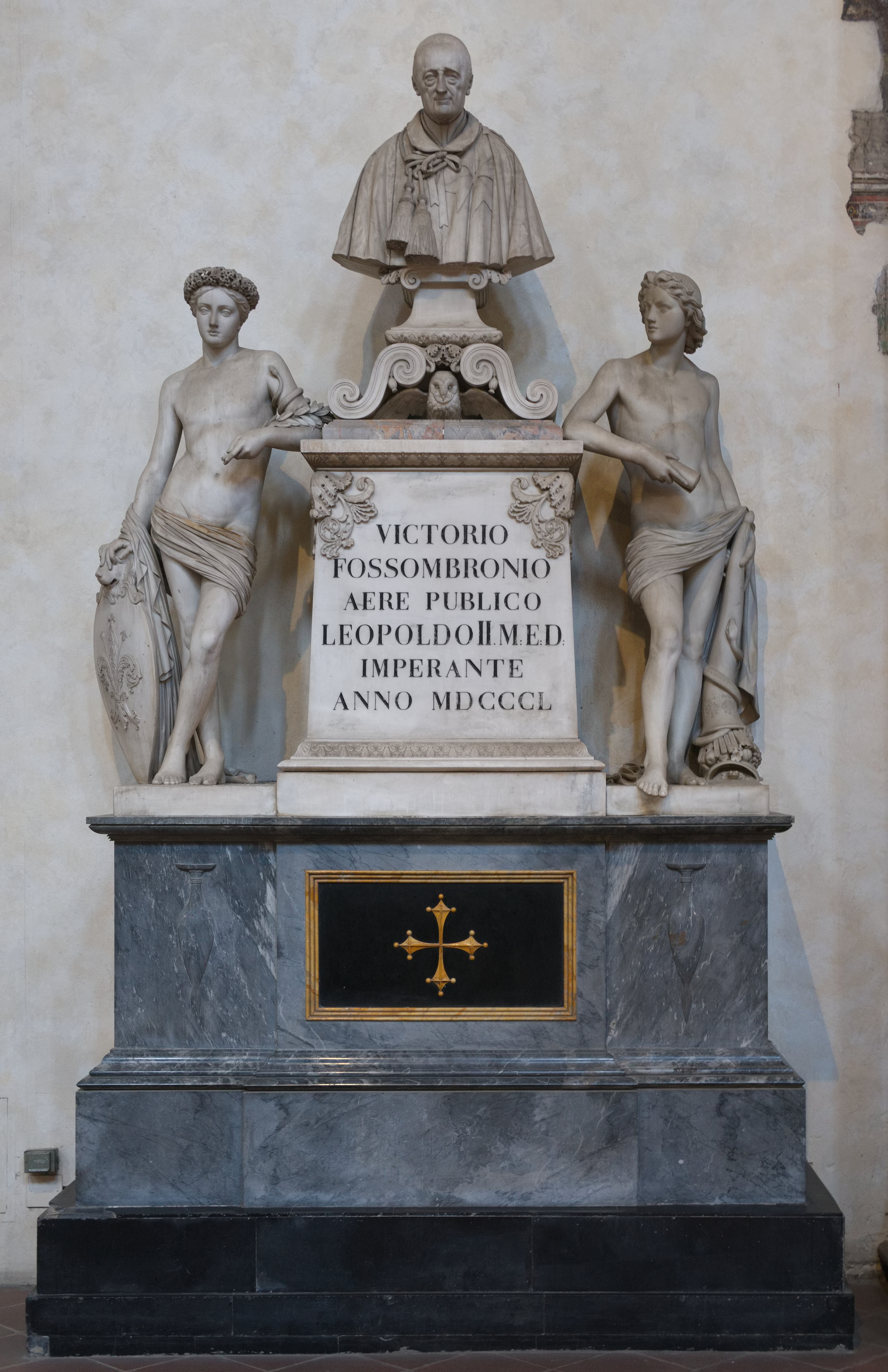
Memorial tomb of Vittorio Fossombroni (1754–1844), Santa Croce, Florence

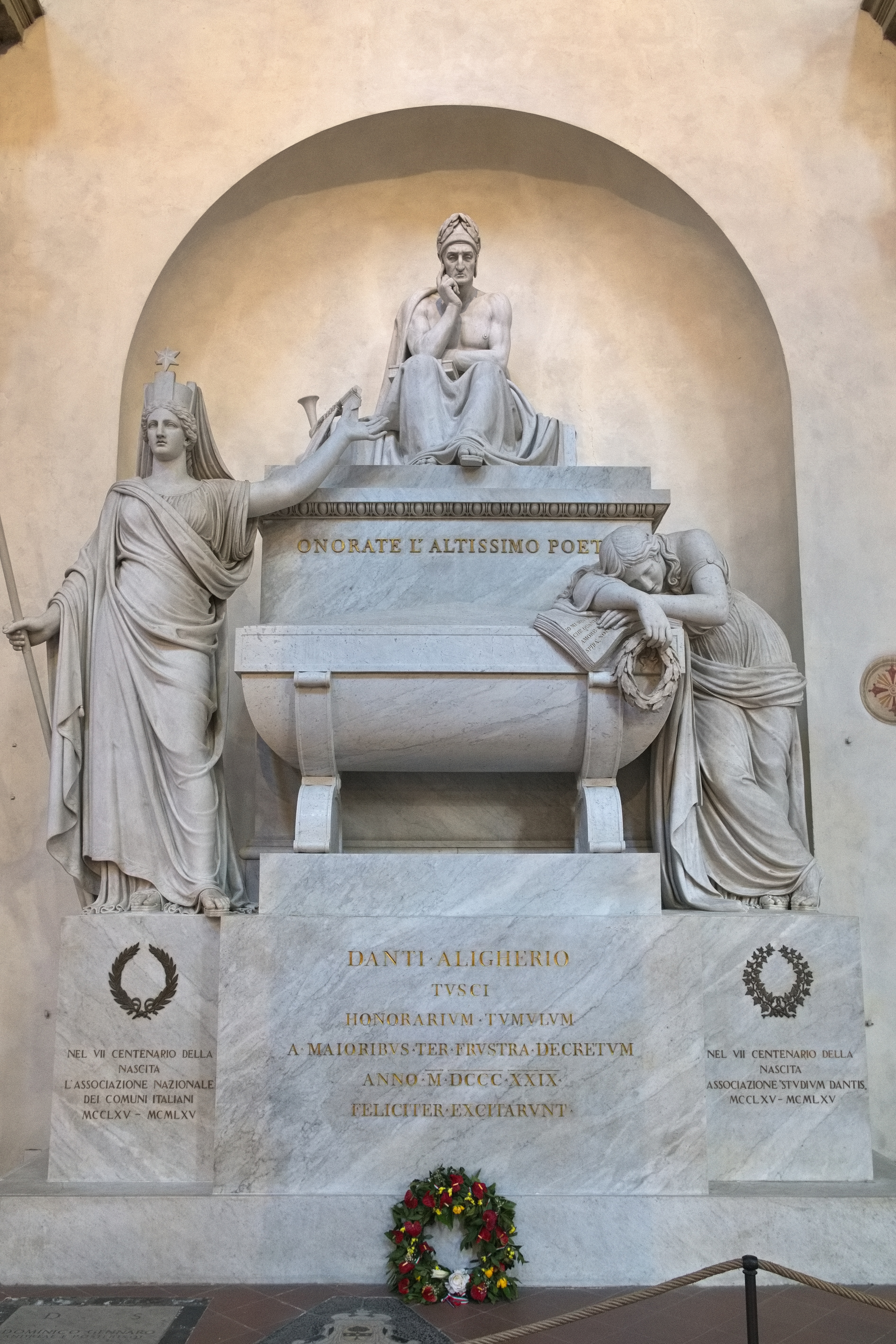
Cenotaph for Dante, 1829

== In literature ==
- Romola (1863), George Eliot
- A Room with a View (1908), E.M. Forster, Chapter 2
- Hannibal (1999), Thomas Harris, Chapter 35

== See also ==
- Late medieval domes
- Italian Renaissance domes
