= Emilio Santarelli =

Italian sculptor (1801–1889)

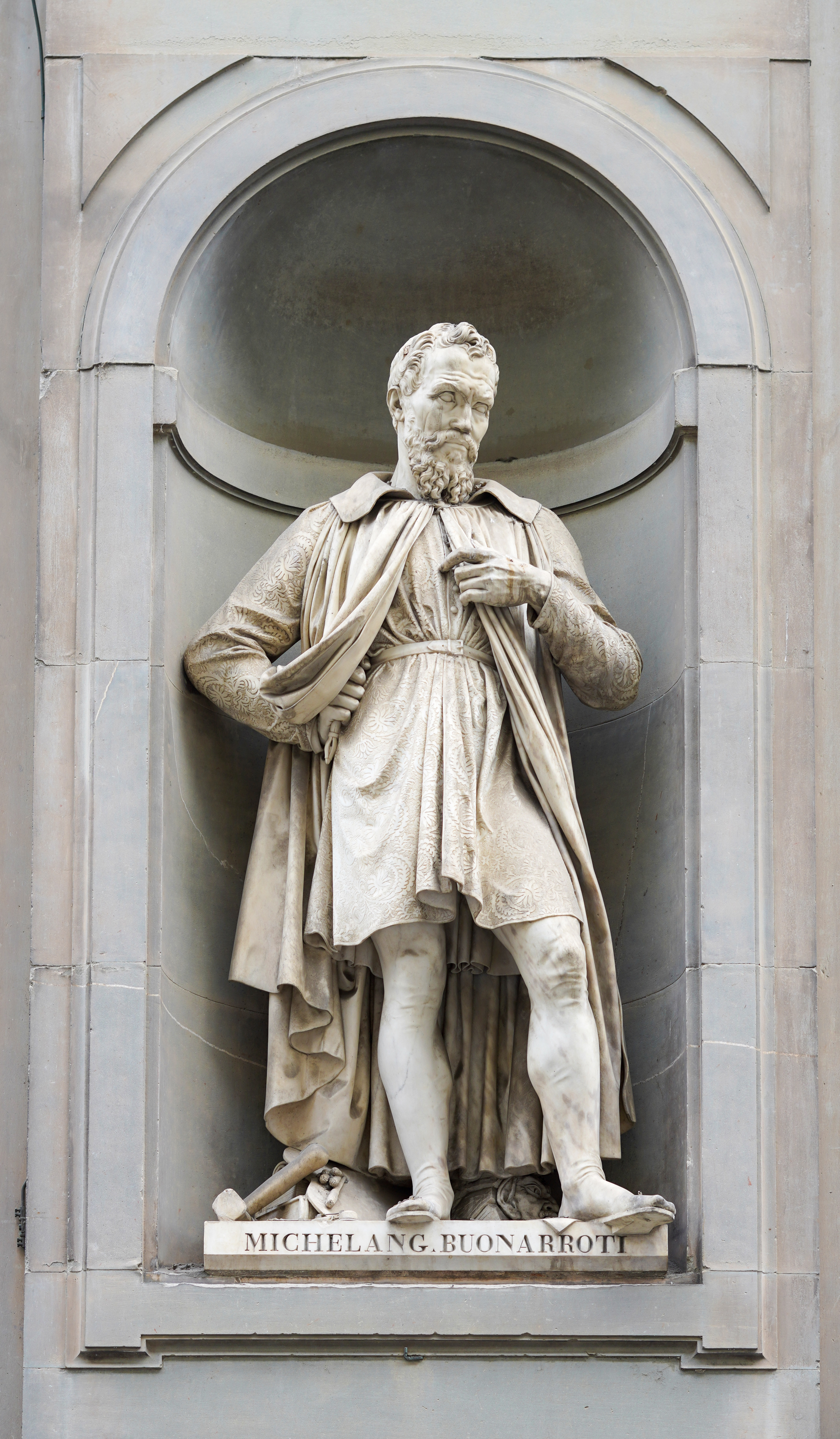
Statue of Michelangelo in the Loggiato of the Uffizi

Emilio Santarelli (1 August 1801 – 29 October 1889) was an Italian sculptor.

== Biography ==
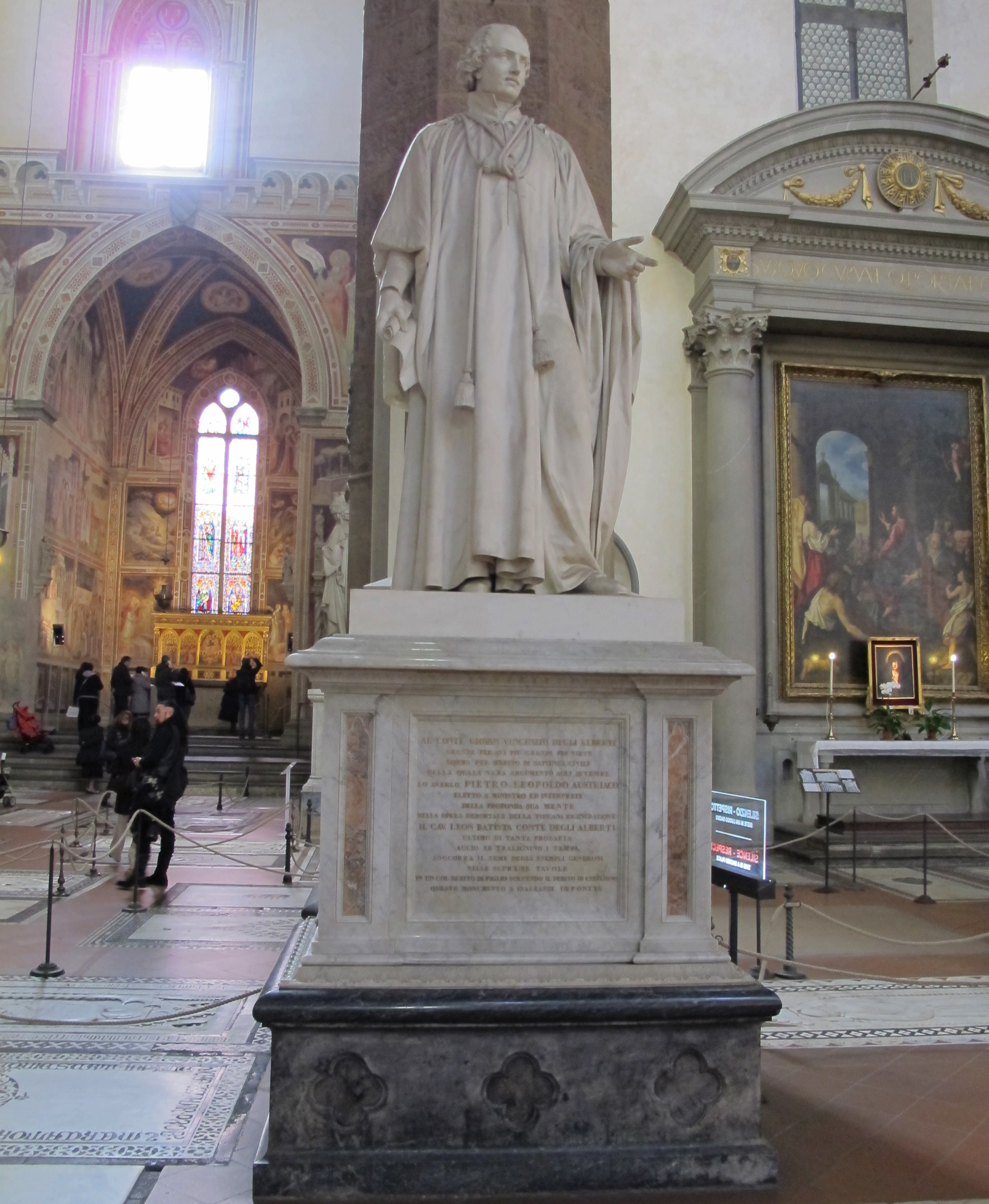
Monument to Giovan Vincenzo Alberti in Church of Santa Croce, Florence

Santarelli was born on 1 August 1801, in Florence, the son of Giovanni Antonio Santarelli, who worked as an engraver of cameo jewelry. He enrolled in 1814 at the Academy of Fine Arts of Florence, where he took classes with Francesco Carradori and Stefano Ricci (sculptor). In 1824, he won a stipend to study in Rome with Bertel Thorvaldsen. In Rome, he also met with Augustin Dumont. He was a prolific sketch artist and created many plaster models and studies.

In 1831, Santarelli collaborated on the stucco decoration for the ballroom of the Meridiana building of Palazzo Pitti, built by Pasquale Poccianti. He was engaged by Poccianti to also complete stuccoes for the Chapel of the Madonna in the sanctuary of Maria Madre di Dio at San Romano, near San Miniato al Tedesco.

In Florence, Santarelli completed the bas-relief for the tomb of the Countess of Albany in Santa Croce, Florence; the Countess' statue was completed by Luigi Giovannozzi. Also for pantheon- former church of Santa Croce, Santarelli in 1836 sculpted the monument to Giovan Vincenzo Alberti, former minister to the Grand-Dukes of Tuscany. This statue was commissioned by Giovan Vincenzo's son, Leon Battista Alberti, who also commissioned the monument to his famous ancestor of the same name, which is located across the nave and sculpted by Lorenzo Bartolini. He also completed in 1838, a bas-relief for the funerary monument of the painter Francesco Sabatelli.

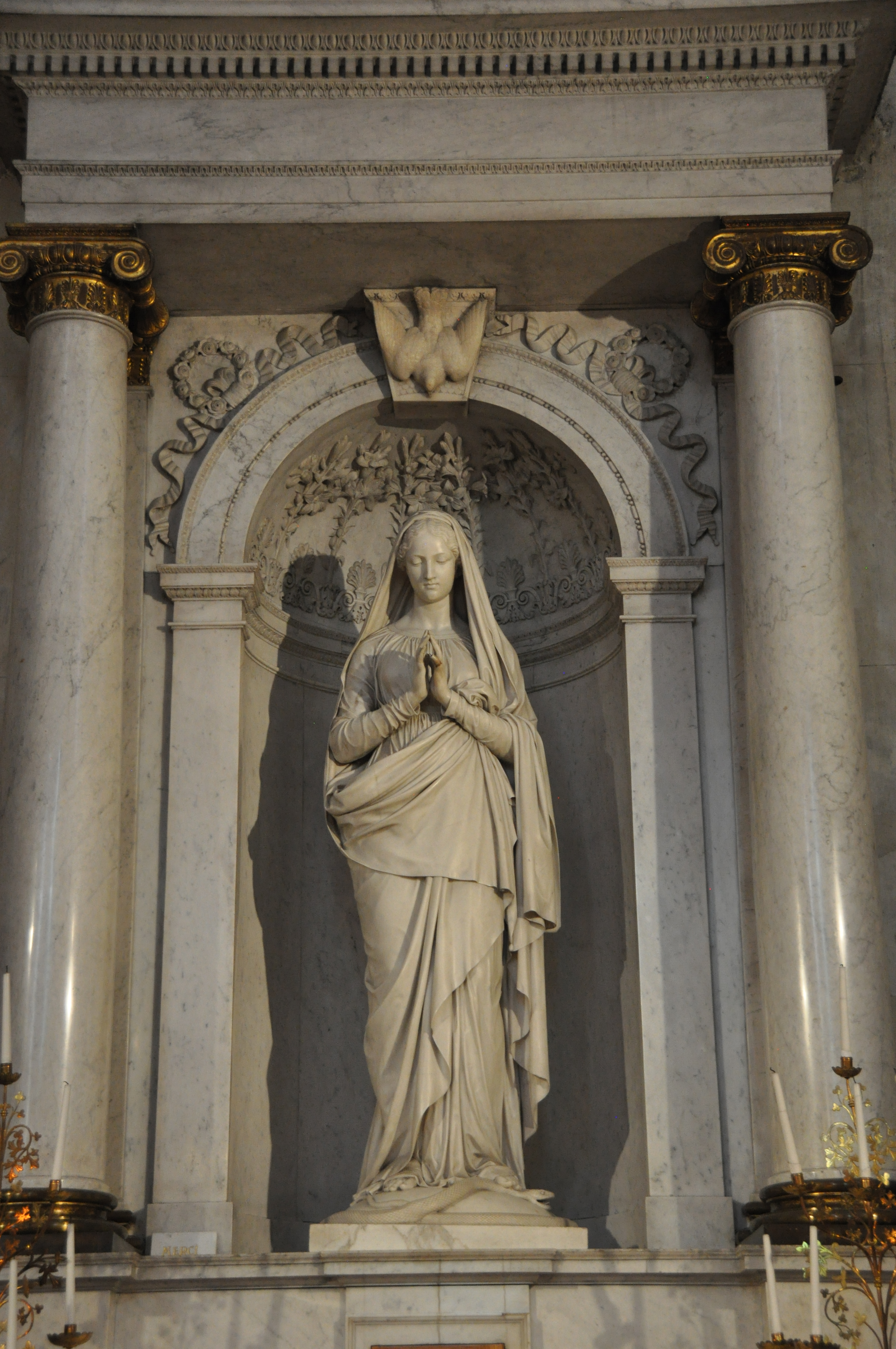
"Immaculate Conception", St-Pierre cathedral (Montpellier, FR). Work of Emilio Santarelli (1837) commissioned by François-Xavier Fabre.

In 1832, Santarelli designed the reliefs for the base of the monument to Pietro Leopoldo erected in Pisa. In 1835, the artist and patron François-Xavier Fabre commissioned from Santarelli an Immaculate Conception for the cathedral of Montpellier. The statue will only be completed and installed shortly after Fabre's death in 1837. Fabre would designate Santarelli as heir to his collections of drawings from artists from the Renaissance and Baroque eras. This collection is now in possession of the Uffizi Museum.

In 1837, Santarelli was able to buy a comfortable house and garden in Via della Chiesa #44 in Oltrarno. He was known for his cultivation of Camellias. In 1840, he completed the statue of Michelangelo for the series of prominent Tuscans displayed in niches on the ground floor courtyard of the Uffizi gallery, commissioned in 1836 by the committee established by Vincenzo Batelli.

Among his early free-standing statues were Apocrate (1838), La concezione (1858), Amor puro and Amor terreno.

Santarelli subsequently also made a number of statues titled Malignant love, Giovinetto cacciatore, Love in ambush, Love with butterfly, Poor Child, "Baccante corcata who is joking with a satirino", The fallen lily, and Prayer of Innocence. In 1865 he completed the monument of Giuseppe Bezzuoli, located in the church of San Miniato al Monte. Santarelli hired the sculptors Pietro Freccia and his brother, Clearco, to work with him until 1847. In 1866, he donated to the Uffizi his collection of drawings by ancient and contemporary authors.
