= Pierotti =

Pierotti is an Italian surname. Notable people with the surname include:

- Al Pierotti (1895–1964), American football and baseball player
- Ermete Pierotti (1820–c.1880), Italian architect and engineer
- Giuseppe Pierotti (1826–1884), Italian sculptor and painter
- John Pierotti (1911–1987), American editorial cartoonist
- Juan Mencarini Pierotti (1860–1939), Spanish mid-rank employee of the Chinese Maritime Customs Service
- Mario Rubén González Pierotti (born 1949), Argentine singer-songwriter, artistically known as Jairo
- Muriel Pierotti (1897–1982), English feminist and trade unionist
- Piero Pierotti (1912–1970), Italian director, screenwriter and journalist
- Raffaele Pierotti (1836–1905), Italian cardinal and theologian
- Raquel Pierotti (born 1952), Uruguayan mezzo-soprano opera singer
- Santiago Pierotti (born 2001), Argentine professional footballer

== See also ==
- Pieretti (disambiguation)
