= Giovanni Gherardo De Rossi =

Italian poet, playwright and politician

Giovanni Gherardo De Rossi (12 March 1754 – 27 March 1827) was an Italian poet and playwright, born in Rome, where his father was a banker and he himself would become finance minister during the Roman Republic of 1798–1799.

He studied law but devoted much time to arts and literature. On his father's death in 1774 he took over the family finances which were close to ruin. Through his financial acumen he managed to restore the family fortunes, but also had time to pursue his interest in literature, architecture and design.

He joined the Accademia dell'Arcadia in around 1776 and tried unsuccessfully to establish himself as an extemporary poet.

In 1784, together with Onofrio Boni, he embarked on several publishing ventures with the launch of the Giornale delle belle arti e dell'incisione antiquaria, musica e poesia and then Le Memorie per le belle arti. In 1788 he found success as a poet with the publication of seventy poems under the title Favole. Between 1790 and 1798 he published four volumes containing sixteen comedies, republished in 1826.

In 1790, he was appointed director of the Accademia di Portogallo in Rome. From 1792 he turned to biography and published many works on art and theatre. In 1798 he became a member of the Accademia di San Luca.

From 1798 to 1800, he was appointed minister of finance during the Roman Republic proclaimed under the rule of Napoleon Bonaparte.

He died in Rome and was buried in the church of San Carlo ai Catinari.

== Works ==
- Giornale delle belle arti e dell'incisione antiquaria, musica e poesia (1784)
- Favole (1788, 1789)
- Trattato dell'arte drammatica (1790)
- Apologhi, novelle ed epigrammi (1790)
- Commedie (1790-1798), sixteen comedies including Il cortegiano onesto, Il calzolaio inglese in Roma, La commedia in villeggiatura, and Le sorelle rivali
- Le Memorie per le belle arti (1792)
- Del moderno teatro comico e del suo restauratore Carlo Goldoni (1794)
- Scherzi poetici e pittorici (1794)
- La Vita di Angelica Kauffmann (1810)
- Vita de Pikler (1792)
- Notizie Biografiche del Cav. Angelo Maria d'Elci fiorentino
- Vita del Cavallucci (1796)
- Epigrammi, madrigali ed epitaffi (1818)
- Novelle (1824)

== Bibliography ==
- Jean-Charles-Léonard Simonde de Sismondi, Della letteratura italiana dal sec. XIV fino al principio del sec. XIX (Milan, 1820), pp. 172–177
- Alberto Manzi, Enciclopedia Italiana (1931)
- Andreina Rita, Dizionario Biografico degli Italiani, vol 39 (1991)
- La Biblioteca di Repubblica (2003), vol 6, p. 272
