= Chimera of Arezzo =

Ancient Etruscan artwork

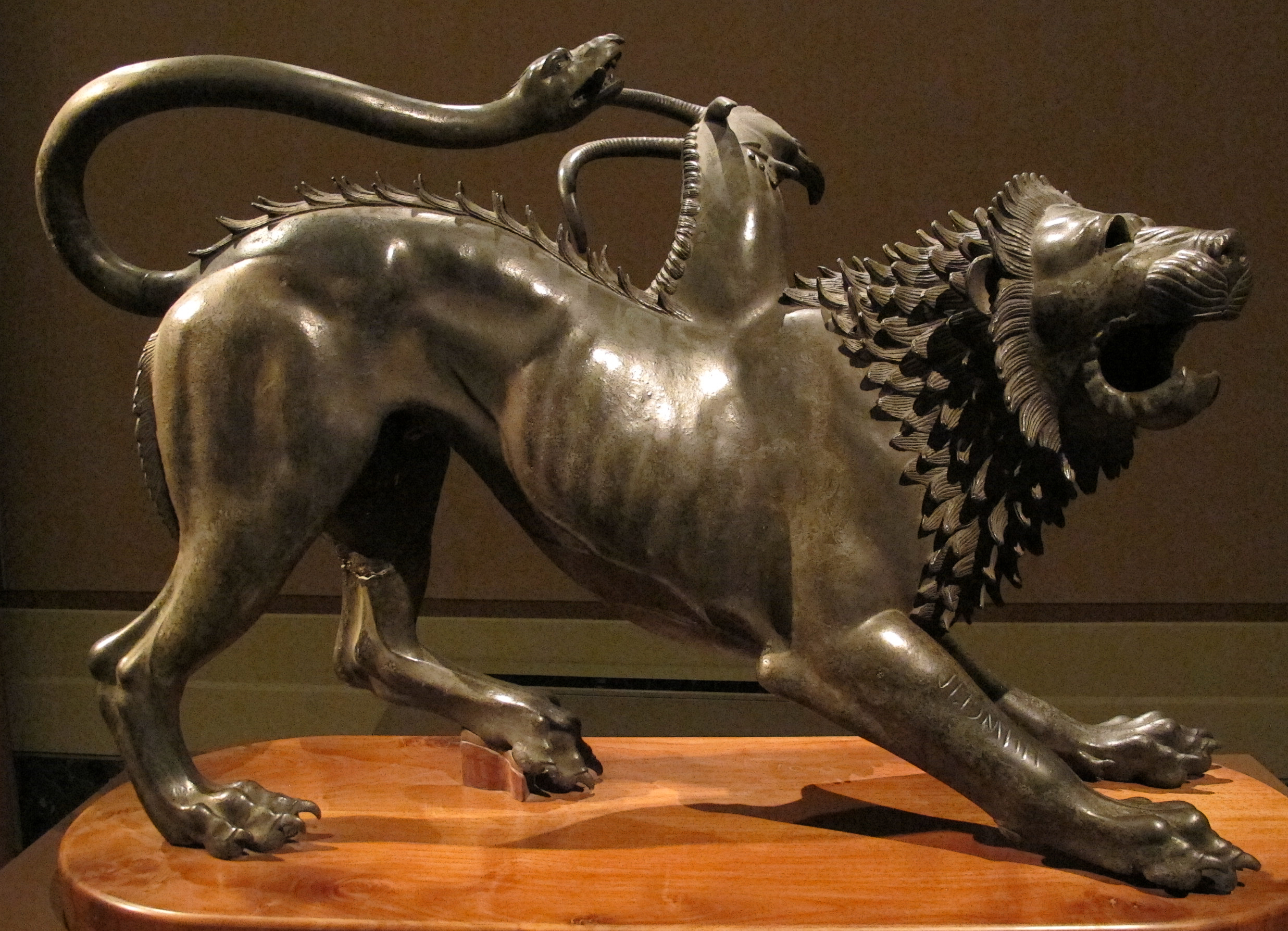
- Year: c. 400 BC
- Type: Bronze
- Location: National Archaeological Museum, Florence

The Chimera of Arezzo is an ancient statue depicting the Chimera, a creature from Greek mythology. Made entirely of bronze and measuring 78.5 cm tall with a length of 129 cm, it was found in 1553 alongside a small collection of other bronze statues in Arezzo, an ancient Etruscan and Roman city in Tuscany. The statue was originally part of a larger sculptural group representing a fight between the Chimera and the Greek hero Bellerophon. This sculpture is likely to have been created as a votive offering to the Etruscan god Tinia. The statue is regarded as the best example of ancient Etruscan art, and is held by the National Archaeological Museum, Florence. The British art historian David Ekserdjian described it as "one of the most arresting of all animal sculptures and the supreme masterpiece of Etruscan bronze-casting".

== History ==
The sculpture was probably commissioned by an aristocratic clan or a prosperous community and erected in a religious sanctuary near the ancient Etruscan town of Arezzo, about 50 miles southeast of Florence, ca. 400 BC. Historians have generally come to a consensus that the Chimera of Arezzo was produced by Italiote craftsmen in the last decades of the fifth century BC or in the beginning of the fourth century BC. The art historian A. Maggiani gives details of a clear Italiote context by pointing out iconographic comparisons from sites in Magna Graecia such as Metaponto and Kaulonia. (Italiote refers to a pre–Roman Empire Greek-speaking population in southern Italy; Magna Graecia refers to the Greek colonies which were established in southern Italy from the 8th century BC onwards.)

The Chimera was one of a hoard of bronzes that had been carefully buried for safety. Inscribed on its right foreleg is an inscription in the Etruscan language. It has been variously deciphered, but most recently it is thought to read tinscvil "Offering belonging to Tinia". The fact that this sculpture was a votive offering to Tinia is a reminder of the wealth and sophistication of Etruscan elites.

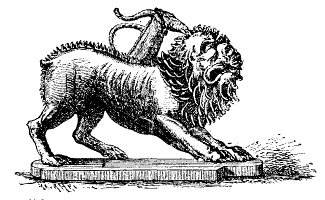
Chimera, Nordisk familjebok

The statue was discovered on November 15, 1553, by construction workers near the San Lorentino gate in Arezzo (ancient Arretium). (A bronze replica now stands near the spot of its original discovery.) The sculpture was quickly claimed for the collection of the Medici Grand Duke of Tuscany, Cosimo I, who placed it publicly in the Palazzo Vecchio in the hall of Leo X. Cosimo also placed the smaller bronzes from the trove in his own studiolo at Palazzo Pitti, where "the Duke took great pleasure in cleaning them by himself, with some goldsmith's tools", as Benvenuto Cellini reported in his autobiography. On discovery, the statue was missing the snake and its left front and rear paws. Due to its fragmented state upon discovery, the statue was originally regarded as a lion. The Italian painter Giorgio Vasari tracked down the statue motif by studying Ancient Greek and Roman coins, such as a silver stater featuring an image of the Chimera, thus accurately identifying it. Eventually, it was officially identified as being a part of a larger piece illustrating a fight between the Chimera and the Greek hero Bellerophon. The sculpture was found among other small pieces that served as votive offerings to the God Tinia.

In response to questions of the statue's true meaning, Giorgio Vasari wrote in his Reasonings Over the Inventions He Painted in Florence in the Palace of Their Serene Highnesses:

Yes, sir, because there are the medals of the Duke my lord who came from Rome with a goat's head stuck in the neck of this lion, who as he sees VE, also has the serpent's belly, and we found the queue that was broken between those bronze fragments with many metal figurines that you've seen all, and the wounds that she has touched on show it, and yet the pain that is known in the readiness of the head of this animal ...

In 1718, the sculpture was transported to the Uffizi Gallery and later, along with the remaining collection Cosimo I had originally seized, taken to the Palazzo della Crocetta. Court intellectuals of the time considered the Chimera of Arezzo to be a symbol of the Medici domination of the Grand Duchy of Tuscany. Since 1870, the Chimera has had been part of the collection of the National Archaeological Museum in Florence, from which it was placed on brief loan to the Getty Villa for an exhibition in 2010. As the sculpture made its way through the Florence museums, it increasingly attracted the attention of both artists and historians.

The tail was not restored until 1785 when the Pistoiese sculptor Francesco Carradori (or his teacher, Innocenzo Spinazzi) fashioned a replacement, incorrectly positioning the serpent to bite the goat's horn. It is much more likely that the snake had to strike out against Bellerophon instead since biting the head of the goat meant it was biting itself.

== Mythology ==
Main article: Chimera (mythology)

According to Greek mythology, the Chimera or "She-Goat" was a monstrous, fire-breathing hybrid creature of Lycia in Anatolia created by the binding of multiple animal parts to create a singular unnatural creature. As the offspring of Typhon and Echidna, the Chimera ravaged the lands of Lycia at a disastrous pace.

Distressed by the destruction of his lands, Iobates, the king of Lycia, ordered a young warrior named Bellerophon to slay her. This was also a favor to a neighboring king, Proetus, who wanted Bellerophon dead because his wife accused Bellerophon of rape and he assumed that the warrior would perish in the attempt to kill the beast.

Bellerophon set out on his winged horse, Pegasus, and emerged victorious from his battle, eventually winning not only the hand of Iobates' daughter but also his kingdom. It is this story that led art historians to believe that the Chimera of Arezzo was originally part of a group sculpture that included Bellerophon and Pegasus. Votive offerings for the gods often depicted mythological stories. A round hole on the left rump of the Chimera might suggest a spot where Bellerophon may have struck the beast with a now-missing spear.

== Iconography ==
Typical iconography of the Chimera myth depicts the warrior Bellerophon as he confronts the Chimera, or rides atop or alongside it. This iconography began to appear upon Greek vessels in 600 BC. The Chimera of Arezzo presents a very detailed and complex composition that most likely was meant for display and viewing in the round. The Chimera is clearly expressing pain throughout its body. Its form is contorted, its face and mouth open in outrage as it is struck by Bellerophon. Similar to Hellenistic sculpture, the Chimera's form and body language express movement as well as the clear tension and power of the beast's musculature and evoke in the viewer a feeling of deep emotional pain and interest in the contemplation of that movement.

== Gallery ==
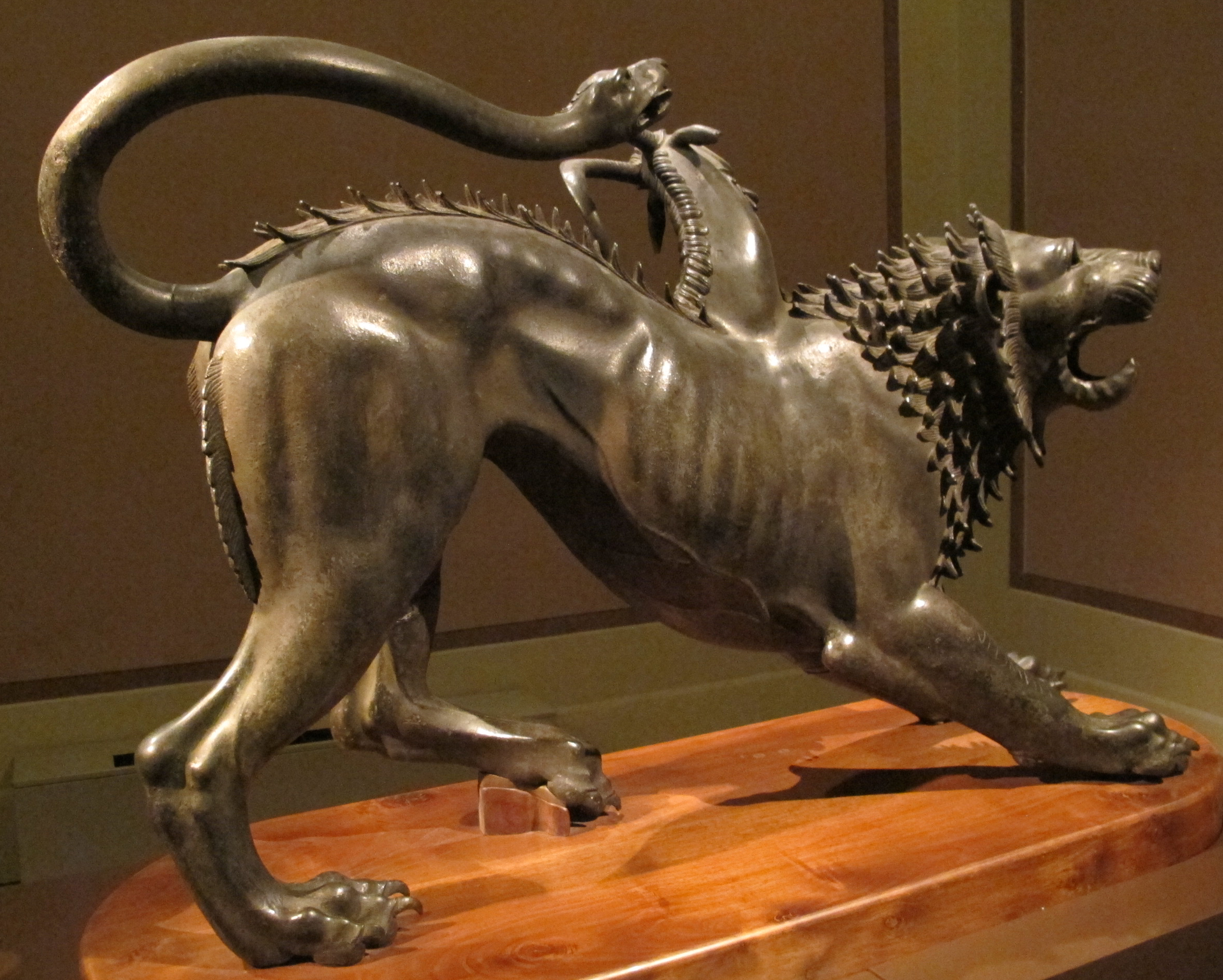

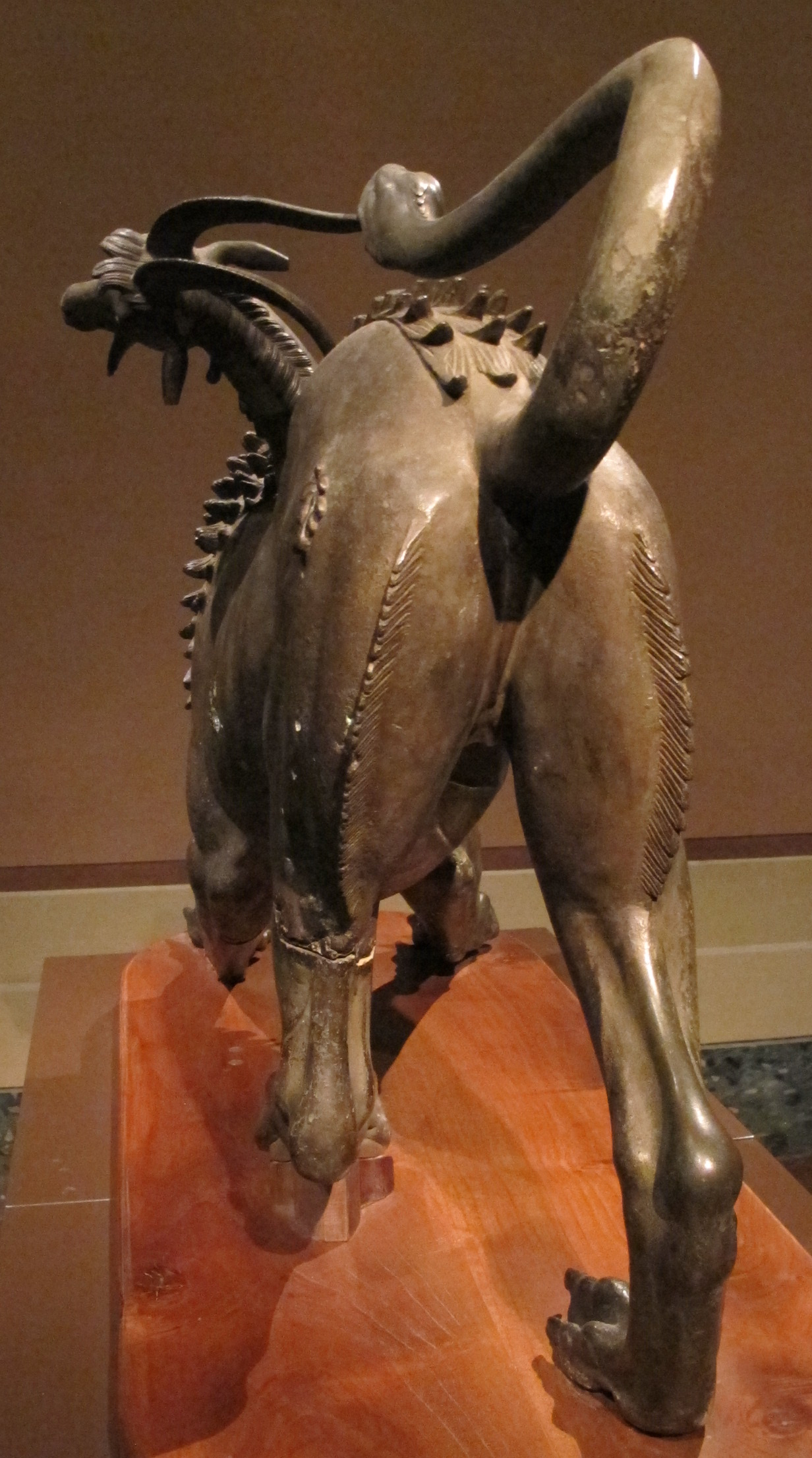

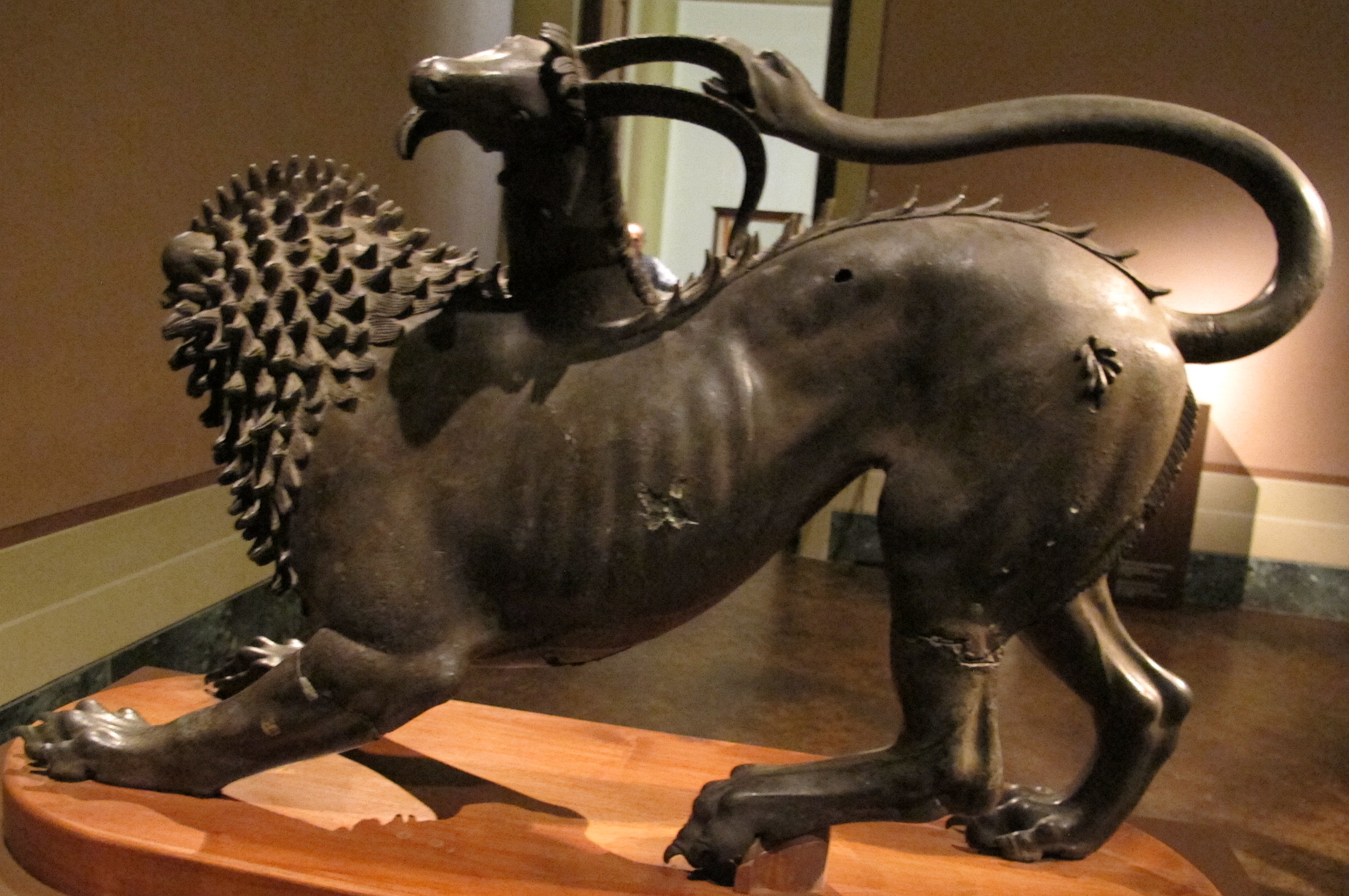

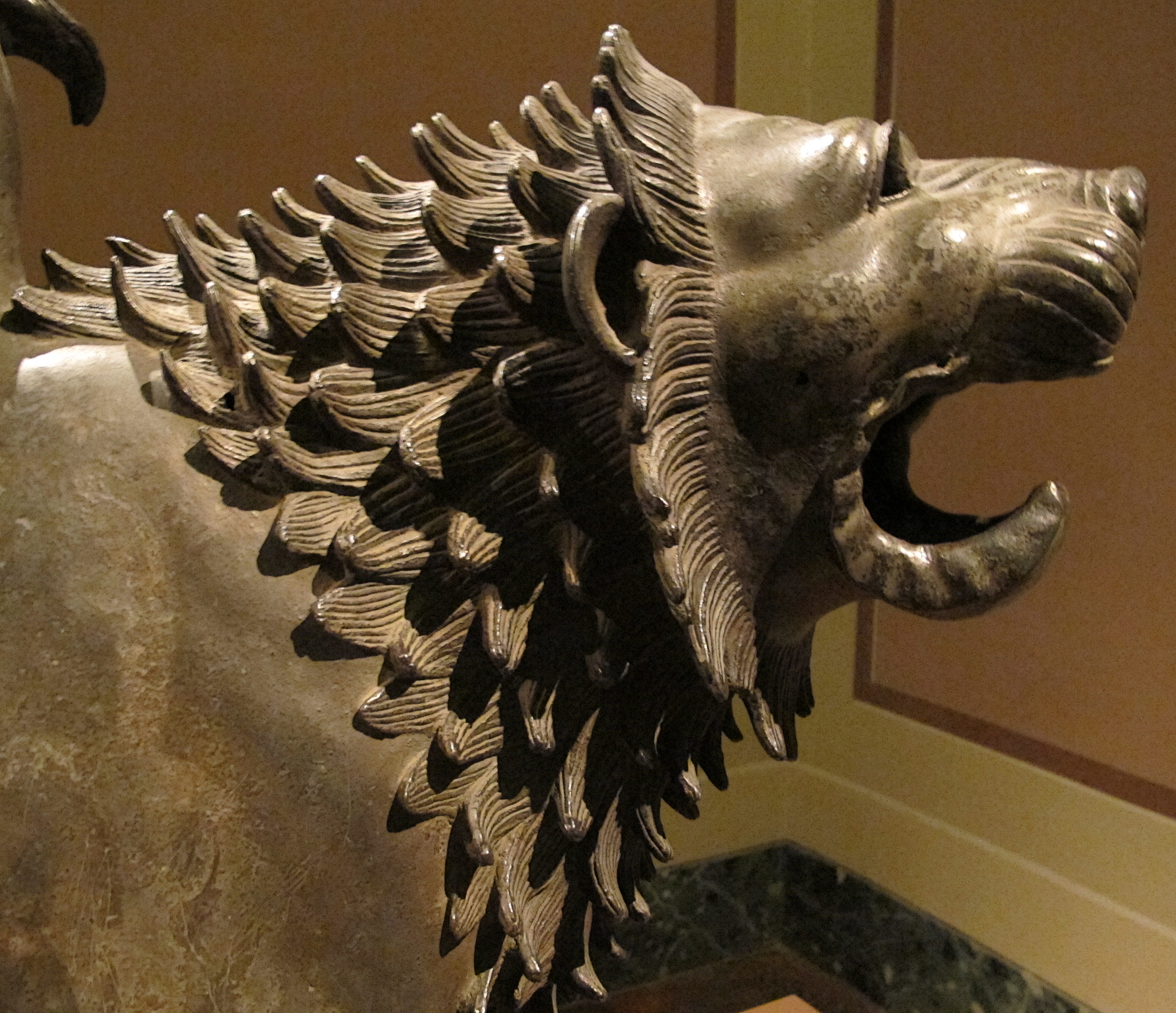

== Exhibitions ==
- September 15, 2012 – December 9, 2012 at the Royal Academy of Arts "Bronze"
  July 16, 2009 – February 8, 2010 at the Getty Villa

== See also ==
- Capitoline Wolf, a bronze long thought to be of 4th-century BC Etruscan origin, but possibly medieval.
