= The Entrance of Charles VIII into Florence =

Painting by Giuseppe Bezzuoli

The Entry of Charles VIII into Florence
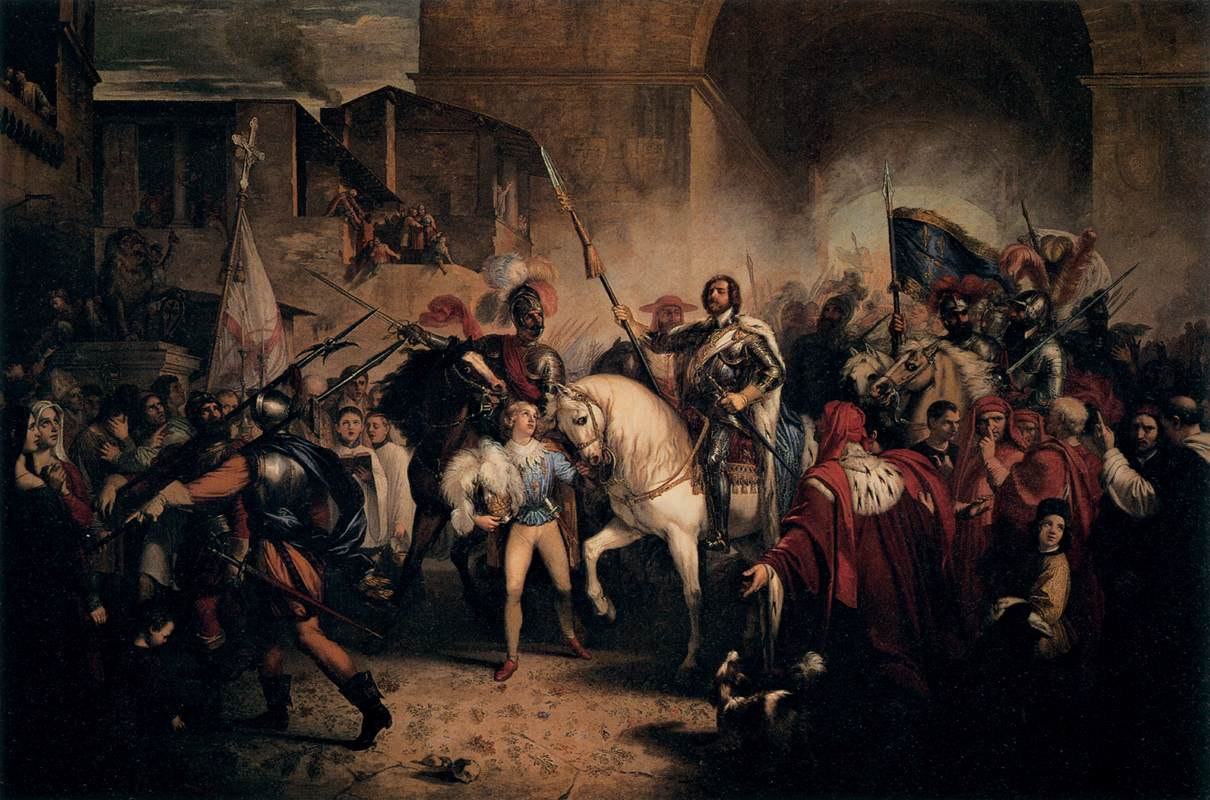
- Artist: Giuseppe Bezzuoli
- Year: 1829
- Type: Oil on canvas, history painting
- Dimensions: 290 cm × 356 cm (110 in × 140 in)
- Location: Palazzo Pitti; Florence

The Entrance of Charles VIII into Florence (Italian: L’entrata di Carlo VIII a Firenze) is an 1829 history painting by the Italian artist Giuseppe Bezzuoli. It depicts the French monarch Charles VIII entering the city of Florence in Tuscany in November 1494 during his invasion of Italy to uphold his claim to the throne of Naples, part of the Italian War

The painting was commissioned by the Grand Duke of Tuscany Leopold II. It reflected the political perspective of the patron, a member of the Austrian House of Habsburg and an opponent of Italian unification. It possibly was intended to show the benefits a foreign-born ruler could bring. It was first exhibited in 1829 and although depicting an unopposed occupation of the city, the triumphalism is undercut by the air of apathy or hostility by the citizens. Prominent Florentine figures of the Renaissance Niccolò Machiavelli and Girolamo Savonarola are included in the scene.

Along with Francesco Hayez, Bezzuoli was one of the leading Italian painters of the Romantic Movement. Today the painting is in the collection of the Palazzo Pitti in Florence.

== Bibliography ==
- Boime, Albert. The Art of the Macchia and the Risorgimento: Representing Culture and Nationalism in Nineteenth-Century Italy. University of Chicago Press, 1993.
- Woolf, Daniel R. The Oxford History of Historical Writing: 1800-1945. Oxford University Press, 2011.
