= Stefano Ricci (sculptor) =

Italian sculptor

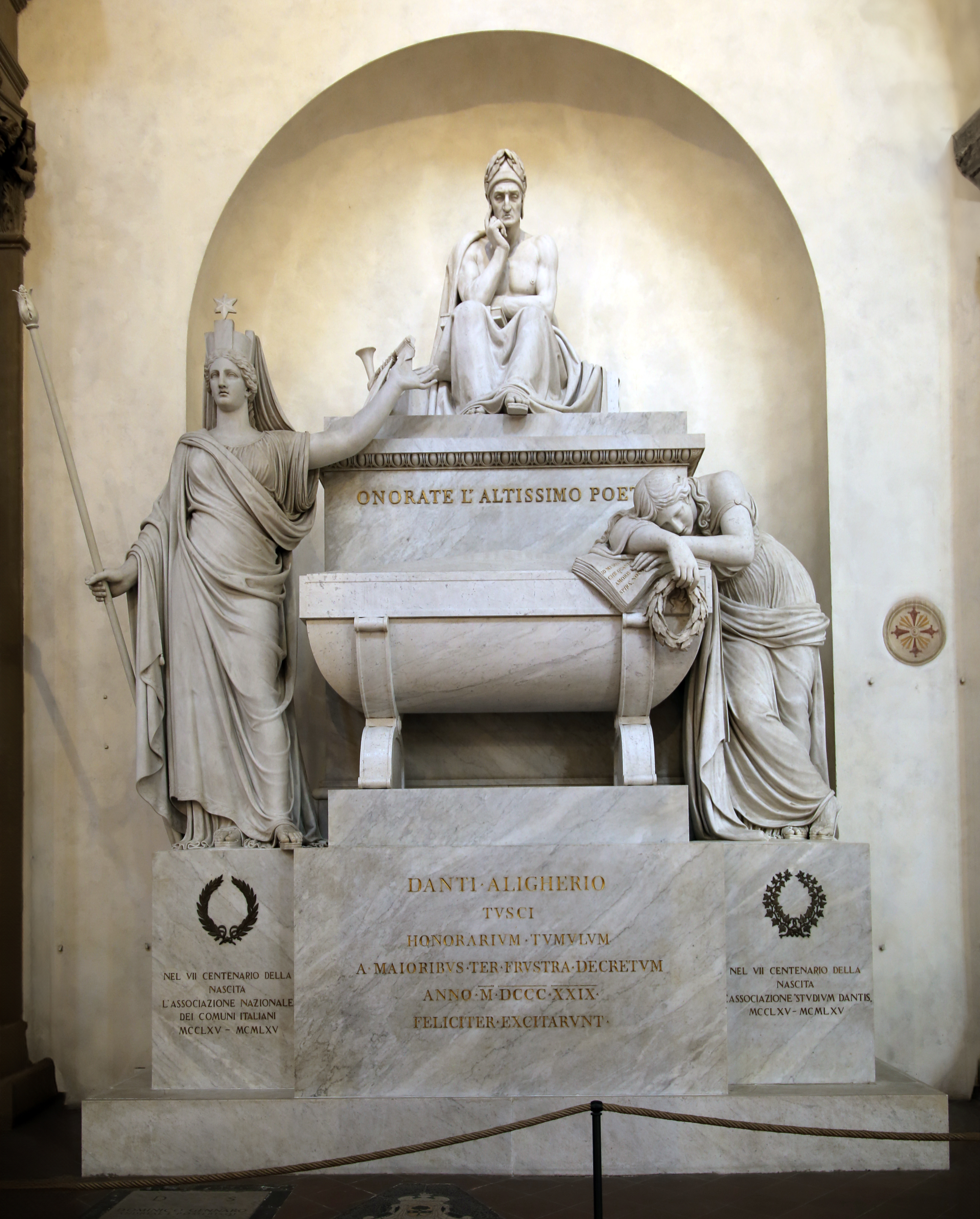
- Cenotaph of Dante in Santa Croce, Florence, 1829
- Born: 26 December 1765; Florence, Grand Duchy of Tuscany
- Died: 1837 (aged 71–72); Florence, Grand Duchy of Tuscany
- Known for: Sculpture
- Movement: Late-Rococo; Neoclassicism

Stefano Ricci (26 December 1765 – 1837) was an Italian sculptor, active in a Neoclassical style in Florence. Among his best known works are the cenotaph of Dante in the church of Santa Croce, Florence and the Purity in the chapel of Poggio Imperiale.

== Biography ==
Stefano Ricci was born near Florence on 26 December 1765 to Giovambattista Ricci and Lucia Rossi. He studied at the Accademia di Belle Arti di Firenze, where he was a pupil of the Rococo sculptor Innocenzo Spinazzi. Ricci distinguished himself in his studies. In 1786, he won an award for his terracotta replica of The Dancing Faun, a Roman marble statue from the Uffizi Gallery, and the following year he was premiated for his replica of the Herm of Zeno, a statue from the Capitoline Museums in Rome.

In 1795, he created his first original work: a marble statue of Saint Philip Neri for the Church of Santi Prospero e Filippo in Pistoia. This piece still bore the stylistic imprint of his master, Spinazzi. In 1797, he won the triennial competition organised by the Florentine Academy with an original bas-relief, Joseph Explaining Dreams to the Pharaoh’s Household, and an ex tempore piece, Elijah Fed by an Angel in the Desert. During his student years, Ricci collaborated with Spinazzi on several restoration projects. When his master fell gravely ill, Ricci was asked to cover for him.

His ties with the Academy strengthened in the following years. On 12 April 1802, he was appointed an academician, a privilege reserved for well-known and highly regarded artists, and the following year he became an assistant professor of sculpture by decree of Maria Luisa of Bourbon, Queen Regent of Etruria. From 1804 onwards, he ran a studio in premises that had belonged to the dissolved Compagnia dello Scalzo, near Piazza San Marco. Initially renting the space, he later purchased it, and hosted his students there for over thirty years.

Funerary monument of Maria Anna Testard Venturi, in Santa Maria Novella, Florence

In 1803, Ricci was commissioned to sculpt the funerary monument of Maria Anna Testard Venturi, in the Basilica of Santa Maria Novella in Florence. In 1808, he received a commission to create a funerary monument for the Polish Count Michal Bogoria Skotnicki, died in Florence earlier that year. Initially intended for the Church of San Domenico in Fiesole, the work was completed by 1812 and installed in the Basilica of Santa Croce, Florence in 1815. It was the first monument in Santa Croce dedicated to a foreign citizen. A replica was also created for Wawel Cathedral. The work was highly praised at the time for the noble simplicity with which it expressed sorrow, and for the quality of Ricci’s draftsmanship.

During the rule of Elisa Bonaparte in Tuscany the years of the Lorraine Restoration, Ricci created several funerary memorials. Examples include the memorial to the Bolognese mathematician Pio Fantoni, installed in the Basilica of Santa Croce in 1809; the memorials to the architects Giuseppe Salvetti and Gaspare Maria Paoletti, placed in the Peruzzi Chapel in Santa Croce between 1812 and 1818; and the memorial to Antonio Zannoni, set into the wall of the nave of the church of San Stefano al Ponte in 1817.

Following the reform of the Florentine Academy, approved by a grand-ducal rescript on 31 January 1815, he was appointed maestro di scultura (Master of Sculpture). He was a highly successful teacher, and the majority of students preferred his approach to that of the elderly Francesco Carradori. In 1817, he was invited to contribute to the decoration of the new chapel at the Villa del Poggio Imperiale, designed by the architect Giuseppe Cacialli. The overarching theme was the celebration of the Virgin Mary, and Ricci executed two of the six planned allegorical statues: Purity and Fortitude.

In 1818, he was commissioned to sculpt a bust of the philologist Angelo Maria d'Elci for the Sala d'Elci in the Laurentian Library, a space built specifically to house d’Elci's precious book collection. In November 1822, Ricci completed the Monument to Ferdinand III of Tuscany. The large statue depicts the Grand Duke wearing classical-style robes and an oak-leaf crown. The monument was praised by Emperor Francis I of Austria, who visited the sculptor's studio in March 1819. Between 1825 and 1827, Ricci created a portrait bust of the Grand Duke, who had died in June the previous year, which was placed in the vestibule of the Uffizi. On 24 March 1830, Ricci's most famous work, the Cenotaph of Dante in the Basilica of Santa Croce was unveiled during a solemn ceremony. This work held great civic significance and occupied the sculptor for approximately fifteen years, from its initial conception to its final public display. Ricci died in Florence on 23 November 1837, and was buried in the cloisters of Santa Croce. The most notable among his pupils was Lorenzo Nencini.

Ricci was also consistently active as a restorer of ancient monuments. Among his many projects, he cleaned Michelangelo’s David and restored the middle finger of its right hand. He also worked on the Venus de' Medici following its return from Paris in 1816, as well as on Verrocchio’s Putto in the Palazzo Vecchio in 1829. In his later years, he carried out interventions on the medieval pulpits of San Giovanni Fuoricivitas in Pistoia (1836–37). From 1830, he oversaw the complex restoration of the two Roman marble replicas of the Hellenistic Pasquino Group displayed in the Loggia dei Lanzi and the Cortile dell'Aiace at Palazzo Pitti.

== Bibliography ==
- Caldini, Riccardo (2016). "RICCI, Stefano". Dizionario Biografico degli Italiani (in Italian). Vol. 87: Renzi–Robortello. Rome: Institute of the Italian Encyclopaedia. ISBN 978-88-12-00032-6.
