= Pieretti =

Pieretti is an Italian surname. Notable people with the surname include:

- Alfredo Wiechers Pieretti (1881–1964), Puerto Rican architect
- Marcelo Pieretti (born 1970), Argentine rower
- Marino Pieretti (1920–1981), Italian-born American baseball player

== Other uses ==
- Industria Cartaria Pieretti, an Italian company that produces cardboard for industrial use

== See also ==
- Pierotti (disambiguation)
