= Giuseppe Raggio =

Italian painter (1823-1916)

Giuseppe Raggio (1823–1916) was an Italian painter.

== Life and career ==
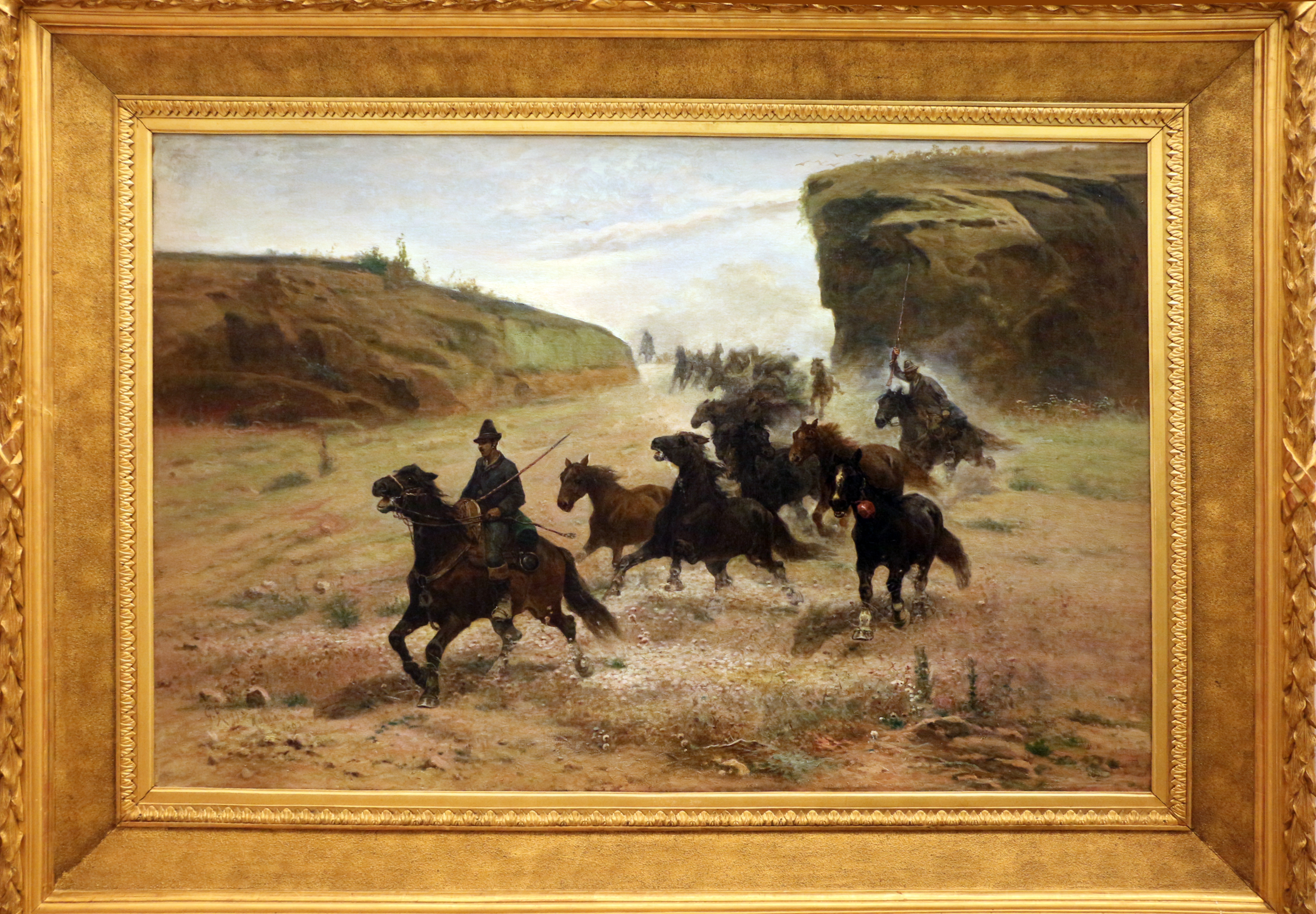
Giuseppe Raggio, Cappata di cavalli nella campagna romana, 1892, Genova, GAM

He was born in Chiavari, and while his father wished him to join the merchant marine, by 1845 he had decided to study painting, and participated in his first exhibition in Genoa. He enrolled in the Accademia di Belle Arti of Florence, where he studied under the neoclassical painter Giuseppe Bezzuoli. By 1846, he became friends with Giovanni Fattori and painters of the Macchiaioli movement who frequented the Caffè Michelangiolo. In 1848, amid the revolutionary turmoil, Raggio moved to Rome.

In Rome, he met the painter of agrarian subjects, Nino Costa. While he continued to paint some religious subjects such as a Holy Family (1854, Genoa) and a Samaritan (1862), Raggio by 1860 favored scenes of cattle farming in the Lazio countryside sa subject matter for his paintings. His Bufali (1860) at the Palazzo Pitti in Florence marks this change. In 1865 at Dublin, he exhibited Campagna Romana.

He painted in oil and watercolor. In 1880 in Turin, he exhibited Bovi che vanno all' aratro; at the 1881 Exhibition of Milan, tratto della Campagna romana; in 1883 in Rome, La malaria and Jolillius; and at the 1884 National Exhibition of Turin, Pellegrinaggio di ciociare at Rome alla visita di San Pietro. Other paintings include: Bufalo alla palude; Mandria di bovi; All'abbeveratoio; Paesaggio romano; Scena campestre e Solitudine; Un duello interrotto: Costume romano; Cavallari romani; and La pastura nelle campagne romane.

For a 1913 exhibition, the painter and art critic Sartorio spoke of Raggio as a

man of simple nature, a believer, who does not know what the world owes to the value of his genius... bypassed and excluded between two generations of painters... (he is an) Artist not to budging an inch from the convictions which he had set himself, and his paintings, from a young age to today, have only one character, a single focus: to tell the story of the humble inhabitants of the Roman Campagna in communion with the herds of sheep and cows. He depicts views of the town devastated by floods and cataclysms, desolate with fever, and in which living descendants of those aborigines, who conserve the seeds of Ancient Rome, and of the right of Catholic morality. The population while poor and stray, maintains the innate goodness, spirituality, generous and fantastic, and fair in his humility, this has pleased the Ligurian painter.

In 1915, he was knighted in the Order of the Crown of Italy. Due to his advanced state of poverty, a commission from the Società Economica di Chiavari, composed of Pietro Gaudenzi, Giuseppe Canevelli, and Luigi Brizzolara, approached him to buy some of his works at a reasonable price. He died by October of the next year.

Raggio's work has been sold at auction on multiple occasions. The record paid for one of his works was $17, 996 USD for Arab horseman resting outside a mosque, in 2007, at Christies in London.
