= Francesco Carradori =

Italian sculptor

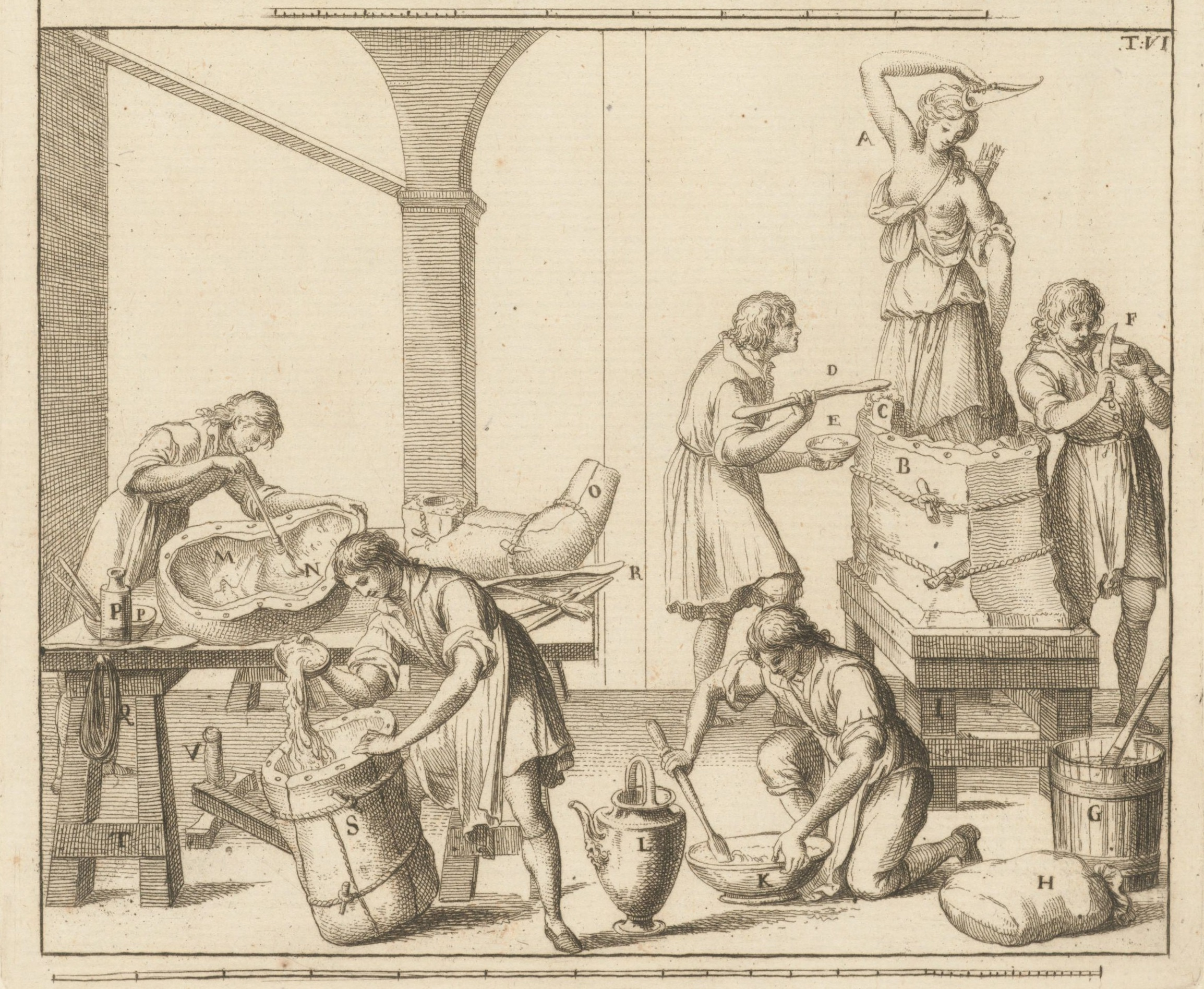
Illustration from Istruzione elementare per gli studiosi della scultura, 1802, by Carradori

Francesco Carradori (1747-1824) was an Italian sculptor in Florence, Italy.

He initially studied in his native Pistoia, under Innocenzo Spinazzi, later, the patronage of the then Grand Duke Leopold sustained him as a pupil of Agostino Penna in Rome. He became the professor of sculpture at the Royal Academy of Fine Arts in Florence. In 1802, he published a guide (Istruzione elementare) for students of sculpture. Among his pupils was Stefano Ricci (sculptor). It is reported that either him or his teacher may have installed the tail of the Chimera of Arezzo incorrectly, causing the Chimera's snake-tail to appear to be biting the Chimera's own goat horns.
