= Juan Mencarini Pierotti =

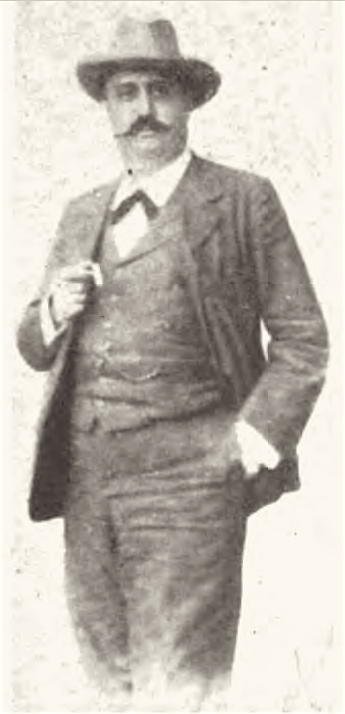
- Portrait of Juan Mencarini, published in the Spanish weekly Por Esos Mundos, (no. 104, 1 September 1903)
- Born: June 11, 1860; Alexandria, Egypt
- Died: April 29, 1939 (aged 78); Manila, Philippines
- Known for: Photography

Juan Mencarini Pierotti (15 June 1860 in Alexandria, Egypt – 29 April 1939 in Manila, Philippines) was a Spanish mid-rank employee of the Chinese Maritime Customs Service between 1881 and 1912. After voluntarily resigning, Mencarini registered an import-export company with base in Shanghai and briefly acted as commercial attaché for the Spanish Consulate in Shanghai. In parallel to his professional career, Mencarini actively participated in a number of cultural and scholarly initiatives, contributing to the development of philately and postal history of East Asia, and amateur photography around 1890

== Biography ==
In 1854, Juan Mencarini's father, Albino Mencarini (Viterbo, 1828 – steamer Oxus, Red Sea, 1886) became interpreter-chancellor at the Spanish consulate in Jerusalem and, in 1860, in Alexandria, where Juan was born from the marriage with Ida Pierotti. Albino obtained the Spanish nationality in 1862, in 1865 was appointed second-class consul at Cairo and, a year after, at Singapore. In 1878, with Albino's appointment as first-class consul at Hong Kong, the Mencarinis began their stay in China.

Juan Mencarini was educated in Madrid and Singapore. In 1881, he was admitted at the Revenue Department of the Chinese Maritime Customs Service in Guangdong province, although he spent his first years at the Inspectorate General in Beijing studying Chinese. In the following years, as was usual practice at the Customs Service, Mencarini changed post in a number of occasions: Xiamen (1883), Tamsui (the port of present-day Taipei, 1884), Shanghai (1889), Fuzhou (1892), Xiamen (1896), Hankou (1900), Shanghai (1903) and again Xiamen (1907), gradually ascending rank from an initial position as 4th Assistant B to that of acting deputy Commissioner. Mencarini's Chinese name was 绵嘉义; pinyin: Mián jiāyì.

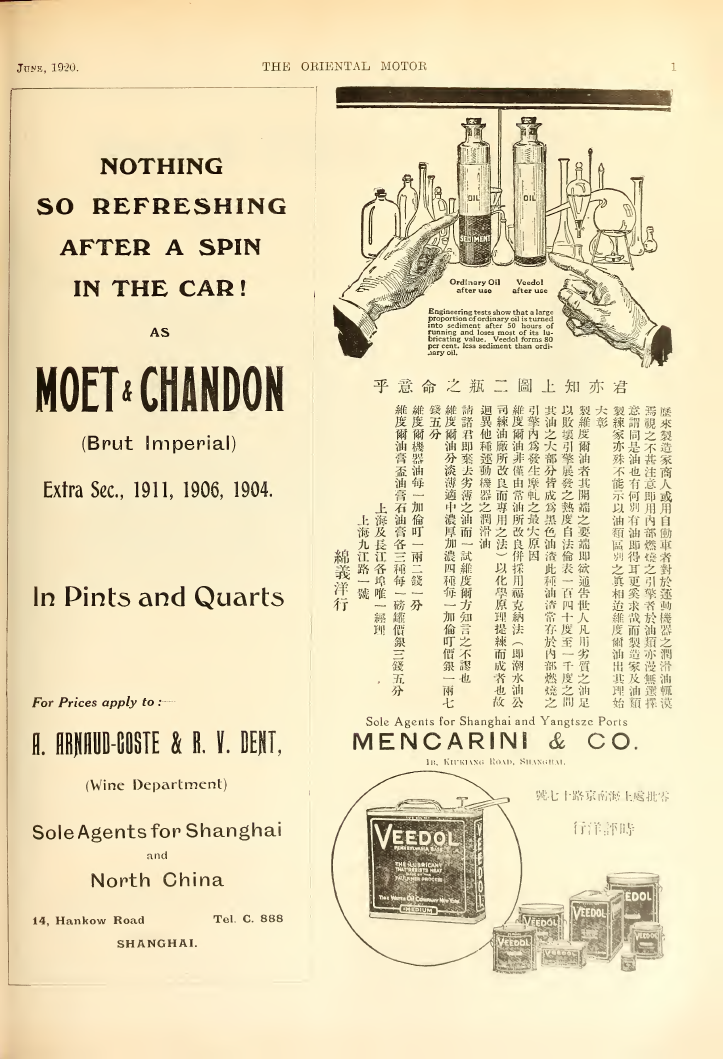
Advertisement of Veedol oil, crediting Mencarini & Co. as "sole agents for Shanghai and Yangtsze ports". Published in Oriental Motor, vol. 2, no.3, June 1920

After voluntarily resigning from the Customs Service in 1912, Mencarini registered an import-export company, Mencarini & Co. (Chinese name 綿義 Mián yì) in Shanghai. Moreover, between 1912 and 1916 he acted as commercial attaché for the Spanish consulate in Shanghai. Over the following years, Mencarini is also credited in official records as owner or partner in different business: raw and manufactured cotton, gold (The National Trading Association Ltd.), real estate and finances (Staple, Wares, Real Estates & Stock Exchange Ltd.).

Along with his wife Rosario Blanco Mendieta (they had married in Manila on 1 March 1886) and their large family, Mencarini abandoned China for good in 1923 and settled in Manila, where he worked as teacher of Chinese to the clerks of the Bureau of Internal Revenue and wrote a Chinese course-book. In Manila, Mencarini founded and presided the Philatelic Association of the Philippines (1925), becoming its honorary president and Life Technical Adviser in 1937. His interest in photography did not decrease, and on 19 August 1928 he took part in the foundation of the Camera Club of the Philippines. Juan Mencarini died in Manila on 29 April 1929.

== Contribution to amateur photography in China ==
Around 1890, Juan Mencarini took part in the foundation of the China Camera Club (影相会; pinyin: Yǐng xiāng huì), the pioneering association of amateur photographers living in Shanghai. Moreover, in November 1892, once appointed to the city of Fuzhou, Mencarini founded the Foochow Camera Club. These clubs provided instruction and entertainment, organized talks about technical matters of photography and exhibitions of their members' photographs.

In this context, Mencarini's photographs were quite celebrated, even obtaining a gold award in the exhibition of the Shanghai Amateur Photographic Society (previously China Camera Club) in February 1905. His photographs illustrated his frequent articles for the Spanish press, and were widely required for albums of mementos of returning expats, such as the American consul Samuel Levis Gracey and the French consul Ernest Frandon, or to illustrate books, such as The Land of the Blue Gown, by Alicia Little.
