= Giuseppe Pierotti =

Italian painter (1826–1884)

Giuseppe Pierotti or Pier Giuseppe Pierotti (1826–1884) was an Italian sculptor and painter. There is an Italian sculptor of the same name from Cuneo.

== Biography ==
Pierotti was born in Castelnuovo di Garfagnana, Province of Lucca. He was a pupil of Giuseppe Bezzuoli and Tommaso Gazzarini at the Academy of Florence. He initially completed paintings of sacred subjects, including a Madonna and Child and a Blessed Simone Carmelitano in 1849. His sculpture of a Wounded Gladiator was awarded the Canonica prize in 1855. He also worked at the sculptural decoration of the Cathedral of Milan.

He then moved to Florence. In 1870 at Parma, he exhibited Un ritratto muliebre, a pastel work. At Milan, in 1872, exhibited Vase of Flowers with symbols of Florence and Portrait of the signora Marianna Grassi. In 1884 at Turin, he displayed St Louis praying in his Chapel, Portrait of a Man, Portrait of a Woman and a bronzed terracotta statuette, depicting Amore preso nella rete.

Pierotti's marble statue of American Indian Attacked by a Boa Constrictor is found in the Irving Zucker Sculpture Garden of the Art Gallery of Hamilton, Canada.

== Partial works of art ==
- San Luigi in preghiera davanti all'altare, oil on board, 90 x 130 cm (1860s). Private collection, Garfagnana.
- Veduta di Firenze da Palazzo Pitti, oil on canvas, 120 × 80 cm (1870s). Private collection, Garfagnana.
- Cosimo Ridolfi con i figli, oil on canvas (1855). Held at Palazzo Medici Riccardi.
- Natura morta con gatto, oil on canvas, 50 x 80 cm. Private collection, Trentino.
- Fiori e Natura Morta, oil on canvas, 61 x 79 cm. Sold at auction in Bloomfield, NJ, US.
- Natura Morta, oil on canvas, 61 x 79 cm. Sold at auction in Bloomfield, NJ, US.
- Vista campagne Toscane (1872), oil on canvas, private collection, Garfagnana, Tuscany.

== Gallery ==
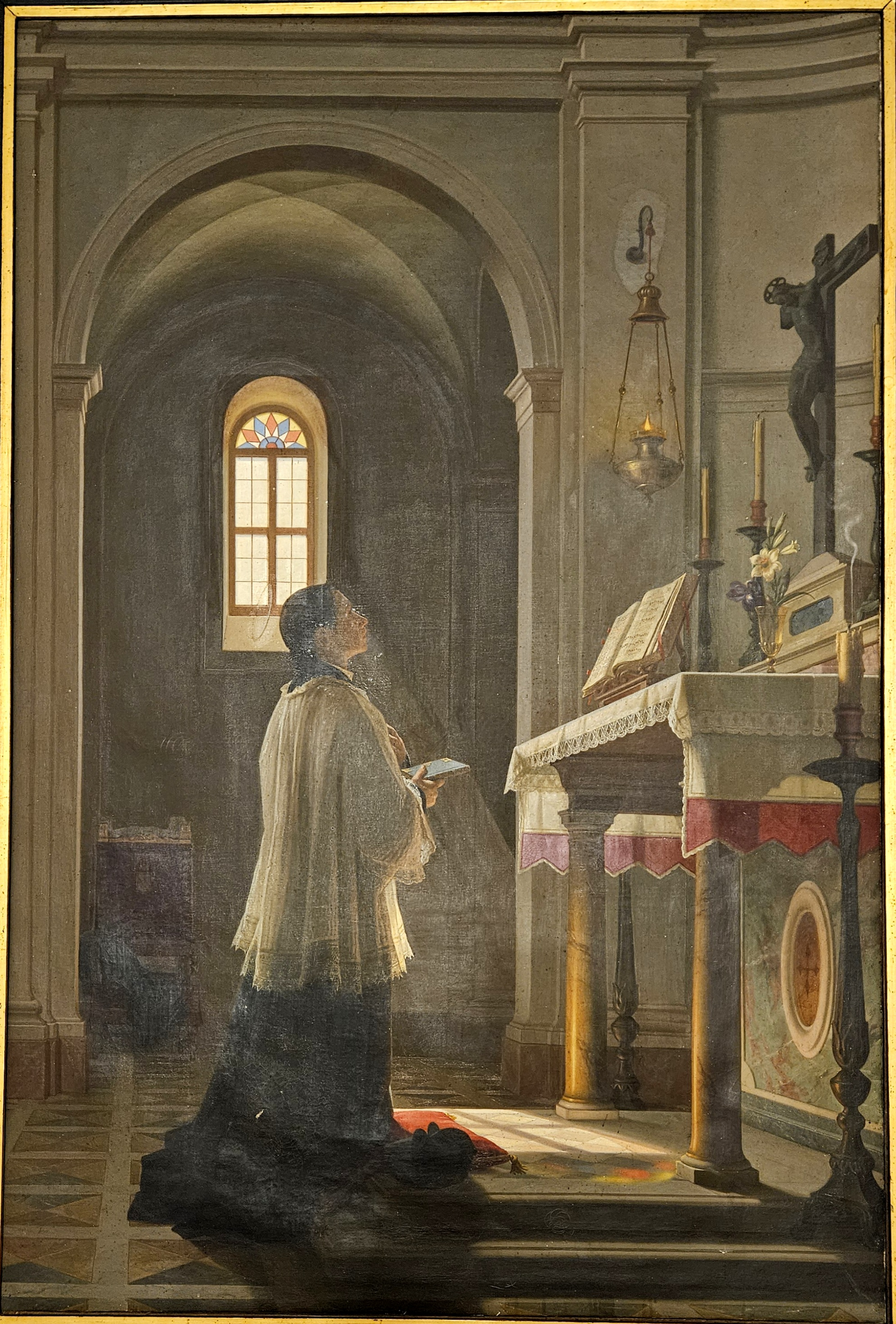
San Luigi in preghiera davanti all'altare (1860)

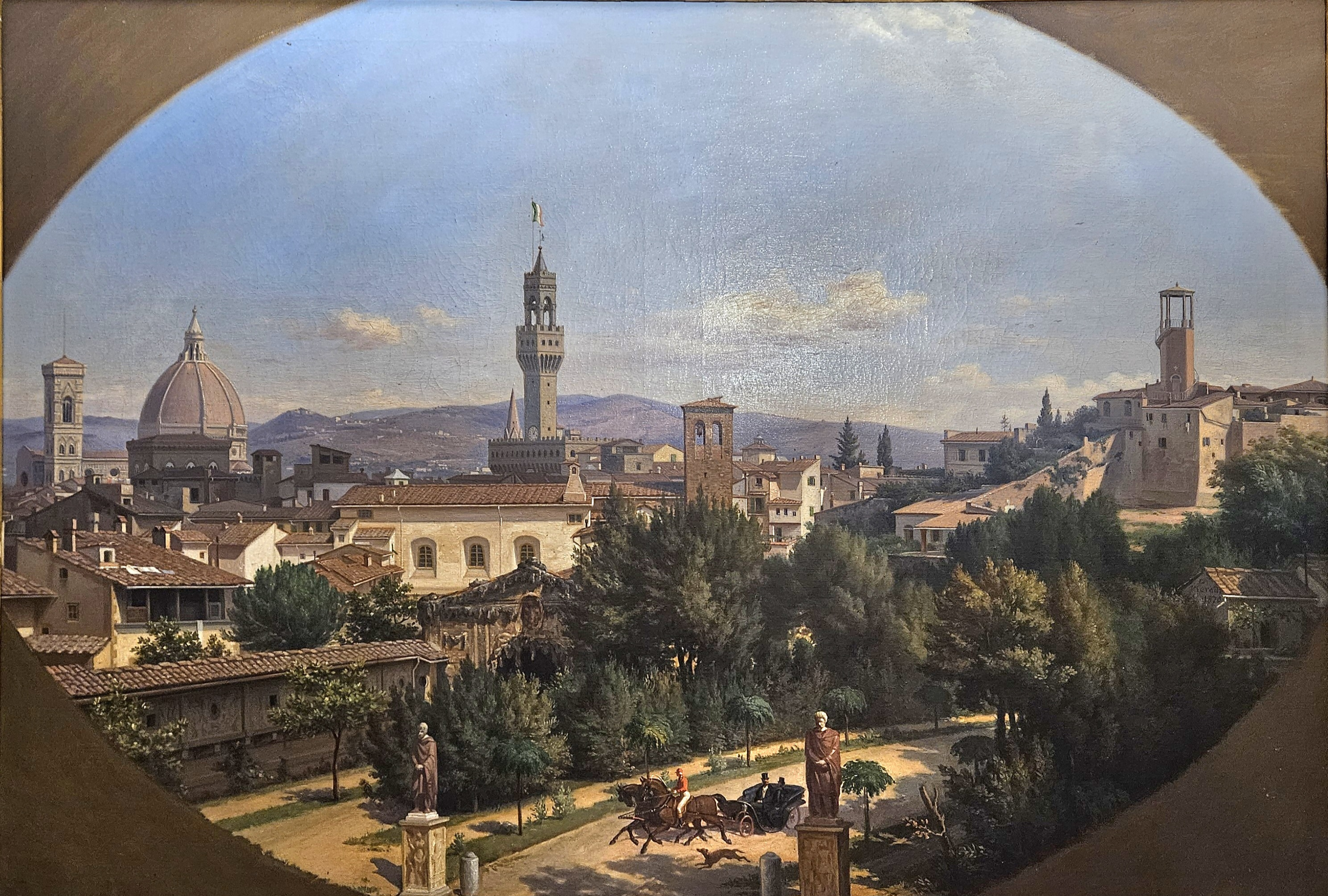
Veduta di Firenze da Palazzo Pitti (1870)

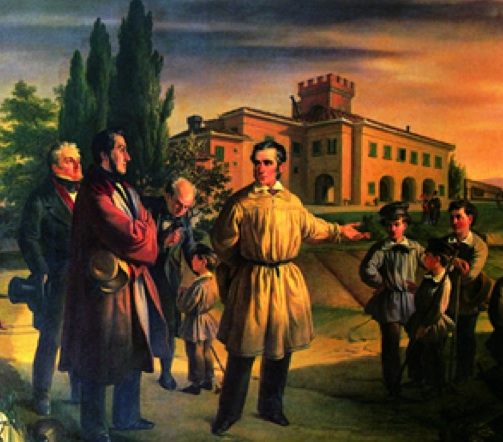
Cosimo Ridolfi con i figli

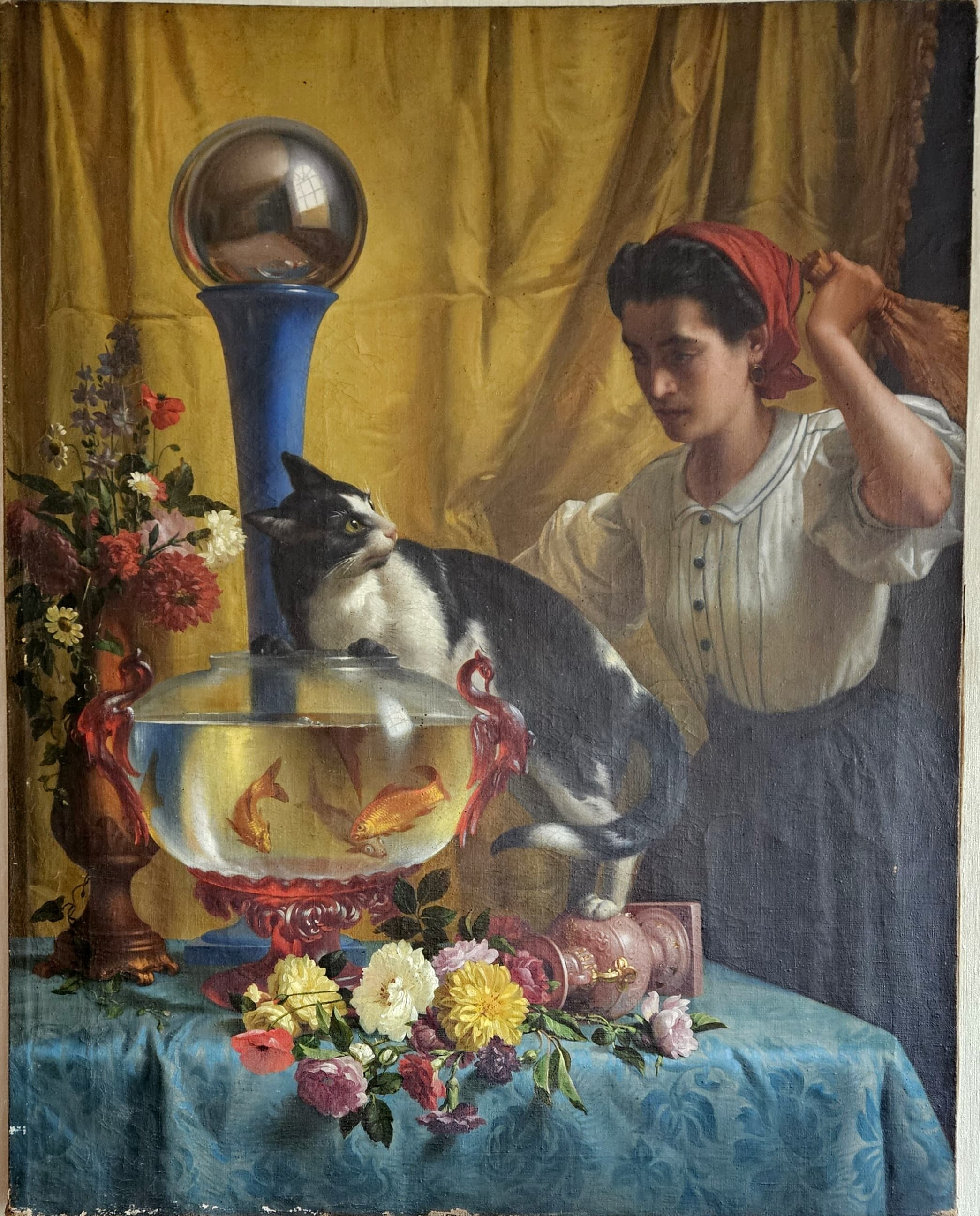
Natura morta con gatto

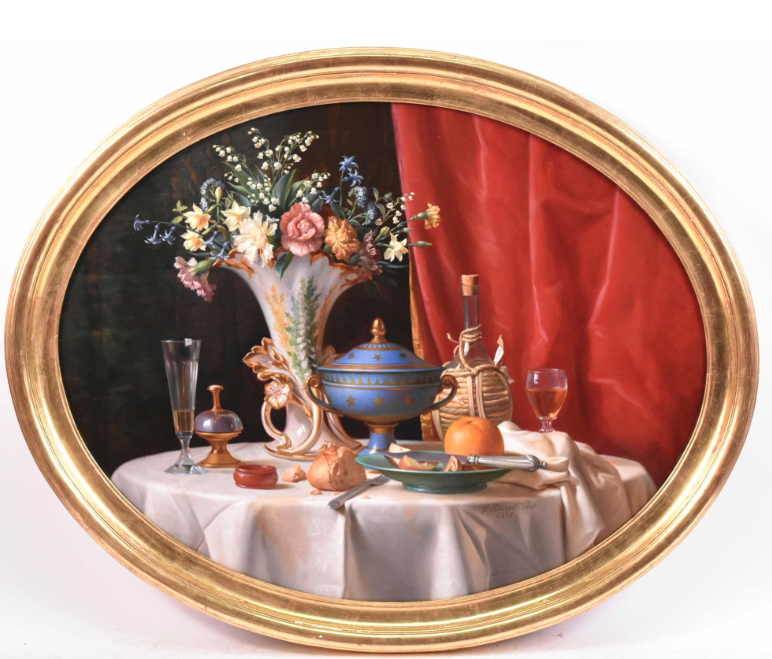
Fiori e natura morta (1870)

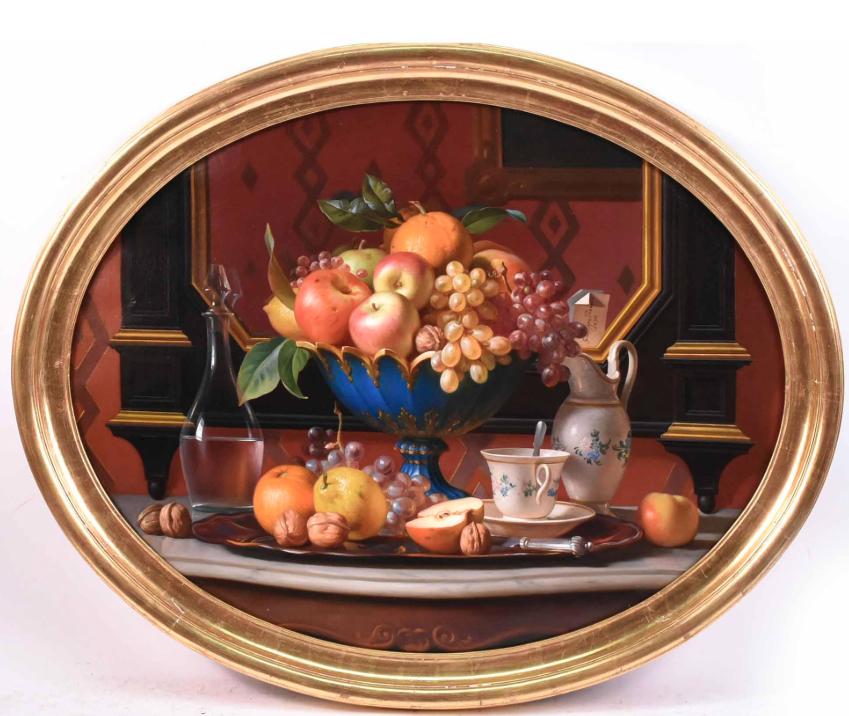
Natura Morta (1870)

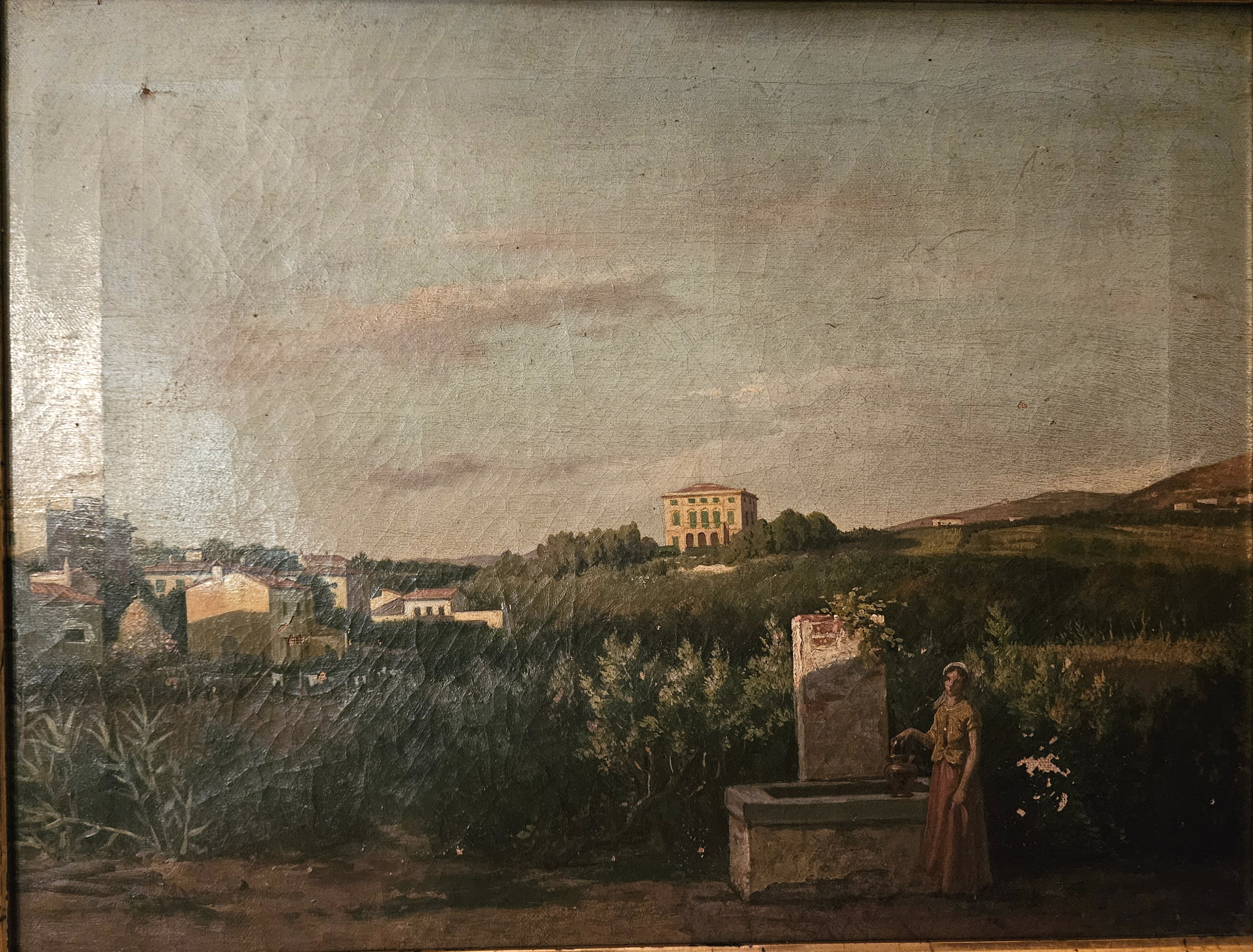
Vista campagne toscane
