= Giuseppe Bezzuoli =

Italian painter (1784–1855)

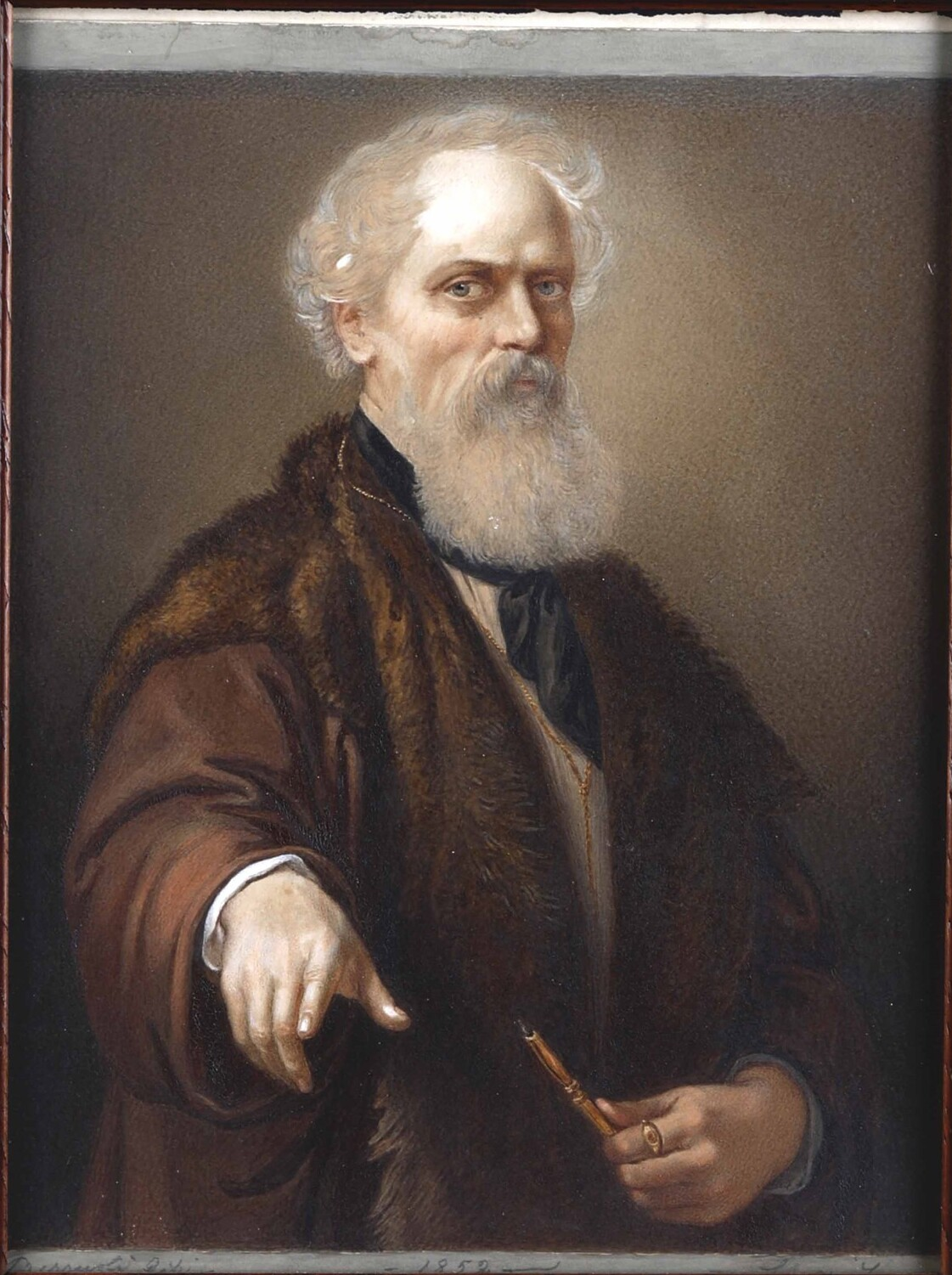
- Self-portrait (1852)
- Born: 28 November 1784; Florence, Grand Duchy of Tuscany
- Died: 13 September 1855 (aged 70); Florence, Grand Duchy of Tuscany
- Known for: Painting
- Notable work: The Baptism of Clovis (1823); Entry of Charles VIII into Florence (1829)
- Movement: Neoclassicism; Romanticism

Giuseppe Bezzuoli (28 November 1784 – 13 September 1855) was an Italian painter of the Neoclassical and Romantic periods.

== Biography ==
He was born to Luigi Bazzuoli, a farmer, and his wife Anna, née Banchieri. Later, he changed the spelling of his name to "Bezzuoli", to match that of an old Florentine noble family.

In 1796, at the age of twelve, he was admitted to the Academy of Fine Arts. There, he studied drawing and painting with Jean-Baptiste Desmarais, Pietro Pedroni, and Gaetano Piattoli. After 1803, he was a private student of Pietro Benvenuti. In 1812, he won the Academy's Triennial Prize, which enabled him to go to Rome, to study and copy the Old Masters. During this time, he travelled to several other cities to execute commissions for portraits and historical works.

Returning to Florence in 1816, he completed fresco cycles at the Palazzo Pucci (Francesca da Rimini), and the Palazzo Pitti (Alexander the Great). His large painting, The Baptism of Clovis (1823) marks a turn from Classicism to Romanticism. Other notable paintings from the 1820s include a portrait of Lorenzo Bartolini (1825), a depiction of Venus, which was displayed at the "Exposition des produits de l'industrie française" of 1827, and The Entry of Charles VIII into Florence (1829), which was commissioned by Grand Duke Leopold II of Tuscany. That same year, his former teacher Benvenuti hired him as an assistant.

In 1836, he began another series of frescoes at the Palazzo Pitti, with scenes from the life of Julius Caesar. Two years later, on a commission from Prince Anatoly Demidov, he created a large canvas depicting the discovery of King Manfred's body after the Battle of Benevento. In 1839, he decorated a lunette for the new Tribune of Galileo at the National History Museum with a scene showing Galileo experimenting with gravity.

This work resulted in his becoming a professor at the Academy in 1844, to replace the late Benvenuti. During this period, he focused on commissioned portraits, including politicians such as Bettino Ricasoli, and writers such as Giuseppe Giusti. In 1853, a portrait of the recently deceased Austrian general, Julius Jacob von Haynau, created some controversy, as he had been involved in violently suppressing some of the Revolutions of 1848 in the Italian states. His last exhibition was at the Exposition Universelle of 1855, where he presented several paintings with religious themes.

Among his pupils at the Academy were Giovanni Fattori, Giuseppe Raggio, Enrico Pollastrini, Carlo Ademollo, Giuseppe Pierotti, Stefano Ussi, Silvestro Lega, and Adeodato Malatesta; as well as the Americans William Edward West and Edwin White.

== Selected works ==
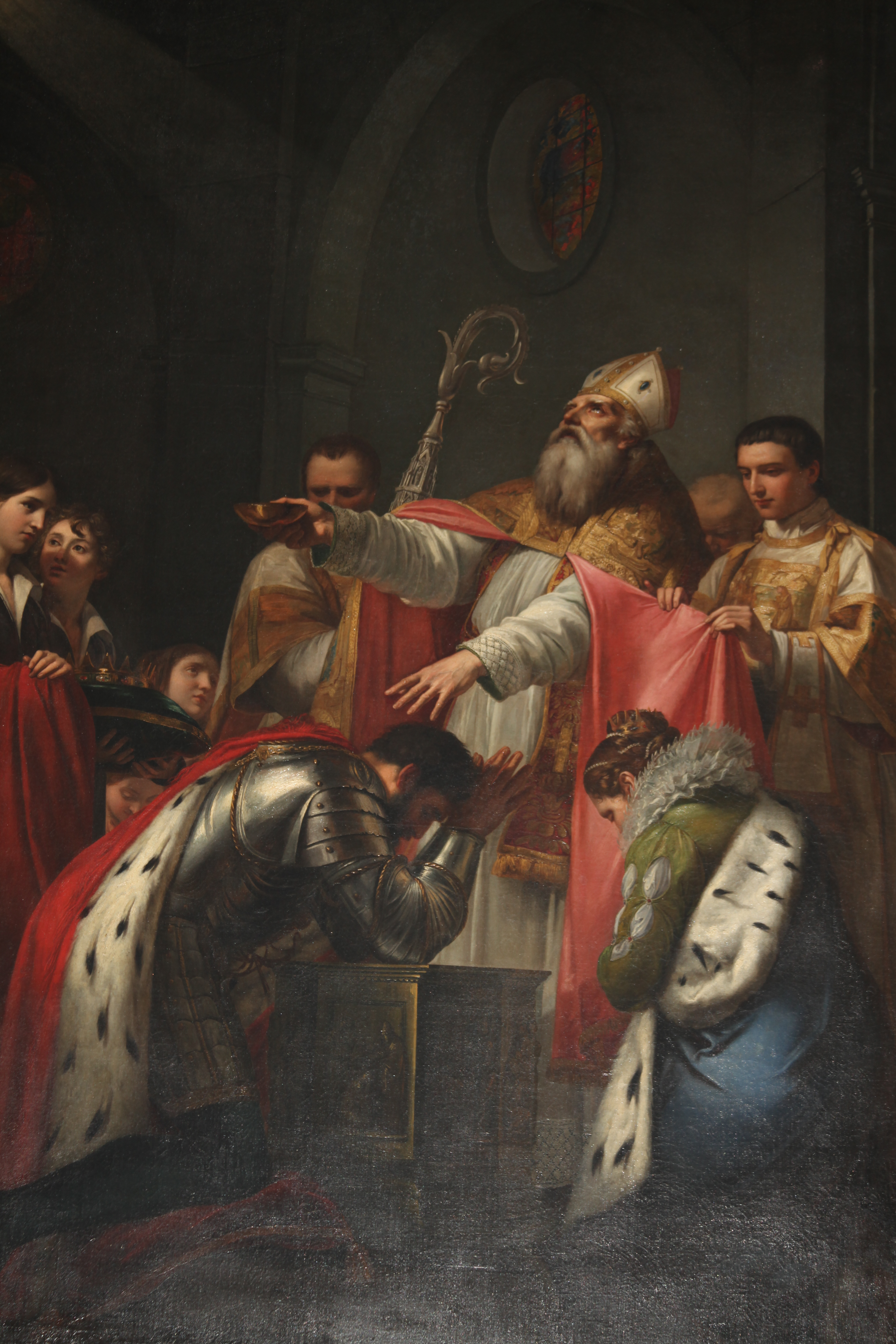
Saint Remigius Baptizing King Clovis

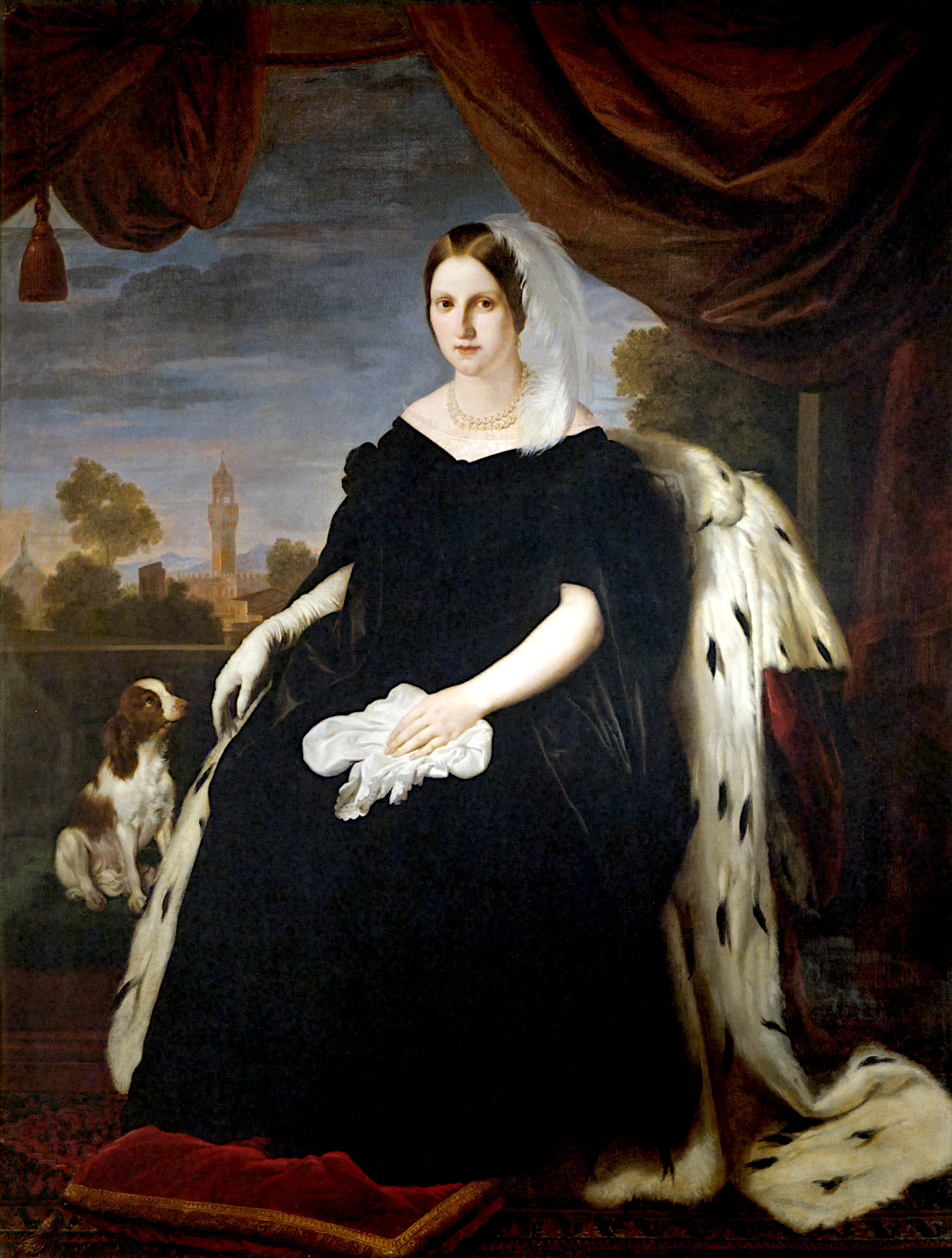
Princess Maria Antonia of the Two Sicilies

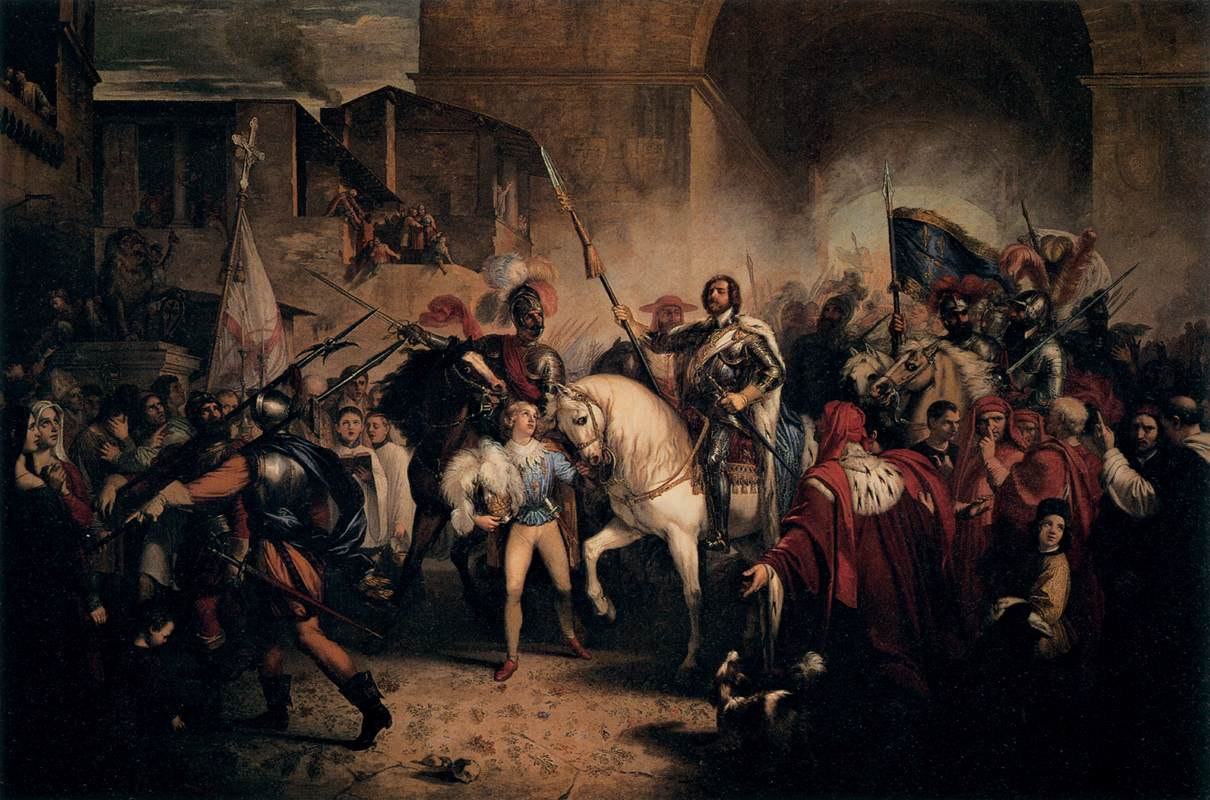
The Entrance of Charles VIII into Florence, 1829

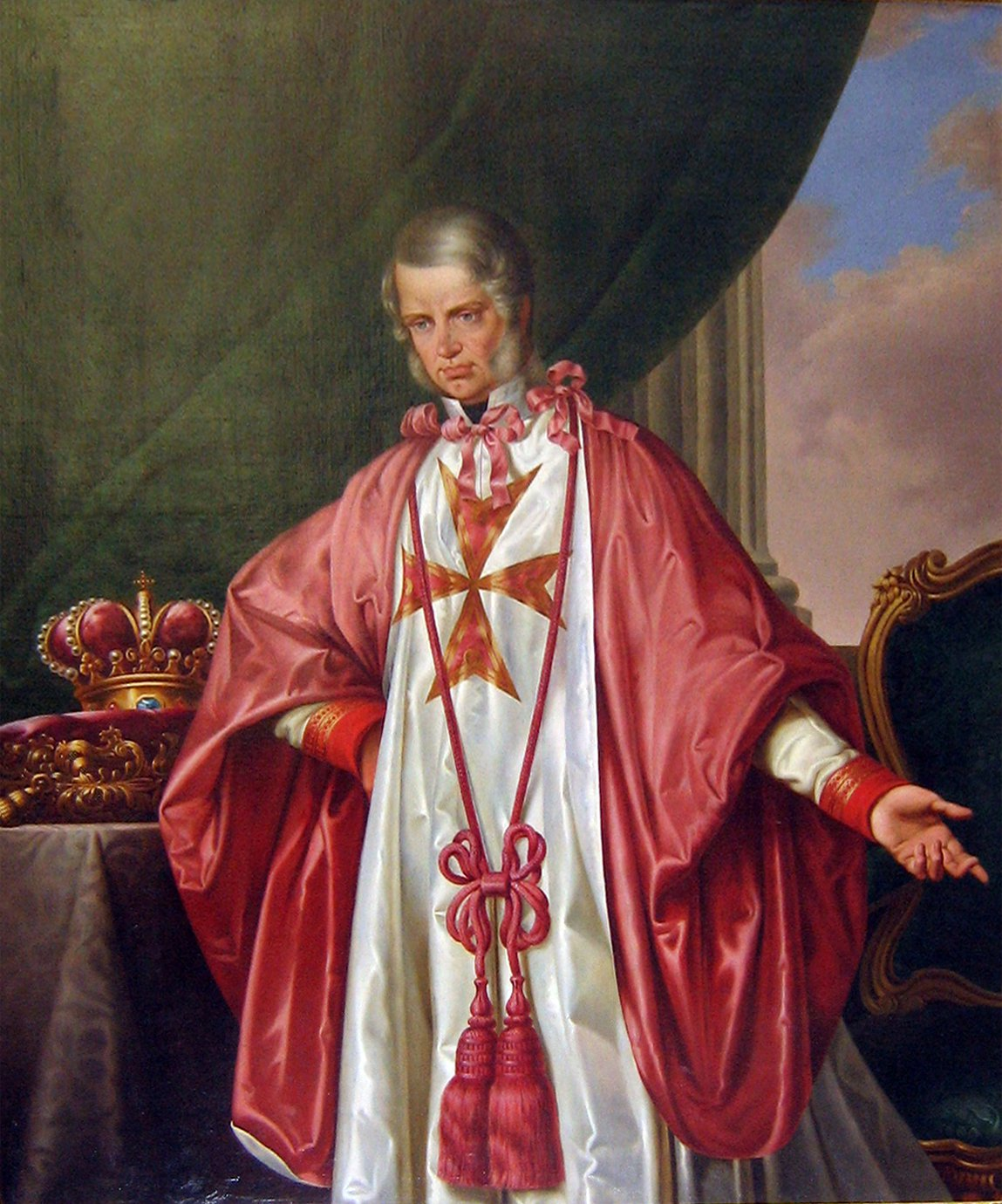
Grand Duke Leopold II
of Tuscany

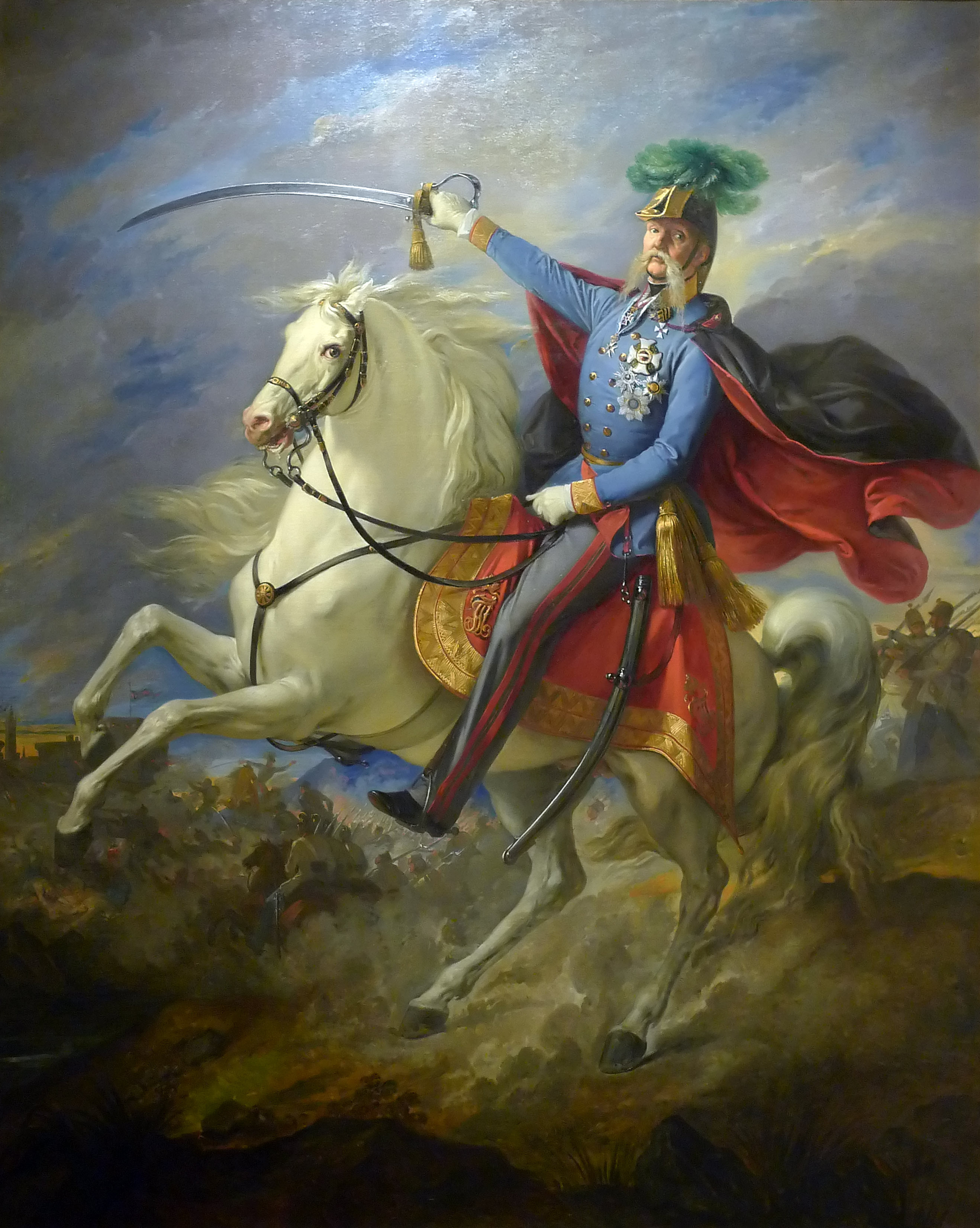
Julius von Haynau
