= Angelo Maria d'Elci =

Italian classical philologist (1751–1824)

Angelo Maria d’Elci
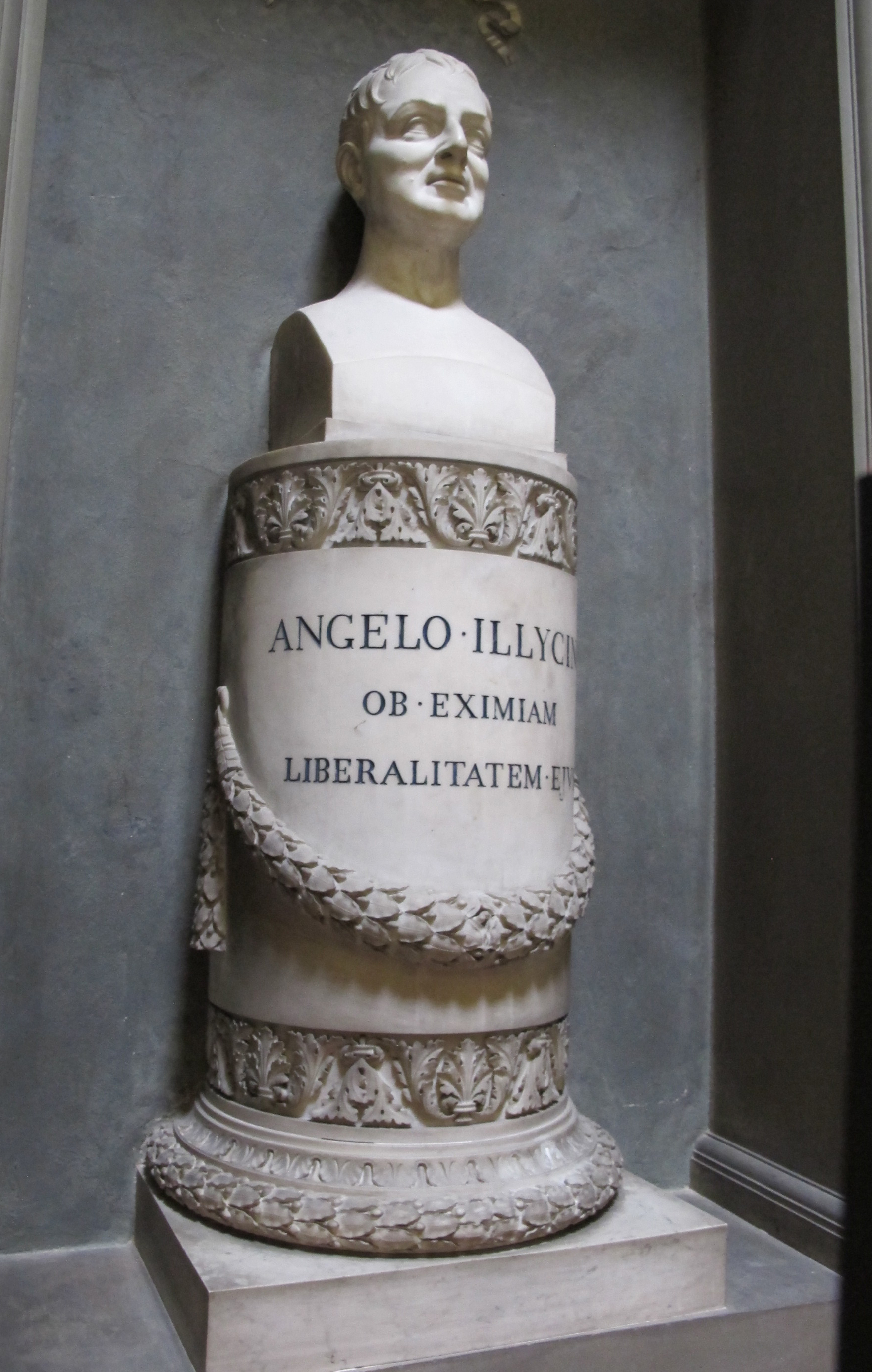
- Bust by Stefano Ricci in the Biblioteca Laurenziana, Florence
- Born: Angelo Maria Giuseppe Ambrogio Pannocchieschi d'Elci; 2 October 1751; Florence, Grand Duchy of Tuscany
- Died: 20 October 1824 (aged 73); Vienna, Austrian Empire
- Occupations: Classical philologist; Bibliophile
- Spouse: Marianna Zizendorf (m. 1809)

Angelo Maria d’Elci (Latin: Angelus Illycinus; born 2 October 1751 in Florence; died 20 October 1824 in Vienna) was an Italian classical philologist and bibliophile.

== Biography ==
Angelo Maria d'Elci was born in Florence on 2 October 1751 to Marquis Ludovico Pannocchieschi of the Counts d'Elci and Marchioness Lucrezia Niccolini. Hailing from an aristocratic Sienese family, in 1780, he entered the Sovereign Military Order of Malta, although he did not take religious vows. From his youth, he dedicated himself to the study of the classics and of modern languages (French, English and German). He travelled widely through Germany, France and England. He visited Paris, Vienna, Prague and Berlin for the first time in 1783. He returned to Paris in 1788 and subsequently travelled to London, where he stayed for several months, following the classic itinerary of an 18th-century scholarly tour.

An accomplished scholar, d'Elci represented the reactionary as well as the neoclassical tendencies of his age. While his works, especially his Italian satires, were widely read, he had somewhat strained relations with contemporary intellectuals such as Alfieri and Foscolo. De'Elci was a member of the Accademia della Crusca, which awarded him a prize of one thousand scudi for his Satires.

During his life D'Elci amassed a collection consisting of over 1,100 rare volumes, specifically editiones principes (first printed editions) of ancient Greek and Roman authors, including several incunables a complete set of Aldine editions, and a collection of first editions of biblical texts. In 1818, he gifted his entire book collection to the Laurentian Library. To accommodate this substantial donation, the Neoclassical architect Pasquale Poccianti designed a dedicated rotunda known as the Tribuna d'Elci, which was added to the Laurentian Library complex designed by Michelangelo in the 16th century.

After his marriage with Countess Marianna Zizendorf, d'Elci settled in Vienna, where he lived until his death. On 17 November 1809, he was appointed a chamberlain to the emperor of Austria. He died in Vienna on 20 November 1824, aged 73. His bust, sculpted by Stefano Ricci, is housed in the Tribuna d'Elci in the Biblioteca Laurenziana. His most notable philological work is his edition of Lucan's Pharsalia, published in Vienna in 1811 in a large folio format. D'Elci emended Lucan's text, drawing upon two 12th-century manuscripts that were barely known before he consulted them.

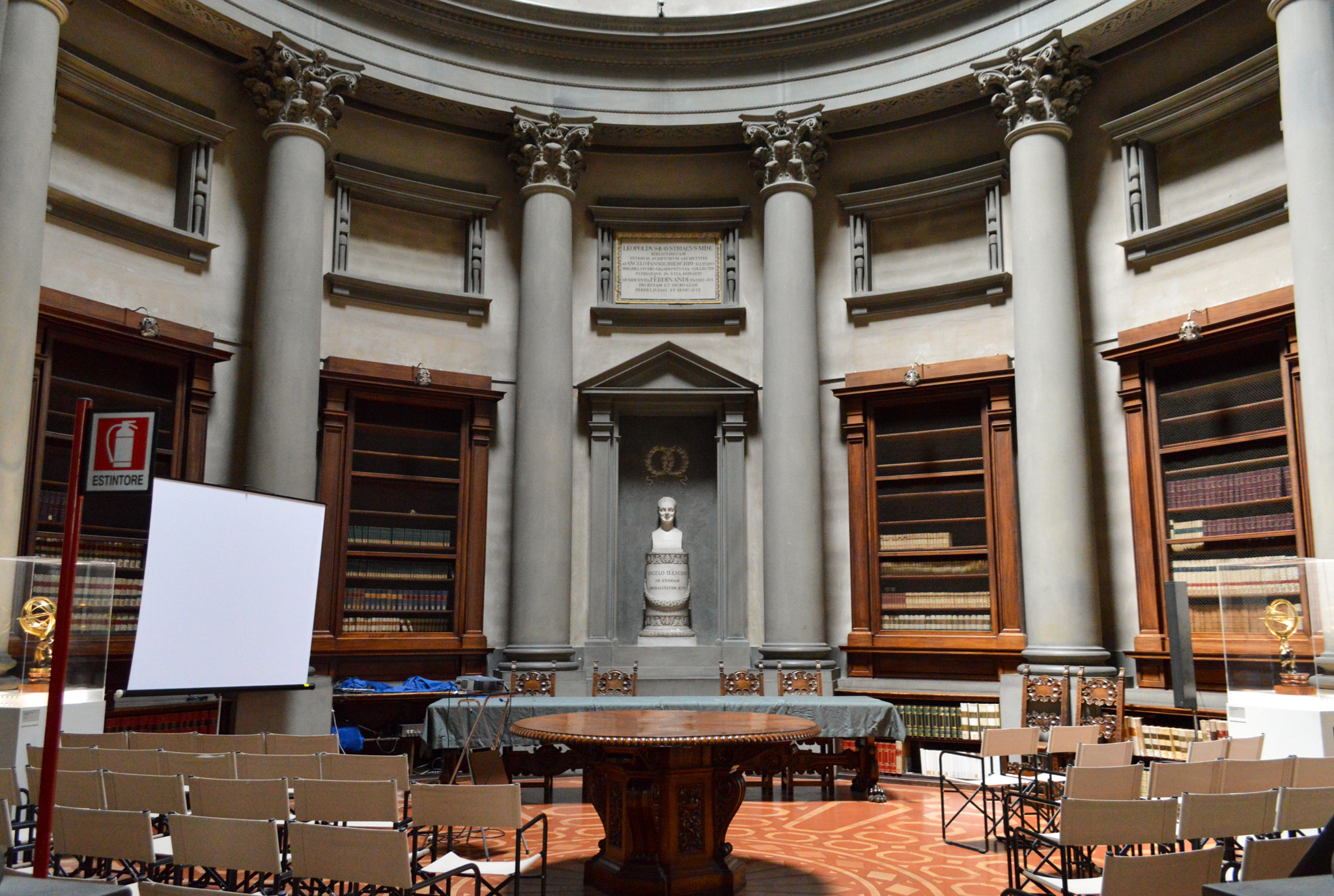
Tribuna d'Elci in the Biblioteca Laurenziana.

Dome of the Tribuna d'Elci

== Bibliography ==
- Niccolini, Giovanni Battista (1841). "Memorie su la Vita e su le Opere di Angiolo d'Elci". Satire, epigrammi, epitaffi e poesie latine di Angiolo d'Elci. Milan: Silvestri. pp. III–XVI.
- Rao, Giovanna (2014). "PANNOCCHIESCHI d'ELCI, Angelo Maria". Dizionario Biografico degli Italiani (in Italian). Vol. 80: Ottone–Pansa. Rome: Institute of the Italian Encyclopaedia. ISBN 978-88-12-00032-6.
- Rao, Ida Giovanna (1991). "Per la biografia di Angelo Maria d'Elci" [Toward a biography of Angelo Maria d'Elci]. Archivio Storico Italiano (in Italian). 149 (2): 375–449. JSTOR 26217915.
- "D'Elci, Angelo Maria". In: Österreichisches Biographisches Lexikon 1815–1950 (ÖBL). Vol. 1, Austrian Academy of Sciences, Vienna 1957, p. 175.
