= Luigi Giovannozzi =

Italian sculptor

Luigi Giovannozzi (1791 - 1870) was an Italian sculptor, active mainly in Florence in a Neoclassical style.

He was born in Settignano, son of a sculptor Ottavio Giovannozzi. His brother Francesco was also a sculptor. Luigi became a pupil of Lorenzo Bartolini. He was elected honorary academic of the Florentine Academy of Fine Arts in 1870.

Among his works are:

- Sculpture of the monument in Santa Croce to the Countess of Albany, Princess Louise of Stolberg-Gedern, widow of Charles Edward Stuart
- Decorations for the tomb of Elizabeth Barrett Browning in the Protestant Cemetery, Florence
- Decorations for the Tribune of Galileo
