= Innocenzo Spinazzi =

Italian sculptor

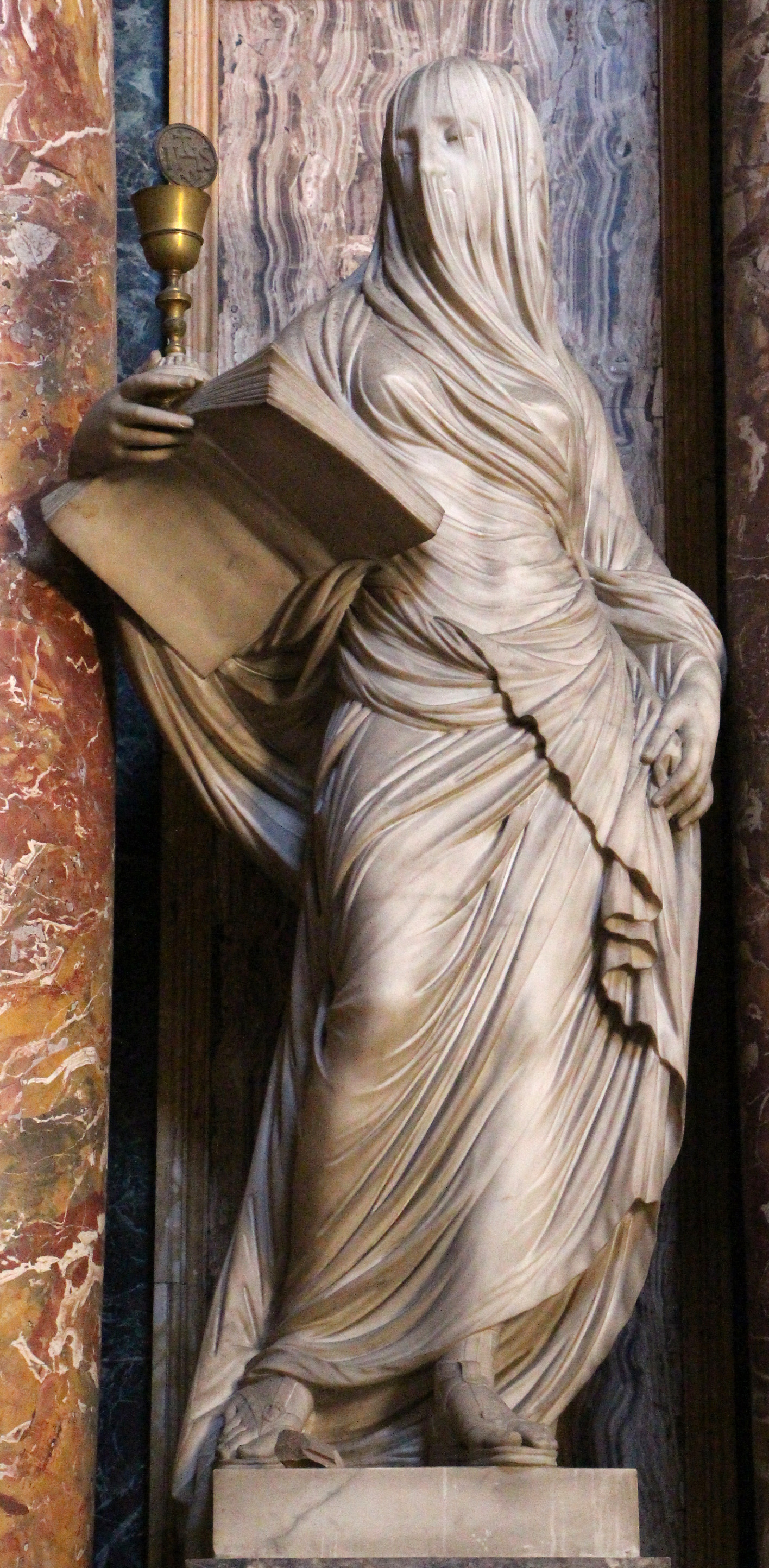
Faith, Santa Maria Maddalena de' Pazzi, Florence

Innocenzo Spinazzi (1726–1798) was an Italian sculptor of the Rococo period active in Rome and Florence.

== Biography ==
Born in Rome the son of a silversmith, he became the leading sculptor in Florence, where he died. He was trained by Giovanni Battista Maini. In Rome, he completed the statue of St Joseph Calasanctius (1755) for the nave of St Peter's Basilica.

He arrived in Florence in 1769, and the next year was named official court sculptor for the Lorraine dynasty in 1770. Grand Duke Leopold (later Emperor Leopold II) first employed him to restore antique sculpture. He completed a portrait bust of the Grand Duke (1771–74; Pitti). Spinazzi contributed monuments to three celebrated Florentines for the church of Santa Croce: jurist Giovanni Lami (died 1770); Angelo Tavanti (died 1782); and author Niccolò Machiavelli (1787). In 1792 he added an angel to the Baptism by Andrea Sansovino and Vincenzo Danti above the Porta del Paradiso of the Baptistery of Florence.

His virtuoso marble figures of heavily veiled women, for example Faith (1781; Santa Maria Maddalena de' Pazzi) and Religion (from the tomb of Varvara Jakovlevna, Princess Beloselskij, 1794; Turin, Museo Civico), follow precedents set by Antonio Corradini and Giuseppe Sanmartino in the Capella Sansevero of Naples. Spinazzi was professor of sculpture at the Academy of Fine Arts, Florence, from 1784. One of pupils was Francesco Carradori. He died at Florence in 1798.

== Sources ==
- Grove art encyclopedia entry on Artnet
- WGA biography
