= Replicas of Michelangelo's David =

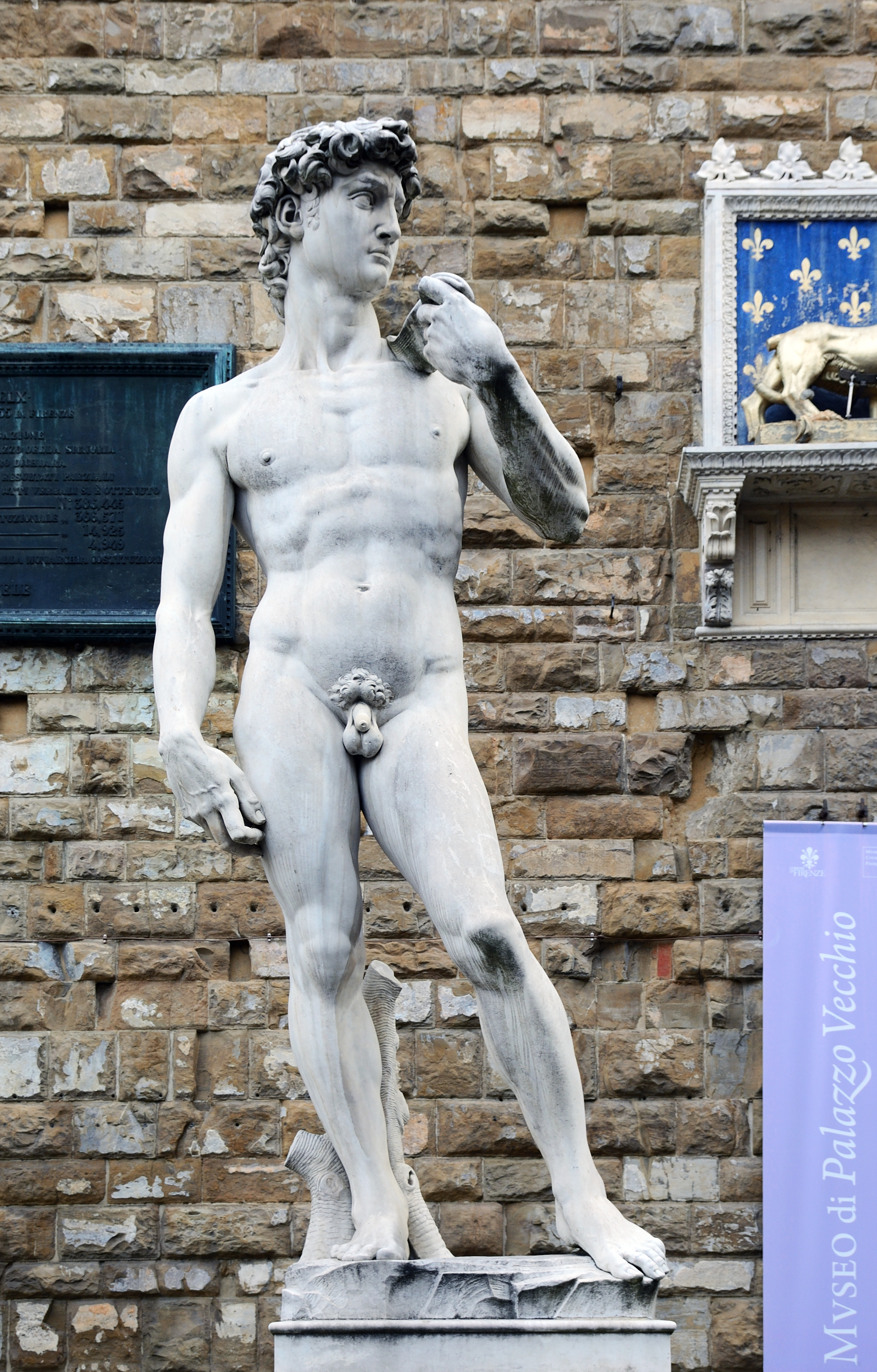
Replica of David in the sculpture's original position, in front of the Palazzo Vecchio, Florence

Michelangelo's David have been made replicas for numerous times, in plaster, imitation marble, fibreglass, snow, and other materials. There are many full-sized replicas of the statue around the world, perhaps the most prominent being the one in the original's position in the Piazza della Signoria in Florence, Italy, placed there in 1910. The original sculpture was moved indoors in 1873 to the Accademia Gallery in Florence, where it attracts many visitors. Others were made for study at art academies in the late nineteenth century and later, while the statue has also been replicated for various commercial reasons or as artistic statements in their own right. Smaller replicas are often considered kitsch.

== Asia ==
- In India, a replica installed at the Administrative Building of the University of Pune is a legacy of the British Raj.
- In 1995, a replica of David was offered as a gift by the municipality of Florence to the municipality of Jerusalem to mark the 3,000th anniversary of David's conquest of the city. The proposed gift evoked a storm in Jerusalem, where religious factions urged the gift be declined, because the naked figure was considered pornographic. Finally, a compromise was reached and another, fully clad replica of a different statue (David by Verrocchio) was donated instead.
- In Korea, Hallym University, a replica of David was installed in front of the library.
- In Dubai, Italy Pavilion in Expo 2020, a 3D printed replica of David was installed in the pavilion as an exhibit. The statue is visible to the public only from the head up, owing to the respect of the UAE's Islamic culture.

== Australasia ==
- A 7m tall Carrara marble replica of David can be viewed at Emerald Lakes, Queensland in the suburb of Carrara, Queensland.
- A replica of David can be found at the Moreland Hotel, in Brunswick, Victoria.

== Europe ==
- The bronze cast of David in Piazzale Michelangelo, Florence, is flanked by casts of the reclining figures in the Medici Chapel.
- A plaster cast copy in the Cast Courts at the Victoria and Albert Museum in London was intended for the education of art students, and had a detachable fig leaf, used for added modesty during visits by Queen Victoria and other important ladies, when it was hung on the figure using two strategically placed hooks.
- There is a cast in Park Den Brandt in Antwerp.
- Pushkin Museum in Moscow
- A bronze cast stands in front of the Kongelige Afstøbningssamling, the Danish Royal Cast Collection at the Langelinie Promenade in Copenhagen, though it could not be placed more prominently due to misspelling the artist as "Michel Angelo" in the plaque.
- In 2007, Märklin produced a Z scale (1:220) bronze replica of the statue, which stood approximately 1.6 inches (41 mm) tall. The statue accompanied the "museumswagen" for that year, a collector car offered in the Märklin museum in Göppingen to celebrate the German foundry Strassacker.
- In 2016, Nadey Hakim produced a bronze bust of the statue. The replica is permanently exhibited at the Monterchi Museum, Italy. The museum is the home of the renowned Madonna del Parto which is Piero della Francesca's most famous piece.
- In 2018, the technology brand Samsung reimagined Michelangelo's David as a domestic god standing on top of a washing machine as part of an advertising campaign which toured the parks and plazas of London.
- Replica of the statue can be found in the streets avenue du Prado in Marseille, France, close to the sea. It was done by sculptor Jules Cantini in 1903.
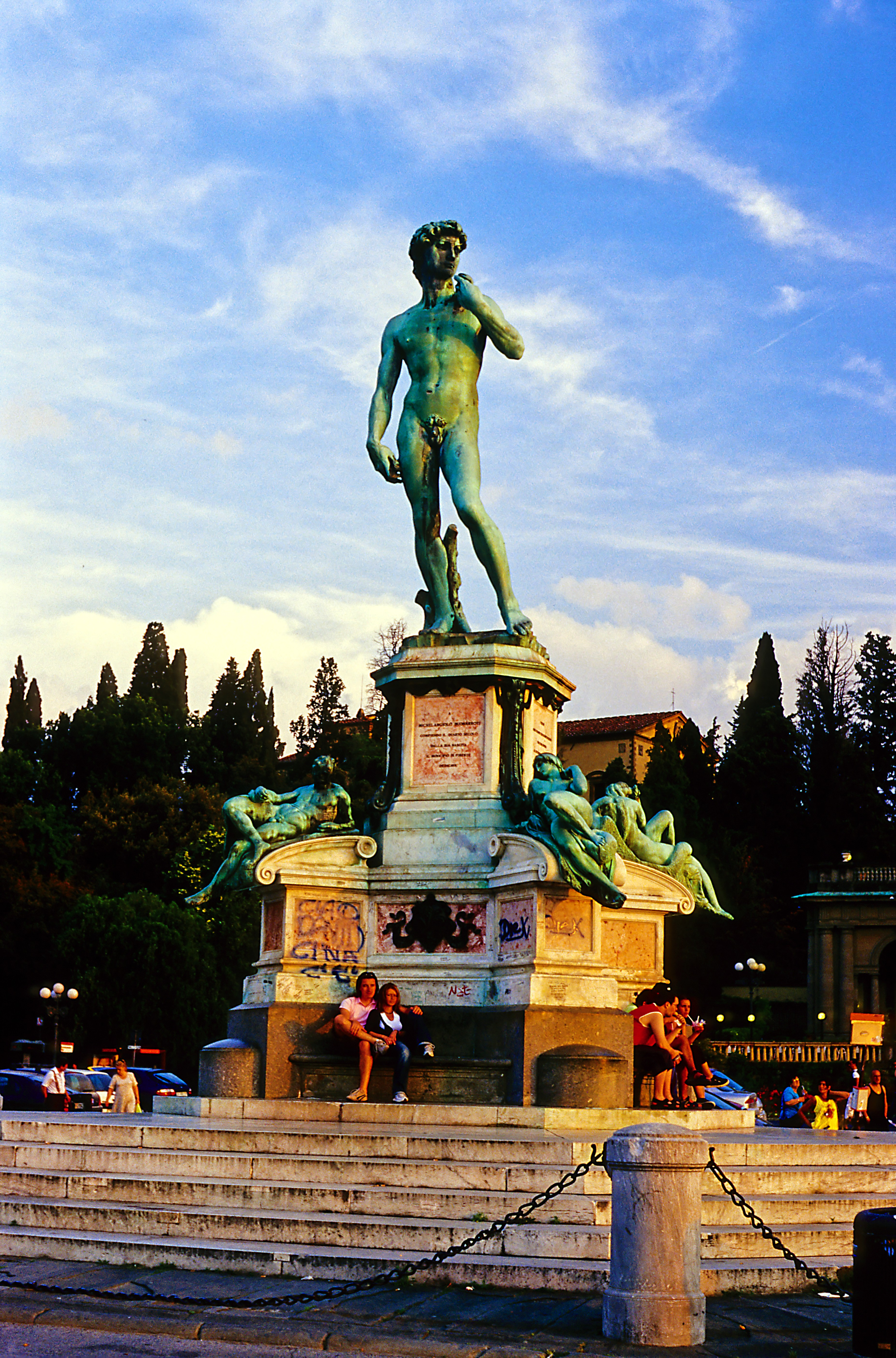
Piazzale Michelangelo, Florence

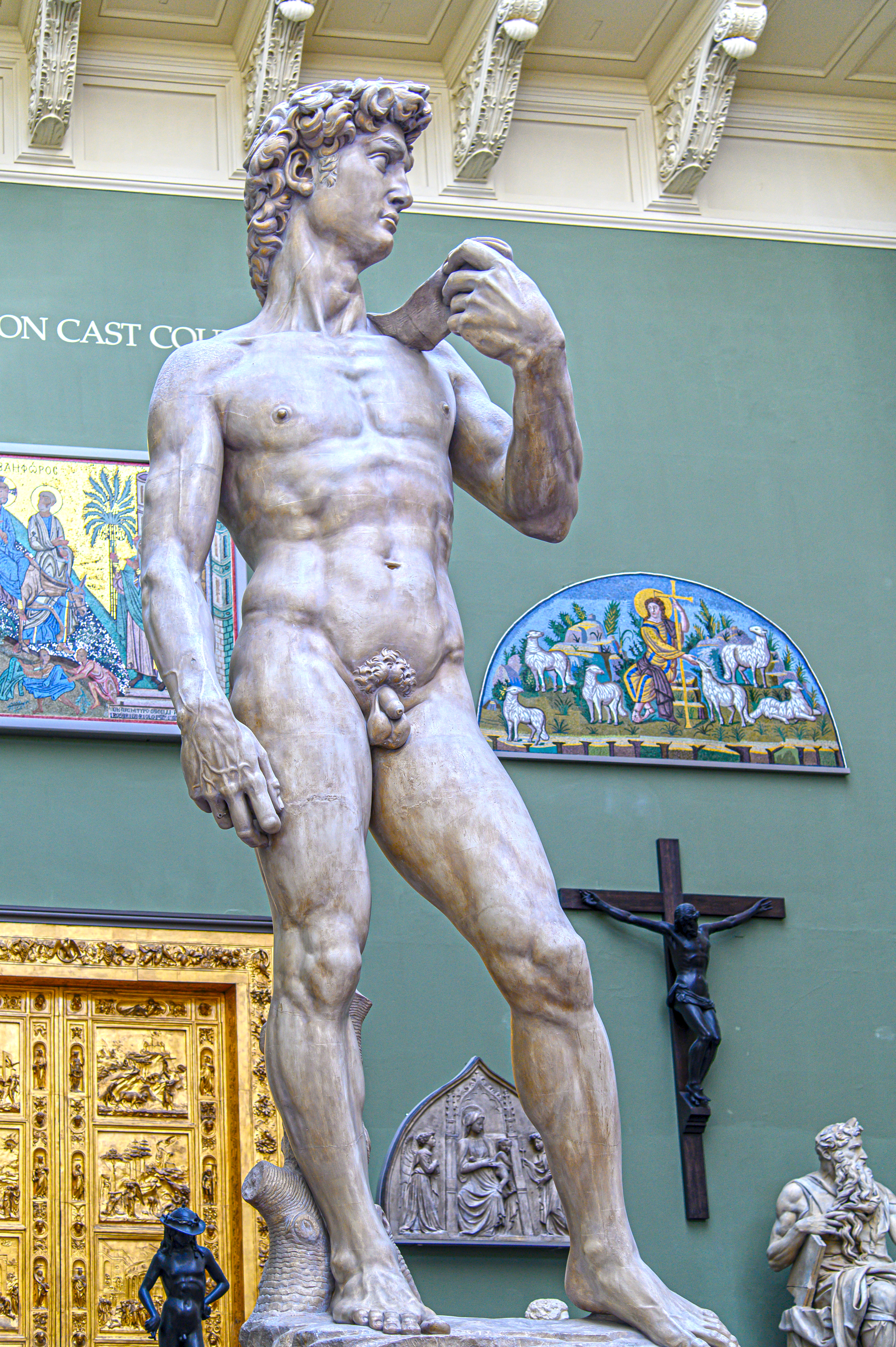
Victoria and Albert Museum, London

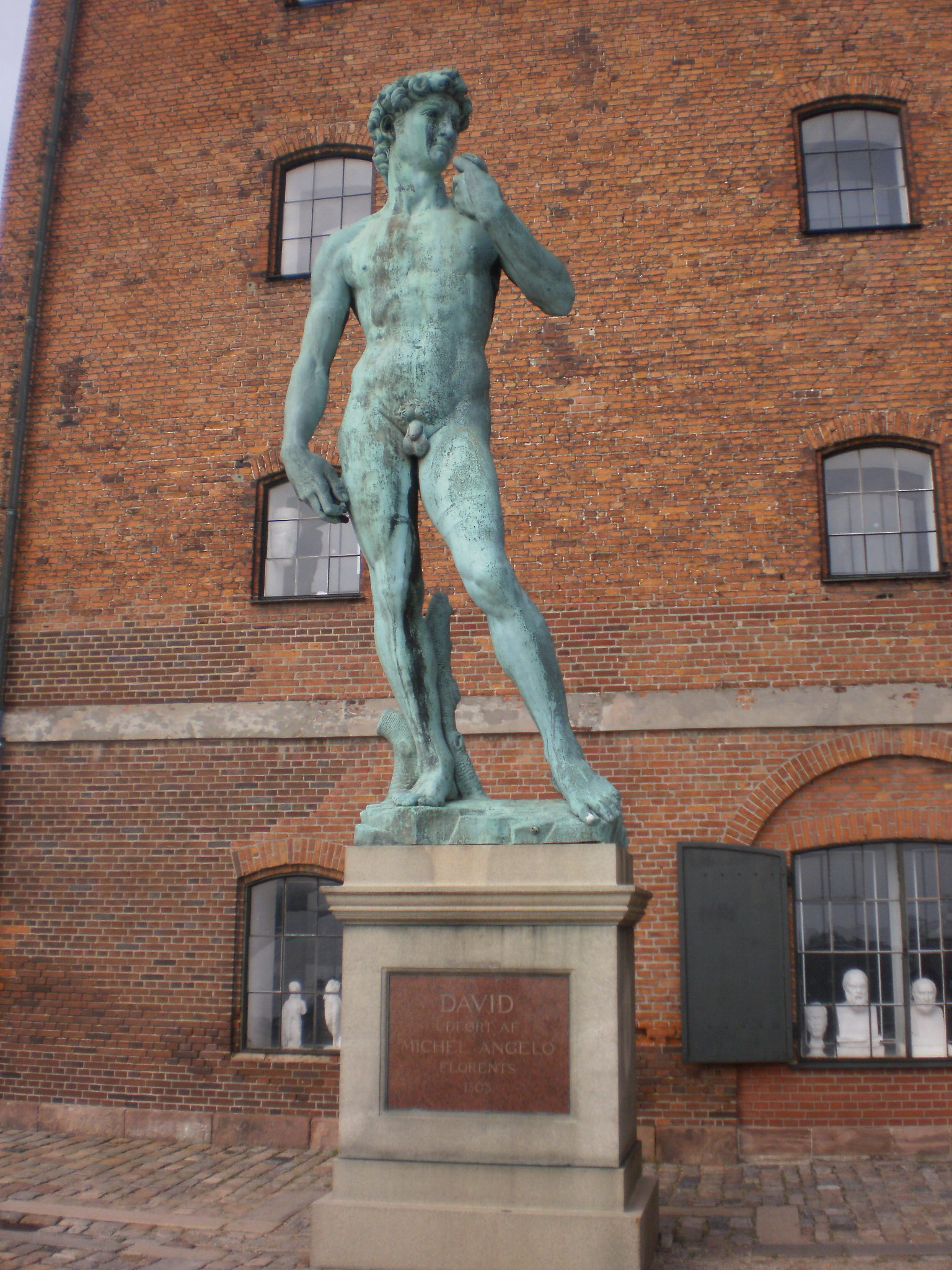
Langelinie Promenade, Copenhagen

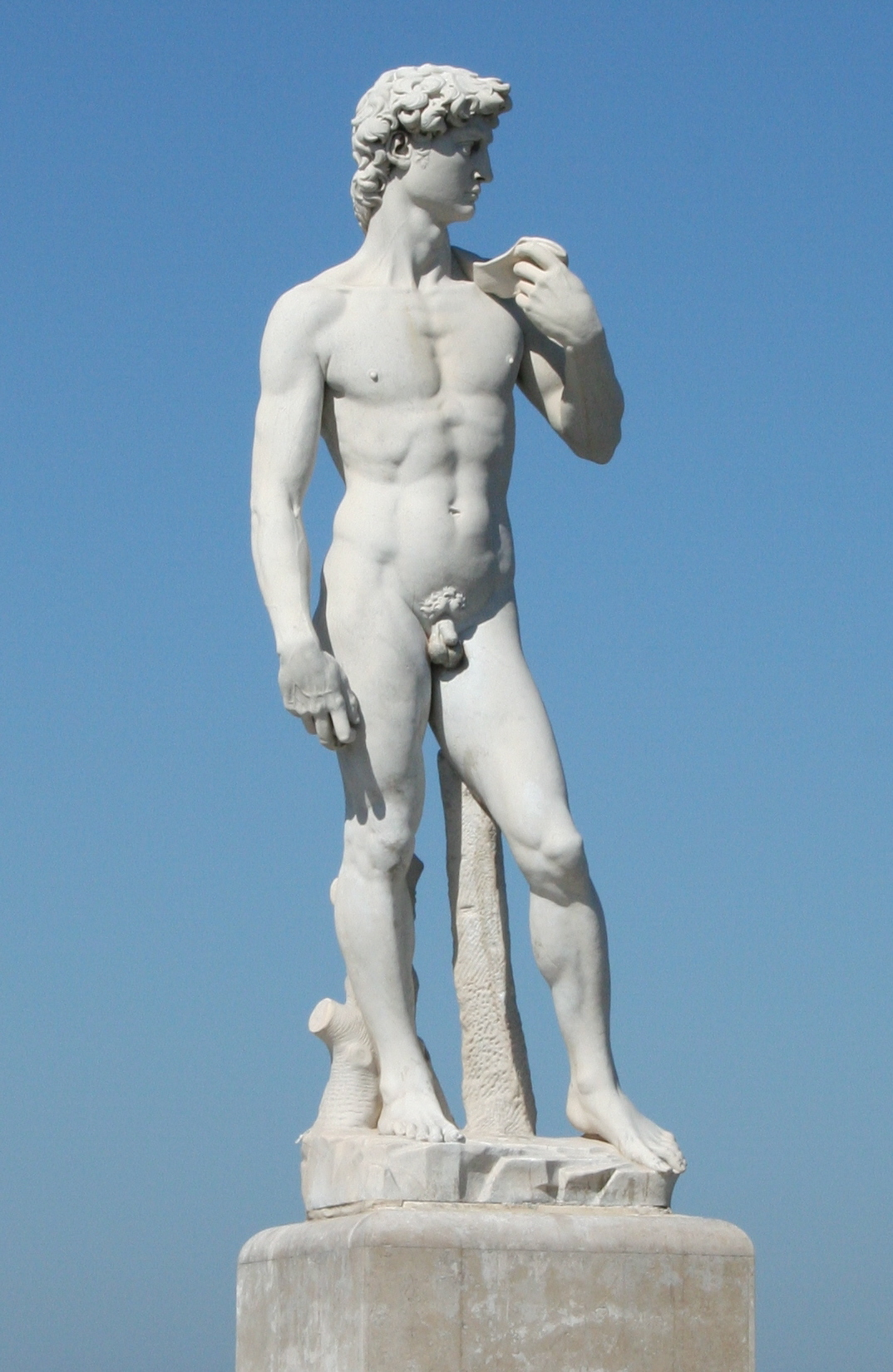
Avenue du Prado, Marseille (1903)

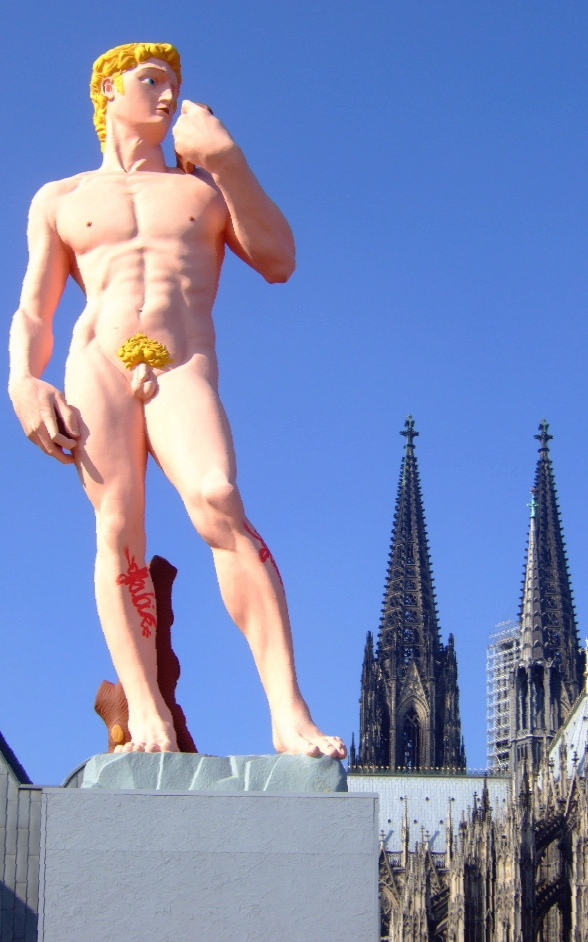
Hans-Peter Feldmann, David (2006) in Cologne – since 2010 in Duisburg

== North America ==
- A bronze full-scale replica of David was presented to the City of Buffalo, New York, and the Buffalo Historical Society by Andrew Langdon, a businessman and scholar. Langdon had seen the statue on exhibit at the Paris Exposition of 1900; negotiating with the Neapolitan firm of bronze founders who had cast it (Sabatino De Angelis and Sons), he bought it and exacted an agreement that they would not send another to the United States. The statue now stands in Delaware Park. In recent years, the City of Buffalo Arts Commission has contracted with Russell Marti Conservation Services to conserve and color the bronze. While in the early 20th century a fig leaf covered a portion of the statue, the fig leaf was later removed to reveal the entire masterpiece.
- A bronze copy can be found in the Plaza Río de Janeiro of Mexico City's Colonia Roma. It has become a symbol of the neighborhood.
- A scale replica can be found at the Pennsylvania Academy of the Fine Arts in Philadelphia. It is in the school's older building which primarily functions as a museum, but has several casts for the students' use.
- Also intended for students was the cast in the Philadelphia Museum of Art.
- A bronze replica stands in the courtyard of the John and Mable Ringling Museum of Art in Sarasota, Florida.
- There is a full-scale replica of David on the campus of California State University, Fullerton that lies broken in pieces on the ground. It was brought from Forest Lawn Memorial Park in Cypress to campus by a professor in 1988 after it was damaged in the 1987 Whittier Narrows earthquake. Visitors often touch the remains of the sculpture for tactile study or, in a new student tradition, the dislocated but upturned butt for good luck on final exams.
- Three replicas of David once stood at the Forest Lawn Memorial Park in Glendale, California. The most recent David toppled in 2020 due to design flaws and deterioration. It replaced an earlier version which stood from 1971 to its toppling from the Northridge earthquake in 1994. The current David is cast out of bronze and was installed in 2021.
- Also in southern California, a resident of the Hancock Park neighbourhood in Los Angeles has decorated his house and grounds with twenty-three reduced scale replicas of the statue, all retaining different facial expressions.
- A replica may be found at the "Appian Way Shops" at Caesars Palace in Las Vegas, Nevada.
- In 1971, Thomas L. Fawick gifted a bronze replica of the statue to the city of Sioux Falls, South Dakota, which stands in Fawick Park.
- In 1965, David Sollazzini and Sons of Florence, Italy created a Carrara marble replica for the Palace of Living Art at the Movieland Wax Museum in Buena Park, California. The marble used for this replica was taken from Michelangelo's own quarry near Pietrasanta. This replica was later sold to Ripley Entertainment for the Ripley's Believe It or Not! Museum in St. Augustine, Florida.
- In 1966, Mike Caffee created a plaster statue for the gay leather bar Febe's on Folsom Street in San Francisco. Known as the Leather David, the statue reimagined Michelangelo's David as a 1960s gay biker. It became widely reproduced in plaster and bronze at bars across the United States. Caffee's original is held by the GLBT Historical Society Museum. A copy is on display at the Leather Archives & Museum.
- In 2004, as part of Stanford University's Digital Michelangelo Project, a highly accurate 15 inch replica was made by Gentle Giant Studios mechanically reproducing their digital scans of the original. Ignoring the advice of an Italian sculptor to soften the features of a reduced-scale copy "otherwise, it appears precious and cartoony", the results were felt to be satisfactory, if "angular when viewed in person, especially around his face."
- David (inspired by Michelangelo), by the Turkish conceptual artist Serkan Özkaya, is a gold-painted foam reproduction of the statue, twice the size of the original, originally created for the 9th International Istanbul Biennial in 2005, accidentally destroyed during installation, recreated, and now in the collection of the 21c Museum Hotel in Louisville, Kentucky. (Another copy is located in Eskişehir, Turkey).
- Exhibition of a replica of David began on 7 January 2023, in the Soumaya Museum in Mexico City, Mexico. This exact copy was handcrafted by Florentine artists and was certified by the Galleria dell'Accademia.
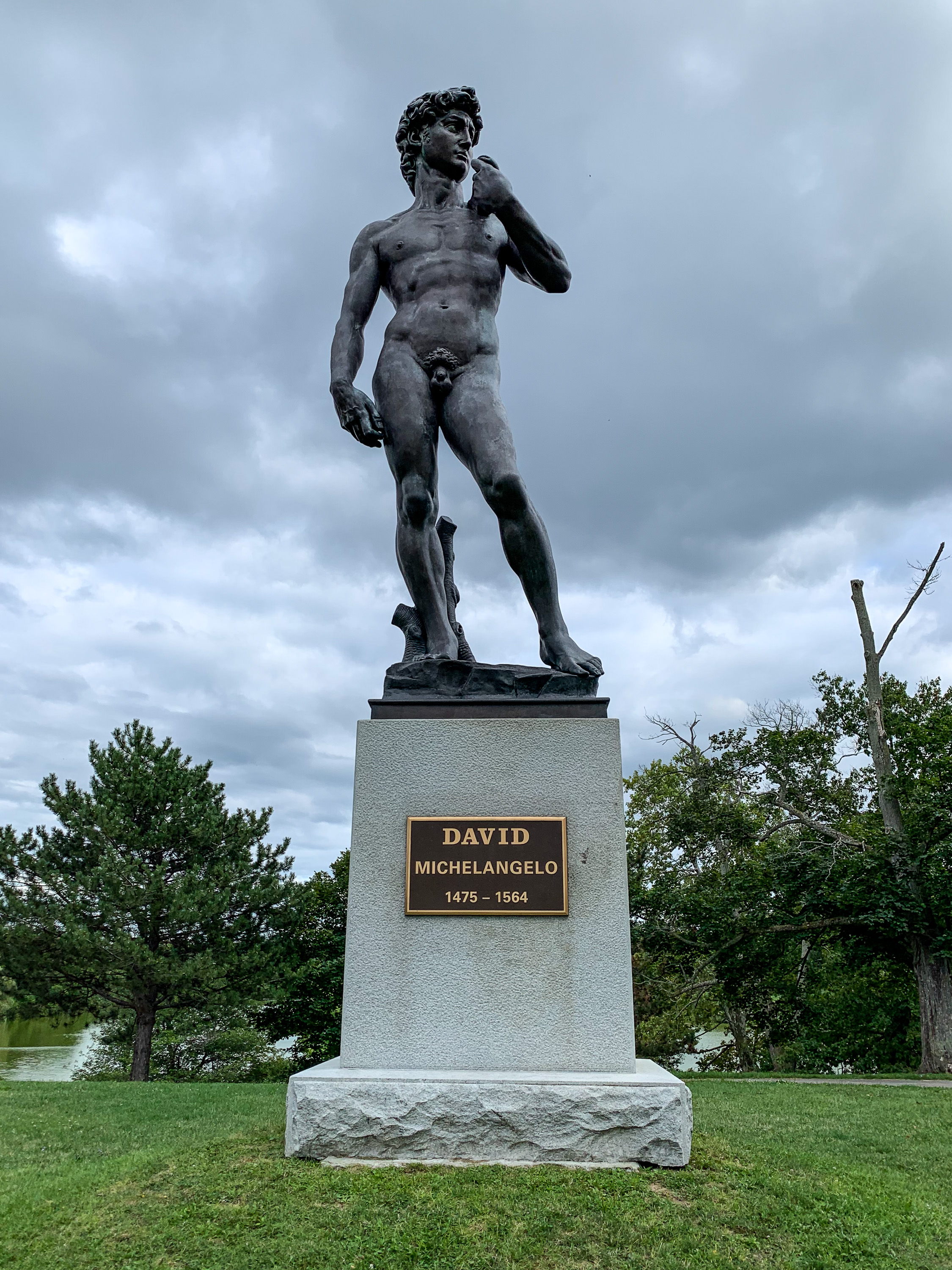
Bronze casting in Buffalo, New York

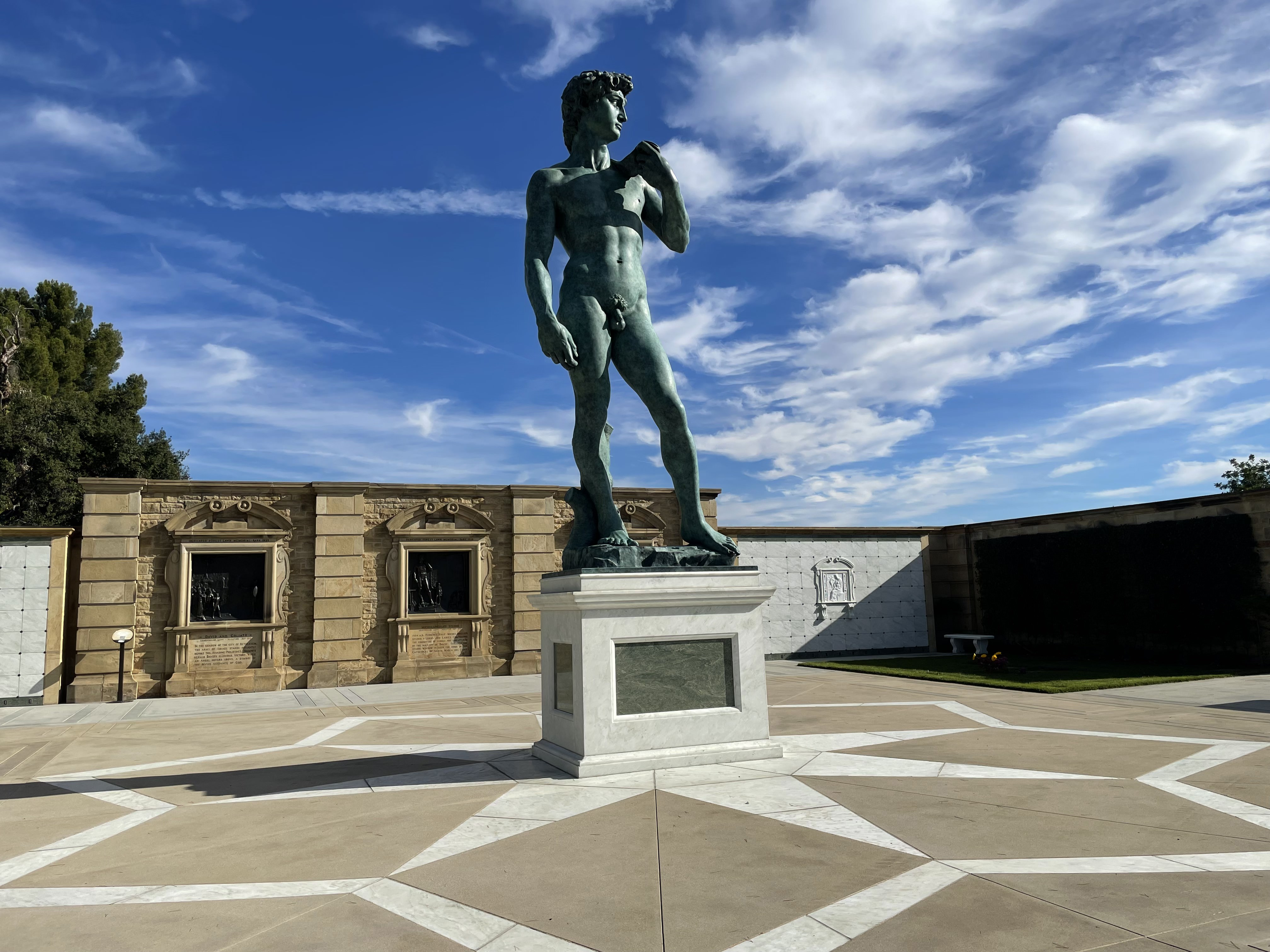
Replica of David at Forest Lawn in Glendale, California

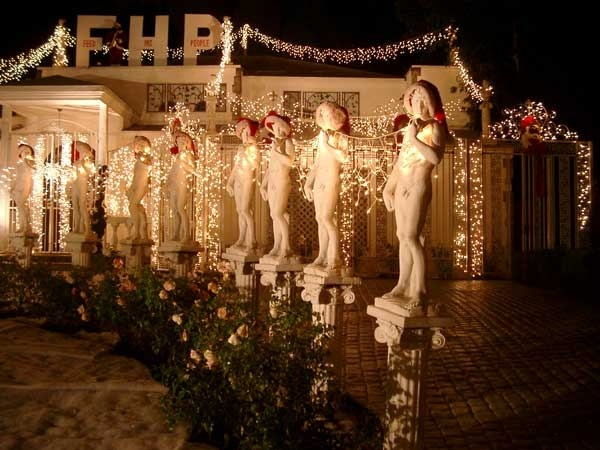
Reduced-scale copies of David in Los Angeles, decorated for Christmas 2005

== South America ==
- A bronze replica stands on the esplanade of Palacio Municipal in Montevideo, Uruguay.
- A marble replica of David is located in the gardens of the Instituto Ricardo Brennand, Recife, Brazil. It was made by Cervietti Franco & Company, again of Pietrasanta.
- A marble replica of David is located in Cerro Otto gallery of art, Bariloche, Rio Negro, Argentina. The gallery also displays replicas of Michelangelo's Moses and Pietà.
- A replica was inaugurated in 2024 in Resistencia, Argentina.
- A replica of David is located in front of the Worker's Recreational Center, a park on the east side of São Paulo, SP, Brazil.
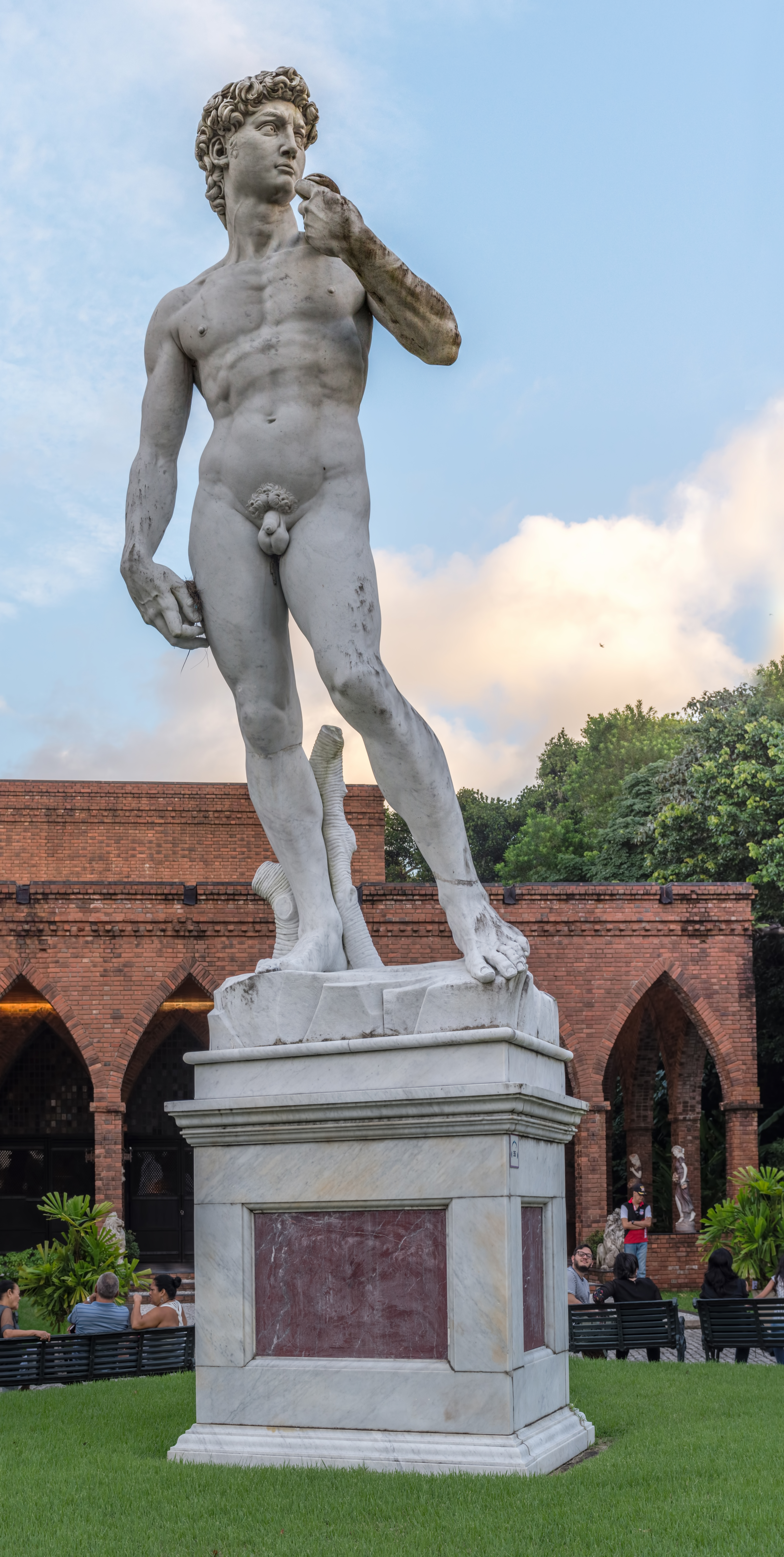
A marble replica at the Instituto Ricardo Brennand in Recife, Brazil.

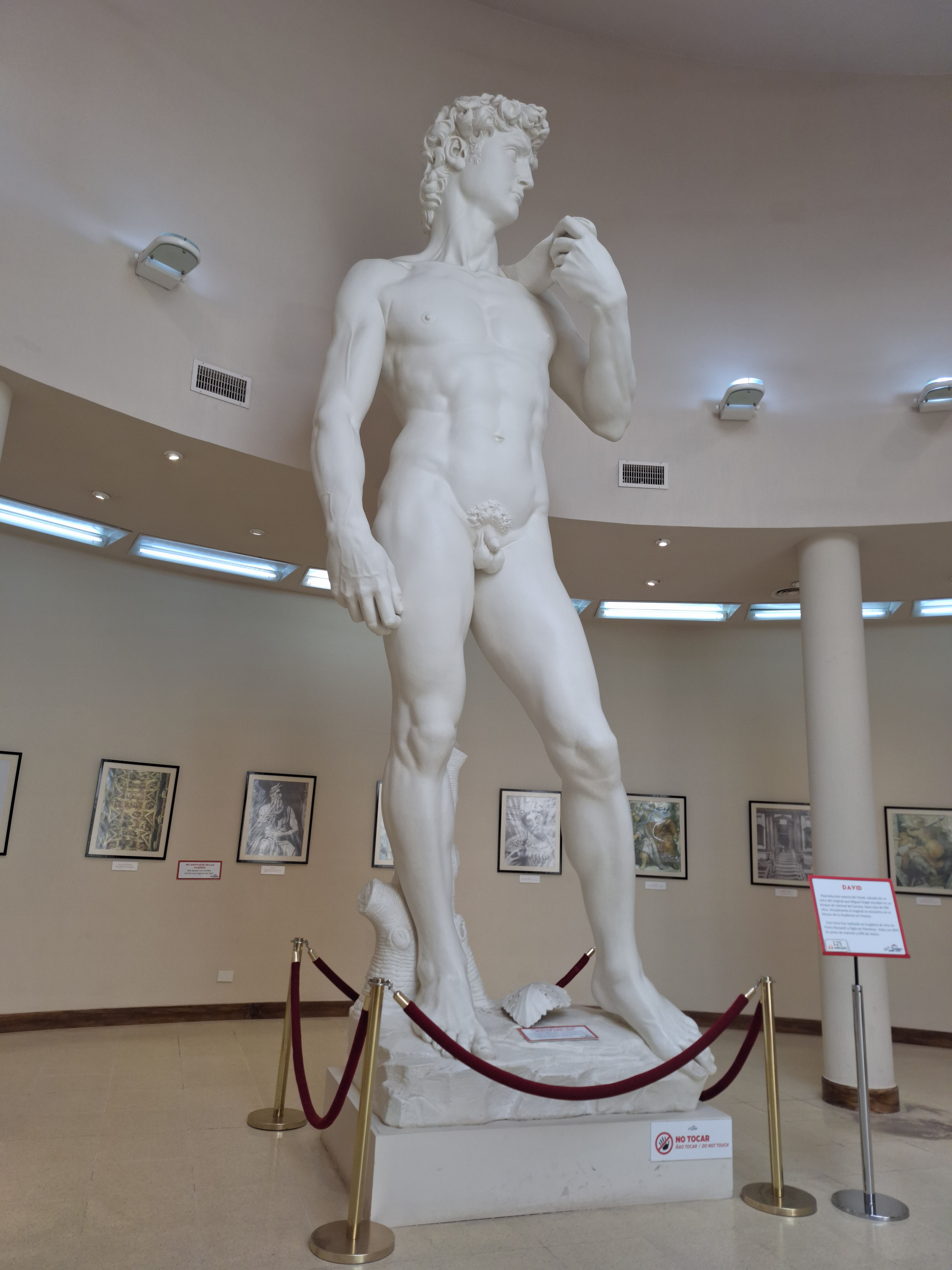
A marble replica at the Cerro Otto gallery of art, Bariloche, Rio Negro, Argentina.

== See also ==
- Replicas of Michelangelo's Pietà
