= Digital Michelangelo Project =

The Digital Michelangelo Project was a pioneering initiative undertaken during the 1998–1999 academic year to digitize the sculptures and architecture of Michelangelo using advanced laser scanning technology. The project was led by a team of 30 faculty, staff, and students from Stanford University and the University of Washington, with the aim of creating high-resolution 3D models of Michelangelo's works for scholarly, educational, and preservation purposes.

== Objectives ==
The primary goals of the Digital Michelangelo Project were:

- To apply recent advancements in laser rangefinder technology for digitizing large cultural artifacts.
- To create detailed digital archives of Michelangelo's sculptures and architectural spaces for future study and analysis.
- To explore potential educational and curatorial applications for 3D scanned data.

=== Artworks digitized ===
The project involved scanning several iconic works by Michelangelo, including:

- David
- The Unfinished Slaves (Atlas, Awakening, Bearded, and Youthful)
- St. Matthew
- The allegorical statues from the Medici tombs (Night, Day, Dawn, and Dusk)
- The architectural interiors of the Tribuna del David at the Galleria dell'Accademia and the New Sacristy in the Medici Chapels.

== Technology and methodology ==
=== 3D scanning ===
The project's primary scanner was laser triangulation rangefinder mounted on a motorized gantry, custom-built by Cyberware Inc. The scanner used a laser sheet to project onto an object, capturing its shape through triangulation. Multiple scans were taken from various angles and combined into a single, detailed 3D mesh. The resolution achieved was fine enough to capture even Michelangelo's chisel marks, with triangles approximately 0.25 mm on each side.

In addition to shape data, color data was captured using a spotlight and a secondary camera, enabling the creation of textured 3D models.

=== Data processing ===
The project developed a software suite for processing the scanned data.

This included:

- Aligning and merging multiple scans into a seamless 3D model.
- Filling holes in the geometry caused by inaccessible areas.
- Correcting color data for lighting inconsistencies and shadowing.

Non-photorealistic rendering techniques were also applied, highlighting surface features such as Michelangelo’s chisel marks for enhanced visualization.

== Logistical challenges ==
The scale and complexity of the project presented several challenges:

- Data size: The dataset for David alone comprised 2 billion polygons and 7,000 color images, occupying 60 GB of storage.
- Artifact safety: Ensuring the safety of the statues during scanning required extensive crew training, foam-encased equipment, and collision-prevention mechanisms.

== Applications and impact ==
The digitized models have numerous potential applications:

- Art history: Allowing precise measurements and geometric analysis, such as determining chisel types or evaluating structural balance.
- Education: Providing new ways to study art, including interactive viewing from unconventional angles and with custom lighting.
- Museum curation: Enhancing visitor experiences through interactive kiosks and virtual models.

The project demonstrated the potential for 3D technology to preserve and disseminate cultural heritage.

== Data distribution ==
The project's models are available through Stanford University for scholarly purposes, under strict licensing due to Italian intellectual property laws.

=== ScanView ===
To provide public access to the 3D models while respecting usage restrictions, the project developed ScanView, a client/server rendering system. ScanView allows users to view and interact with high-resolution 3D models without downloading the data.

The client component consists of a freely available viewer program and simplified 3D models. Users can navigate these models locally, adjusting position, orientation, lighting, and surface appearance. When a user finalizes a view, the client queries a remote server for a high-resolution rendering of the model, which is sent back to overwrite the simplified version on the user’s screen. A typical query-response cycle takes 1–2 seconds, depending on network conditions.

To protect the models from unauthorized reconstruction, the system employs several security measures, including:

- Encrypting queries
- Perturbing viewpoint and lighting parameters
- Adding noise and warping rendered images
- Compressing images before transmission

ScanView operates on Windows-based PCs and provides access to selected models, including David and St. Matthew, as well as other artifacts such as fragments of the Forma Urbis Romae and items from the Stanford 3D Scanning Repository.

== Sponsors ==
The Digital Michelangelo Project was supported by Stanford University, Interval Research Corporation, and the Paul G. Allen Foundation for the Arts.
