= David (Michelangelo) =

Renaissance statue in Florence, Italy

Coordinates: 43°46′36.13″N 11°15′34.02″E

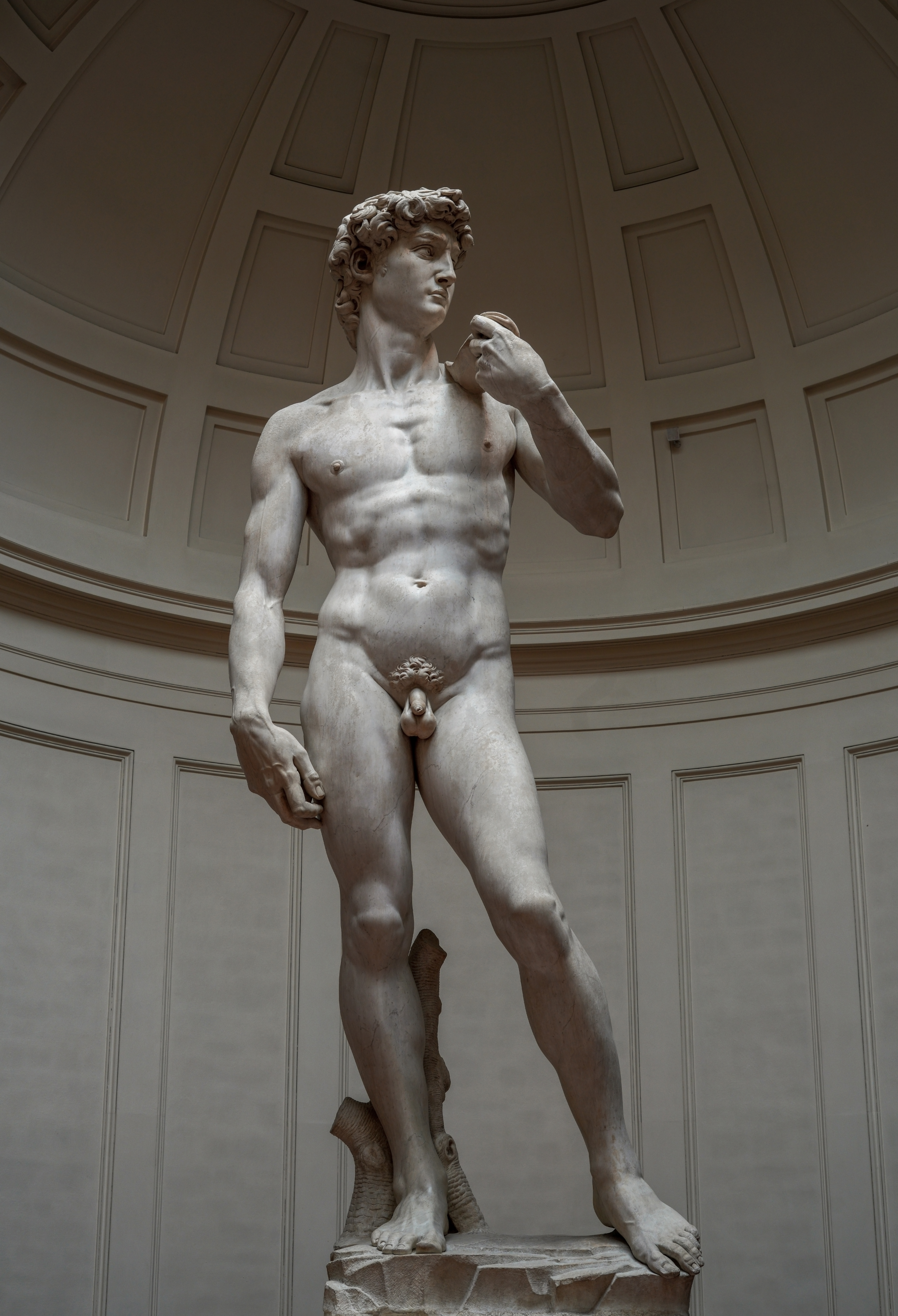
- Artist: Michelangelo
- Year: c. 1501 – June 8, 1504
- Medium: Carrara marble
- Subject: Biblical David
- Dimensions: 517 cm × 199 cm (17 ft × 6.5 ft)
- Location: Galleria dell'Accademia, Florence, Italy
- Preceded by: Pietà
- Followed by: Madonna of Bruges

David is a masterpiece of Italian Renaissance sculpture in marble created from 1501 to 1504 by Michelangelo. With a height of 5.17 metres (17 ft 0 in), the David was not only the first colossal marble statue made in the High Renaissance, but also the first since classical antiquity, setting a precedent for the 16th century and beyond. David was originally commissioned as one of a series of statues of twelve prophets to be positioned along the roofline of the east end of Florence Cathedral, but was instead placed in the public square in front of the Piazza della Signoria, the seat of civic government in Florence, where it was unveiled on 8 September 1504. In 1873, the statue was moved to the Galleria dell'Accademia, Florence. In 1910 a replica was installed at the original site on the public square.

The biblical figure David was a favoured subject in the art of Florence. Because of the nature of the figure it represented, the statue soon came to symbolize the defence of civil liberties embodied in the 1494 constitution of the Republic of Florence, an independent city-state threatened on all sides by more powerful rival states and by the political aspirations of the Medici family.

== History ==
=== Commission ===
Plans were being made by the Operai del Duomo for a statue of David long before Michelangelo's began his work on it, which lasted from 1501 to 1504. The statue's commission was made during a decisive period in the history of the Florentine republic established before the expulsion of the Medici. The advantages of democratic government never materialized, and internal circumstances grew worse as dangers from without increased. Lorenzo de' Medici's successors and their supporters were a constant threat to the republic, and it was in defiance of the menace they represented that the project of a marble David was renewed.

The Overseers of the Office of Works, known as the Operai del Duomo, were officers of the Opera di Santa Maria del Fiore, the organization charged with the construction and maintenance of the new Cathedral of Florence. The Operai consisted of a 12-member committee that organized competitions, chose the best entries, commissioned the prevailing artists, and paid for the finished work. Most of them were members of the influential woolen cloth guild, the Arte della Lana. They had plans long before Michelangelo's involvement to commission a series of twelve large sculptures of Old Testament prophets for the twelve spurs, or protrusions, generated by the four diagonal buttresses that helped support the enormous weight of the cathedral dome.

In 1410, Donatello had made the first of the series of statues, a colossal figure of Joshua in terracotta, gessoed and painted white to give it the appearance of marble at a distance. Although Charles Seymour Jr says Donatello's protégé Agostino di Duccio was commissioned in 1463 to create a terracotta figure of Hercules for the series, almost certainly under the supervision of Donatello, Paoletti writes that "The term 'hercules' may not be a specific indication of the subject of the figure but simply a synonym... used at the time for a 'giant' or very large figure."

Ready to continue their project, in 1464 the Operai contracted Agostino to create a marble sculpture of the young David, a symbol of Florence, to be mounted high on the eastern end of the Duomo. This was to be formed in the Roman manner from several blocks of marble, but in 1465 Agostino himself went to Carrara, a town in the Apuan Alps, and acquired a very large block of bianco ordinario from the Fantiscritti quarry. He began work on the statue but got only as far as beginning to shape the torso, legs, and feet, roughing out drapery, and possibly hollowing a hole between the legs. For unknown reasons his work on the block of marble halted with the death of his master Donatello in 1466. Antonio Rossellino, also a Florentine, was commissioned in 1476 to resume the work, but the contract was apparently rescinded, and the block lay neglected and exposed to the weather in the yard of the cathedral workshop for another twenty-five years. This was of great concern to the Operai authorities, as such a large piece of marble was not only costly, but represented considerable labour and difficulty in its transportation to Florence.

In 1500, an inventory of the cathedral workshops described the piece as "a certain figure of marble called David, badly blocked out and supine." A year later, documents showed that the Operai were determined to find an artist who could take this large piece of marble and turn it into a finished work of art. They ordered that the block of stone, which they called il gigante (the giant), be "raised on its feet" so that a master experienced in this kind of work might examine it and express an opinion. Though Leonardo da Vinci among others was consulted, and Andrea Sansovino was also keen to get the commission, it was Michelangelo, at 26 years of age, who convinced the Operai that he deserved the commission. On 16 August 1501, Michelangelo was given the official contract to undertake this task. It said (English translation of the Latin text):

... the Consuls of the Arte della Lana and the Lords Overseers being met, have chosen as sculptor to the said Cathedral the worthy master, Michelangelo, the son of Lodovico Buonarrotti, a citizen of Florence, to the end that he may make, finish and bring to perfection the male figure known as the Giant, nine braccia in height, already blocked out in marble by Maestro Agostino grande, of Florence, and badly blocked; and now stored in the workshops of the Cathedral. The work shall be completed within the period and term of two years next ensuing, beginning from the first day of September ...

He began carving the statue early in the morning on 13 September, a month after he was awarded the contract. The contract provided him a workspace in the Opera di Santa Maria del Fiore behind the Duomo, paid him a salary of six fiorini per month, and allowed him two years to complete the sculpture.

When the finished statue was moved from the Opera del Duomo to the Piazza della Signoria over the course of four days, as reported by two contemporary diarists, Luca Landucci and Pietro di Marco Parenti, a guard was placed to protect it from violence by other artists in Florence who had hoped for the commission. They were hostile to Michelangelo because of his bold request to the wardens of the Cathedral and the governor of the city, Piero Soderini. Despite the precaution, the sculpture was damaged by stones, leaving still visible marks on the upper part of its back. Four youths from prominent Florentine families were subsequently arrested by the Otto di Guardia and three were imprisoned for what may have been simple vandalism without a political motive.

=== Process ===
Michelangelo regarded a single block of stone as containing all the possible conceptions for a work of art, and believed that the artist's task is sculpting the marble block to reveal the ideal form within, an expression of his Neo-Platonic belief that body and mind are separate, and must work in concert and strive to attain union with one another and with the divine. In later years, speaking of his early commissions sculpting marble, he contended that he was merely liberating figures that were already existent in the stone, and that he could see them in his mind's eye.

Giorgio Vasari wrote of Michelangelo sculpting the Prisoners that his method was to chisel the parts in highest relief first, then gradually revealing the lower parts. According to Franca Falletti, the passage describes Michelangelo's process of working marble in general. Lengthy preparatory work was done before the actual sculpting began – this included sketches, drawings and the making of small-scale terracotta or wax models. After these preliminary studies he went directly to sculpting the marble, using the method described by Vasari. He chiseled layer after layer from the main face of the stone, and then gradually more and more of the other sides. The unfinished state of the Prisoners demonstrates this process, and David must have been sculpted in the same manner.

The massive block of white marble that was to become the David, measuring nine braccia in length, was of bianco ordinario grade stone, rather than the superior statuario. It came from the old Roman Fantiscritti quarry at the centre of the Carrara marble basins, and had been transported by oxen-pulled carts to the sea, whence it was carried on barges dragged by oxen up the river Arno to Florence.

The Operai del Duomo had raised the block to an upright position prior to the first inspection of their purchase, but a scaffolding had to be built so that Michelangelo could reach every part. The artist, who made his steel chisels himself, began cutting the stone with the subbia, a heavy, pointed iron tool used to rough out the main mass, before he employed the two-toothed shorter blade called the calcagnuolo. By the time he began to use the three-toothed gradina, a serrated claw chisel whose marks are seen in his unfinished sculptures, the basic form of the statue was emerging from the matrix. When he sculpted David's hair and the pupils of his eyes, he used the trapano, a drill worked with a bow, like the ancient sculptors.

Michelangelo did without flat chisels in his sculpturing, and brought his pieces to the state of non finito almost entirely with toothed chisels. During the 2003 restoration of David, Italian researchers observed marks of the subbia, the sharpened subbia da taglio, the slightly flattened unghietto (fingernail), and the gradina, as well as marks from a smaller-toothed chisel, the dente di cane (dog's tooth). They found no evidence of Michelangelo using flat chisels in the work.

A node of marble on the gigante that Michelangelo chiseled away before he began work on David in earnest has been interpreted by historians as a knot of drapery, based on the surmise that Agostino di Duccio's figure was intended to be clothed. Irving Lavin proposes that the node may have been a point, that is, a knob of marble left purposely by Agostino as a fixed reference for a mechanical transfer measuring off his statue from the model. Lavin suggests that Agostino's aborted attempt was the result of an error in his pointing system, and that if this conjecture is correct, it may illuminate a note added in the margin next to the passage in the commission giving il gigante to Michelangelo:

The said Michelangelo began to work on the said giant on the morning of 13 September 1501, although a few days earlier, on 9 September, he had with one or two blows of the chisel (uno vel duo ictibus) removed a certain nodus (quoddam nodum) that it had on its chest.

=== Placement ===
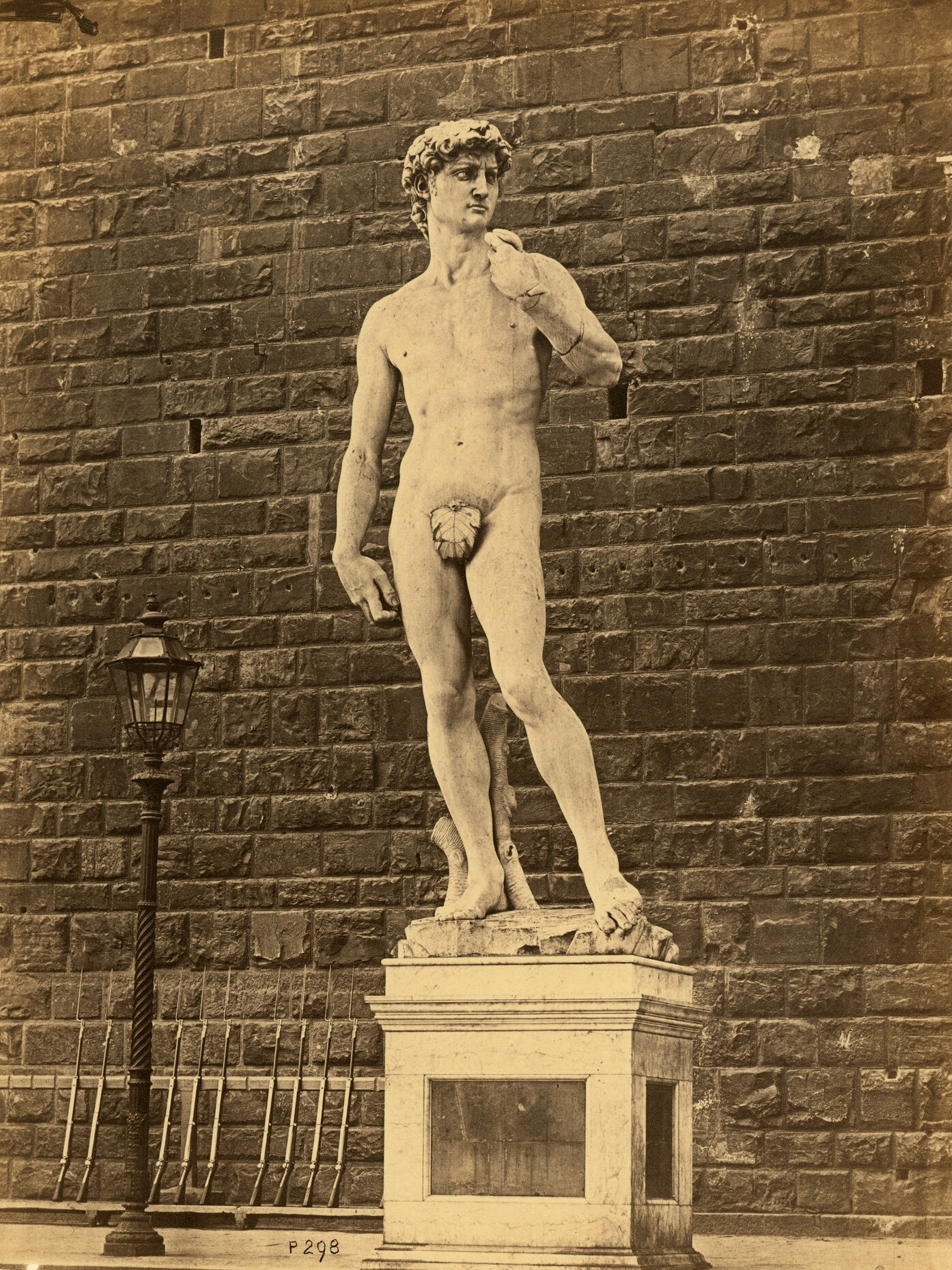
The David in front of the Palazzo Vecchio before 1873, with a leaf covering his genitals

On 25 January 1504, when the sculpture was nearing completion, Florentine authorities had to acknowledge there would be little possibility of raising the 5.17 metre high statue weighing approximately 8.5 tons to the roof of the cathedral. They convened a committee of 30 Florentine citizens that included many artists, including Leonardo da Vinci and Sandro Botticelli, to decide on an appropriate site for David. While nine different locations for the statue were discussed, the majority of members seem to have been closely split between two sites.

One group, led by Giuliano da Sangallo and supported by Leonardo and Piero di Cosimo, among others, believed that, due to the imperfections in the marble, the sculpture should be placed under the roof of the Loggia dei Lanzi on Piazza della Signoria; the other group thought it should stand at the entrance to the Palazzo della Signoria, the city's town hall (now known as Palazzo Vecchio). Another opinion, shared by Botticelli and Cosimo Rosselli, was that the sculpture should be situated in front of the cathedral.

In June 1504, David was installed next to the entrance to the Palazzo della Signoria, replacing Donatello's bronze sculpture of Judith and Holofernes, which also embodied a theme of heroic resistance. It took four days to move it the half mile from the cathedral's workshop into the Piazza della Signoria. The statue was suspended in a wooden frame and rolled on fourteen greased logs by more than 40 men. Later that summer, the sling and tree-stump support were gilded, and the figure was given a gilt loin-garland and victory wreath for its head.

=== Later history ===
Interactive 3D model of the statue

In 1525 the block of marble intended to be the pendant for the David fell off a barge into the river Arno as it was being transported to Florence. Vasari wrote that it had jumped into the river in despair when it heard that Baccio Bandinelli would be carving it rather than Michelangelo, to whom the commission for a colossal statue of Hercules and Cacus at the entrance to the Palazzo della Signoria had originally been given.

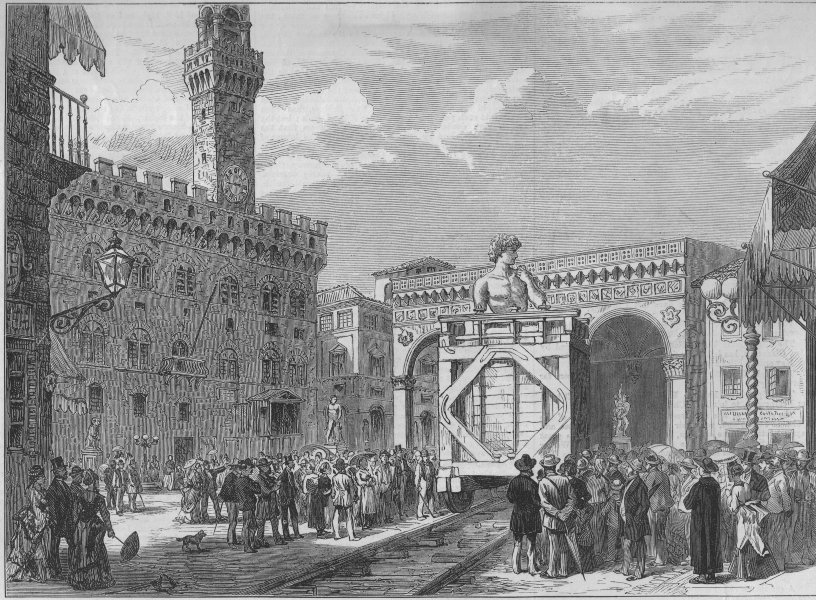
Moving the David from Piazza della Signoria to the Galleria dell'Accademia

In the mid-1800s, small cracks were noticed on the left leg on the David, which can possibly be attributed to an uneven sinking of the ground under the massive statue. In 1873, it was removed from the piazza to protect it from damage, and was moved to the Accademia Gallery where it would attract many visitors. The sculpture was secured in a wheeled wooden crate, and moved slowly across the city from 30 July to 10 August that year. Its 16th-century base, said to be decrepit in contemporary reports, was lost when the crate was disassembled. A model of the crate is in the Museo di Casa Buonarroti, the house-museum in Florence's Via Ghibellina where Michelangelo lived. The statue was not placed in its permanent setting in the Accademia until 1882. The architect Emilio De Fabris, professor at the Accademia, designed a tribune to house the David in a vaulted interior exedra, towards the apse, where it was bathed in light that streamed in through windows in the dome above. A replica was placed in the Piazza della Signoria in 1910.

In 1991, Piero Cannata, an artist whom the police described as deranged, attacked the statue with a hammer he had concealed beneath his jacket and damaged the second toe of the left foot. He later said that a 16th-century Venetian painter's model ordered him to do so. Cannata was restrained by museum patrons until the police arrived. Fragments fell to the floor, and three tourists were caught by guards as they were trying to leave the gallery with pieces in their pockets.

The state of preservation of the David has been monitored and evaluated since 2000 using high-resolution 3D scanning, photogrammetry, finite element method (FEM) analyses, and in situ fracture monitoring through fibre optic Bragg gratings. These observations have shown that in its present vertical orientation, with the basal plinth horizontal, the centre of gravity of the base does not align with the David's centre of gravity. Nevertheless, FEM analysis suggests that the statue is stable in its current position and indicates that its forward inclination of 1 degree to 3 degrees has played a major part in the development of cracks in the ankles.

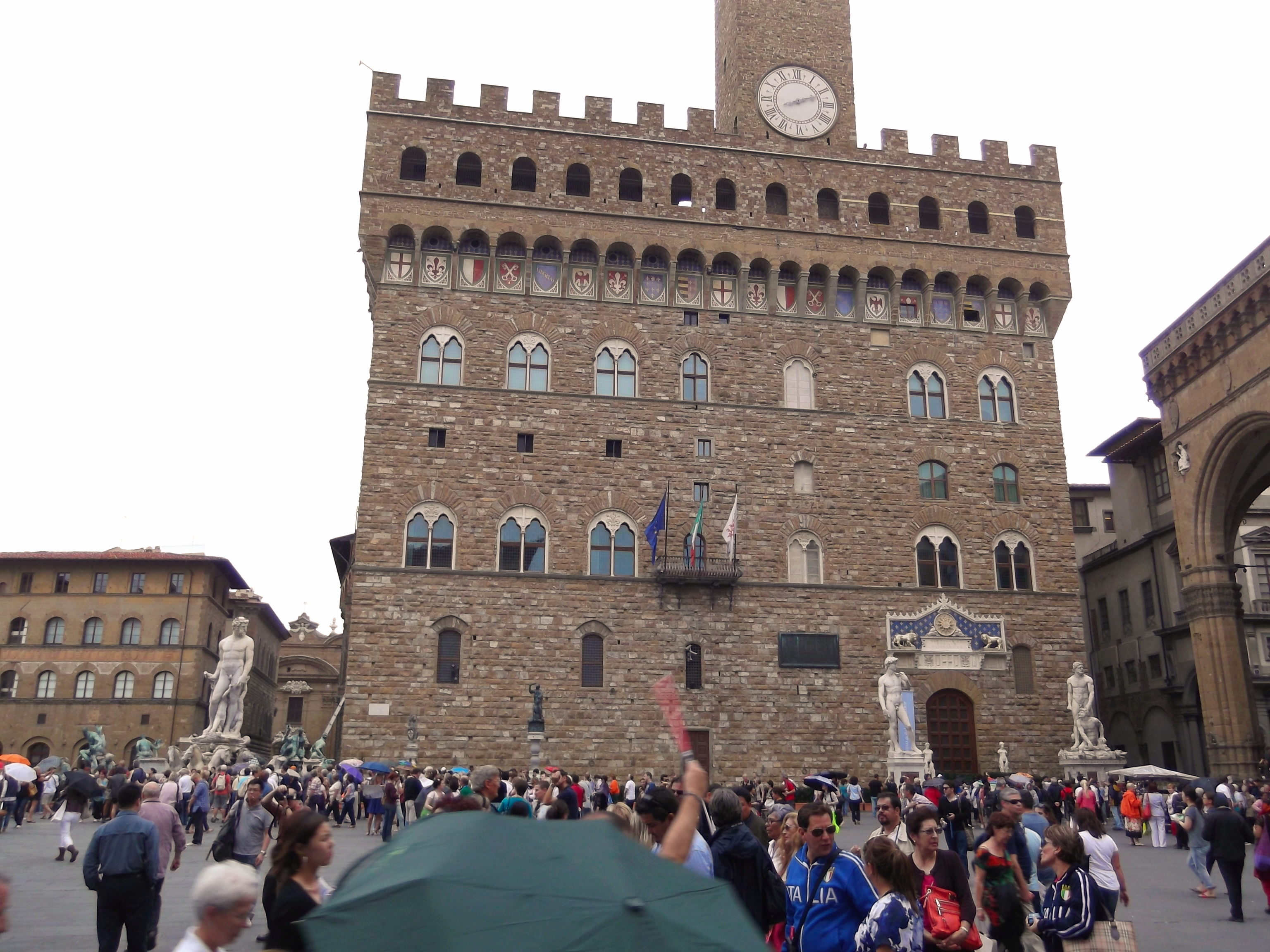
The Pallazzo Vecchio today, with the Fountain of Neptune (1560 and 1574) and other sculptural works

In 2006, Borri and Grazini, using historical analysis and a finite element model of the David, identified the probable cause of the cracks in its legs as a slight forward inclination of the statue that developed after the flood of 1844 in Florence. The statue being located outdoors in front of the Palazzo della Signoria (Palazzo Vecchio) from 1504 to 1873, this inclination likely occurred because of the "uneven subsidence and rotation of the statue's foundations". Further damage occurred with the additional weight placed on the statue when, in 1847, Clemente Papi made a plaster mould composed of more than 1,500 separate segments, some weighing as much as 680 kg. The sculpture was also inclined on other occasions, such as when it was moved in 1873 to its placement in the Galleria dell'Accademia, after which the tilt was corrected. Ultrasonic crack assessment tests carried out by Pascale and Lolli in 2014 determined that cracks in the broncone, the tree trunk against which the David's right leg rests, are the most worrisome of those in the statue. The left ankle and the area where the left heel and the base are attached also show cracks of critical concern.

Some scholars have suggested that the relative weakness caused by the cracks in its legs could make the statue vulnerable to the vibrations of foot traffic from visitors to the gallery. Nearly a million and a half tourists (about four thousand people each day it is open) visit the Accademia Gallery annually to see the David. In 2015, Pieraccini et al. measured its dynamic movements with interferometric radar. Measurements were made of such displacements on two days: Monday, 27 July and Tuesday, 28 July 2015; on Monday the Accademia is closed, while Tuesday is statistically the peak attendance day. Their results did not show a significant increase in the vibration amplitude on days the Accademia was open, compared to days it was closed.

In 2010, a dispute over the ownership of David arose when, based on a legal review of historical documents, the municipality of Florence claimed ownership of the statue in opposition to the Italian Culture Ministry, which disputes the municipal claim.

== Interpretation ==
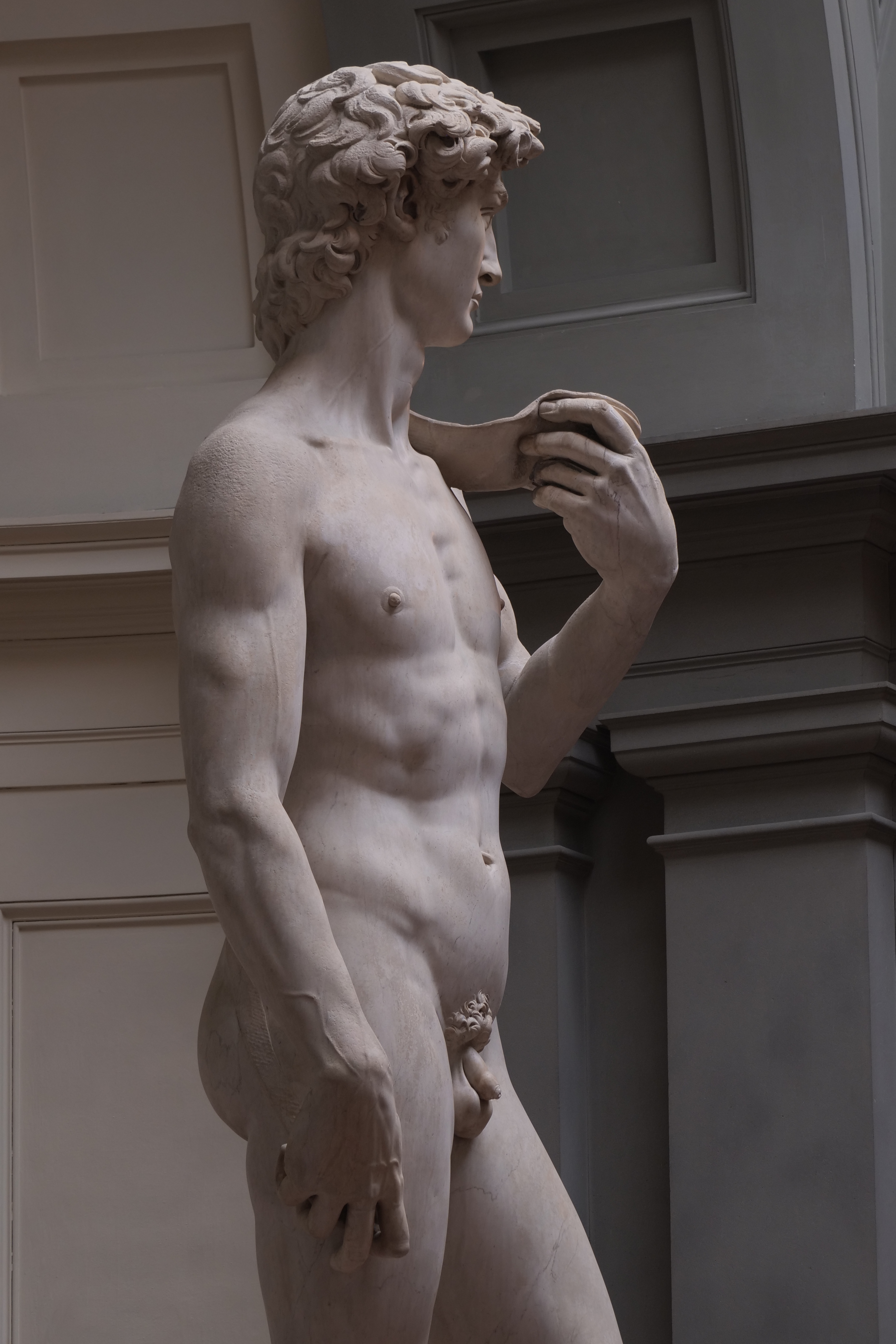
His slender profile and elegant lines of the arms from the left

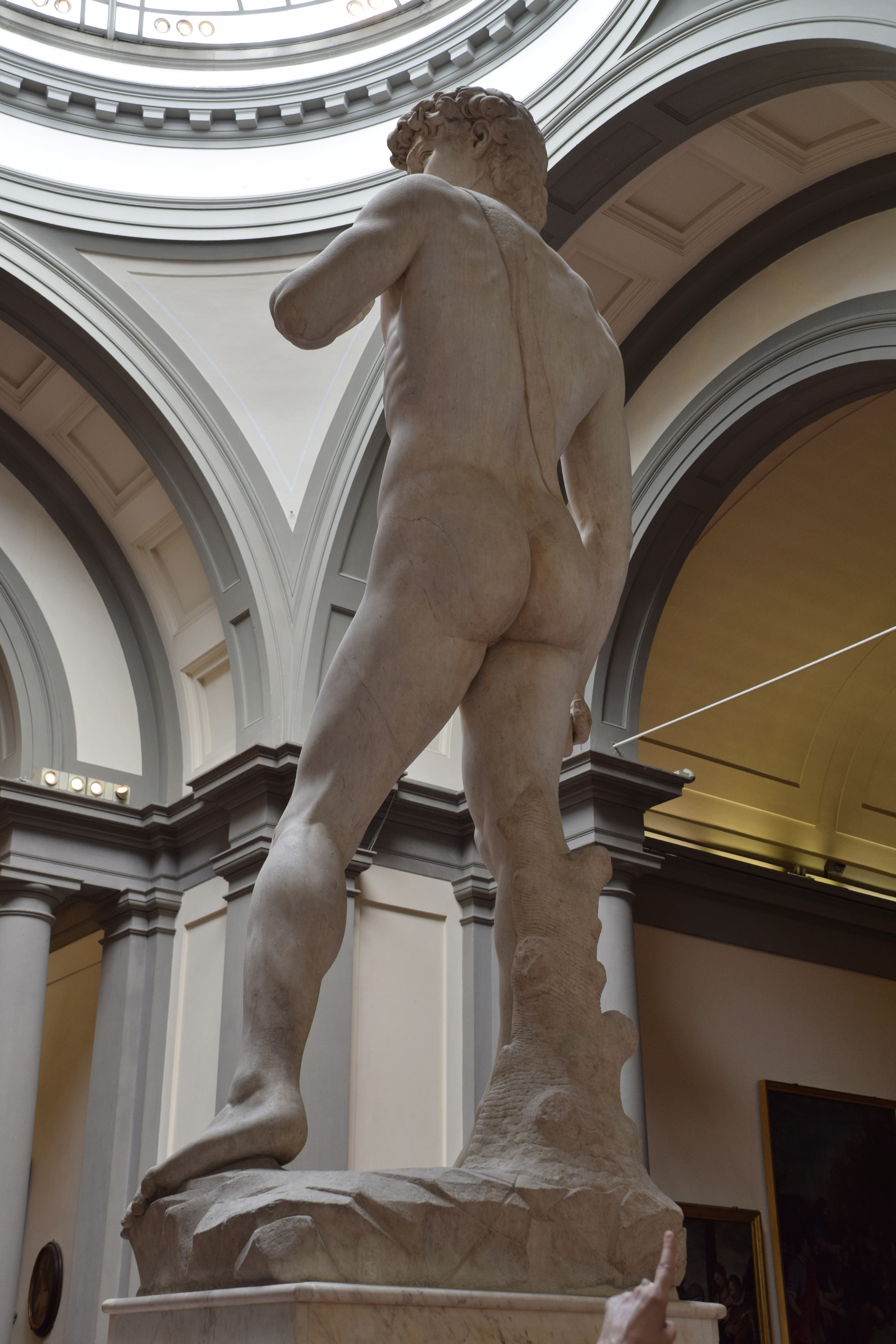
The free leg of the contrapposto in back view

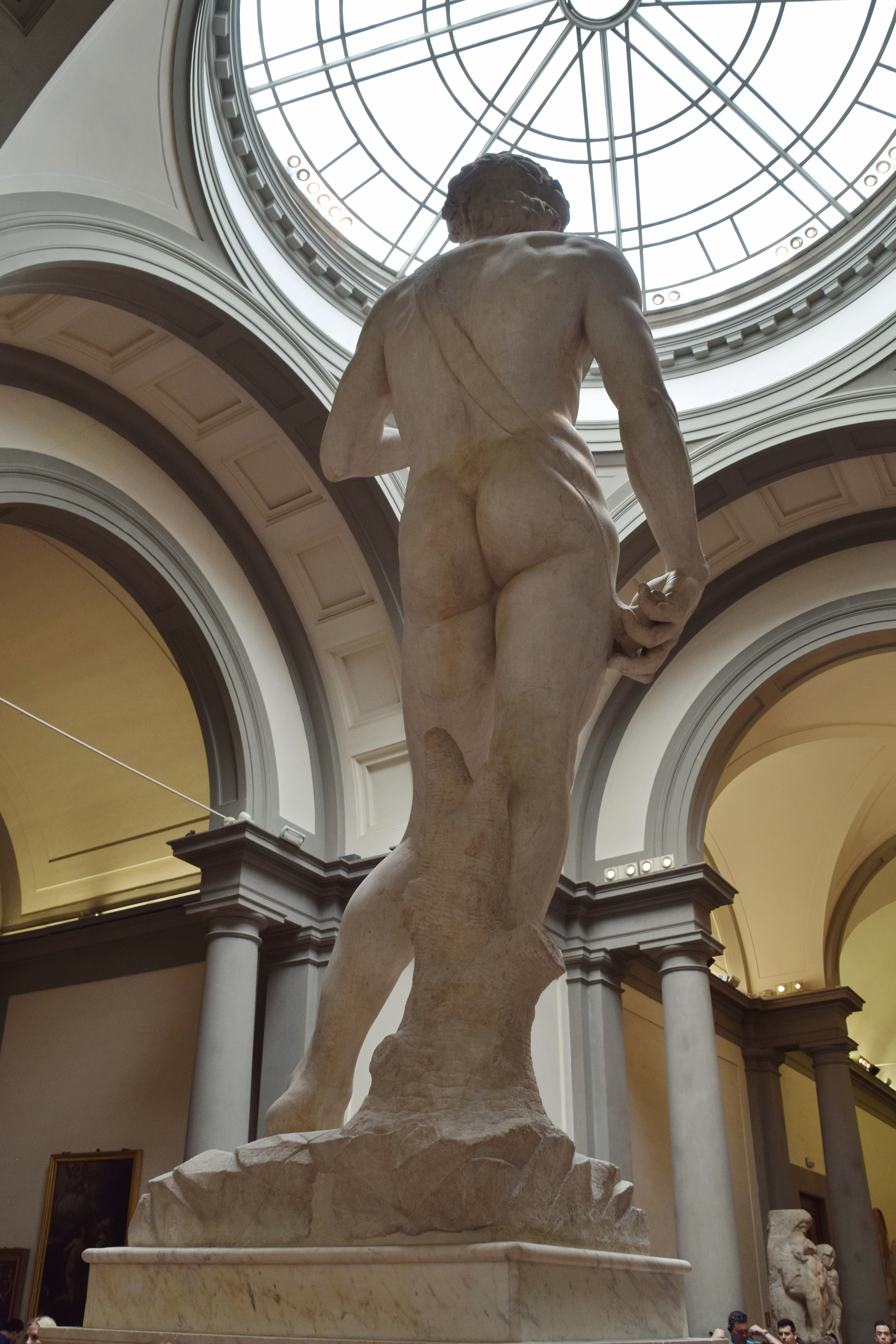
Back view with the sling running down his spine into his left hand

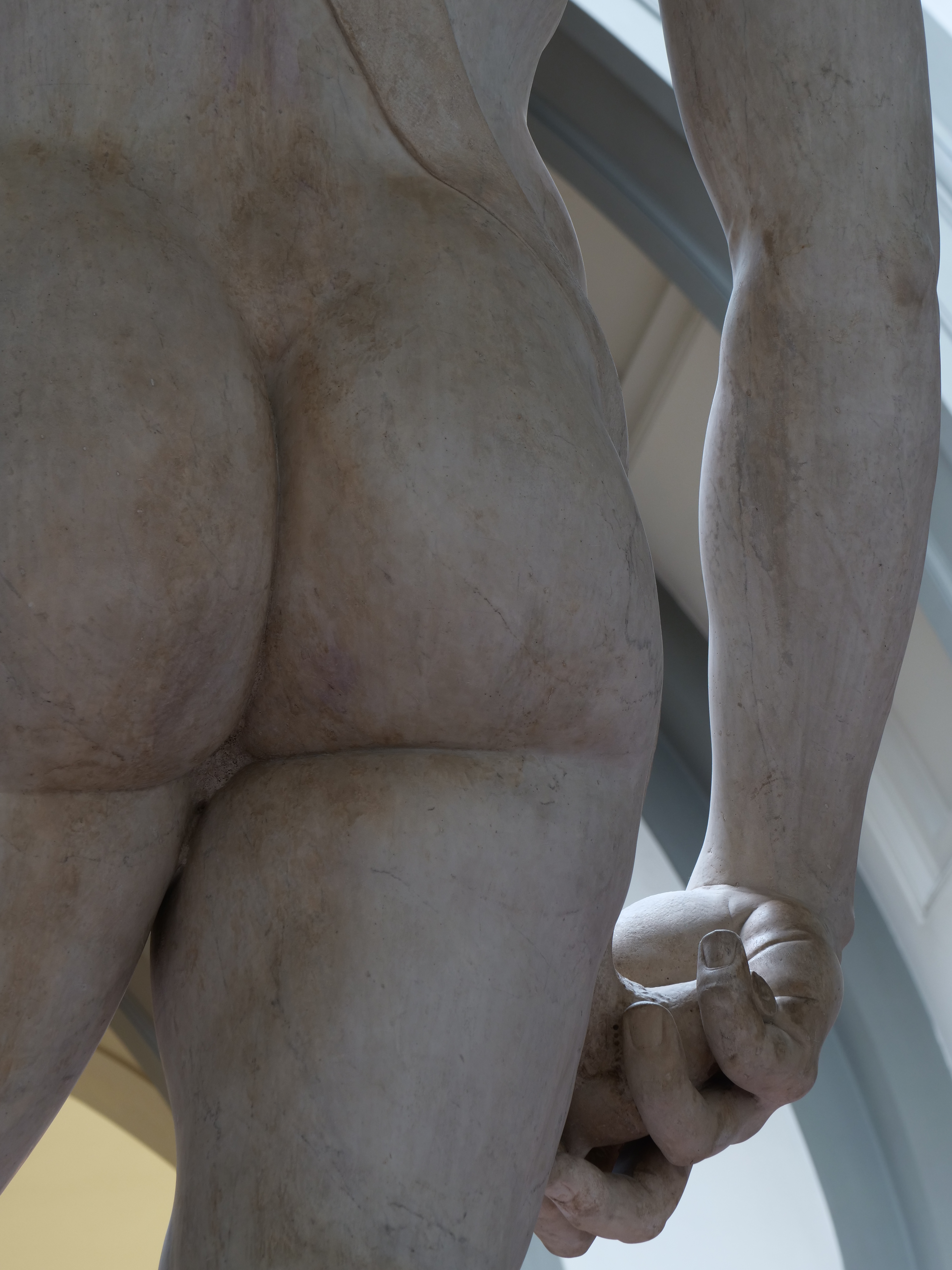
A sling handle in his left hand, a rock in his right hand.

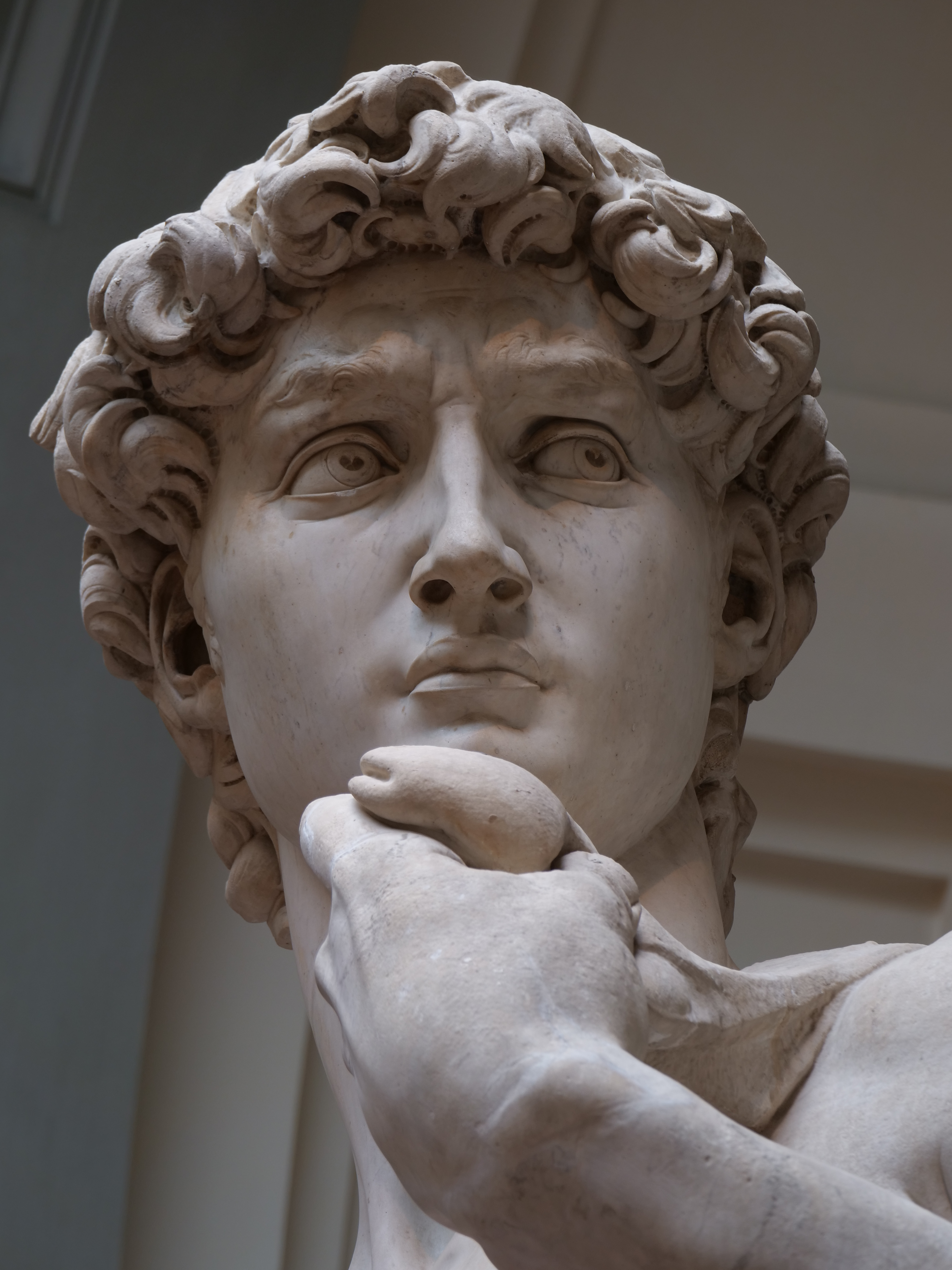
David's gaze

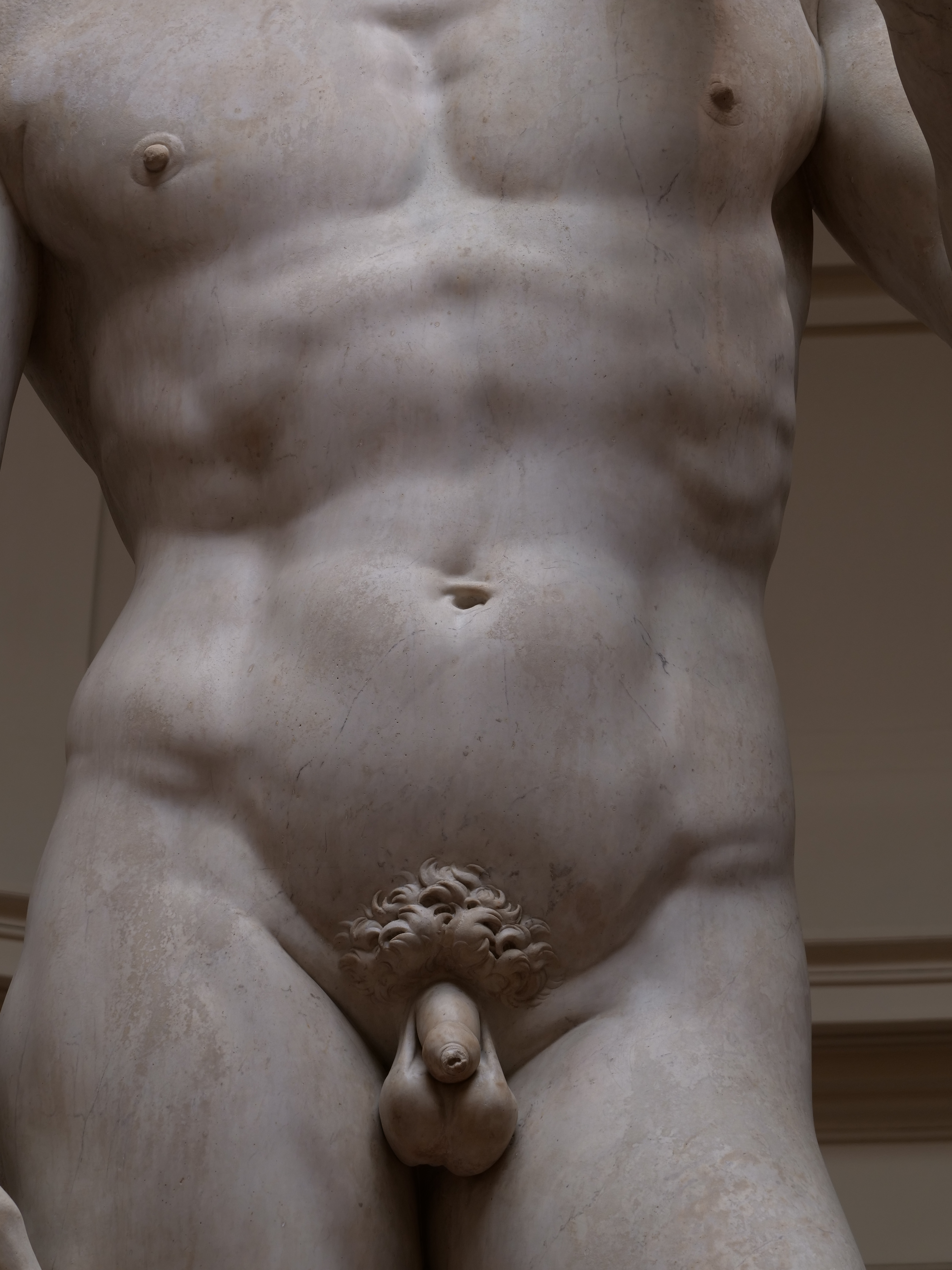
Modelling of his chest and belly

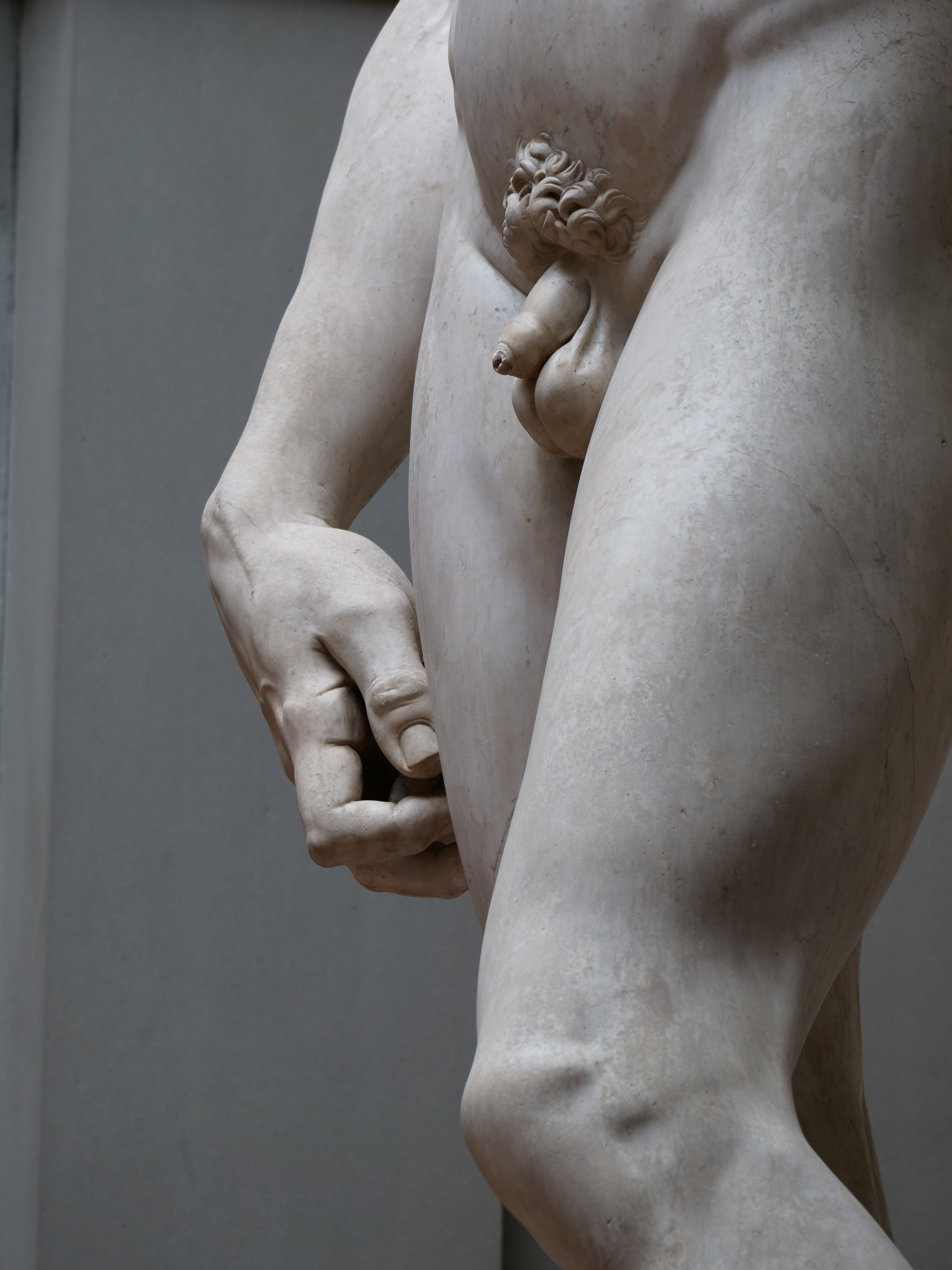
Composition of parallel lines

The pose of Michelangelo's David is unlike that of earlier Renaissance depictions of David. The bronze statues by Donatello and Verrocchio represented the hero standing victorious over the head of Goliath, and the painter Andrea del Castagno had shown the boy in mid-swing, even as Goliath's head rested between his legs, but no earlier Florentine artist had omitted the giant altogether. According to such scholars as Howard Hibbard, David is depicted before his battle with Goliath. Rather than being shown victorious over a foe much larger than he, David looks wary as he sizes up the giant Goliath before the battle has actually taken place. His brow is drawn, his neck tense, and the veins bulge out of his lowered right hand. His left hand holds a sling that is draped over his shoulder and down to his right hand, which holds the handle of the sling.

The twist of his body in contrapposto, standing with most of its weight on his right foot and the other leg forward, effectively conveys to the viewer a sense of potential energy, the feeling that he is about to move. The statue is a Renaissance interpretation of a common ancient Greek theme of the standing heroic male nude. In the Renaissance, contrapposto poses were thought of as a distinctive feature of antique sculpture, initially manifested in the Doryphoros of Polykleitos (c. 440 BC). This is typified in David; this classic pose causes both hips and shoulders to rest at opposing angles, giving a slight s-curve to the entire torso. The contrapposto stance is emphasized by the left leg stepping forward, and by the contrasting positions of the arms: the left arm raised with its hand to the shoulder and the other hand touching the thigh.

Michelangelo's David has become one of the most recognized works of Renaissance sculpture; a symbol of strength and youthful beauty. The colossal size of the statue alone impressed Michelangelo's contemporaries. Vasari described it as "certainly a miracle that Michelangelo was able to raise up one who had died", and then listed all of the largest and most grand of the ancient statues that he had ever seen, concluding that Michelangelo's work surpassed "all ancient and modern statues, whether Greek or Latin, that have ever existed."

The proportions of the David are atypical of Michelangelo's work as well as of antique models; the figure has an unusually large head and hands (particularly apparent in the right hand). These enlargements may be due to the fact that the statue was originally intended to be placed on the cathedral roofline, where the important parts of the sculpture may have been accentuated in order to be visible from below. The small size of the genitals, though, is in line with his other works and with Renaissance conventions in general. The statue is unusually slender (front to back) in comparison to its height, which may be a result of the work done on the block before Michelangelo began carving it.

A naturalistic rendition of the nude human body, if rendered successfully, has an erotic aspect. Vasari alludes to the statue's sexual locus when he acclaims the figure's "very divine flanks". The flanks (fianchi) frame this part of the body, the nexus of its carnality. Antonio Forcellino calls the David's sexual organs "the most disquieting genitals of Renaissance sculpture", referring to the manner in which the small bulge, typical of adolescence, frames a tuft of pubic hair that "supports a penis full of energy and displays the testicles, also full of vigour".

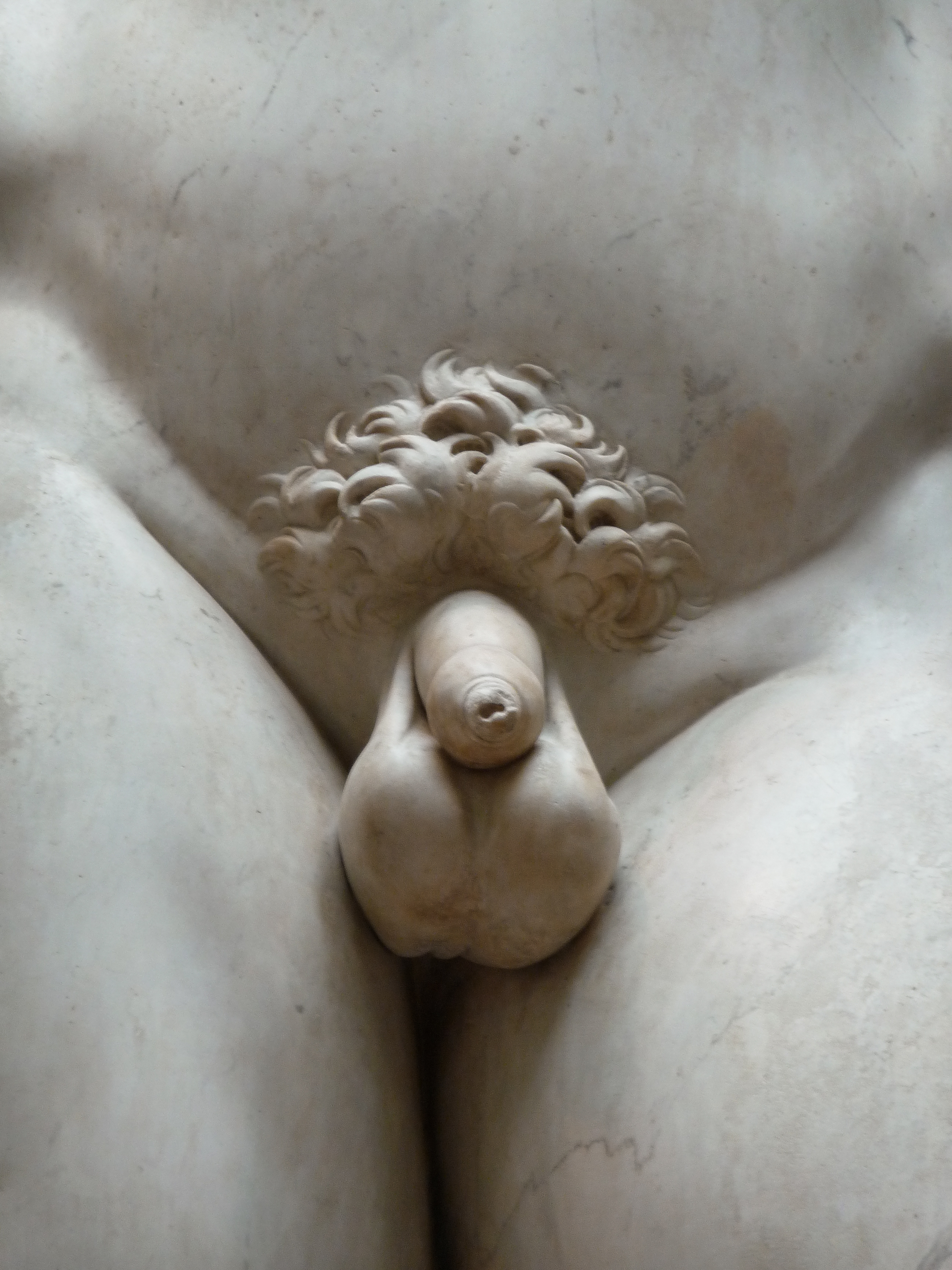
The presence of a foreskin on David's penis, though at odds with the Judaic practice of circumcision, is in keeping with the conventions of Renaissance art.

Commentators have noted the presence of a foreskin on David's penis, which may appear at odds with the Judaic practice of circumcision. An artistic deviation from what very likely would have been accurately portrayed as a circumcised penis, it is in keeping with the conventions of Renaissance art, in which the Christ Child, for example, is represented as being uncircumcised, although clearly older than the eight days compelled by Jewish scripture.

== Political implications ==
David the giant-killer had long been seen as a political symbol in Florence, and images of the biblical hero already carried political implications there. Donatello's bronze David, made for Cosimo de' Medici, perhaps c. 1440, had been appropriated by the Signoria in 1494, when the Medici were exiled from Florence, and the statue was installed in the courtyard of the Palazzo della Signoria, where it symbolized the Republican government of the city. According to Levine, by placing Michelangelo's statue in the same general location, it is likely that the David was conceived as politically controversial before Michelangelo began work on it, as well as an artistic response to that earlier work. While the originally intended location for the David was high up on the cathedral, its location was still in question. The commission, consisting of the most prominent artists of the day, debated in great detail the best placement for the colossal figure to be seen and appreciated, with consideration for its aria, moda, and qualità (its aura, style, and excellence). The political overtones led to the statue being attacked twice in its early days. Protesters pelted it with stones the year it debuted, and, in 1527, an anti-Medici riot resulted in its left arm being broken into three pieces. Giorgio Vasari later claimed that he and his friend Francesco Silviati, although just boys, braved the violence and saved the pieces, storing them in Silviati's father's house.

Machiavelli wrote of the long Florentine tradition that represented David as defender of the patria, a convention most completely developed in the arts – especially in the series of statues, from Donatello's to Michelangelo's, depicting him as the protector of his people. Having returned the armour given him by King Saul, and choosing to fight Goliath with his own weapons – a sling and a knife – David personified the citizen soldier of Florence, and the city's ability to defend itself with its own arms.

Rather than placing Goliath's severed head between or underneath the David's feet, Michelangelo carved the stump of a tree on the back of the right leg, a device conventionally employed by sculptors in ancient times to help support the weight of a statue. In a contemporary document the stump was called broncone, the same Italian word used for Lorenzo de' Medici's personal emblem, or impresa – a dead branch of laurel sprouting new green growth. Soon after David's installation in front of the Palazzo della Signoria, certain adornments were added that have since disappeared: the stump and the strap of the sling were gilded, a vine of copper leaves was strung around the groin covering the genitals, and a laurel wreath of gilt bronze was added.

The gilt garland of leaves did not entirely negate the figure's erotic aura. Machiavelli penned a brief text in satirical vein describing the laws of an imaginary society devoted to seeking pleasure. Its people were required to violate all the normal rules of society and decorum, and were punished with even more pleasurable tasks if they failed to satisfy these demands. For example, women offenders would be forced to gaze at the David closely, "with eyeglasses" (a notable product of the city).

According to Paoletti, a naked colossus situated in the primary public space of the city was necessarily politically charged, the David's nakedness being more than merely a reference to the sculpture of antiquity that inspired the arts in the Italian Renaissance. Standing at the entrance to Florence's town hall, it had power as a political symbol, using an image of the sexualized human body to represent the corporality of the Florentine body politic. As a civic metaphor, it resonated with the everyday life experiences of 16th-century Florentine people among all the social classes.

== Pedestal ==
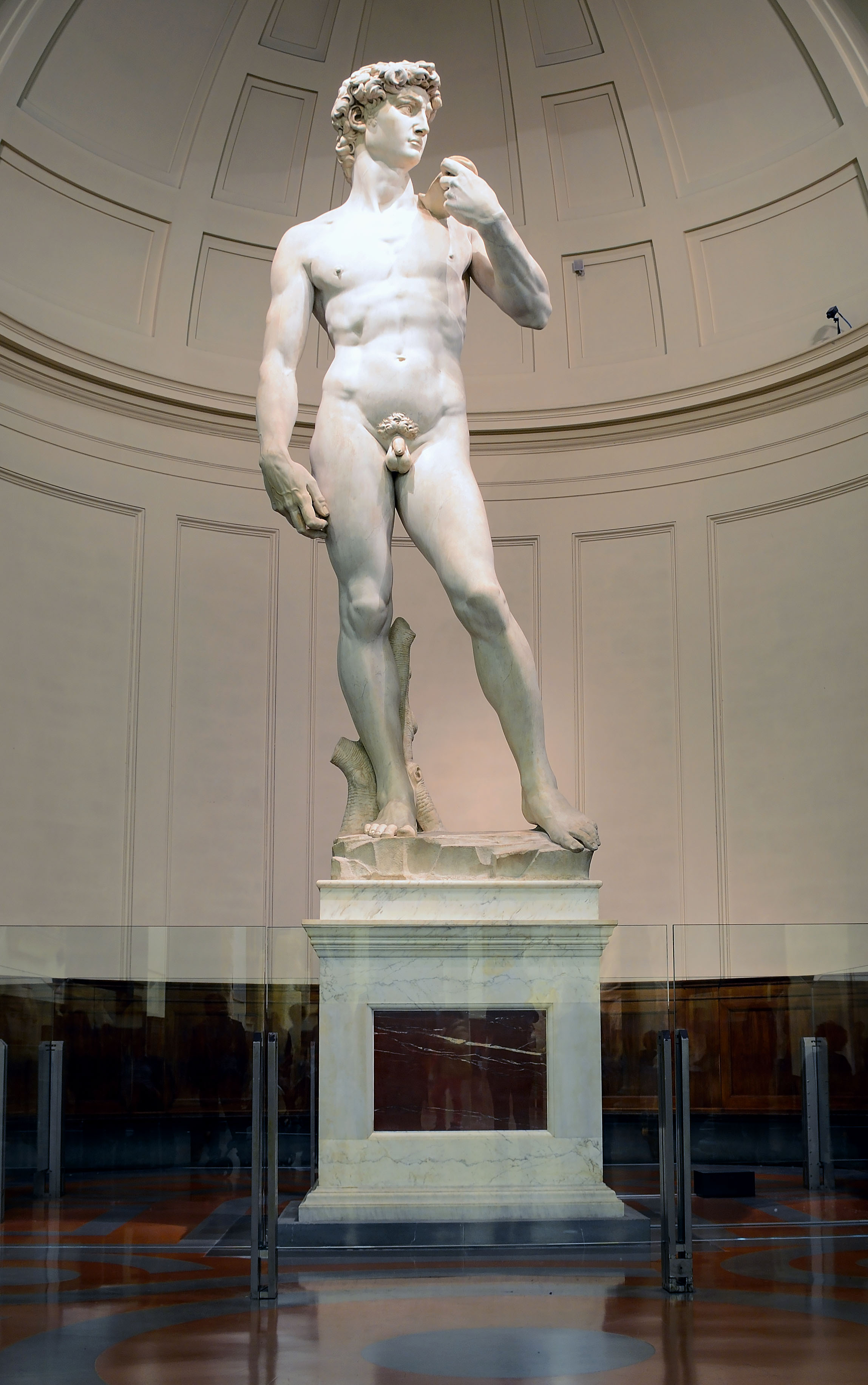
The David with its present-day pedestal

Kathleen Weil-Garris Brandt makes the case that pedestals are of great significance for Renaissance sculpture, and, following Rosalind Krauss, that it is the support, not the statue itself that decides the monumentality of a work of sculpture. She describes how the pedestal that supports the David has been neglected in the literature as a component of Michelangelo's extraordinary achievement with his completion of the statue, and is usually not seen in photographs. The bases of most Renaissance statues have historically suffered a similar fate. When Michelangelo was young, pedestals were seldom a matter of much consideration to the sculptor; free‑standing sculpture executed by contemporaries was rare and was made to surmount antique or new columns. Imbasamento is the Italian word generally used for the supports of sculpture; these and other kinds of pedestals were customarily made by scarpellini, that is, professional carvers of architectural ornament, or ideally by other sculptors.

On 11 June 1504, the architects in charge of the transportation of the statue to the Palazzo della Signoria, Simone del Pollaiolo and Antonio da Sangallo the Elder, were ordered by the Operai of the Cathedral to make a marble base subtus et circum circa pedes gigantis (underneath and around the feet of the giant). Because the David was already situated, the pedestal apparently consisted of a sheath surrounding a core rather than a solid block of stone meant to support the weight of the statue. As it was architects who built and installed the pedestal, they have been credited entirely for its execution, but Brandt thinks it more likely to have been Michelangelo's idea.

According to Brandt, the David marked a pivotal event in the history of pedestals: the first still existent use in the Renaissance of an antique architectural socle form to support a sculptural colossus. Practical considerations such as the support's ability to bear the weight and the difficulty of installation were necessarily taken into account, but otherwise its dimensions and form were a matter of free discretion. Nevertheless, the pedestal was not an arbitrary decorative element that could be exchanged for another. In one sense it was an extension of the architectural surroundings, but its form responded to the figure it supports. Thereafter, pedestals would become integral parts of sculptures.

Alison Wright, drawing on the work of social historian Richard Trexler, calls the innovative installation of statues in the Piazza della Signoria in 16th-century Florence the "greatest public forum for the display of modern freestanding sculpture in Renaissance Italy", a reflection of the importance given in the city to upholding collective and personal honour. The pedestal created for Michelangelo's colossus was novel in this social context, installed as the terminus of the balustrade that stood before the town hall, the Palazzo della Signoria. Considered within this framing of the performative and ritual functions of the city's important sites, pedestals expressed the will to do honour in public and sacred spaces.

== Conservation ==
Officials responsible for the artistic heritage of Florence had become concerned about the David's physical state by the middle of the 19th century. A cleaning of the statue had apparently occurred about 1746, and in 1813 the sculptor Stefano Ricci gave the statue a gentle cleaning and applied a thin coat of encaustic, consisting of beeswax, possibly mixed with linseed oil, to its surface as a protective coating. The sculptor Lorenzo Bartolini recommended in 1842 that a thorough conservation of the statue should be performed, and, like most of the advisory committee formed in 1504, that the David be moved to the Loggia della Signoria for its protection. In 1843 the sculptor Aristodemo Costoli cleaned the statue with a 50 per cent hydrochloric acid solution that removed the encaustic coating and left the marble surface pitted and porous, damaging the statue far more than the weathering it had suffered in the previous 400 years.

During World War II, David, along with Michelangelo's other sculptures in the Accademia, was packed in sand and entombed in brick to protect it from being damaged.

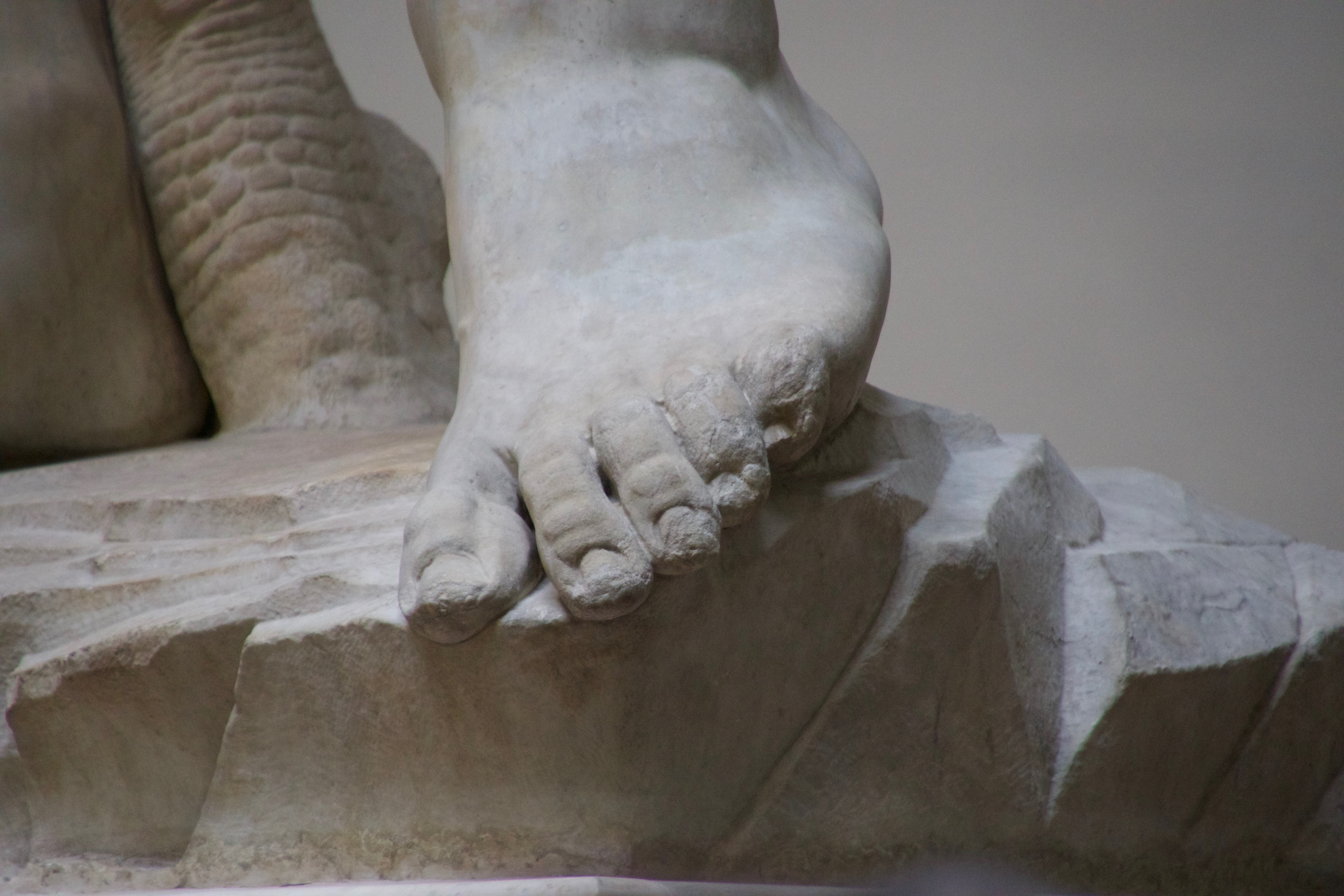
Detail of David's damaged left foot, caused by exposure to the elements and the 1991 incident when a man vandalized it with a hammer

In 1991, the left foot of the statue was damaged by an unemployed Italian man named Piero Cannata, who was carrying a hammer he had hidden under his jacket and broke off the tip of the second toe. The samples obtained from that incident allowed scientists, utilizing spectroscopic, isotopic and petrographic analysis simultaneously, to determine that the marble used was obtained from the Fantiscritti quarries in Miseglia, the central of three small valleys in Carrara. The chemists and spectroscopists who conducted these tests say the marble of the David consists entirely of the mineral calcite.

Because of the marble's surface degradation, on the eve of the 500th anniversary of the sculpture's unveiling in 2004 the statue was given its first major cleaning since 1843. A scientific committee was formed to advise in the restoration. The committee was composed of university professors and scientists from the Consiglio Nazionale delle Ricerche (National Research Council) and the Opificio delle Pietre Dure, a government art-restoration department. They carried out tests and analyses and determined that the statue should be cleaned by poultices soaked in distilled water and applied to the sculpture's surface. Agnese Parronchi, the restorer originally selected by Florentine museums superintendent Antonio Paolucci, assessed the David's condition herself by examining hundreds of photographs and performing a series of tests. Consequently, she opposed the committee's pre-specified method, fearing further deterioration, and insisted that it should be cleaned dry, with soft brushes and motorized erasers. Paolucci demanded that she use the wet pack method instead, but Parronchi refused. After Parronchi resigned, restorer Cinzia Parnigoni undertook the job of restoring the statue under the direction of Franca Falletti, director of the Accademia Gallery.

Researchers at the University of Siena (Università di Siena) performed an investigation of the small cavities, about a millimetre in diameter and of irregular distribution, with which the marble surface of the David is covered. Their macroscopic examination determined that the cavities have not resulted from deterioration of the stone, but rather that they can be attributed to the mineralogical structure of the marble taken from quarries in the Apuan Alps. The local quarrymen in their dialect call those less than a millimetre in size taròli and those several millimetres or larger they call tarme. Observation with optical fibres and magnifying lenses shows that the marble immediately surrounding the cavity may present milky white or greyish "halos" averaging a few millimetres wide. Many of them are completely or partly filled with various substances; this deposition is caused by the statue's exposure over centuries to atmospheric agents or to past restoration processes.

As of 2024 temporary scaffolding is erected around the statue every two months and in an operation that takes a half a day, dust and spider's webs are removed using soft-bristled brushes of various sizes and a bristle tipped vacuum cleaner.

=== Replicas ===
Michelangelo's David has stood on display at Florence's Galleria dell'Accademia since 1873. On 29 August 1846, Leopold II, Grand Duke of Tuscany commissioned Clemente Papi, a student of Stefano Ricci, to make a plaster cast of the David. Papi, a master bronze caster, was experienced in making moulds and reproductions, and set about the project in the summer of 1847. He probably used wax to release the mould rather than oil or fat. This was less damaging than the encaustic wax used by Ricci in 1813, but residue from the gypsum of the plaster mould appears to be present in places where removing coatings is difficult, such as between the David's toes.

This cast was to be moved to various locations in the city to determine their suitability for the statue. Papi first made two plaster replicas of the marble David from his moulds, one of which was given in 1857 by Leopold II to Queen Victoria of England. A decree by the Tuscan state on 2 October 1858 ordered the casting of the entire figure of the David, which Papi completed in August 1866, sending the finished statue to the 1867 Paris Exposition the next year. His intention had always been to cast a bronze replica, and this cast was eventually raised on the Piazzale Michelangelo in 1875 to commemorate the fourth centenary of Michelangelo's birth.

The statue sent to Queen Victoria was intended as a diplomatic gesture by Duke Leopold II to assuage any ill feelings caused by his refusal to allow the sending of a notable Domenico Ghirlandaio painting from Florence to London. Apparently Queen Victoria was surprised to receive such a gift, and gave the statue to the newly opened South Kensington Museum, now the Victoria and Albert Museum. Papi's copy, which was sent to the Accademia di delle Belle Arti of Florence where it resides in the Gipsoteca (Gallery of Plaster Casts) of the Istituto Statale d'Arte, has been used to make all subsequent casts of the David.

The plaster cast of David at the Victoria and Albert Museum has a detachable plaster fig leaf which is displayed nearby. The fig leaf was created in response to Queen Victoria's apparent shock upon first viewing the statue's nudity, and was hung on the figure by means of two strategically placed hooks prior to royal visits.

On 12 November 2010, a fibreglass replica of David was installed atop a buttress on a corner of the north tribune below the roofline of Florence Cathedral for a week. Photographs of the installation reveal the statue the way the Operai who commissioned the work originally expected it to be seen.

Michelangelo's statue is the best known and the most often reproduced of all the artistic works created in Florence. Later reproductions have been made in plaster and in simulated marble fibreglass, signifying an attempt to lend an atmosphere of culture even in some unlikely settings such as beach resorts, gambling casinos and model railroads. Some parody reproductions feature uncharacteristic embellishments, such as a 1966 reproduction, called "Leather David", that captured attention in San Francisco for portraying David in leather attire.

== See also ==
- List of works by Michelangelo
- List of tallest statues

== Bibliography ==
External videos
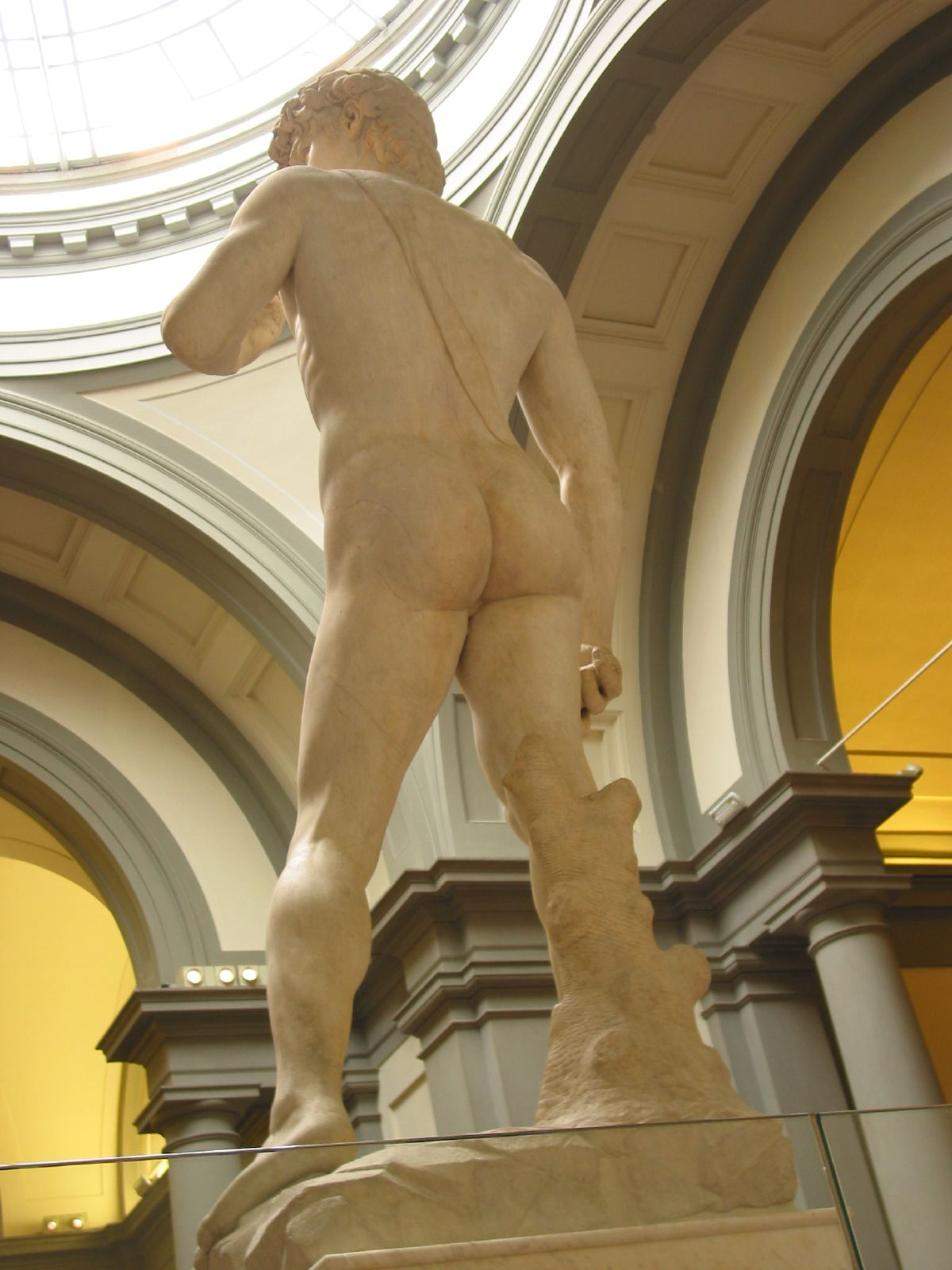
- Michelangelo's David, Smarthistory

- Coonin, Arnold Victor (2014). From Marble to Flesh: The Biography of Michelangelo's David. Florence: B'Gruppo. ISBN 978-88-97696-02-5.
- Goffen, Rona (2002). Renaissance Rivals: Michelangelo, Leonardo, Raphael, Titian. Yale University Press. ISBN 0-300-10589-4.
- Hall, James (2005). Michelangelo and the Reinvention of the Human Body. New York: Farrar, Straus and Giroux.
- Hartt, Frederick (1982). Michelangelo: The Complete Sculpture. New York: Abrams Books.
- Hibbard, Howard (1974). Michelangelo. New York: Harper & Row.
- Hirst, Michael (2000), "Michelangelo in Florence: David in 1503 and Hercules in 1506", The Burlington Magazine, vol. 142, pp. 487–492
- Hughes, Anthony (1997). Michelangelo. London: Phaidon.
- Levine, Saul (1974), "The Location of Michelangelo's David: The Meeting of January 25, 1504", The Art Bulletin, vol. 56, pp. 31–49
- Natali, Antonio; Michelangelo (2014). Michelangelo Inside and Outside the Uffizi. Florence: Maschietto. ISBN 978-88-6394-085-5.
- Poeschke, Joachim (1996). Michelangelo and His World: Sculpture of the Italian Renaissance. Harry N. Abrams. ISBN 978-0-8109-4276-9.
- Pope-Hennessy, John (1996). Italian High Renaissance and Baroque Sculpture. An Introduction to Italian Sculpture. Vol. III (Revised 4th ed.). London: Phaidon.
- Seymour, Jr., Charles (1967). Michelangelo's David: A Search for Identity. Mellon Studies in the Humanities. Pittsburgh: University of Pittsburgh Press.
- Vasari, Giorgio (1963) [First published 1550/1568]. "Life of Michelangelo". The Lives of the Artists (? ed.). London: Penguin. pp. 325–442.
