= La lettrice =

Sculpture by Pietro Magni

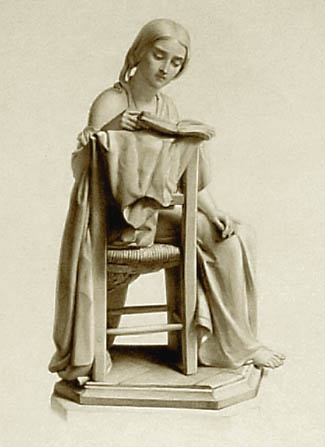
Pietro Magni: La lettrice

La Lettrice, also known as "Reading Girl", is a marble sculpture created by Pietro Magni in 1856, the original version is kept at the Galleria d'Arte Moderna (Milan),

== Details ==
Unlike traditional sculptures, La Lettrice does not have an unexpressive goddess face, instead it has human facial expressions. The girl is sitting on a chair with no shoes, reading a book written by poet and playwright Giovanni Battista Niccolini. On the original sculpture, lines from the text can be read: one of them is celebrating the freedom of Lombardy from Austrian Empire persecution after the Revolutions of 1848 with an emotive expression with a tear on her cheek. La Lettrice represent Italy as a young nation coming into maturity.

== Further versions ==
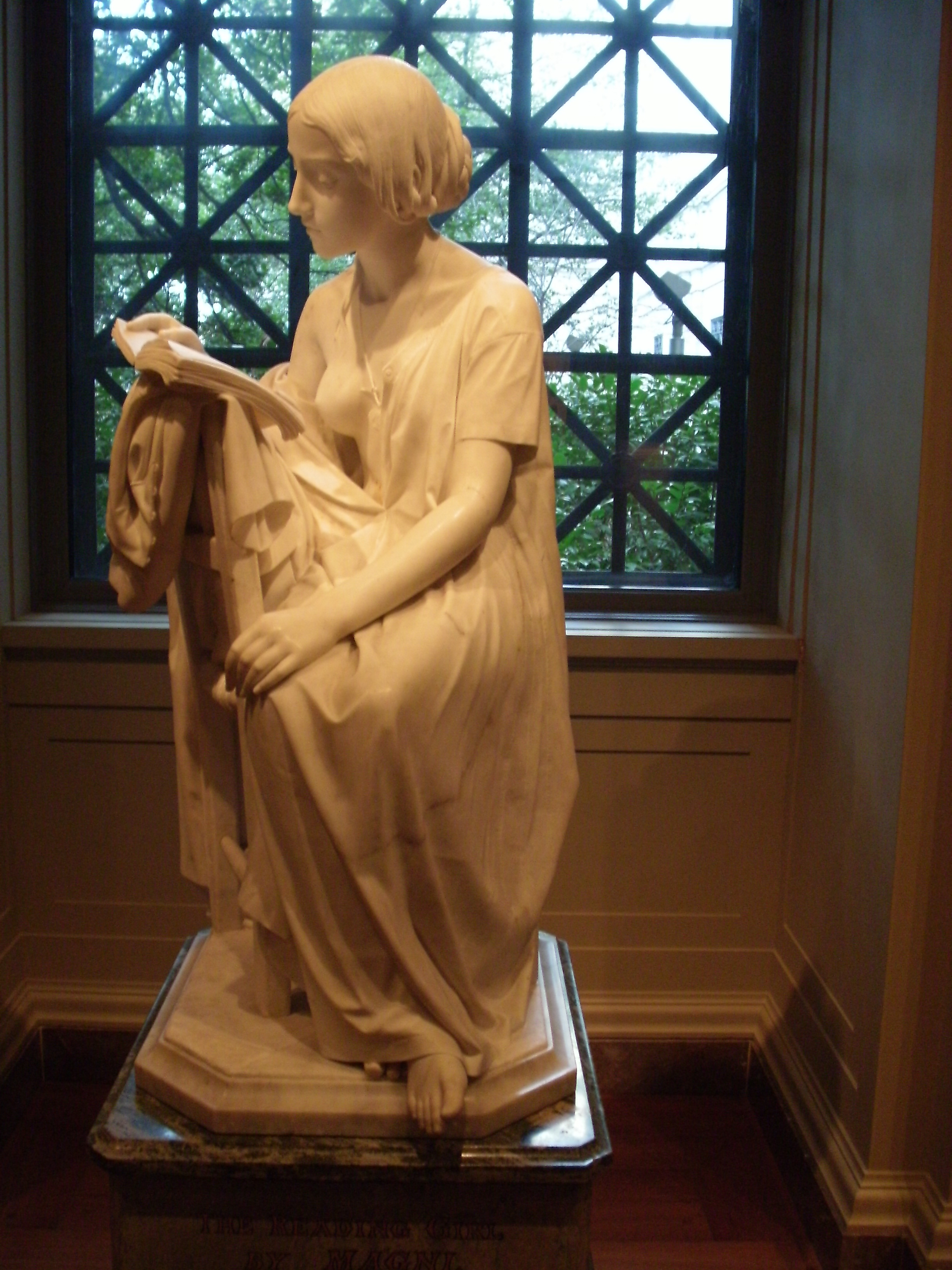
Version of Girl Reading in the National Gallery of Art

After the creation of the original sculpture, other versions were created and can be seen in other places, another version of La Lettrice can be seen at the National Gallery of Art.

== See also ==
- Pietro Magni (sculptor)
- Galleria d'Arte Moderna (Milan)
- National Gallery of Art
- Giovanni Battista Niccolini
