= Giovanni Battista Niccolini =

Italian poet and playwright (1782–1861)

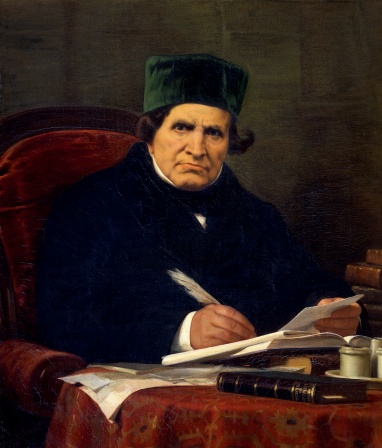
- 1864 portrait by Stefano Ussi
- Born: 29 October 1782; Bagni San Giuliano, Grand Duchy of Tuscany
- Died: 20 September 1861 (aged 78); Florence, Kingdom of Italy
- Resting place: Santa Croce, Florence
- Occupations: poet and playwright
- Parent(s): Ippolito Niccolini and Settimia Niccolini (née da Filicaia)

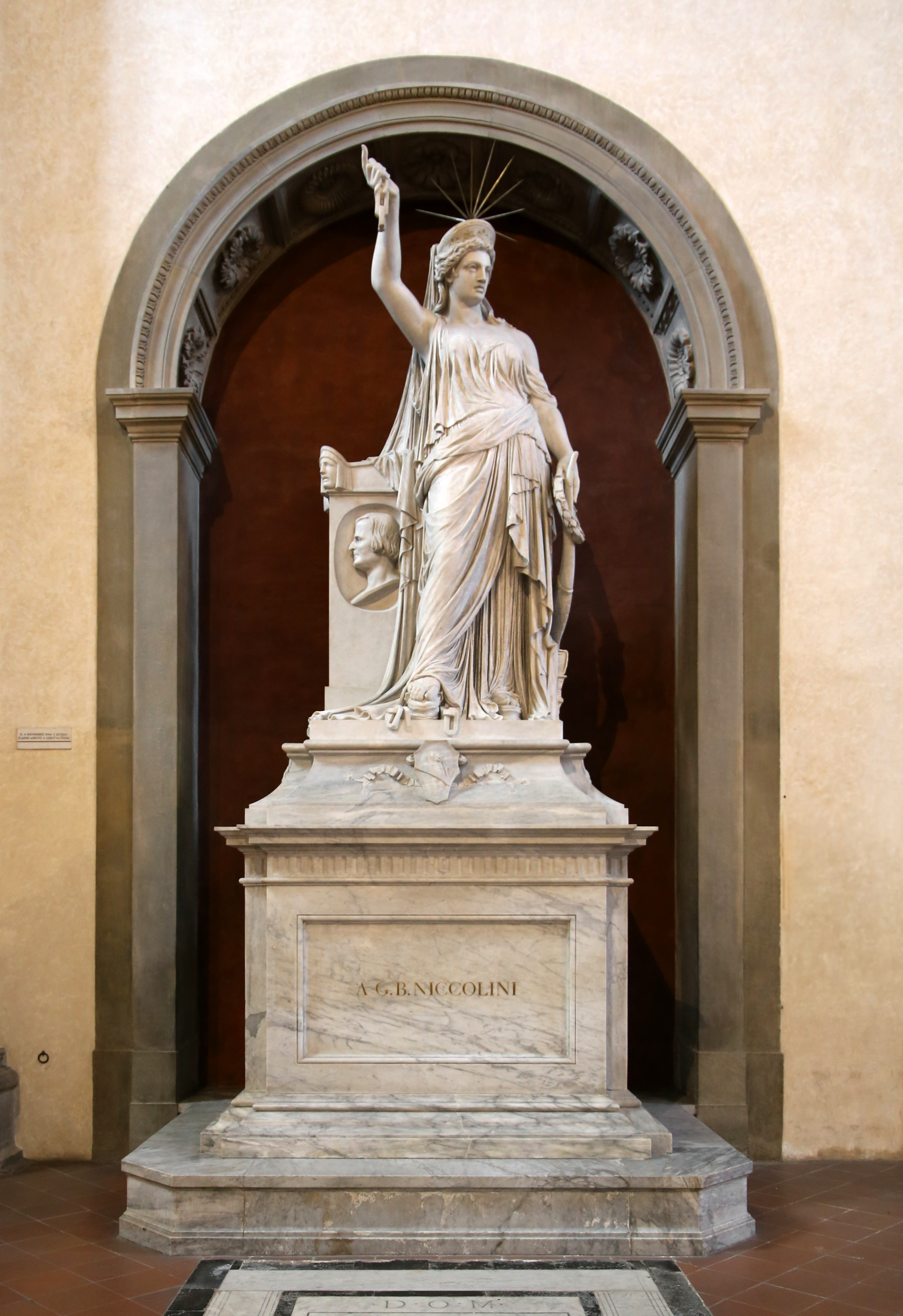
Niccolini Memorial Statue depicting Freedom of Poetry (1870-1876), Santa Croce, Florence, sculpture by Pio Fedi

Giovanni Battista Niccolini (29 October 1782 – 20 September 1861) was an Italian poet and playwright of the Italian unification movement or Risorgimento.

== Life ==
In 1782, Niccolini was born in Bagni San Giuliano to a family of limited means. He initiated studied in law at the University of Pisa, but also pursued studies in classical languages. After graduation, he lived and worked in Florence, partly for the Accademia della Crusca. The upheavals of the Napoleonic era and the early death of his father led him to seek employment. In 1807, he was named professor of history and mythology at the Accademia di Belle Arti of Florence. He also served as librarian and tutor. Despite his republican leanings, he was spared retribution by the administration of the returning Grand Duke Ferdinand III, and obtained a post as Palatine librarian.

His earlier, more neoclassical tragedies, beginning with a Euripidean Polissena (1810), displaying patriotic, anti-absolutist ideas, were favourably received. A few years later he translated Aeschylus' Seven Against Thebes and Aeschylus' Agamemnon.

Over the years, Niccolini became more attached to the scholarly pre-eminence of classic learning, but also to the pre-eminence of the Tuscan dialect and writers such as Dante. In 1817 he became a member of the Accademia della Crusca.

In the 1820s, an unexpected inheritance from his maternal family gave him some financial stability. In 1827, his play Foscarini, was mostly praised by audiences, although maligned by others for presumed anti-Catholic themes.

His next play (1831) based on the controversial history of Giovanni da Procida, seen in this work as a defender of Italian liberty, faced opposition by both the French and Austrian diplomats. In 1834, he published another tragedy based on events in Italian history of Ludovico Sforza. This was followed by Rosmunda d'Inghilterra in 1839. In 1847, he published Filippo Strozzi, in which the Florentine hero fights against foreign forces for the liberty of his Tuscany.

In 1846 his play, Arnold of Brescia: A Tragedy. was translated by the English immigrant Theodosia Trollope into English and published. This work was also taken up by Robert Browning. The work evoked the patriotism of those seeking to free Italy from the control of foreign and papal forces.

Niccolini was a friend of Alessandro Manzoni and Ugo Foscolo. The latter dedicated to him one of his earliest works, the Italian translation of Catullus' Coma Berenices (1803). He was one of the founding editors of the Florentine literary magazines Il Saggiatore and Antologia, in which he published many essays.

In 1848 Niccolini was appointed to the Tuscan Senate, but from 1848 onwards he took little part in actual politics and eventually accepted the idea of an Italian monarchy. He died in Florence in 1861. He is buried in the Church of Santa Croce, Florence close to Machiavelli.

== Works ==
- Polissena (1810)
- Edipo (1810–15)
- Ino e Temisto (1810–15)
- Medea (1810–15)
- Nabucco (1815)
- Matilde (1815)
- Giovanni da Procida (1817)
- Antonio Foscarini (1823)
- Lodovico il Moro (1833)
- Rosmunda d'Inghilterra (1834)
- Beatrice Cenci (1838)[49]
- Arnaldo da Brescia (1840)
- Le Coefore (1844)
- Filippo Strozzi (1846)
- Mario e i Cimbri (1848)

== On popular culture ==
Some of his words were used in the book reading by La lettrice sculpture created by Pietro Magni.

== Legacy ==
There is a Via Giovanni Battista Niccolini in Chinatown in Milan.

== Bibliography ==
- Bellorini, Egidio (1934). "NICCOLINI, Giovanni Battista". Enciclopedia Italiana. Rome: Istituto dell'Enciclopedia Italiana.
- Veca, Ignazio (2013). "NICCOLINI, Giovanni Battista". Dizionario Biografico degli Italiani (in Italian). Vol. 78: Natta–Nurra. Rome: Institute of the Italian Encyclopaedia. ISBN 978-88-12-00032-6.
