= Pietro Magni (sculptor) =

Italian sculptor (1817–1877)

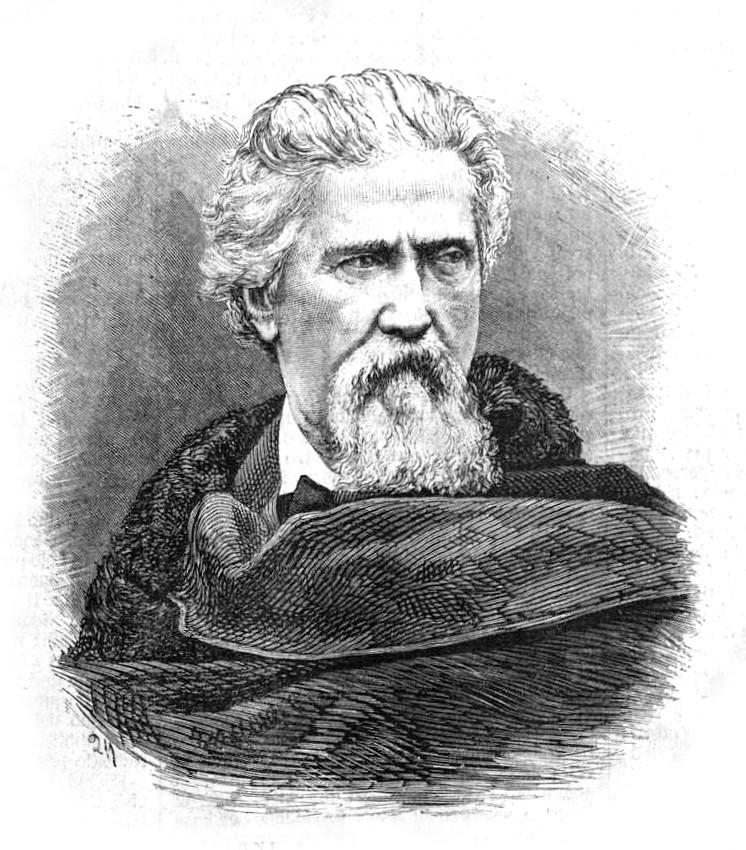
Pietro Magni

Pietro Magni (October 21, 1817 – January 20, 1877) was an Italian sculptor. He is best known for his Girl Reading, first carved in 1856; today the original may be seen in Galleria d'Arte Moderna, Milan, while copies exist in numerous other museum collections, e.g. in Palácio Nacional da Ajuda, Lisbon. Among Magni's other works are a public monument to Leonardo da Vinci on Piazza della Scala and several marble sculpture groups; he also executed statues for the Milan Cathedral in the 1860s.

== Biography ==
Born in Milan, he studied at that city's Accademia di Belle Arti di Brera before moving to the workshop of Abbondio Sangiorgio. Later in his career he became influenced by Tuscan sculptor Lorenzo Bartolini, whose work he first encountered in 1837.

He made the traditional study trip to Rome, where, in 1849, during the unrest of the Risorgimento, he joined Giuseppe Garibaldi’s ranks. Later returning to Rome, he achieved public prominence with his statue of David Launching his Slingstone (Galleria d'Arte Moderna, Milan), which won the Premio Canonica at the Brera in 1850 and was exhibited there in 1851 and at the Exposition Universelle in Paris in 1855.

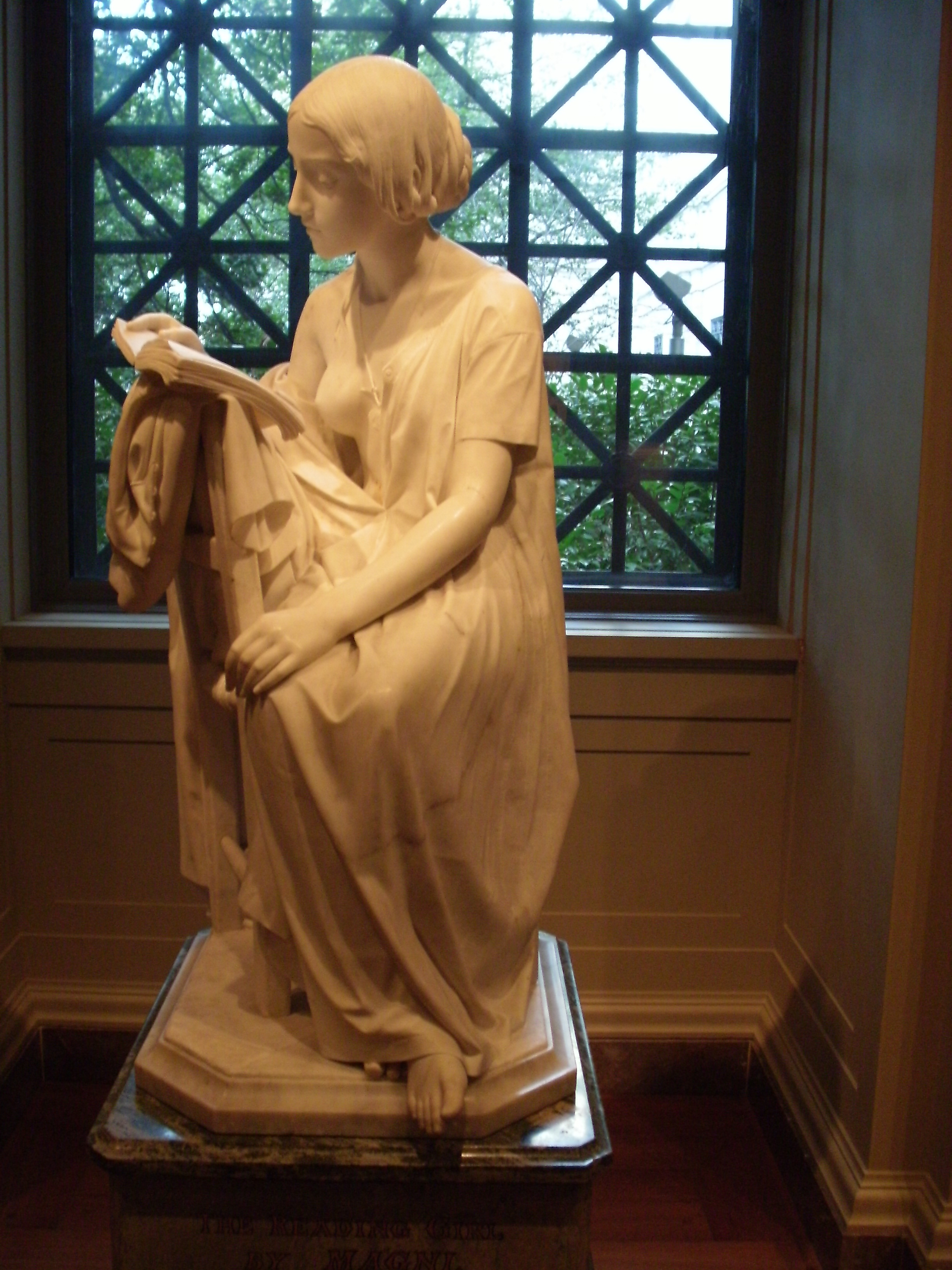
Version of Girl Reading in the National Gallery of Art

At the Brera exhibition of 1853 he received great acclaim for his sober representation of Socrates (Galleria d'Arte Moderna, Milan), but his most famous work is La lettrice (Girl Reading; Galleria d'Arte Moderna, Milan), presented at the Brera in 1856 and copied on several occasions. This statue represents a moment of great formal equilibrium in Magni’s career: it is a model of Romantic sculpture, demonstrating the ‘study of reality, inspiration derived from everyday life, emphasis on content rather than form … carefully controlled by soft yet restrained modelling’

This balance was never again achieved by Magni, either in his large marble group of the Nymph Aurisina (1858; Trieste, Revoltella Museum), which is characterized by an excessive display of exaggerated realism, or in his academic monument to Leonardo da Vinci (1859–72; Milan, Piazza della Scala).

In 1860 Magni was appointed to one of the two chairs of sculpture that had been set up following the reorganization of the Accademia di Belle Arti di Brera. Between 1855 and 1867 he worked on the fabric of Milan Cathedral, creating statues of St. John of the Cross (1860), St. Justin (1863) and St. Eligius the Goldsmith (1867) for its exterior. Magni died in Milan in 1877.

== Selected works ==
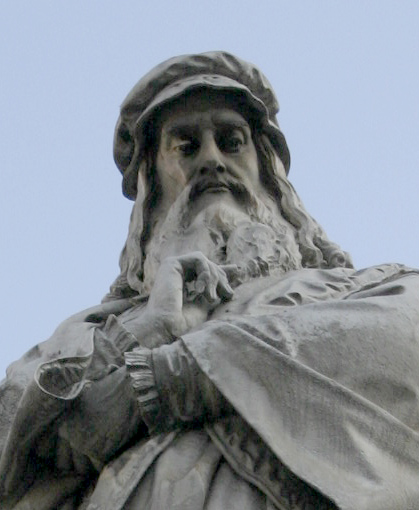
Pietro Magni: Monument to Leonardo da Vinci (particular)

- Davide con fionda, 1850, Milan, Villa Belgiojoso Bonaparte
- Socrate, 1853, Milan, Villa Belgiojoso Bonaparte
- Angelica allo scoglio, c. 1852, Trieste, Revoltella Museum
- La lettrice, 1856, Milan, National Gallery of Art, Washington D. C.
- La ninfa Aurisina, 1858, Trieste, Revoltella Museum
- La Commedia, 1858, Trieste, Revoltella Museum
- Il Canto, 1858, Trieste, Revoltella Museum
- L'Armonia, 1858, Trieste, Revoltella Museum
- La Danza, 1858, Trieste, Revoltella Museum
- Monumento a Leonardo da Vinci, 1859-1872, Milan, Piazza della Scala
- Pasquale Revoltella, 1859, Trieste, Revoltella Museum
- Taglio dell'istmo di Suez, 1863, Trieste, Revoltella Museum
- Il tenore Negrini, c. 1864, Trieste, Revoltella Museum
- The illustrator 1873 - Padua Museo Bottacin
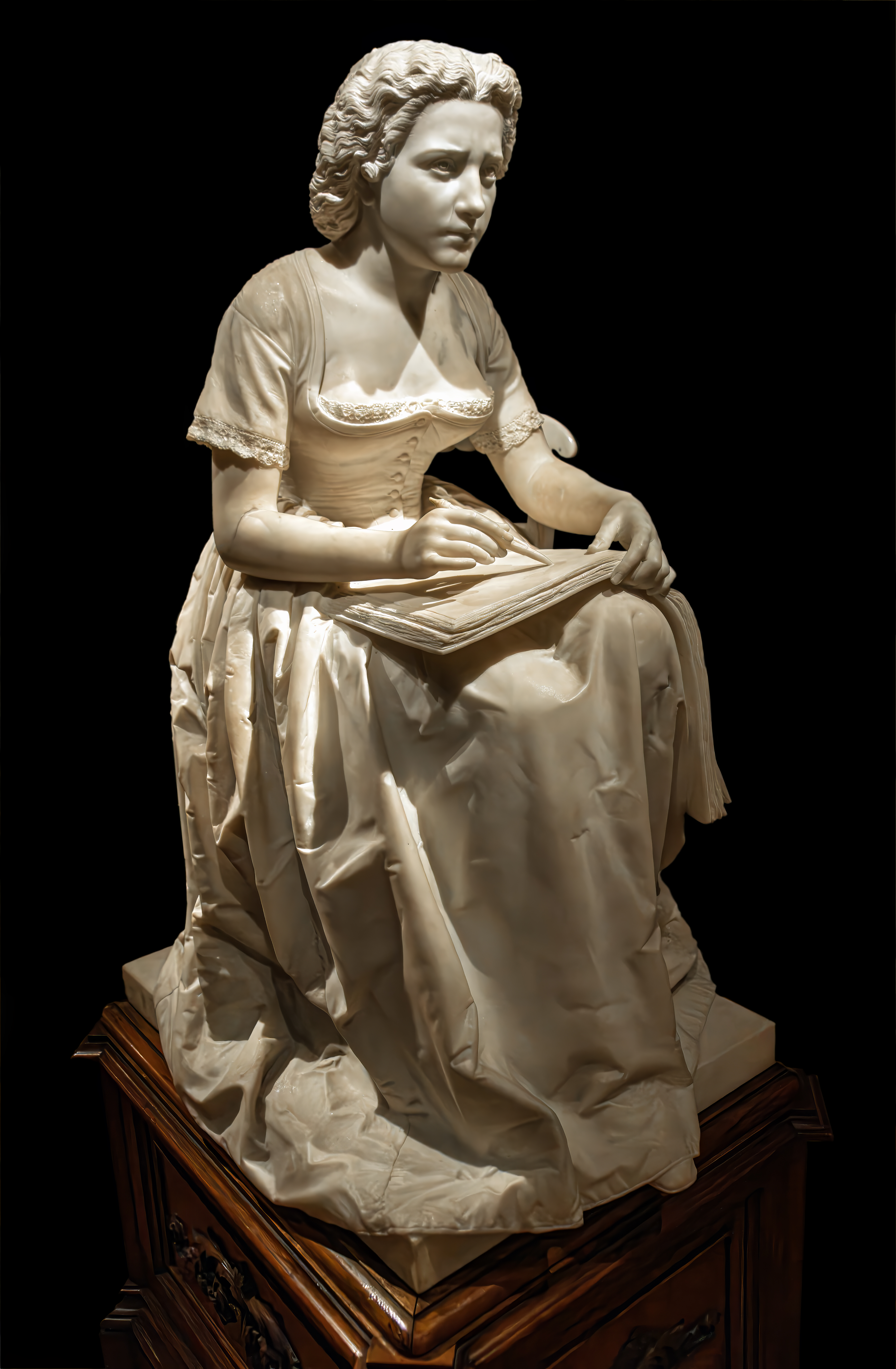
The illustrator 1873 - Padua Museo Bottacin

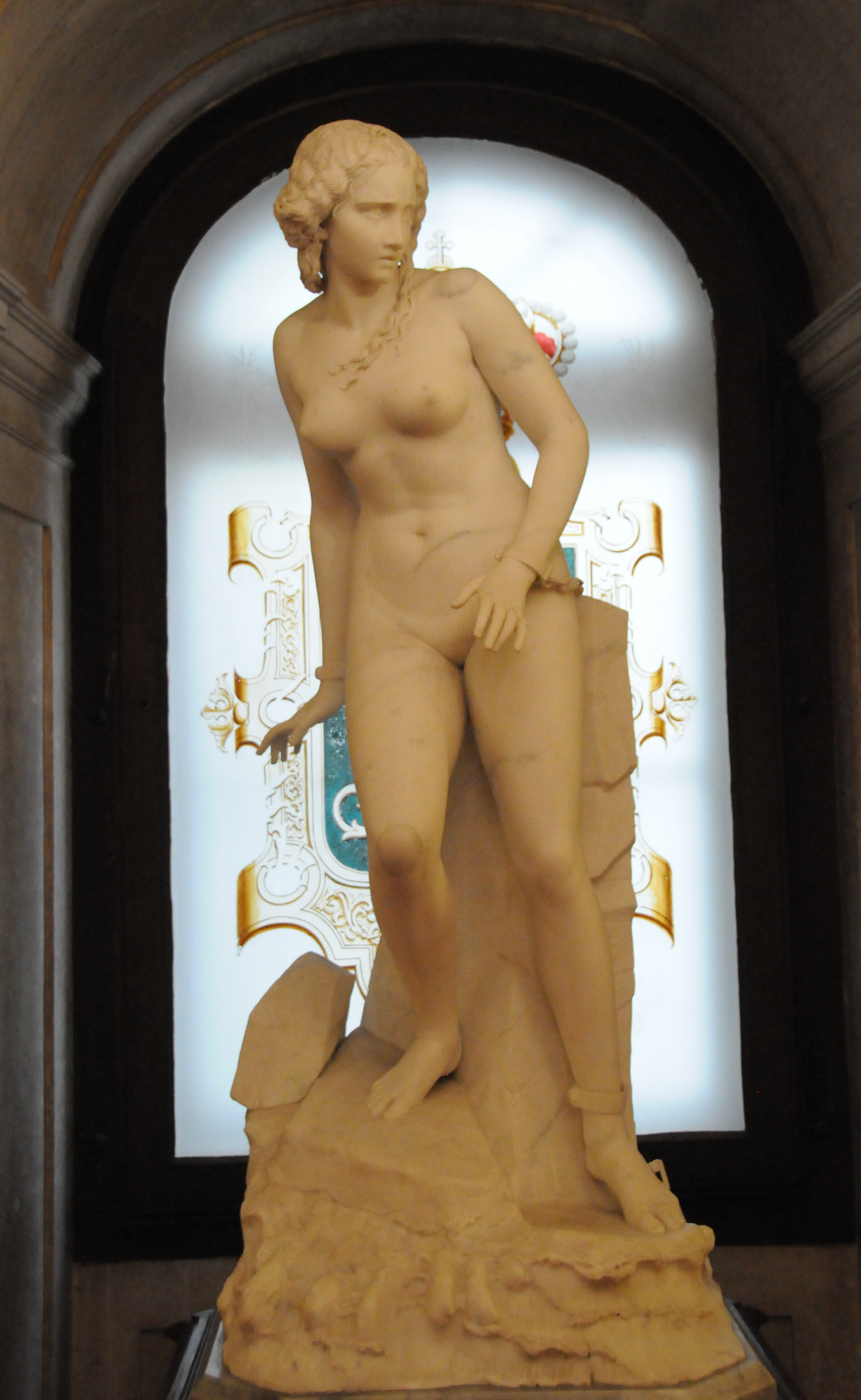
Statue of Andromeda Interior of Palace of Ajuda, Lisbon

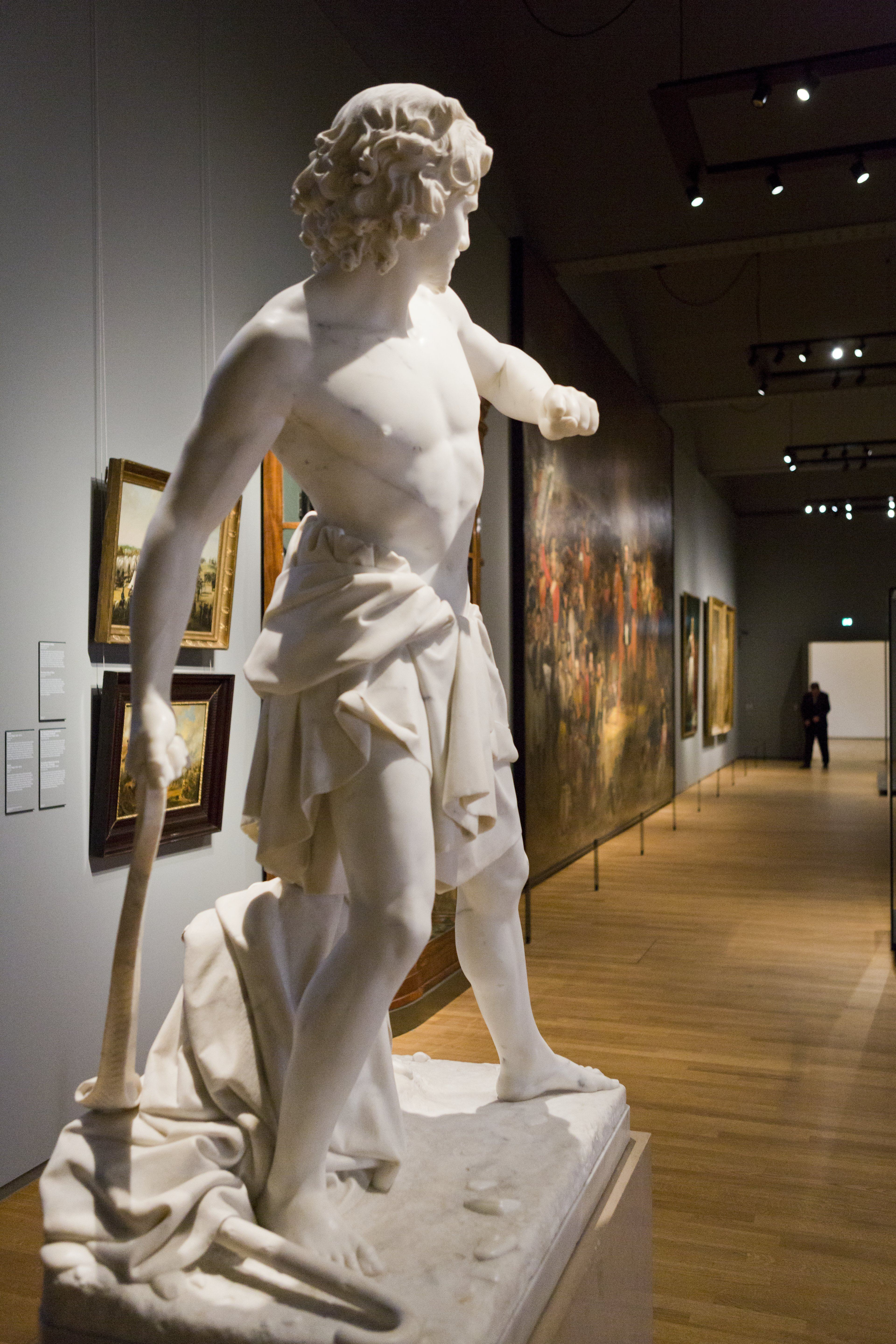
David Launching his Slingstone, Galleria d'Arte Moderna, Milan

== See also ==
- Giovanni Battista Niccolini

== Bibliography ==
- Caimi, A. (1862). Delle arti del disegno e degli artisti nelle provincie di Lombardia dal 1777 al 1862. Milan. pp. 185–7.
- Caimi, A. (1874). Le tre arti considerate in alcuni illustri italiani contemporanei. Milan. pp. 224–9.
- Piceni, Enrico; Cinotti, Mia (1962). "La scultura a Milano dal 1815 al 1915". Storia di Milano. Vol. 15. Milan. OCLC 85179543.
- Bryant, Julius (2002). "Bergonzoli's Amor degli angeli: the Victorian taste for contemporary Latin Sculpture". Apollo. CLVI: 16–21.
