= Elia Lombardini =

Italian engineer

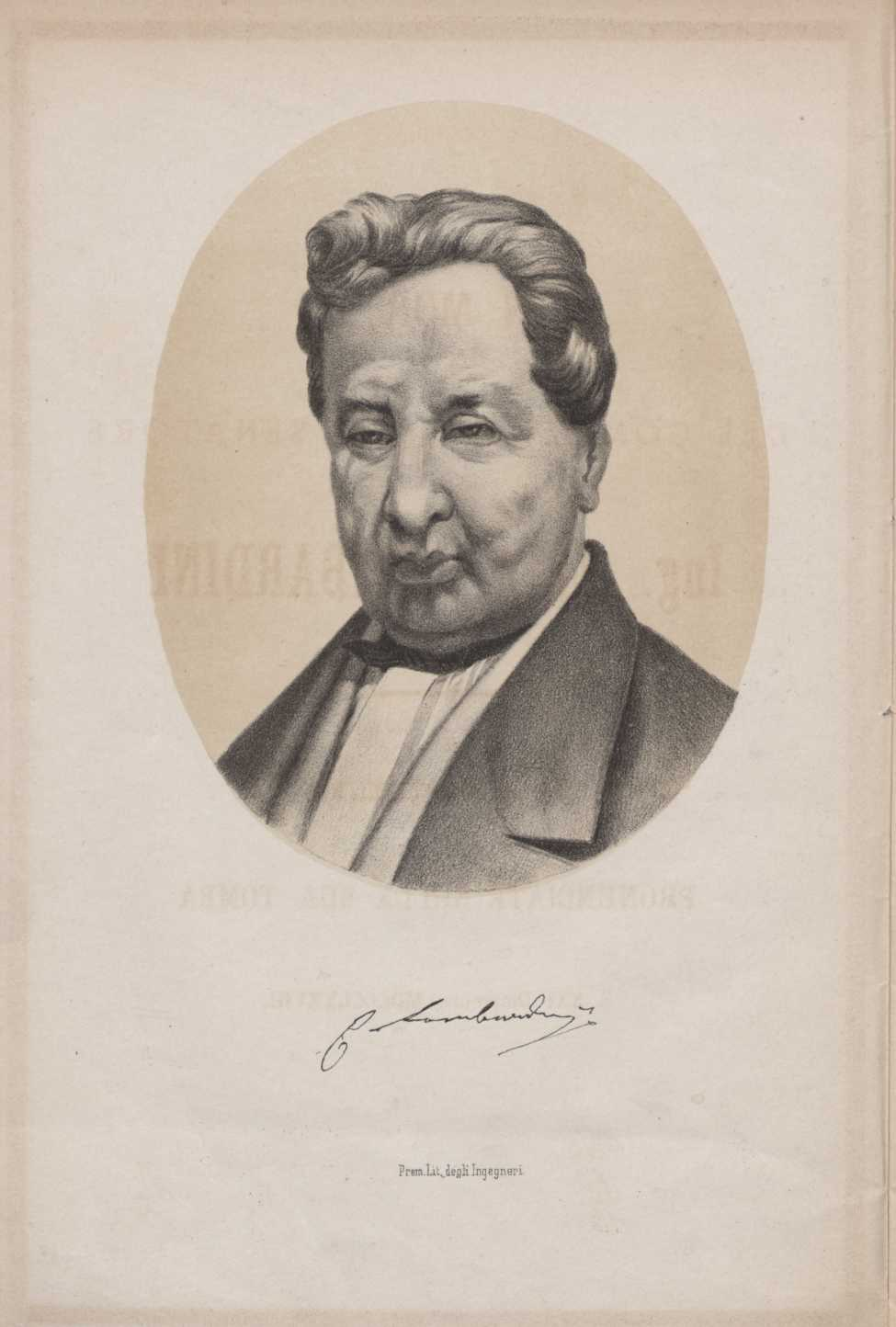
- Born: 11 April 1794; La Broque
- Died: 19 December 1878 (aged 84); Milan
- Occupation: Engineer, hydrologist, architect

Elia Lombardini (11 April 1794 – 19 December 1878) was an Italian engineer and senator.

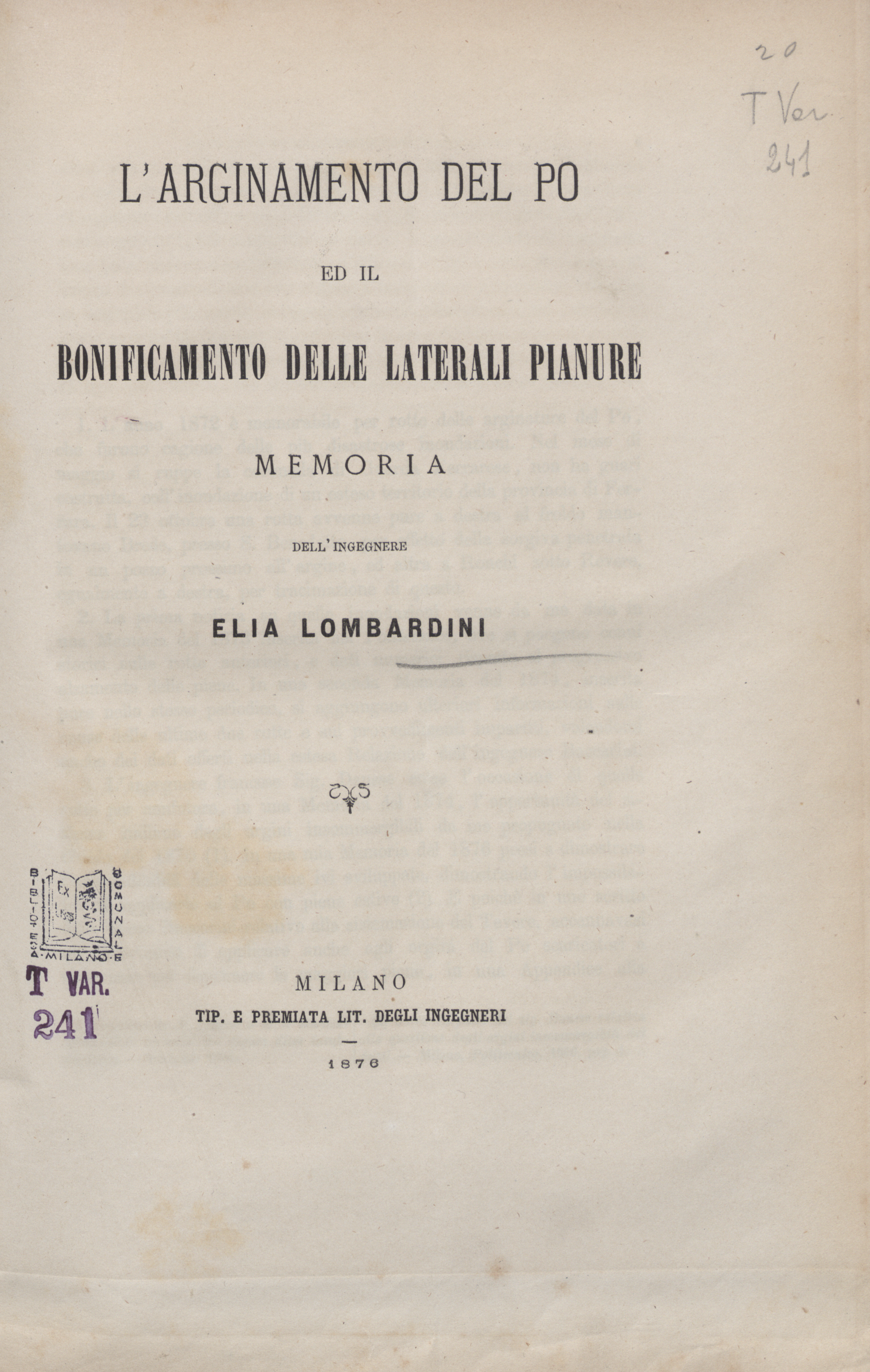
The embankment of the Po and the reclamation of the lateral plains (1876)

== Life ==
He was born in La Broque in 1794. Despite the early death of his father, who was from Cremona and who left his family in serious economic difficulties, Lombardini enrolled at the University of Pavia in 1813, following the curriculum of mathematical studies, but he graduated at the University of Bologna as a pupil of Giuseppe Venturoli. Shortly after, he obtained a position as assistant engineer at the consortium of the Cremonesi arginists and in 1839 he moved to Milan where he served as adjunct inspector for the waters and became a member of the Royal Lombard Institute of Sciences, Letters and Arts, also becoming a friend of Carlo Cattaneo.

He became a general manager of public works in Lombardy, so he was unable to participate in the Five Days of Milan in 1848 due to an illness contracted during a mission to the Duchy of Modena. From his long illness he never fully recovered and in 1856 he obtained an early retirement, also to continue his engineering studies to which he could never fully dedicate himself as he would have liked.

The same year the Austrian Empire conferred on him the honor of order of the crown.

He died in Milan in 1878.

== Works ==
- L'arginamento del Po ed il bonificamento delle laterali pianure. Milan: Tip. e premiata lit. degli Ingegneri. 1876.
- Cenni riassuntivi dei progetti e delle opere intraprese pel prosciugamento e definitivo bonificamento del Lago Fucino e considerazioni su queste ultime. Milan: Prem. lit. e tip. degli Ingegneri. 1875.
- Sulla piena de' fiumi dell'Alta Italia e particolarmente su quella dei fiumi e laghi della Lombardia nell'autunno del 1868. Lago Maggiore e Ticino. Milan: Tipografia e litografia degli Ingegneri. 1869.
- Sulle opere intraprese pel prosciugamento del lago Fucino e su quelle da eseguirsi pel radicale bonificamento del suo bacino. Milan: Tipografia di Dom. Salvi e C. 1862.
- Il voto della commissione provinciale sui progetti di canali irrigui per l'alto milanese e sulla sistemazione dell'emissario del lago Maggiore. Milan: Tipografia degli Ingegneri. 1867.
- Sulle piene de' fiumi e laghi della Lombardia avvenute nel giugno 1855 ed in particolare su quella del lago di Como. [Milan]: [Tipografia Bernardoni]. 1855.
- Della sistemazione dei laghi di Mantova per liberare la città dalle inondazioni e per migliorarne l'aria e la navigazione. [Milan]: [Tipografia Bernardoni]. 1854.
- Sulle piene e sulle inondazioni del Po nel 1872. Milan: Tipografia e litografia degli Ingegneri. 1873.
- Nuove osservazioni sulle opere di bonificamento del lago Fucino. [Milan]: [Tip. e lit. degli Ingegneri]. 1872.
- Osservazioni sul piano di bonificazione del bacino del lago Fucino. [Milan]: [Tip. e lit. degli Ingegneri]. 1872.
- Alcune considerazioni sulla memoria del signor ingegnere Goretti intitolata: Sulla sistemazione dei corsi d'acqua per la pianura destra del basso Po nelle provincie di Ferrara, Modena, Bologna e Ravenna. [Milan]: [Tip. e lit. degli Ingegneri]. 1870.
- Intorno al progetto di abbassare le piene del Lago Maggiore. Milan: Tipografia degli Ingegneri. 1863.
- Nuovo sistema di chiuse con porte ad aprimento spontaneo applicabile tanto ai fiumi quanto agli scaricatori dei canali navigabili e irrigatorii, ed ai canali di scolo per la derivazione delle loro acque. Milan: presso Luigi di Giacomo Pirola. 1839.
- Altre osservazioni sul Po dell'Ingegnere Elia Lombardini colle quali si rettificano alcune cose esposte dal Sig. Ingegnere Stoppani nella memoria sul prolungamento delle linee fluviali. Milan: Tip. di Luigi di Giacomo Pirola. 1843.
- Sulla bonificazione del circondario di Burana coll'attivazione della botte sotto il Panaro e sulla regolazione degli altri scoli superiori dell'antico Bondeno. Milan: Premiata lit. e tip. degli Ingegneri. 1874.
- Nuove considerazioni sulle piene e sulle inondazioni del Po nel 1872 e cenno degli scritti pubblicati su tale argomento. Milan: Tipog. e litog. degli Ingegneri. 1874.
- Sul regime delle acque del progettato canale marittimo di Suez e dei laghi amari interposti. Milan: Tip. Bernardoni. 1859.
