= Girolamo d'Adda =

Italian artist

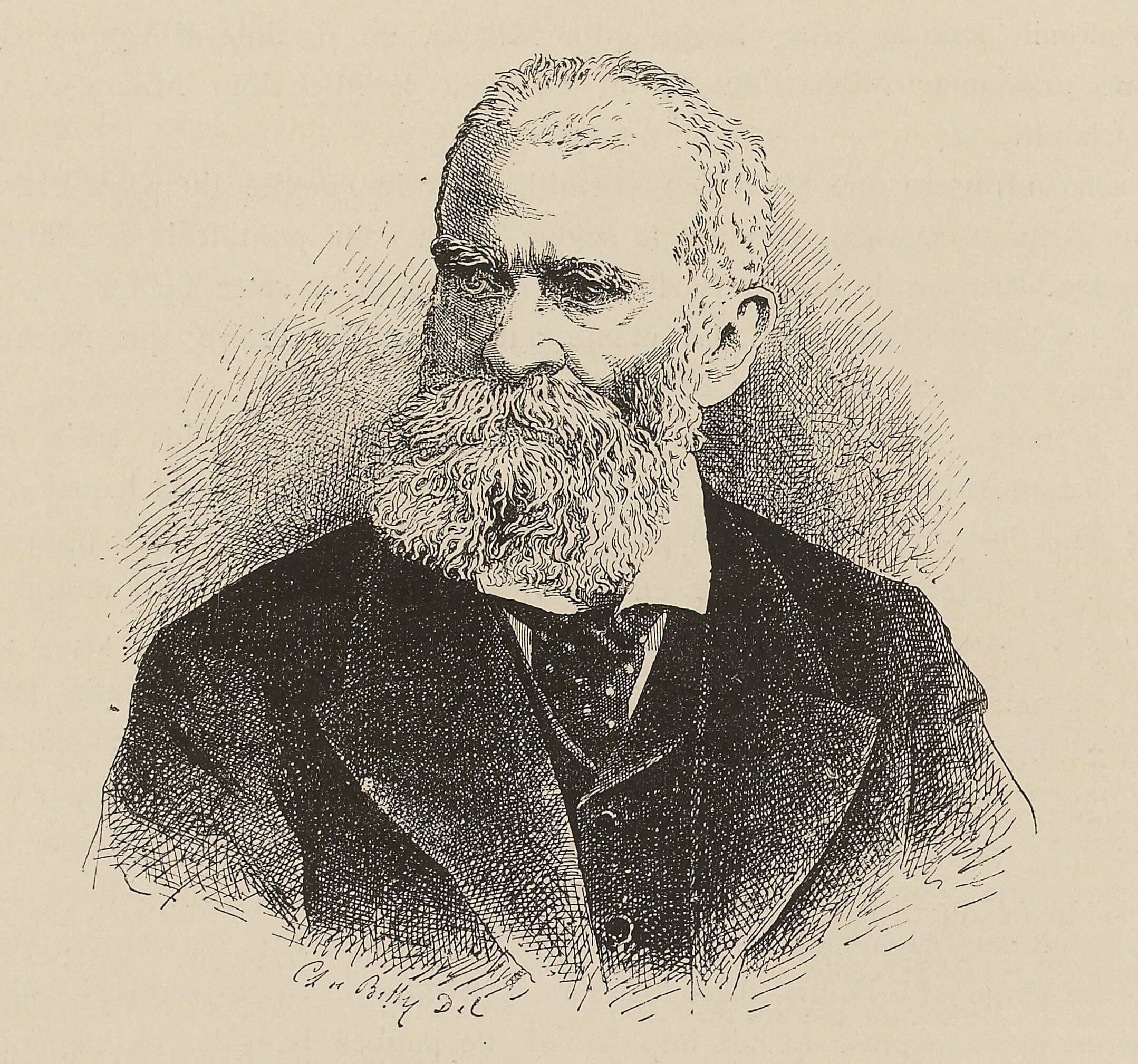
- Born: 19 October 1815; Milan
- Died: 10 September 1881 (aged 65); Milan

Girolamo d'Adda (October 19, 1815 - September 10, 1881) was an Italian politician, writer and literary scholar, as well as an artist and art collector.

== Biography ==
Born in Milan on 19 October 1815, Girolamo d'Adda came from an ancient noble family that traces its origins back to 700 AD. His parents were Gioacchino d'Adda and Elisabetta Pallavicino Trivulzio. In 1824, Girolamo was sent to Novara to study, but he ran away twice and after the demise of his parents in 1830 moved back to Milan. There he was put into l'Imperial Regio Liceo di Porta Nuova, where his classmates were Cesare Correnti and Giulio Carcano. Later he entered the University of Pavia to study Law under Natale Cotta Morandini.

In 1835-36 he traveled around Europe. In 1837 he was finally able to get and manage the fortune he inherited from the parents. After a few years he also got 920.000 Austrian lires as an inheritance from a grandmother, and soon married Ippolita Pallavicino, his mother's cousin.

In 1848, during the Five Days of Milan, with Carlo Tenca and Cesare Cantù he co-authored a document 'Saluto ai fratelli genovesi' (Greeting to the brothers from Genoa) where they addressed small regions of Italy, calling for unification. In that period he grew close to monarchists-unitarians and their leader Cristina Trivulzio Belgiojoso, however, in 1853 he pleaded loyalty to the Emperor after a failed attempt on the life of Franz Joseph I of Austria.

An anti-industrialist, bound to a static conception of the relations between the various strata of society, and confronted with a world that he increasingly criticised for its materialism and atheism, Girolamo d'Adda wrote a foreword for a biography of Benjamin Franklin in which he summarised all these doubts, praising how one of the most famous men in the United States, even as a philosopher, had never disavowed his religious spirit and, even as a republican, had never forgotten to exercise a certain moderation in defining his positions.

In the United Italy he became an influential Milanese, in 1873 he was included in the list of city councilors when the Corpi Santi was merged into Milan. Also in 1873 he and Cesare Cantù co-founded the Historical Society of Lombardy. Through his life, Girolamo d'Adda was a member of several other city councils and also of the Milan Conservatory.

In addition to political and social activities, Girolamo d'Adda was a painter and art collector. He exhibited his paintings at the Brera Academy. As a collector, he was interested not only in artwork, but also in rare books and historical documents. An important achievement as a collector was the discovery and 1866 presentation of a letter, written by Christopher Columbus to Luis de Santangel in 1493. He also published a monograph Note di un bibliofilo (A bibliophile's notes) where he presented his profound analysis and deciphered some excerpts from the Codex Atlanticus. These research became a foundation to further profound discussions and scholarly studies of Leonardo's legacy.

== Sources ==
- Bertoldi, Elisa (1974). "Per Il Collezionismo Milanese Tra Seicento e Settecento: I d'Adda". Vita e Pensiero – Pubblicazioni dell'Università Cattolica del Sacro Cuore. 19 (40). Arte Lombarda: 197–204. JSTOR 43104949.
- Benedetti, Amedeo (1963). Atti della societa Ligure di storia Patria (PDF). Genova: Stamperia Editoria Brigati Tiziana. ISBN 978-88-97099-10-9.
- Passano, Giambattista (1874). I novellieri italiani in prosa indicati e descritti da Giambattista Passano. Libreria antica e moderna di G. Schiepatti. pp. 130–274.
- Moffatt, Constance; Taglialagamba, Sara (2016). Illuminating Leonardo: A Festschrift for Carlo Pedretti Celebrating His 70 Years of Scholarship (1944–2014). BRILL. pp. 11–13. ISBN 978-90-04-30413-0.
- Kyle, Sarah R. (2017). Medicine and Humanism in Late Medieval Italy: The Carrara Herbal in Padua. Routledge. ISBN 978-1-315-27691-5.
- De Gubernatis, Angelo (1879). Dizionario biografico degli scrittori contemporanei diretto da Angelo De Gubernatis. Successori Le Monnier.
