= La Broque =

- Commune
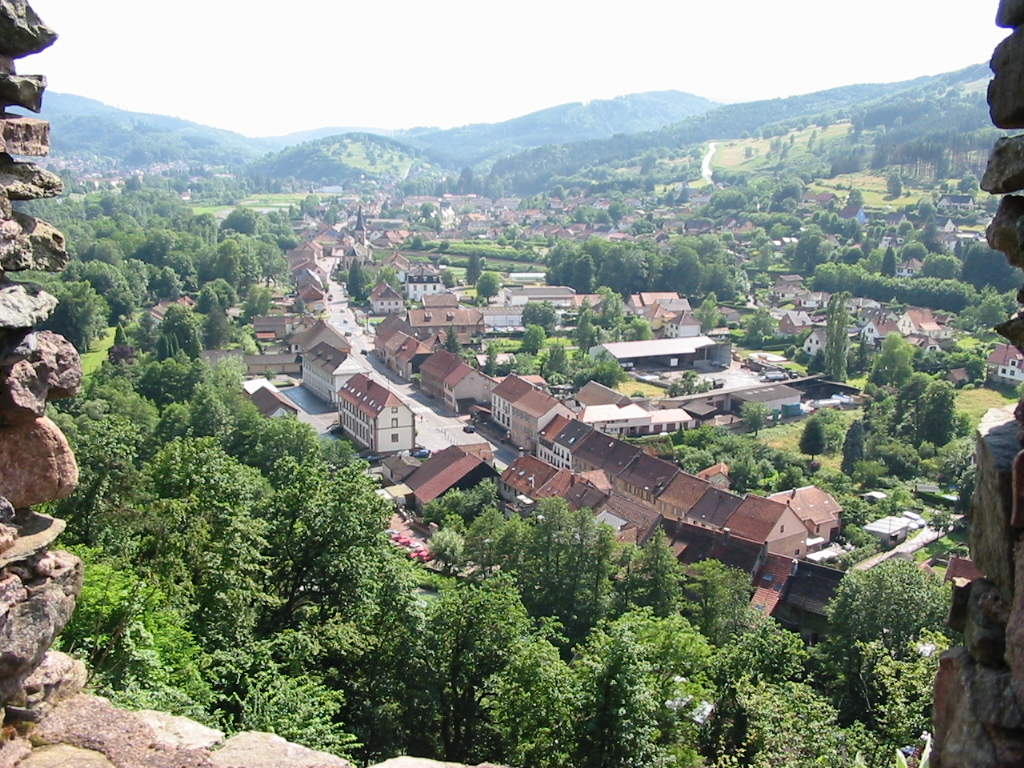
- A general view of La Broque

- Coat of arms
- Location of La Broque
- Location within France Location within Grand Est
- Coordinates: 48°28′39″N 7°13′01″E
- Country: France
- Region: Grand Est
- Department: Bas-Rhin
- Arrondissement: Molsheim
- Canton: Mutzig

Government
  - Mayor (2020–2026): Jean-Bernard Pannekoecke
- Area^{1}: 23.07 km^{2} (8.91 sq mi)
- Highest elevation: 898 m (2,946 ft)
- Lowest elevation: 310 m (1,020 ft)
- Population (2023): 2,625
  - Density: 113.8/km^{2} (294.7/sq mi)
- Time zone: UTC+01:00 (CET)
  - Summer (DST): UTC+02:00 (CEST)
- INSEE/Postal code: 67066 /67130
- ^{1} French Land Register data, which excludes lakes, ponds, glaciers > 1 km^{2} (0.386 sq mi or 247 acres) and river estuaries.

La Broque (French pronunciation: [la bʁɔk]; German: Vorbruck) is a commune in the Bas-Rhin department in the Grand Est region in Northeastern France.

== Population ==
Historical population
Year	Pop.	±% p.a.
1968	3,026	—
1975	3,048	+0.10%
1982	2,896	−0.73%
1990	2,628	−1.21%
1999	2,687	+0.25%
2007	2,761	+0.34%
2012	2,812	+0.37%
2017	2,663	−1.08%
2023	2,625	−0.24%
Source: INSEE

== See also ==
- Communes of the Bas-Rhin department
