= Ridolfi =

Ridolfi is an Italian surname. Notable people with the surname include:

- Achille Ridolfi (born 1979), Belgian stage and film actor
- Andrea Ridolfi (born 1963), Italian musician, composer and orchestra director
- Antonio Ridolfi (1824-1900), Italian painter
- Carlo Ridolfi (1594–1658), Italian art biographer and painter of the Baroque period
- Claudio Ridolfi (1560–1644), Italian painter of the Renaissance period
- Federica Ridolfi (born 1974), Italian dancer and a hostess on television
- Ludovico Ridolfi (1587–1649), Roman Catholic prelate who served as Bishop of Patti
- Luigi Ridolfi Vay da Verrazzano (1895–1958), Italian politician, entrepreneur and sporting director
- Michele Ridolfi (1795–1854), Italian painter and art critic
- Niccolò Ridolfi (1501–1550), Italian cardinal
- Niccolò Ridolfi (Dominican), Italian Master of the Order of Preachers from 1629 to 1642
- Ottavio Ridolfi (1582–1624), Roman Catholic cardinal
- Pietro Ridolfi (bishop) (died 1601), Roman Catholic prelate who served as Bishop of Senigallia and of Venosa
- Pietro Ridolfi (active 1710–1716), Italian engraver of the late-Baroque period
- Roberto Ridolfi, or di Ridolfo (1531–1612), Italian and Florentine nobleman and conspirator
- Sido L. Ridolfi (1913–2004), American Democratic Party politician

== Other ==
- Palazzo Ridolfi-Dalisca, Verona, historical palace located in Verona, northern Italy
- Ridolfi plot, plot in 1571 to assassinate Queen Elizabeth I of England and replace her with Mary, Queen of Scots
