= Napoleon (given name) =

Napoléon is the French form of the Italian given name Napoleone. Notable people with the name include:

== Bonapartes ==
- Napoléon Bonaparte (Napoleon I) (1769–1821), French statesman
- Napoléon Charles Bonaparte (1802–1807), prince of Holland and son of Napoleon I's brother Louis
- Napoléon Louis Bonaparte (1804–1831), King of Holland and son of Napoleon I's brother Louis
- Charles Louis Napoléon Bonaparte, Napoleon III (1808–1873), Emperor of the French and son of Napoleon I's brother Louis
- Napoléon François Joseph Charles Bonaparte, Napoleon II (1811–1832), son of Napoleon I
- Napoléon Joseph Charles Paul Bonaparte (1822–1891), son of Napoleon I's brother Jerome
- Napoléon Charles Bonaparte, 5th Prince of Canino (1839–1899), grandson of Napoleon I's brother Lucien

== Athletes ==
- Napoleón Calzado (born 1977), baseball player from Dominican Republic
- Napoleon Einstein (born 1989), Indian cricketer
- Napoleon Harris (born 1979), American football player
- Napoleon Kaufman (born 1973), American football player
- Napoleon Lajoie (1874–1959), American baseball player
- Napoleon McCallum (born 1963), American football player
- Napoleon Amaefule (born 1980), Nigerian footballer

== Artists ==
- Napoleon D'umo (born 1968), American choreographer
- Napoleon Jones-Henderson (born 1943), American weaver and multimedia artist
- Napoleon Murphy Brock (born 1943), American singer and musician
- Napoleon Orda (1807–1883), Belarusian-Polish musician and artist
- Napoleon Perdis (born 1970), Australian make-up artist

== Military officials ==
- Napoleon Bonaparte Buford (1807–1883), U.S. Army officer and railroad executive
- Napoleon Collins (1814–1875), U.S. Navy admiral
- Napoleon J.T. Dana (1822–1905), U.S. Army officer
- "Alfred" Napoléon Duffié, Franco-American soldier and diplomat
- Napoleon Zervas (1891–1957), Greek general
- Napoleone Orsini (1420–1480), Italian warlord

== Politicians and other leaders ==
- Napoleón Becerra (1964–2026), Peruvian trade unionist, politician, and presidential candidate
- Napoleon B. Broward (1857–1910), American governor of Florida
- Napoleon Bonaparte Brown (1834–1910), American businessman and politician
- Napoléon, comte Daru (1807–1890), French soldier and politician, godson of Napoléon
- José Napoleón Duarte (1925–1990), President of El Salvador
- Napoleon L'Herault (1882–1932), American lawyer and politician
- Napoleon Lemay (1865–1946), Canadian politician from Quebec
- Louis Napoléon Lannes (1801–1874), French nobleman, diplomat and politician, son of marshal Jean Lannes
- Luis Napoleón Morones (1890 – 1964), Mexican politician
- Napoleone della Torre (died 1278), Italian nobleman, Lord of Milan
- Napoleon Wapasha (1854–1925), Sioux chief

== Other ==
- Napoleon Bonaparte (born 1965), Indonesian policeman
- Napoleon Cybulski (1854–1919), Polish physiologist
- Napoleon Whiting (1910–1984), American actor
- Napoleon Chagnon (1938–2019), American anthropologist
- Napoleone Orsini Frangipani (1263–1342), Italian cardinal
- Napoleon Hill (1883–1970), American personal-success author
- Napoleon LeBrun (1821–1901), American architect
- Napoléon Peyrat (1809–1881), French author and historian
- Napoléon Coste (1805–1883), French guitarist
- Napoléon Joseph Ney (1803–1857), French politician
- Napoléon La Cécilia (1835–1878), French general
- Napoleone Boni (1863–1927), Italian painter
- Napoleone Nani (1841–1899), Italian painter

== Fictional ==
- Napoleon "Bony" Bonaparte, a character created by Arthur Upfield
- Napoleon Solo, a character from The Man from U.N.C.L.E.
- Napoleon (Animal Farm), a pig who is a major character and the main antagonist of the George Orwell novel Animal Farm
- Napoleone Di Carlo, a detective created by Italian comic book writer Carlo Ambrosini for the series of the same name published by Sergio Bonelli Editore
- Napoleon Dynamite, the titular main protagonist of the film Napoleon Dynamite
- Muffin, a puppy who calls himself "Napoleon" in the Australian film Napoleon
- Napoleon, the bloodhound from the Disney animated film The Aristocats
