= Napoleone =

Italian male given name

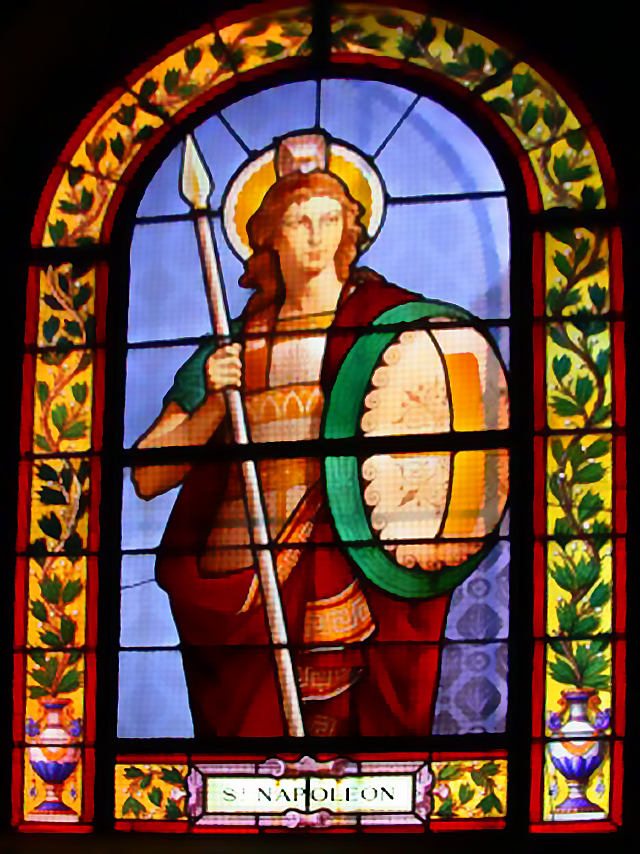
Saint Napoleone

Napoleone is an Italian male given name. Saint Napoleon of Alexandria, alternatively rendered as Neopulus, Neopolus, Neopolis or Neópolo, whose feast day is August 15, was allegedly martyred during the early fourth century during the Diocletianic Persecution.

Gabriele Rosa (1858) followed G. F. Zanetti (1751) in accepting the meaning as "nose of lion", though this etymology is viewed sceptically in later sources such as Pio Rajna (1891).

The form Napoleone is found as early as Napoleone Orsini Frangipani (1263–1342), a Roman Cardinal. Rosa (1858) identified the name from 1240 as a nickname of a member of the Della Torre family of Valsassina.

The French equivalent is Napoléon, anglicised Napoleon. The most famous holder of the Italian and French versions, with whom the name became virtually synonymous, was Napoléon Bonaparte (1769–1821), christened Napoleone di Buonaparte (Nabulione di Buonaparte according to old Corsican spelling). Damiano Morali (1847) identified the given name Napoleone having first entered the Italian Buonaparte family in 1648.

== Notable people ==
- Luca Napoleone (born 1993), Belgian footballer
- Napoleone Angiolini (1797–1871), Italian painter
- Napoleone Boni (1863–1927), Italian painter
- Napoleone Colajanni (1847–1921), Italian writer, journalist, criminologist, socialist and politician
- Napoleone Comitoli (1548–1624), Roman Catholic prelate
- Napoleone della Torre (died 1278), Italian nobleman
- Napoleone Ferrara (born 1956), Italian-American molecular biologist
- Napoleone Moriani (1808–1878), Italian operatic tenor
- Napoleone Nani (1841–1899), Italian painter
- Napoleone Orsini (disambiguation), multiple people
- Napoleone Orsini Frangipani (1263–1342), Roman cardinal
- Napoleone Parisani (1854–1932), Italian landscape and portrait painter
- Napoleone Pini (1835–1907), Italian zoologist and paleontologist
- Napoleone Sommaruga (1848–1906), Italian painter
- Napoleone Verga (1833–1916), Italian painter
