= Zuffi =

Zuffi is an Italian surname. Notable people with the surname include:

- Ambrogio Zuffi (1833–1922), Italian sculptor
- Dario Zuffi (born 1964), Swiss footballer and coach
- Giulia Francesca Zuffi (fl. 1678–1685), Italian opera singer
- Luca Zuffi (born 1990), Swiss footballer, son of Dario
- Piero Zuffi (1919–2006), Italian set designer and painter
