= Lombardy Day =

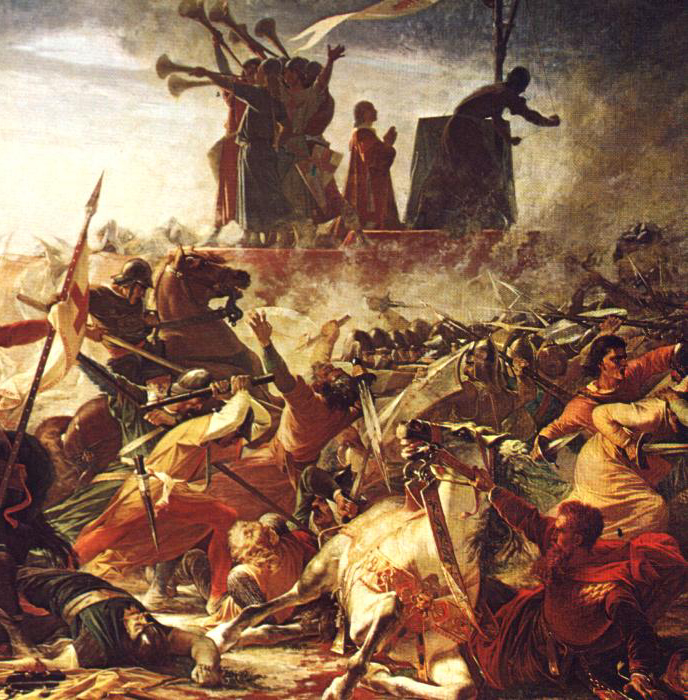
The defence of the Carroccio during the battle of Legnano (1176) by Amos Cassioli (1832–1891)

The Lombardy Day, officially "Festa Regionale della Lombardia", in Lombard language "Festa Regional de la Lombardia", is Lombardy's holy day. Observed on 29 May, it celebrates the victory of the Lombard League against the Emperor in the Battle of Legnano.

The Day was approved by the Lombard Regional Council in 2013, with the support of Lega Nord, Popolo della Libertà, Brothers of Italy and Movimento 5 Stelle.
