= Antonio Ridolfi =

Italian painter

Antonio Ridolfi (1824–1900) was an Italian painter noted for his paintings of sacred and historical subjects, as well as costume genre pieces.

== Biography ==
While born in Mezzana in the Province of Trento, he lived in Siena most of his adult life. He studied under Francesco Nenci and Luigi Mussini at the Art Institute of Siena. He derived a Neoclassic, Purismo style recalling Ingres. He exhibited at Milan, in 1872, depicting Buondelmonte dei Buondelmonti, nel momento in cui gli vien mostrata la Donati. At the 1884 National Exposition of Turin were displayed: Al tempio; Un fiore; and Nel tempio. Other works include Francesca da Rimini.

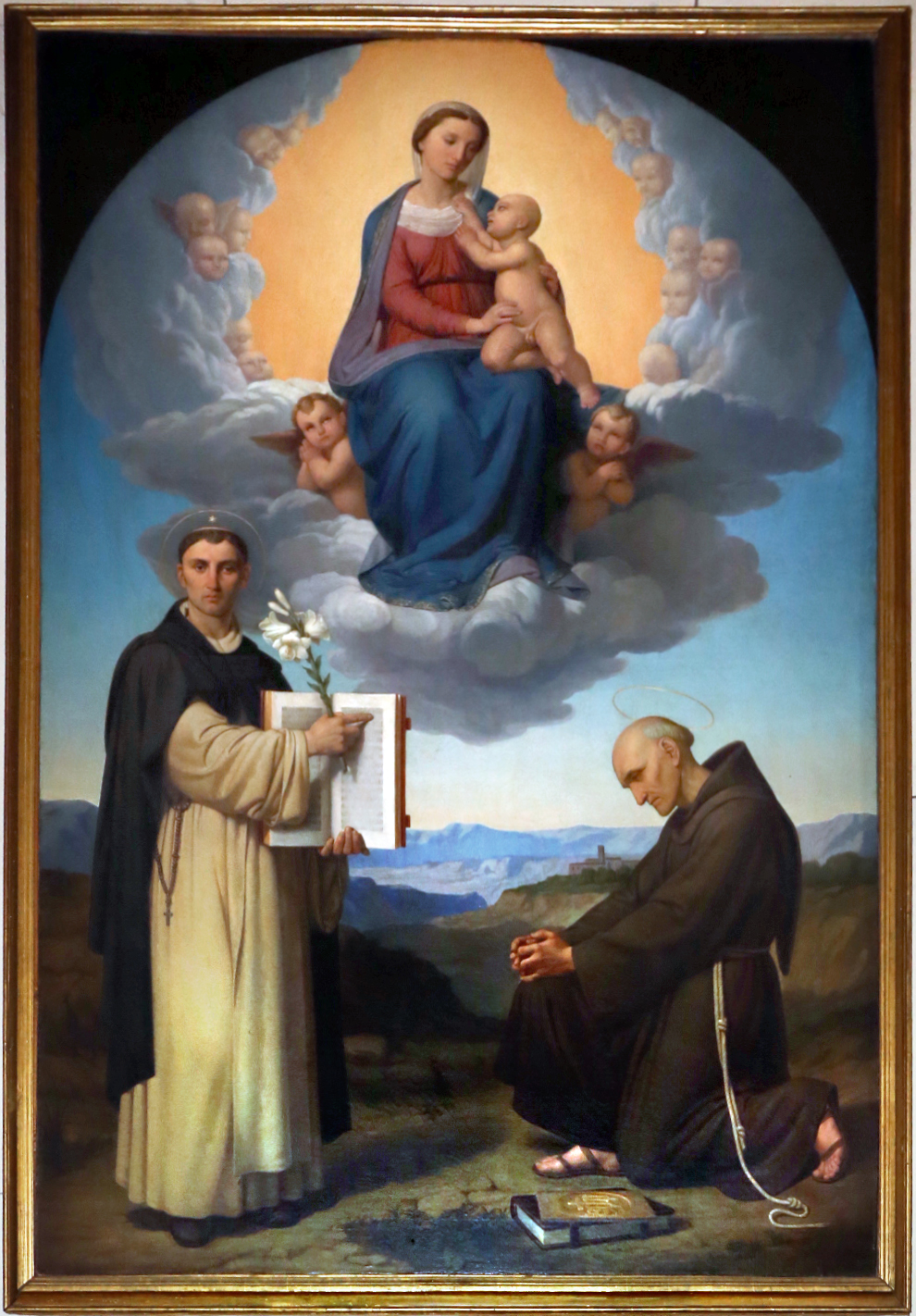
Madonna and Child with Saints Dominic and Bernard, 1856

Ridolfi painted the altarpiece depicting The Madonna in glory between Saints Peter and Paul for the parish church of Santi Pietro e Paolo in Mezzana. Other sacred works are found in the Collegiata di Santa Maria Assunta in Casole d'Elsa (where he painted alongside Amos Cassioli), in the decoration of the Palazzo Pubblico of Siena, and in the Museo Cassioli of Asciano.

Among his works are a Portrait of Sallustio Bandini and Santa Perpetua comforts her father.

Ridolfi died in 1900 in Siena.
