= Caggiano (surname) =

Caggiano is a surname. Notable people with the surname include:

- Antonio Caggiano (1889–1979), Argentine Roman Catholic cardinal
- Biba Caggiano (1936–2019), Italian-American cookbook author, television chef and restaurateur
- Emanuele Caggiano (1837–1905), Italian sculptor
- Fedele Caggiano (1804–1880), Italian sculptor
- Frank Caggiano (born 1959), American Roman Catholic bishop
- Jeremías Caggiano (born 1983), Argentine football striker
- Pasquale Caggiano (1909–1972), American politician
- Rob Caggiano (born 1976), American guitarist and producer
