= Camagni =

Camagni is a surname. Notable people with the surname include:

- Giulio Camagni (born 1973), Italian comic book illustrator and painter
- Jacopo Camagni (1977–2026), Italian illustrator and comic artist
