= Mussini =

Mussini is an Italian surname. Notable people with the surname include:

- Augusto Mussini (1870–1918), Italian painter and friar
- Cesare Mussini (1804–1879), German-Italian painter
- Federico Mussini (born 1996), Italian basketball player
- Luigi Mussini (1813–1888), Italian painter
