= Michele Gordigiani =

Italian painter (1835–1909)

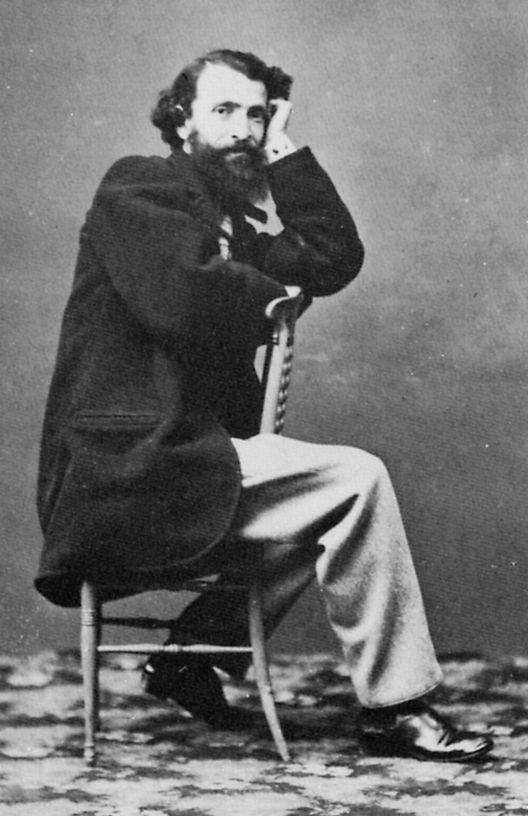
Photograph of Gordigiani by Fratelli Alinari

Michele Gordigiani (29 May 1835 – 7 October 1909) was an Italian painter, known best for his portraits.

== Biography ==
Gordigiani was born in Florence, the son of Luigi Gordigiani, a famous Florentine musician. He first studied at the Florentine Academy under Giuseppe Bezzuoli, then Luigi Norcini and Silvestro Lega; he also worked in the studio of Luigi Mussini and Franz Adolf von Stürler. In 1855, he frequented the Caffè Michelangiolo along with his brother Anatolio, where he met many of the Macchiaioli painters. He painted a portrait of the Piedmontese painter, Ludovico Raymond, who also spent time at the Caffè.

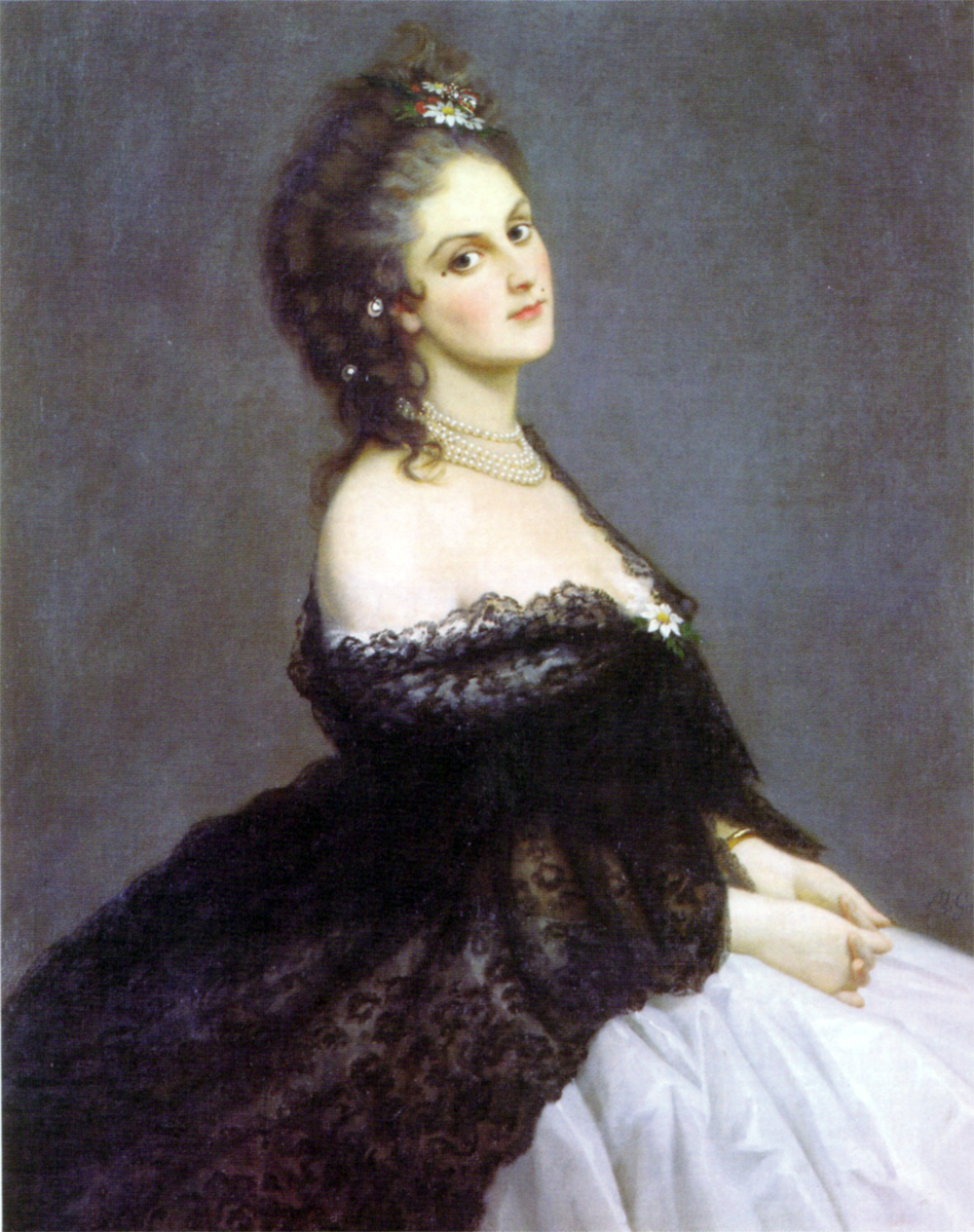
Virginia Oldoini, Countess of Castiglione (1862) by Gordigiani

He was invited to Paris in 1860 by his friend, Virginia Oldoini, the Countess of Castiglione. He was in much demand as a portrait painter, and among his subjects were King Vittorio Emanuele II, his daughter-in-law Queen Margherita, and the Count of Cavour. In 1867 in London, he painted portraits of Queen Victoria, and her consort, Prince Albert.

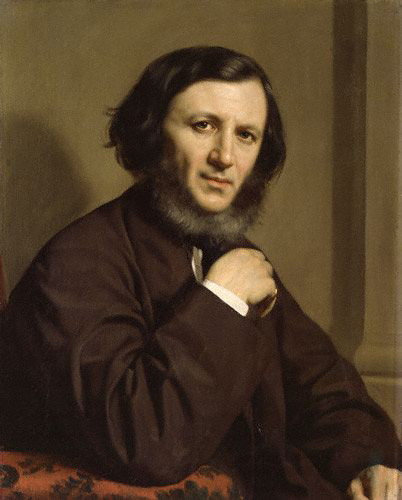
Robert Browning (1858) by Gordigiani

He also painted portraits (1898–1899) of Elizabeth and her husband Robert Browning, now in the National Portrait Gallery. In London, he participated at the exhibition of the Royal Society of Arts.

Due to his friendship with Luigi Mussini, he was a member of the commission for the triennial contest for painting at the Sienese institute of Art. In this period, his colleagues and friends included the writers and intellectuals Andrea Maffei, Edmondo De Amicis, and Enrico Nencioni.

He also painted costume genre subjects, as well as mythology, and small landscapes. His genre scenes did not prove commercially successful. In 1896 he sent works to the Florentine Exhibition of Art and Flowers and at the Second Venice Biennale. In 1909 moved to America, where he continued to work as a portrait artist.

Among his pupils were Fosco Tricca, Francesca Magliani, Pompeo Massani, and Alfredo Müller.

Gordigiani died in Florence. He was buried at the Cimitero delle Porte Sante.

== Gallery ==
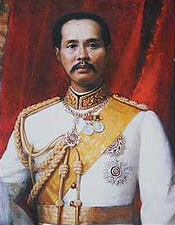
King Chulalongkorn of Siam (1898)

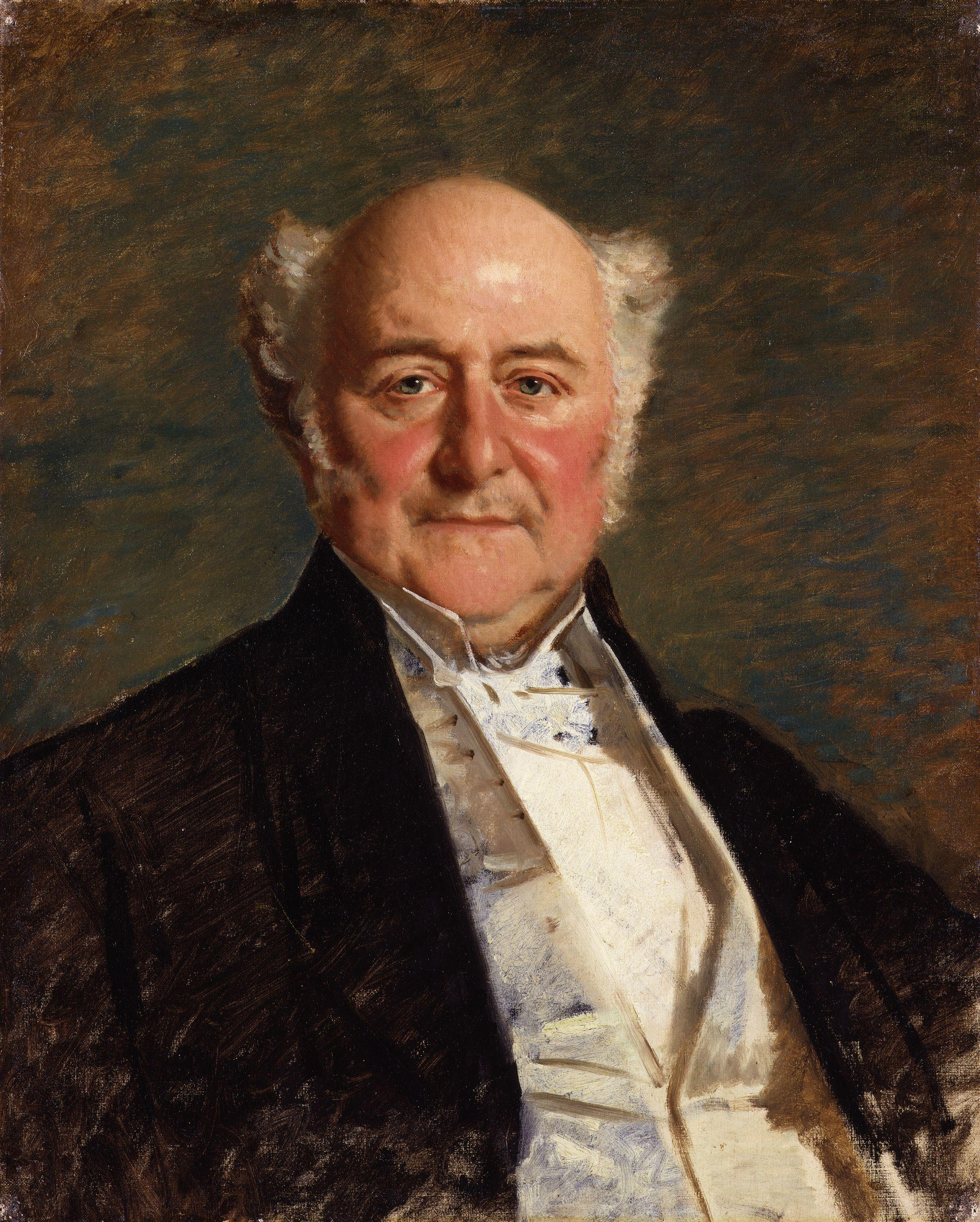
Portrait of Richard Bethell, 1st Baron Westbury

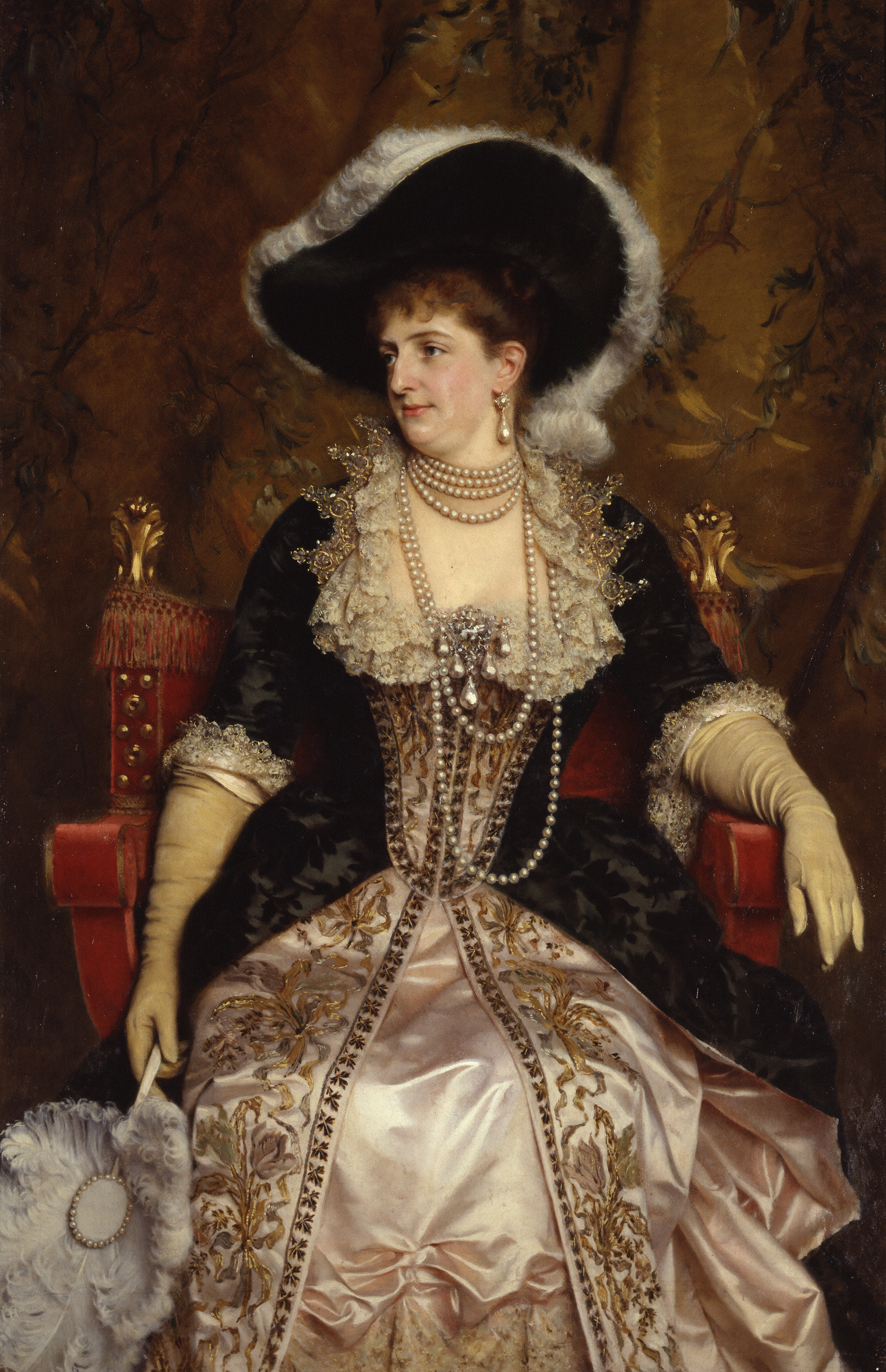
Queen Margherita of Savoy

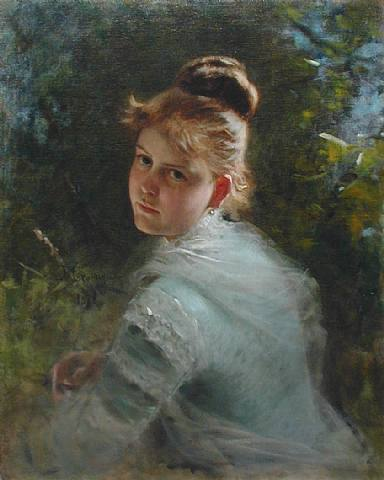
Portrait of
Sarah Choate Sears
