= Alex Kanevsky =

American painter

- Born: 1963 (age 62–63); Rostov-na-Donu, RSFSR, Soviet Union
- Education: Pennsylvania Academy of the Fine Arts
- Known for: Painting

Alex Kanevsky (born 1963) is a painter currently based in New Hampshire. His works combine abstraction and figuration in multilayered portraits that capture movement and the constant flow of time, resisting adherence to a single moment. Kanevsky's work is rooted in the artistic traditions of Eastern Europe, where he grew up, and the United States, where he now lives.

== Early life and education ==
Alex Kanevsky was born in Rostov-on-Don in Russia in 1963. Although he did not come from an artistic family, Kanevsky's parents owned a large collection of art books that were formative to his early introduction to art. Around age ten, he began producing paintings, drawing inspiration from his art books. Despite his interest in the Impressionists, Kanevsky was almost exclusively exposed to Socialist Realist paintings during his childhood. The artist recalls these works as being “the usual official drivel about workers and peasants engaged in heroic toil, done up in the style of the time, both bombastic and sentimental, heavy on dappled sunlight and Popeye-esque forearms.”

When Kanevsky was fifteen, his family left Russia and moved to Vilnius in Lithuania. It was here that the artist began to gain exposure to a more extensive artistic network. At the time, an expressionistic school existed in Lithuania that was unconcerned with realism or social issues. Observing this style of artwork proved to be eye opening to Kanevsky and he realized “that paintings could find the reason for their existence within themselves rather than being merely a decoration of a propaganda tool.”

Initially, he studied theoretical mathematics at the Vilnius University in Lithuania. However, in 1983, Kanevsky and his family decided to leave Europe and go to the United States. Settling in Philadelphia, Pennsylvania, he began taking painting classes at the Pennsylvania Academy of the Fine Arts in 1989.

== Career ==
In 1997, Kanevsky won the Pew Fellowship in the Arts, which allowed him to paint constantly for two years. The ability to work on his art without interruption was a hugely positive influence in the artist's life. When his grant money ran out, Kanevsky decided to commit to pursuing a career as a full-time artist. Galleries eventually responded to his work, providing him with the means to rent studio space. Since that time, Kanevsky has exhibited his work throughout the United States, Canada, Italy, the United Kingdom, France and Ireland. He has had over twenty solo exhibitions and has been included in more than fifteen group shows.

From 2002-2017, Kanevsky had been an adjunct painting instructor at the Pennsylvania Academy of the Fine Arts.

Kanevsky’s paintings were featured in the 2008 film Synecdoche, New York directed by Charlie Kaufman.

In 2012, he acted as a juror for the 71st Annual Juried Exhibition at the Woodmere Art Museum, Philadelphia.

== Style and subject ==
Kanevsky's works are primarily concerned with the expression of time and movement. Taking the figure as his primary subject matter, the artist's abstracted versions of reality seek to convey his personal and particular worldview with “extreme clarity.” Exploring stillness and speed simultaneously, the artist displays a Futurist sensibility through his multilayered canvases. His compositions frequently juxtapose static, monumental objects with quick, expressive brushstrokes in order to suggest that people are defined by their motion and actions, rather than their physical place in the world.

Kanevsky's figures inhabit mysterious landscapes and ambiguous architecture that shift between the recognizable world and pure form and color. Nudes feature prominently in his oeuvre and are often depicted bathing, lying on beds or floors, or boldly facing the viewer. His paintings, despite having titles, do not usually have a linear narrative. Rather, the titles function as tools, “mostly to accomplish certain precise emotional climates [rather] than to tell a story.”

Kanevsky feels a deep connection to art history, especially to the masters of portraiture Rembrandt and Velázquez. His own artistic influences are wide-ranging, including objects, artists, writers, and thinkers. The influence of post-war figural painters such as Lucian Freud and Francis Bacon is evident in the artist's fleshy, abstracted figures. Meanwhile, the roots of Kanevsky's color can be found in the works of Vincent van Gogh, Georges Seurat, and Richard Diebenkorn, among others. Aside from admiring the paintings of American and European masters, the artist draws inspiration from the work of literary greats, such as Leo Tolstoy, James Joyce, Wallace Stevens, and Ezra Pound.

== Technique ==
Kanevsky describes himself as a slow painter who must operate quickly to maintain a fresh approach to his work. Generally, he paints directly on birch plywood or stretched linen with various types of oil paint – Guerra, Mussini, Holbein, Rembrandt, Classic (Triangle Coatings) – and uses Liquin as a medium. The merging of figuration and abstraction in his artworks is the result of the process of erasure that Kanevsky employs. This technique of painting, rubbing out, and painting over results in a series of layers through which past iterations and experimentations are visible to the viewer.

Kanevsky paints both from life and photographs, with a preference for working with live models due to the importance of movement in his subjects. He often works with the same models for years, developing over time a strong sense of their individual form and motion. Alternatively, photography enables the artist explore fleeting situations, unintended artifacts, and imperfections.

== Sources ==
- McCann, Margaret. “Refiguring History Painting: Representation Meets Modern Techniques.” In The Figure: Painting, Drawing, and Sculpture – Contemporary Perspectives, edited by Margaret McCann. New York: SkiraRizzoli. 2013.
