= Angelo Visconti =

Italian painter (1829–1861)

Angelo Viscónti (1829–1861) was an Italian painter, mainly depicting turbulent scenes including historic and sacred subjects.

He was born in Siena and trained under Luigi Mussini. In 1854-1855, he won a traveling stipend along with Amos Cassioli. He moved to live with Cassioli in Rome in 1858. He suffered an epileptic convulsion while in the Tiber River in Rome, and drowned.

Some of his last works, including the large canvases of Massacre of the Innocents and The Captive Levite are on display at the Museo Cassioli in Asciano.
