= Alessandro Franchi (painter) =

Italian painter

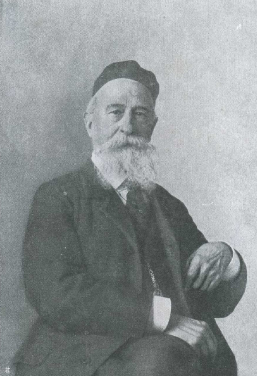
Alessandro Franchi (c.1900)

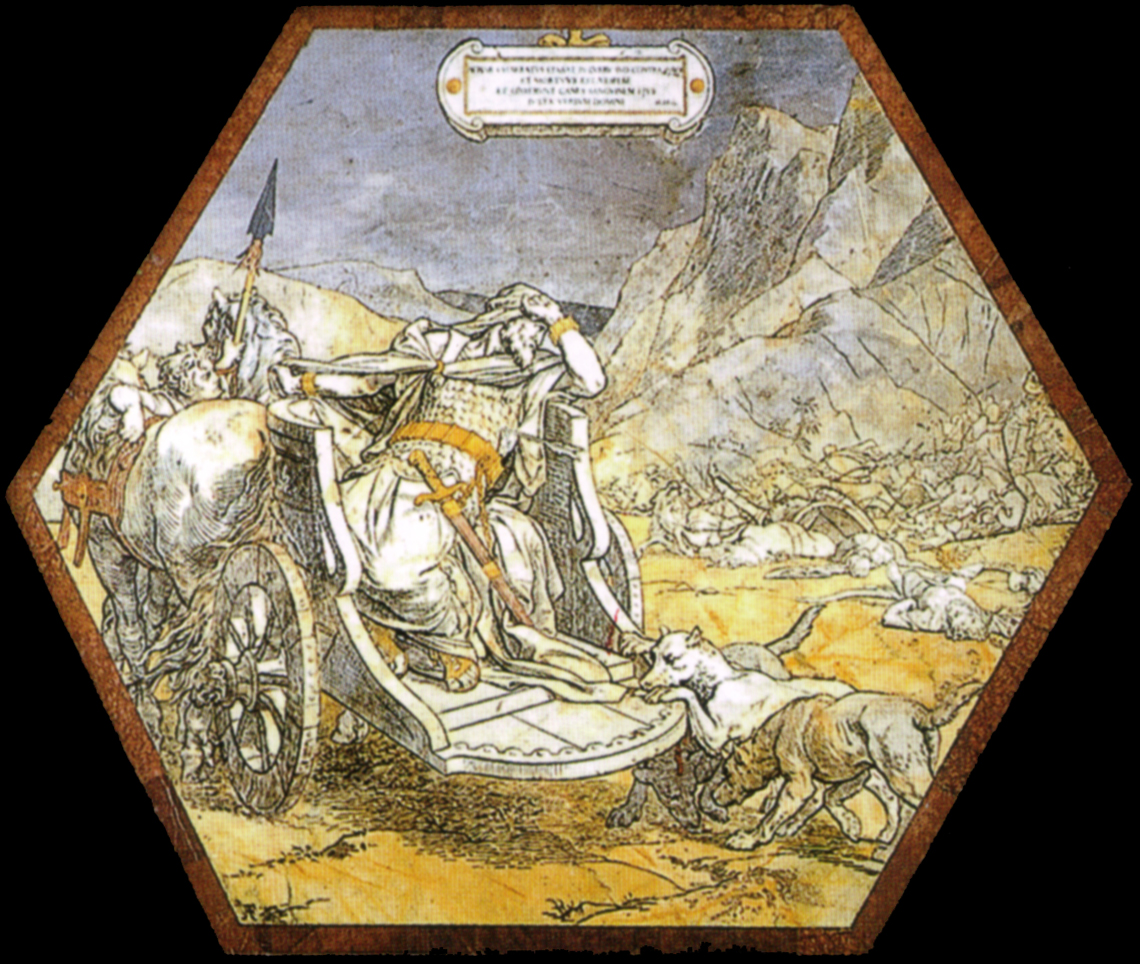
The Death of Ahab (paving stone at Siena Cathedral)

Alessandro Franchi (15 March 1838 – 29 April 1914) was an Italian painter. He worked in a combination of Romantic and Neo-gothic styles, influenced by Purismo.

== Biography ==
He was born in Prato. While still very young, he demonstrated his artistic abilities by copying religious works and making sketches of people in ceremonial costumes worn during processions. His drawing master asked him to reproduce an image of Saint Anthony made by Fra Filippo Lippi in 1498. Based on this, he was able to obtain a scholarship.

His formal studies began at a local school in Prato, operated by Alessandro Ferrarini (1815–1904). He then became a pupil of Luigi Mussini at the "Accademia Senese di Belle Arti", where he would later be a teacher and, in 1888, be promoted to a professorship, replacing Mussini. In 1893, after being a widower for ten years, he married Mussini's daughter, Luisa (1865–1925), who was a sculptor, and she became his assistant.

His first major commission was for Enrico Bindi, a writer and scholar who became Archbishop of Siena in 1871. He painted his first large-scale fresco at the Villa Guasti (belonging to the writer Cesare Guasti, a major patron) in 1864. He was active throughout the provinces of Prato, Siena and Liguria.

Most of his works are on religious themes. Notably at Siena Cathedral, where he created marble inlay paving stones for the floor of the cathedral, to replace damaged ones that had originally been made by Domenico Beccafumi. These stones were part of a project that had begun in the 14th century. It was completed by the end of the 16th century, but restoration and replacement work continued long after. His depiction of the death of Ahab was one of the last stones laid in 1878. The floor is now kept covered and shown only once a year, generally for a few weeks in September.

In addition to his paintings and restoration work, he wrote articles on art for various French and Italian magazines. He was also an active member of the provincial committee devoted to the preservation of monuments and paintings.

Franchi died in Siena on 29 April 1914. He was buried in a tomb that was designed by his wife, Luisa, and contains several of his works. A room in the Palazzo Pretorio was dedicated to his memory and contains works he donated to the city in 1911.
