= Giulio Camagni =

Italian painter

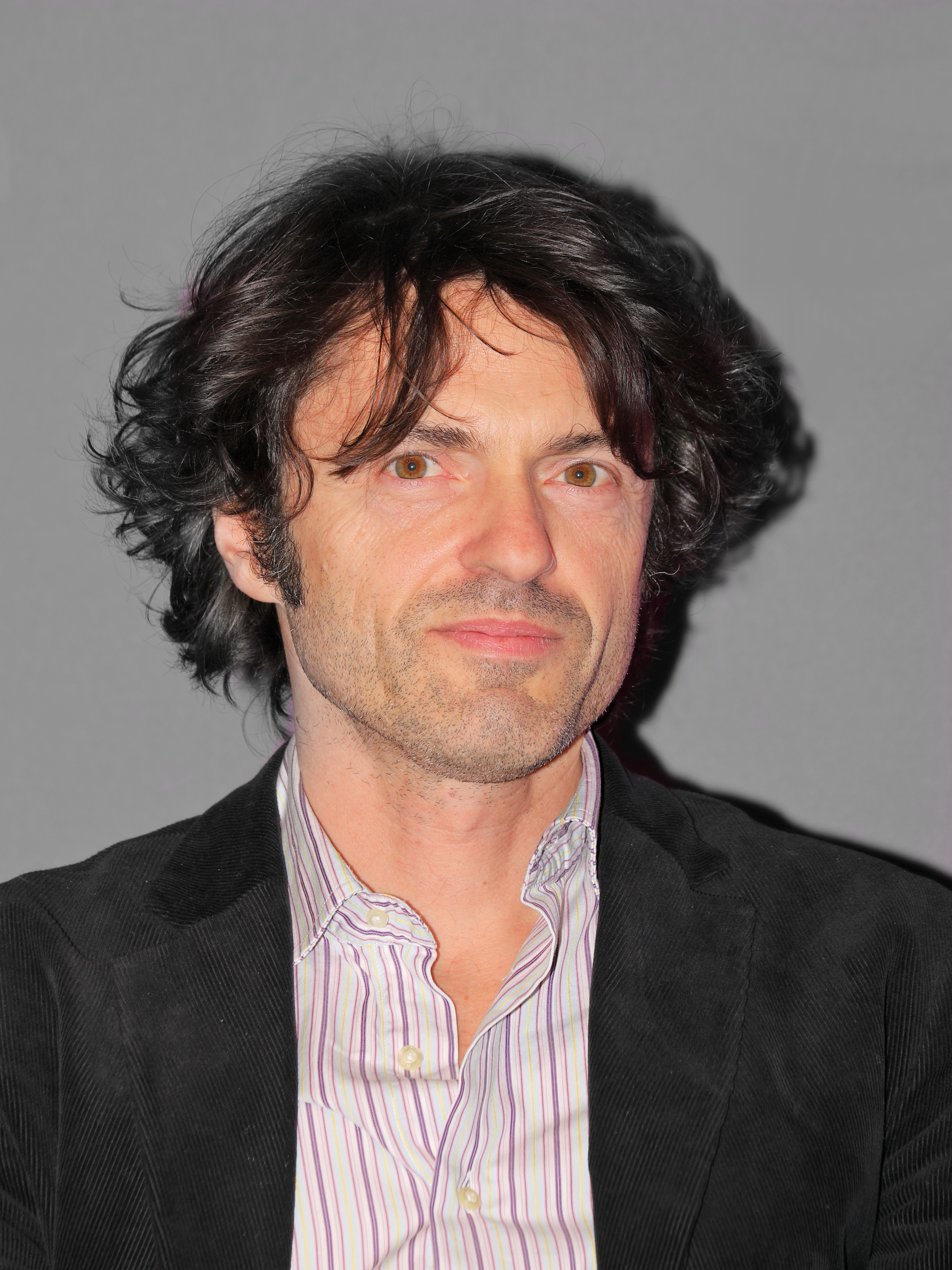
- Born: 25 March 1973 (age 53); Udine
- Education: University of Milan
- Known for: Comic books, painting, sculpting
- Website: giuliocamagni.com

Giulio Camagni (born 25 March 1973 in Udine) is an Italian comic book illustrator and painter.

== Professional career ==
As early as 17 he published his very first comic book for the series Supereroica, the Italian version of the British comic Commando. Since 1997, he has been working for Sergio Bonelli Editore, one of the most important and influential publishing houses for comics in Italy, based in Milan. In this activity, his artistic guide and supervisor has always been Carlo Ambrosini, one of the most famous Italian comic book authors who already worked for such company. In 1997, Giulio Camagni started working at the new comic Napoleone authoring the third issue of the series. At that time he was still attending a degree in Modern History at the University of Milan, from where he later graduated with the result of 110/110 cum laude. Over the years, he illustrated several others comics for the same publisher, such as Dylan Dog, Martin Mystère and Jan Dix.

His latest works are two graphic novels published in German and set during the Renaissance, both based on his own historical research: Der Kaiser, about the life of Emperor Maximilian I of Habsburg, and 1525. Der Aufstand, about the German Peasants' War.

In parallel, he has started a career as a painter, influenced by the Italian Tachisme and Art Informel. His works are permanently exhibited at the Ditesheim & Maffei Gallerie of Neuchâtel, Switzerland, at the Artmark Galerie of Vienna and previously at the Galleria Claudia Gian Ferrari of Milan until the premature death of the owner.

The galleries he works with organised several exhibitions of his paintings, drawings and sculptures at events like Art Paris, Grand Palais, Paris (2014), Artgenève, Genève (2013, 2014), the Vienna Fair (2007–2010), Arte Fiera, Bologna (2006–2009) and MiArt, Milan (2005–2007).

== Personal life ==
He was born in Udine but was raised in Milan. There, he attended the Liceo Artistico Umberto Boccioni (High School for Fine Arts) and later the University of Milan. Afterwards, he moved to Florence and then to Salzburg, to attend a course at the Internationale Sommerakademie für Bildende Kunst, taught by Eva Wagner. Eventually, he moved to Vienna where he currently lives.
