= Pompeo Massani =

Italian painter (1850–1920)

Pompeo Massani (Florence, December, 1850 – 1920) was an Italian painter who mainly depicted costume genre subjects, often in satirical poses.

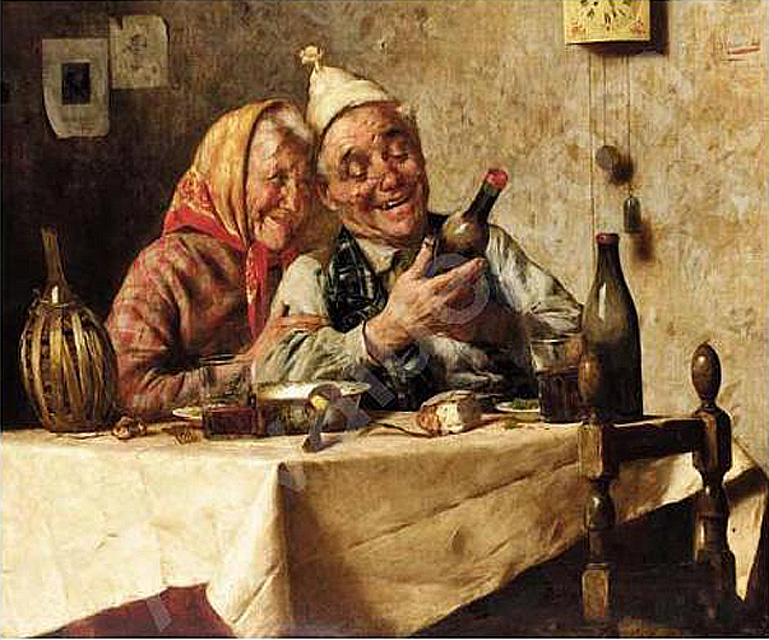
The Wine Merchant and his wife

== Biography ==
He studied at the Academy of Fine Arts of Florence, then studied for three years under Michele Gordigiani. His first important work was the painting: La politica in canonica, awarded a silver medal at the Exhibition of Rovigo of 1879. In 1881 he won the first prize at the Exhibition of Genoa, for the painting: Un brindisi al frate, depicting over 36 figures; The Design Lesson, owned by the Goupil Gallery, and I vecchi celibi; Una partila a carie; Il concerto; In cantina; and Il saluto al gobbo. The made portraits of King Vittorio Emanuele and of the Countess of Mirafiore.

Massani painted on tambourines, depicting lively public scenes, including Al teatro delle Marionette, Al circo equestre; Al teatrino; Il giocoliere, e Momento allegro. At the Exhibition of Monaco of 1889, he displayed il Circo equestre. La poesia is a canvas with five figures titled: La politica, che sta per terminare.

Massani was named honorary professor of the Royal Academy of Fine Arts of Florence. In 1887, he was awarded Cross of the Knight of the Order of the Crown of Italy.

He often painted elderly individuals engaged in apparent buffoonery or celebrating inebriation.

== Gallery ==
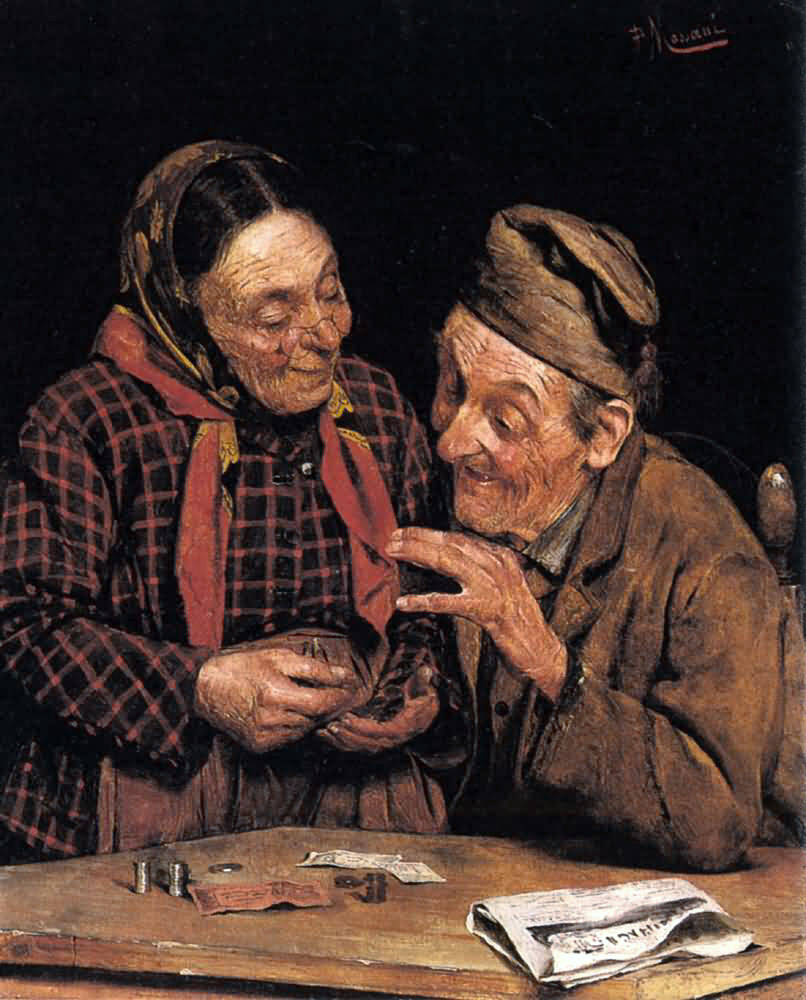
The Money counter

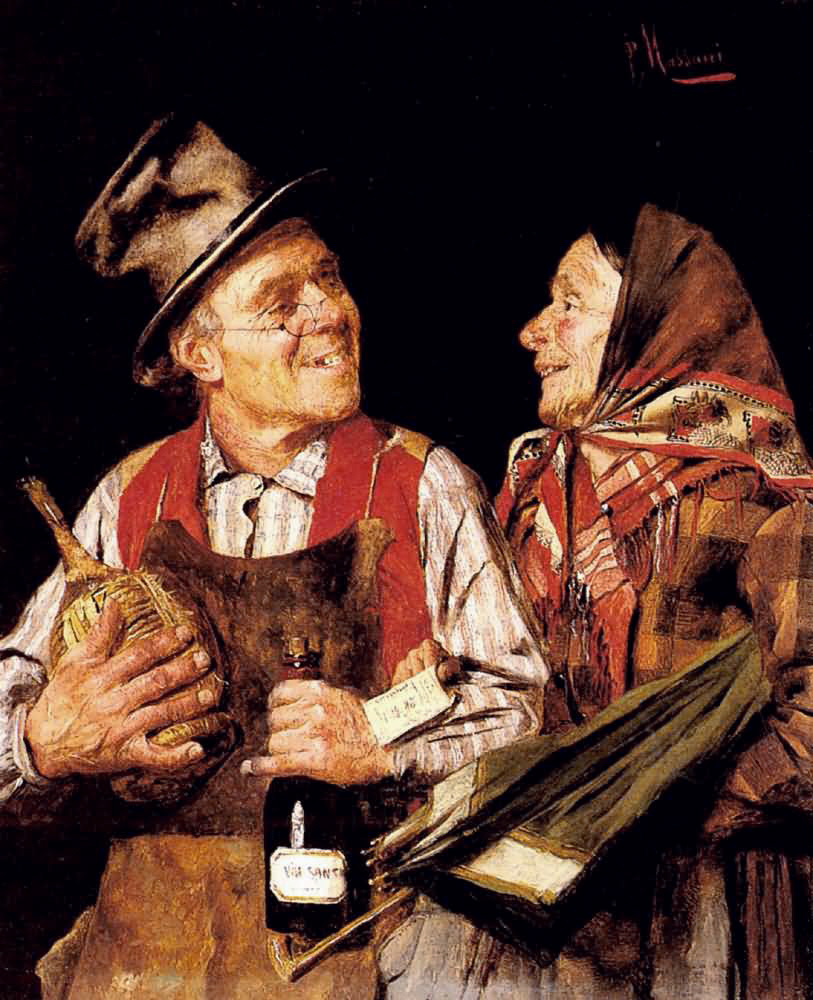
Wine merchant

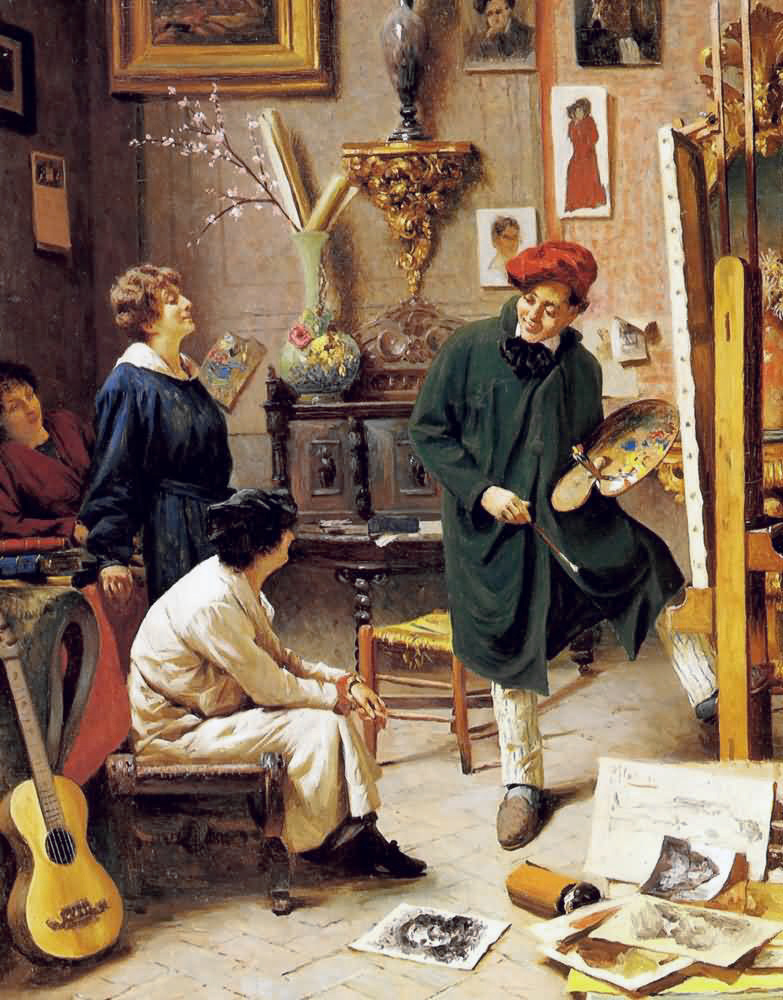
The artist's studio
