= Saint Napoleon =

Saint and festival in the French Empires

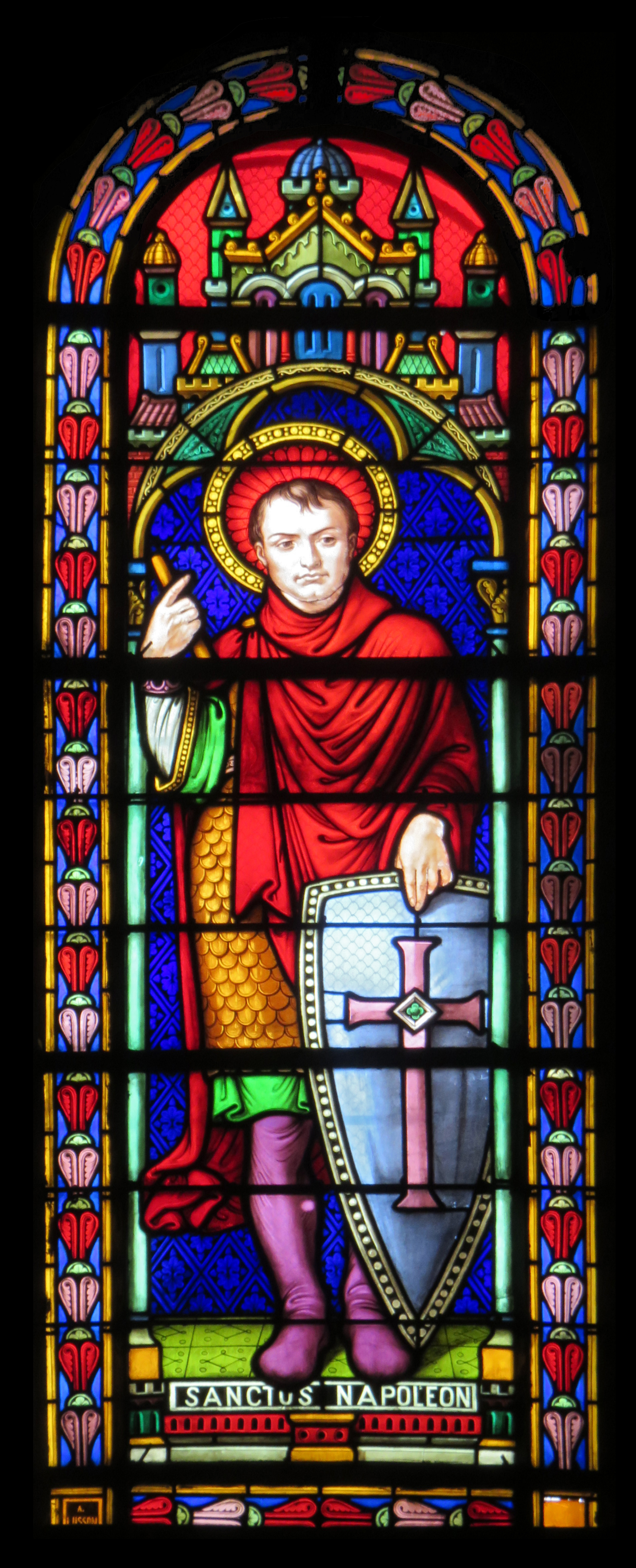
Stained glass depicting Napoleon I as Saint Napoleon in the Church of Saint-Louis, Vichy

Saint Napoleon (French: Saint-Napoléon; Italian: San Napoleone) was the name given under Napoleon I to a supposed Christian martyr adopted as the emperor's patron saint. His feast was established on 15 August, Napoleon's birthday, and became an official celebration of the First French Empire. The observance combined the emperor's birthday with the Catholic Feast of the Assumption and commemoration of the restoration of Catholic worship following the Concordat of 1801.

The feast was instituted before churchmen had established which historical saint, if any, the name Napoleon referred to. After unsuccessful searches of hagiographical sources, the cult was associated with Neopolus or Neopolis, an obscure figure appearing in medieval martyrologies, associated with 2 May. A newly composed hagiographical lesson asserted that Neopolus had developed in medieval Italian usage into Napoleo and then Napoleone.

The Bollandist scholar Hippolyte Delehaye later concluded that the identification resulted from a corruption of the martyrological tradition and that Neopolus may never have existed. The cult nevertheless developed its own liturgy, imagery, and traditions. Under the Second French Empire, 15 August was restored as a national festival, while artistic representations increasingly assimilated the supposed martyr to Napoleon I himself.

== Background ==
The personal name Napoleone existed in Italy before Napoleon Bonaparte, but there was no established saint of that name. When the young Napoleon was confirmed, Benedetto Andrea Doria, bishop of Ajaccio, reportedly told him that he knew of no saint bearing the name. Napoleon later recalled the episode during his exile on Saint Helena, remarking that not all the saints in heaven were contained in the calendars.

The origins of the cult are unclear. Its earliest known appearance was in the Almanach National for Year XI (1802–1803), which listed Saint Napoleon on 16 August, the day after the Assumption, in place of Saint Roch. The entry supplied no account of the saint or authority for his existence. By 1805 the canons of Nice were treating the new saint as established enough to ask Napoleon's permission to dedicate an altar to him.

== Institution of the feast ==
On 4 January 1806, minister of public worship Jean-Étienne-Marie Portalis proposed regularizing the observance. Recalling the national celebration of Saint Louis under the monarchy, Portalis suggested that the Empire should likewise have a feast of Saint Napoleon. The emperor could either assign the saint a separate day or combine the feast with the Assumption, on which Napoleon had been born. Napoleon chose the latter course. On 12 February he directed that 15 August should commemorate Saint Napoleon together with his own birthday and the restoration of Catholic worship. An imperial decree of 19 February established the celebration throughout the Empire. Cardinal Giovanni Battista Caprara, papal legate in France and archbishop of Milan, sanctioned the arrangement on 3 March.

The decision encountered opposition in Rome. Cardinal Michele di Pietro argued that a saint absent from the Roman Martyrology could not displace the Assumption and regarded the intervention of the civil government in the liturgical calendar as an encroachment on ecclesiastical authority. Pope Pius VII did not challenge Caprara's decision, however, in part because doing so would have undermined French bishops seeking to maintain the post-Concordat accommodation with Napoleon.

== Search for a patron saint ==
The establishment of the feast produced an immediate difficulty: neither the bishops nor the government possessed a satisfactory account of Saint Napoleon. Ecclesiastical authorities were therefore hard-pressed to identify a saint who could plausibly bear the name. On 25 April 1806, Antoine-Eustache d'Osmond, bishop of Nancy, informed Portalis that his search had been unsuccessful; "to the shame of all the libraries of Nancy," he wrote, the relevant volumes had been searched in vain, while the Bollandists and the Roman Martyrology were silent on the saint. Étienne-André-François de Paule de Fallot de Beaumont, bishop of Ghent, likewise found nothing in the Bollandist works.

François-Joseph Hirn, bishop of Tournai and a former librarian, reached a different conclusion. He claimed to have discovered a bishop named Napoleon and, in a pastoral letter of 14 May, directed that the collect for a bishop-confessor be added to the Mass of the Assumption on 15 August. Antonio Niero notes that Hirn offered no evidence for the identification. His solution nevertheless preserved the Assumption itself, treating Saint Napoleon as a commemoration rather than replacing the Marian feast.

Caprara and his collaborators reached a different conclusion. Research in martyrologies and hagiographical collections turned up an obscure figure commemorated on 2 May, whose name appeared in variants including Neopolus, Neopolis, Neapolis, and Neapolus. Pietro Mazzucchelli of the Biblioteca Ambrosiana proposed that the emperor's name could have developed from these forms through medieval Italian pronunciation and usage. Despite advancing the connection, Mazzucchelli considered Neopolo a more defensible liturgical name because it could at least be found in the martyrological tradition.

Caprara adopted the identification. On 21 May 1806, he circulated to the bishops of the Empire a historical lesson composed by Étienne-Alexandre Bernier, which was intended for inclusion in diocesan liturgical calendars. The Lectio Sancti Napoleonis presented the figure found in the older martyrologies as Saint Napoleon and supplied him with a biography as an early Christian martyr.

== Legend and historicity ==
Ex his quibus carcer pro stadio fuit, martyrologia et veteres scriptores commendant Neopolim seu Neopolum, qui, ex more proferendi nomina medio aevo in Italia invalescente et ex recepto loquendi usu, Napoleo dictus fuit, atque italice Napoleone communiter nuncupatur.

[...]

Napoleo igitur, genere vel munere illustris [...] dire excruciatus, semivivus in carcerem tandem detrusus, ibi vulnerum acerbitate peremptus et exanguis pro Christo in pace quievit.

— Lectio S. Napoleonis, reproduced in Delehaye 1926, pp. 83–84

The new lesson placed Saint Napoleon at Alexandria during the persecution of Christians under the emperors Diocletian and Maximian. It presented him as distinguished by birth or office (genere vel munere illustris), steadfast under torture, and finally cast half-dead into prison, where he died from his wounds. Niero traces much of the narrative to earlier texts: its description of Christian suffering at Alexandria drew substantially from the account of Phileas of Thmuis preserved by Eusebius, while other wording came from the Bollandists' commentary on Saturninus and Neopolus.

The Bollandist scholar Hippolyte Delehaye found no secure basis for the identification underlying the lesson. Early recensions of the Martyrologium Hieronymianum vary considerably. For 2 May, the earliest sources record Saturninus at Alexandria, while later manuscripts add forms including Epolitis, Neopoli, and Neapoli; still later versions describe Neopolus as Saturninus's companion.

Delehaye proposed that Neapoli was not a person's name but a reference to Naples, and that the supposed companion arose from the corruption and displacement of an entry reading Neapoli, Sossi ("at Naples, [Saint] Sossius"). Niero likewise notes that the subsequent derivation of Napoleone from Neopolus is not linguistically sustainable and describes the identification as an instance of folk etymology. Delehaye consequently characterized the legend of Saint Napoleon as an artificial creation rather than an inherited hagiographical tradition.

== Liturgy and celebration under the First Empire ==
From 1806 to 1813, 15 August served as France's national day. Ceremonies were organized throughout the Empire, including in Napoleonic Italy, although they were generally modest in scale and attracted less popular enthusiasm than celebrations of French military victories. Napoleon himself was fond of the observance; in 1809 he traveled incognito to Vienne to see the illuminations for the festival.

Implementation of the cult varied between dioceses. At Tournai, the historical lesson sent by Caprara was printed in the diocesan Ordo for 1808; a proper office was also printed at Strasbourg in 1812, and the cult is attested at Mechelen during the imperial period.

The liturgical practice at Venice, which had become part of the Kingdom of Italy, is documented in detail. Saint Napoleon first appeared in the Venetian diocesan Ordo in 1808 and remained there through 1810. The feast did not replace the Assumption outright. Instead, the office of the Assumption included a ninth lesson on Saint Napoleon, while a commemoration of the martyr was made at Lauds and Mass. At Mass, the collect for Saint Napoleon was taken from the common of a non-bishop martyr and was followed by a prayer for Napoleon as ruler. The Venetian ninth lesson was a shortened adaptation of the longer text circulated through Tournai. It identified the saint as Neopolus or Napoleo, placed his martyrdom at Alexandria during the Diocletianic persecution, and described him as dying in prison together with Saturninus. The lesson cited the Bollandists as its historical authority.

The religious observance formed part of a larger civic festival. In Venice the annual celebration followed a fixed pattern during the Napoleonic period. A solemn Te Deum was sung at St Mark's Basilica and in parish churches, and in some years aboard the flagship anchored in the basin of San Marco. The ceremonies were followed by an official dinner for municipal officials and military officers, balloon ascents, a lottery drawing, evening illumination of the city, and a free, sometimes masked, ball at La Fenice or the public Ridotto. Some celebrations also included military exercises.

The specifically liturgical cult began to recede before the fall of the Empire. Saint Napoleon disappeared from the Venetian diocesan Ordo in 1811, although the Te Deum, prayers for the emperor, and other imperial observances continued until 1814. The political reversal found a more informal expression in one surviving copy of the Ordo for 1814: beside the entry for 20 May, shortly after Napoleon's first abdication, a cleric wrote in the margin, "All'Elba Napol(eone)" ("Napoleon to Elba").

The namesake of the celebration also entered non-Catholic imperial culture. During the Napoleonic period a Scottish Rite Masonic lodge in the rue Neuve-des-Petits-Champs in Paris operated under the name of Saint Napoleon, using as its emblem a radiant star surrounding a book inscribed with the lodge's name.

== Suppression, survival, and revival ==
After the Bourbon Restoration, an ordinance of Louis XVIII dated 16 July 1814 annulled the decree establishing the imperial feast and other anniversaries of the Napoleonic regime. The official observance of Saint Napoleon was consequently abolished.

The anniversary nevertheless continued to be observed by Bonapartists. Between 1815 and 1848, celebrations of 15 August were held by groups and individuals as expressions of attachment to Napoleon and, at times, of political opposition to the reigning government. In Lyon, Bonapartist prisoners at the Saint-Joseph penitentiary marked the anniversary by arranging pieces of candle in the shape of an "N" on their cell gates and lighting them; they were punished with several days of solitary confinement. Under the July Monarchy, the commune of Moulins-Engilbert regularly celebrated the Saint-Napoleon with the participation of the municipality and church, while authorities in Lille banned a workers' Saint-Napoleon society in 1841 for conspiring against the government.

Louis-Napoleon Bonaparte restored 15 August as France's national festival by decree on 16 February 1852, during the Second Republic and months before the proclamation of the Second French Empire. The measure formed part of the establishment of a distinctly Bonapartist civic order following the coup of December 1851. From 1852 through 1869, eighteen consecutive official Saint-Napoleon celebrations were held throughout France. The date also had personal associations for Louis-Napoleon, who had celebrated the Saint-Napoleon with parties and fireworks in his youth. During a celebration at Baden in 1834, he had vowed to overthrow the French monarchy and restore the Napoleonic dynasty.

The restored festival retained the conjunction of Bonapartist and Catholic symbolism, but the liturgical office of Saint Napoleon was not restored. The official program began with charity to the poor and a Te Deum attended by local authorities, followed by a military review, afternoon games and amusements, and evening fireworks or bonfires, banquets, music and public dancing. Although the format was prescribed by the central government, local political and social conditions substantially affected the character of the celebrations.

The conjunction with the Assumption could produce tensions between the religious and political observances. For the Catholic clergy, the Assumption remained the principal feast of 15 August; many clerics devoted more attention to the traditional religious celebration than to the imperial festival, and some avoided announcing the national observance from the pulpit. Legitimist opponents of the Empire faced a related difficulty, since participation in the Assumption and its church ceremonies could be difficult to separate from the official celebration of Napoleon III.

The last official Saint-Napoleon celebration was held in 1869. No celebration was held in August 1870 because of the Franco-Prussian War. Rather, communes were instead asked to hold public prayers for the emperor and the army. After the fall of the Second Empire, 15 August continued as an unofficial Bonapartist observance. Saint-Napoleon banquets were held in Paris in the 1880s and 1890s, while the anniversary continued to bring together supporters of the Napoleonic tradition in parts of southwestern France, Marseille and Corsica during the early Third Republic.

== Iconography and later legends ==
Philippe de Frondat's 1852 lithograph of Saint Napoleon, depicted with the features of Napoleon I

The cult produced a distinct iconography during the First Empire. Raffaele Argenziano identifies several early engravings in which Saint Napoleon appears as an older, bearded martyr imprisoned and chained, usually accompanied by the palm of martyrdom and instruments of torture. Other images showed him as a younger Roman soldier or officer. Argenziano suggests that depictions of Saint Napoleon as a Roman soldier were encouraged by the lesson's description of Christian martyrs as milites Christi ("soldiers of Christ"), an image that also resonated with Napoleon's own military identity.

One early print, dated by Argenziano to between 1802–1803 and 1806, shows the saint in loosely Roman dress receiving a crown from an angel and bears the date 16 August, corresponding to the saint's first appearance in the Almanach National. Another painting recorded at Piombino in 1818 showed Saint Napoleon standing while Felice Baciocchi knelt before him, an arrangement Argenziano interprets as an allusion to Napoleon's grant of the principality of Piombino to Baciocchi.

After Napoleon's death, a separate hagiographical tradition appeared in which the saint was transformed into a medieval warrior. An Abrégé de la vie de St. Napoléon, produced between Napoleon's death in 1821 and the transfer of his remains to Paris in 1840, claimed that Saint Napoleon had been born in Corsica on 15 August 1208, fought in the crusading army of Louis IX of France, was captured and imprisoned on an island in the Sea of Marmara, and died there around 1260. Argenziano describes this as a later popular legend unrelated to the earlier hagiographical tradition, and notes the obvious parallels with the life of Napoleon I.

The revival of the imperial festival after 1852 produced a new flourishing of Saint-Napoleon imagery. Some works increasingly removed the distinction between saint and emperor. A lithograph by Philippe de Frondat dated 1852 depicts the martyr under torture with the facial features of Napoleon I. A marble statue commissioned for Milan Cathedral in 1858 and completed by Abbondio Sangiorgio in 1860 likewise portrayed Saint Napoleon with Napoleon's face, dressed in an antique tunic and chained at the ankle. A solemn Mass and Te Deum were celebrated in the cathedral on 15 August 1859 for Napoleon III's name day, despite the absence of the saint from the decree that had restored the national festival in 1852.

Argenziano groups nineteenth-century representations of Saint Napoleon into three principal types: an older bearded martyr imprisoned in chains, a youthful Roman soldier, and a crusader knight.

== See also ==
- Imperial cult
- Napoleone
- Napoleonic propaganda

== Sources ==
- Argenziano, Raffaele (2001). "San Napoleone: la santità del potere ossia il potere della santità". In Ladis, Andrew; Zuraw, Shelley E. (eds.). Visions of Holiness: Art and Devotion in Renaissance Italy (in Italian). Athens, Georgia: Georgia Museum of Art, University of Georgia. pp. 213–229. ISBN 0915977400.
- Benzoni, Riccardo (2014). "Il culto di San Napoleone. Ricerche erudite nella Milano napoleonica". Giornale di storia (in Italian) (14): 1–32. ISSN 2036-4938.
- Delehaye, Hippolyte (1926). "La légende de saint Napoléon". Mélanges d'histoire offerts à Henri Pirenne par ses anciens élèves et ses amis à l'occasion de sa quarantième année d'enseignement à l'Université de Gand, 1886–1926 (in French). Vol. 1. Brussels: Vromant & Co. pp. 81–88 – via Internet Archive.
- Hazareesingh, Sudhir (2004). The Saint-Napoleon: Celebrations of Sovereignty in Nineteenth-Century France. Cambridge, Massachusetts: Harvard University Press. doi:10.2307/j.ctv1smjsnv. ISBN 9780674013414.
- Niero, Antonio (1999). "Riflessi liturgici dell'età napoleonica a Venezia: il culto di San Napoleone e sue connessioni". Ricerche di storia sociale e religiosa (in Italian) (55): 67–92. ISSN 0392-1581.
- Petit, Vincent (2012). "Religion du souverain, souverain de la religion : l'invention de saint Napoléon". Revue historique (in French) (663): 643–658. doi:10.3917/rhis.123.0643.
- Petit, Vincent (2015). "Saint Napoléon, un saint pour la nation : contribution à l'imaginaire politique français". Napoleonica. La Revue (in French) (23): 59–127. doi:10.3917/napo.023.0059.
