= Ada Mangilli =

Italian painter

Ada Mangilli (Cento, 23 September 1863 - Florence, 5 March 1935) was an Italian painter.

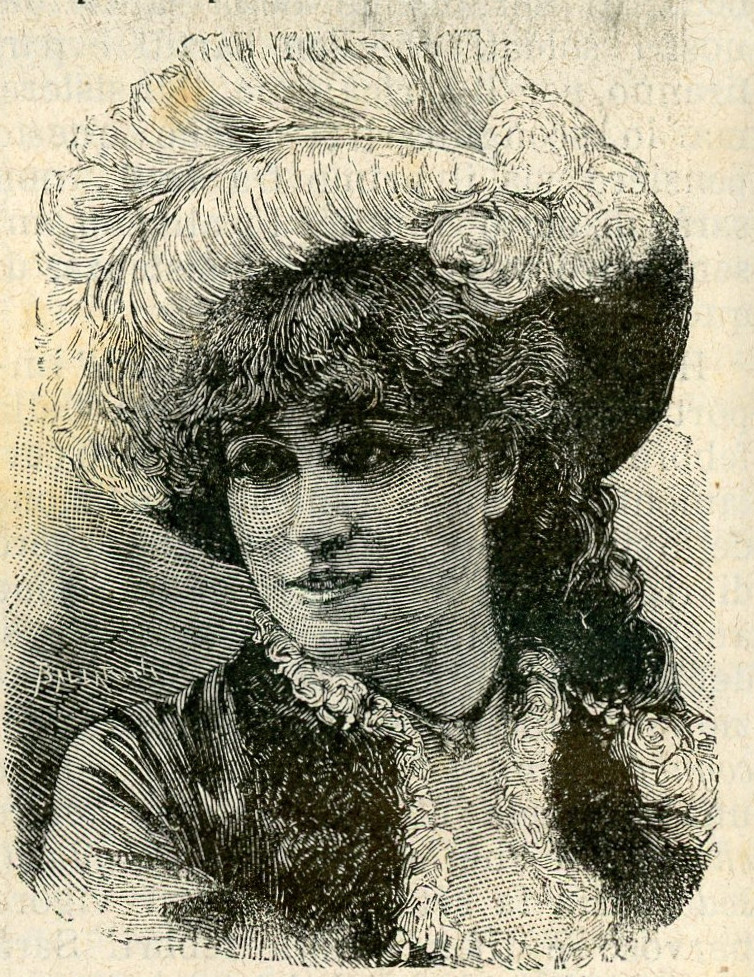
Ada Mangilli

== Biography ==
She studied under professor Amos Cassioli. She mainly painted small oil canvases, some sold in the Netherlands by the merchant signor Hohlender. She often depicted women in Neo-pompeian scenes, such as a Bacchanalian celebration, in various stages of undress.

She also painted oil models, exhibited in 1879, for two mosaics on the left door of the Cathedral of Florence, depicting the blessed Bonifazio Lupi, Marquis of Soragna, founder of a Florentine charitable institution, and Piero di Luca Borsi, a popolano during the Republic, that had established the Arch-Confraternity of the Misericordia. She also painted a Tobias for the funerary chapel of the Cemetery of Antella near Florence. She also drew illustrations for the album Florentiu.

Among her works are: Baccante (gold medal at Exhibition of Fine Arts of Ferrara, and owned by the Pinacoteca), costume medioevale and Floralia. She painted a large canvas depicting Young Agrippa, exhibited at the Mostra Italiana del 1889 in London. At the Mostra Beatrice di Lavori femminili in 1890 at Florence, she exhibited a series of life-size figures: Le tre Marie, which won the first prize, a gold medal, for painting. She married Count Francesetti di Merzenile, who was known as a supporter of the arts. She also painted a Beatrice and Jesus forgiving the Adulterer. She lived and worked at the Villa alla Querce in Florence.
