= Pietro Tenerani =

Italian sculptor (1789–1869)

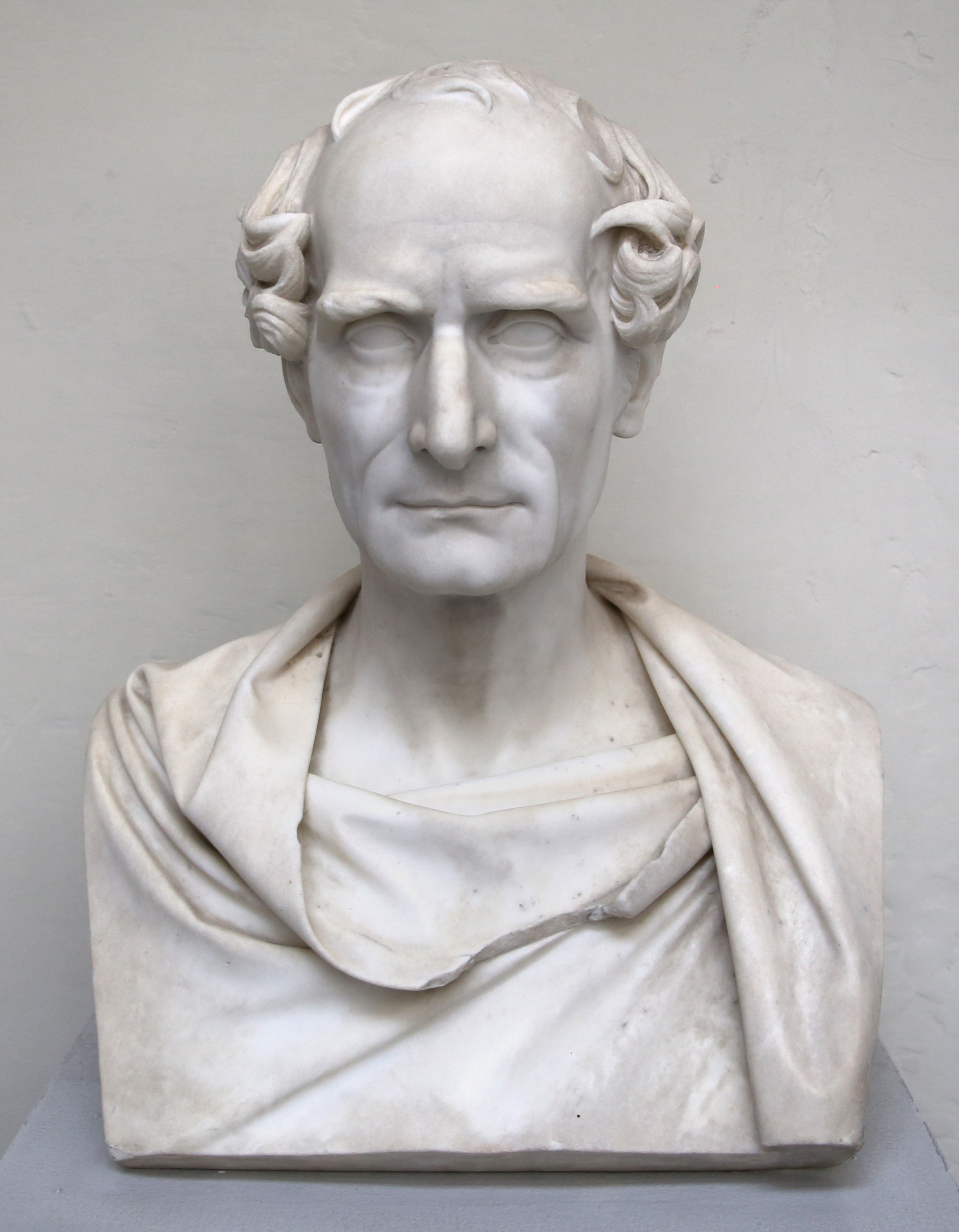
- Bust of Pietro Tenerani by Pietro Franchi (1817–1878)
- Born: 11 November 1789; Torano, Carrara, Grand Duchy of Tuscany
- Died: 16 December 1869 (aged 80); Rome, Papal States
- Known for: Sculpture
- Movement: Neoclassicism; Purismo

Signature
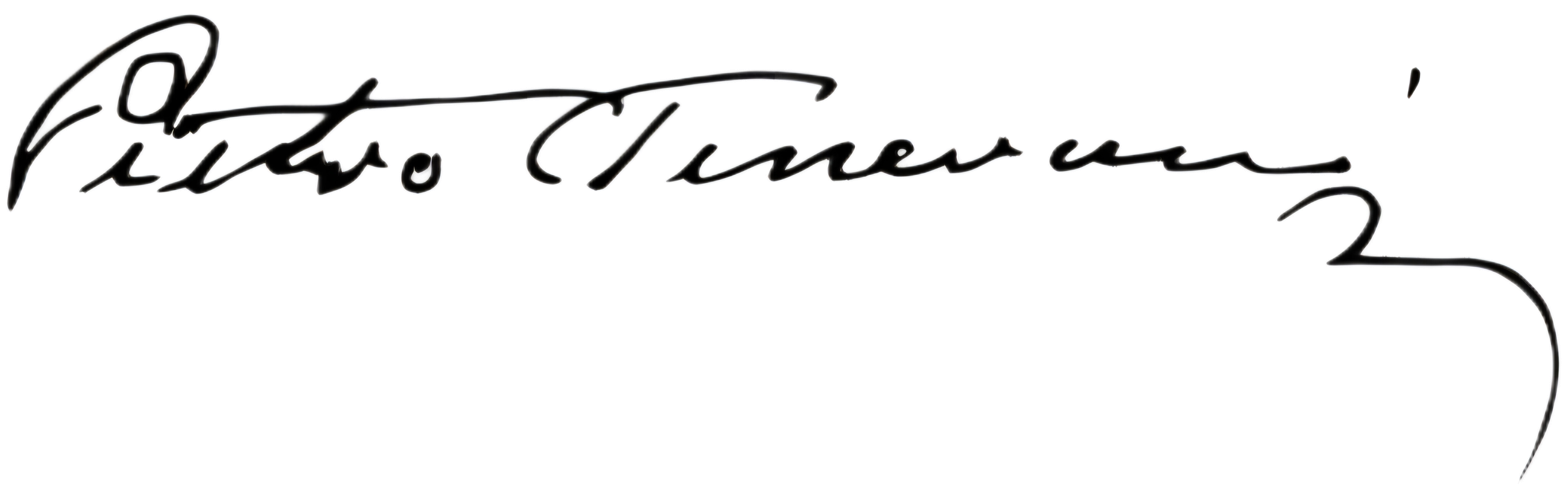

Pietro Tenerani (11 November 1789 – 16 December 1869) was an Italian sculptor of the Neoclassic style.

== Biography ==
=== Early career ===
Pietro Tenerani was born in Torano, near Carrara. He initially trained with his maternal uncle, the sculptor Pietro Marchetti, and in 1813, obtained a stipend to study in Rome. There he studied mainly in the studio of Bertel Thorvaldsen. In 1816, he sculpted an Abandoned Psyche sold to Marchesa Lenzoni of Florence. The work reveals an adherence to the tenets of Purismo and, in the subsequent copies executed for eminent patrons, albeit with minor variations, a gradual tendency towards sentimental narrative emerged. After this proof of maturity, his sculptures became more original as he gradually freed himself from Thorvaldsen’s influence. At this time he also sculpted Faun Playing the Tibia, Psyche in a Faint and the marble group Cupid Removing a Thorn from Venus’ Foot (1822), of which several copies were made for such patrons as Nikolaus II, Prince Esterházy, William Cavendish, 6th Duke of Devonshire, William I of Württemberg and Nicholas I of Russia.

At the same time he further consolidated his reputation with the execution of his first low reliefs and marble sculptures of a funerary nature, such as the funerary monument to Clelia Severini (1823, Rome, San Lorenzo in Lucina) and Eudorus and Cimodoce Condemned to Death in the Flavian Amphitheatre (1824; Saint-Malo, Château). In 1824 he executed a marble portrait of Bertel Thorvaldsen (Rome, Accademia Nazionale di San Luca), although he had a serious altercation with him over a joint commission from Amalie Auguste of Bavaria that terminated their relationship. During the 1830s Tenerani undertook various major commissions in which he used Classical subjects to extol Christian and civil virtues (e.g. the funerary monument to the Marchioness of Northampton, 1833; Castle Ashby, Northants). In 1836 he sculpted a St John the Evangelist for the church of San Francesco di Paola in Naples, and completed a colossal statue of Alphonsus Liguori for the Vatican.

=== Mature work ===
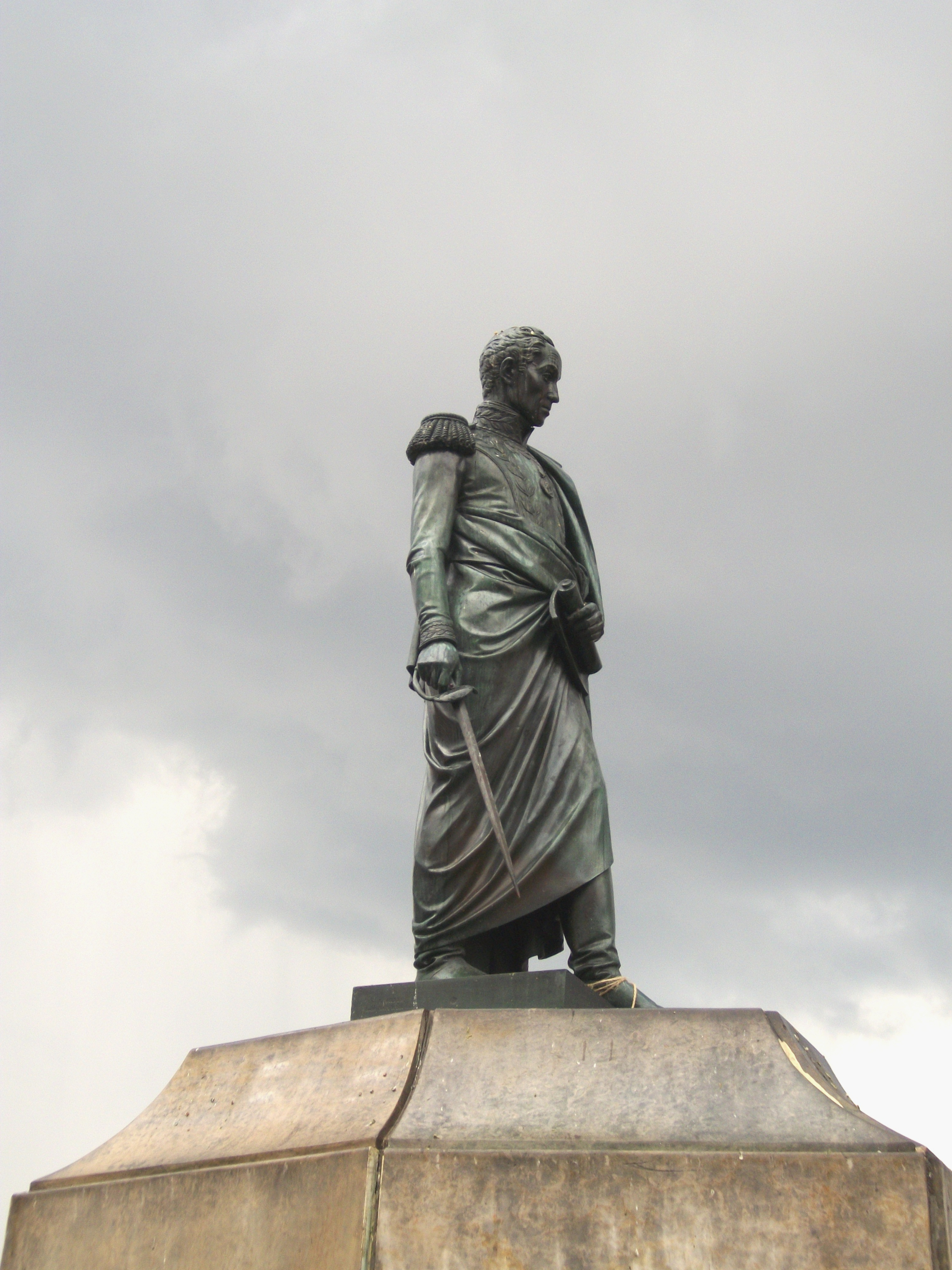
Statue of Simón Bolívar on the square Bolivar of Bogotá

After the departure of Thorvaldsen in 1838, Tenerani became the principal sculptor in Rome. He made numerous busts of officials in the state and church, including Popes Pius VIII, Gregory XVI, and Pius IX. In 1839 he completed restorations on the Lateran Sophocles. In 1842 he received the important commission for the bronze monument to Simón Bolívar (1846; Bogotá, Quinta Bolívar), reproduced in 1852 for Bolívar’s tomb in the National Pantheon of Venezuela. This work testifies to his ability to reconcile modern customs with the dignity associated with Classical dress. In 1844 he travelled to Germany and Vienna, where he was received with much admiration and acclaim. One of his last works is the seated marble statue of the statesman Pellegrino Rossi (1851; Rome, San Lorenzo in Damaso). Another late work, the monument to Pope Pius VIII (1853–66; Rome, St Peter’s), expresses ‘a certain faded and funereal naturalism’ and at the same time confirms his official recognition. In 1864 Tenerani realized the bust of the Empress of Mexico María Carlota Amelia, wife of Maximilian of Habsbourg (Rome, Museo di Roma).

In his work Tenerani broke with the aesthetic traditions of Neoclassicism in favour of closer links with Romanticism and in particular the Purismo movement, whose manifesto, Del Purismo nelle arti, he signed in 1843. He played a significant role in the art life of Rome: he was elected a member (1824) and later became President (1856) of the Accademia di San Luca, became a member (1844) of the Commissione Consultiva di Antichità a Belle Arti, and held the presidency (1858) of the Capitoline Museums and the directorship (1860) of the Musei e Gallerie Pontificie at the Vatican.

Tenerani died in Rome on 16 December 1869. He was buried in the Church of Santa Maria degli Angeli e dei Martiri. Among his pupils were Saro Zagari, Fedele Caggiano and Ambrogio Zuffi. His brother Giuseppe Tenerani (fl. 1830–60) and his son Giambattista Tenerani (fl. 1860–80) were also sculptors, and his grandson Carlo Tenerani (1845–1929) was an architect.

== Gallery ==
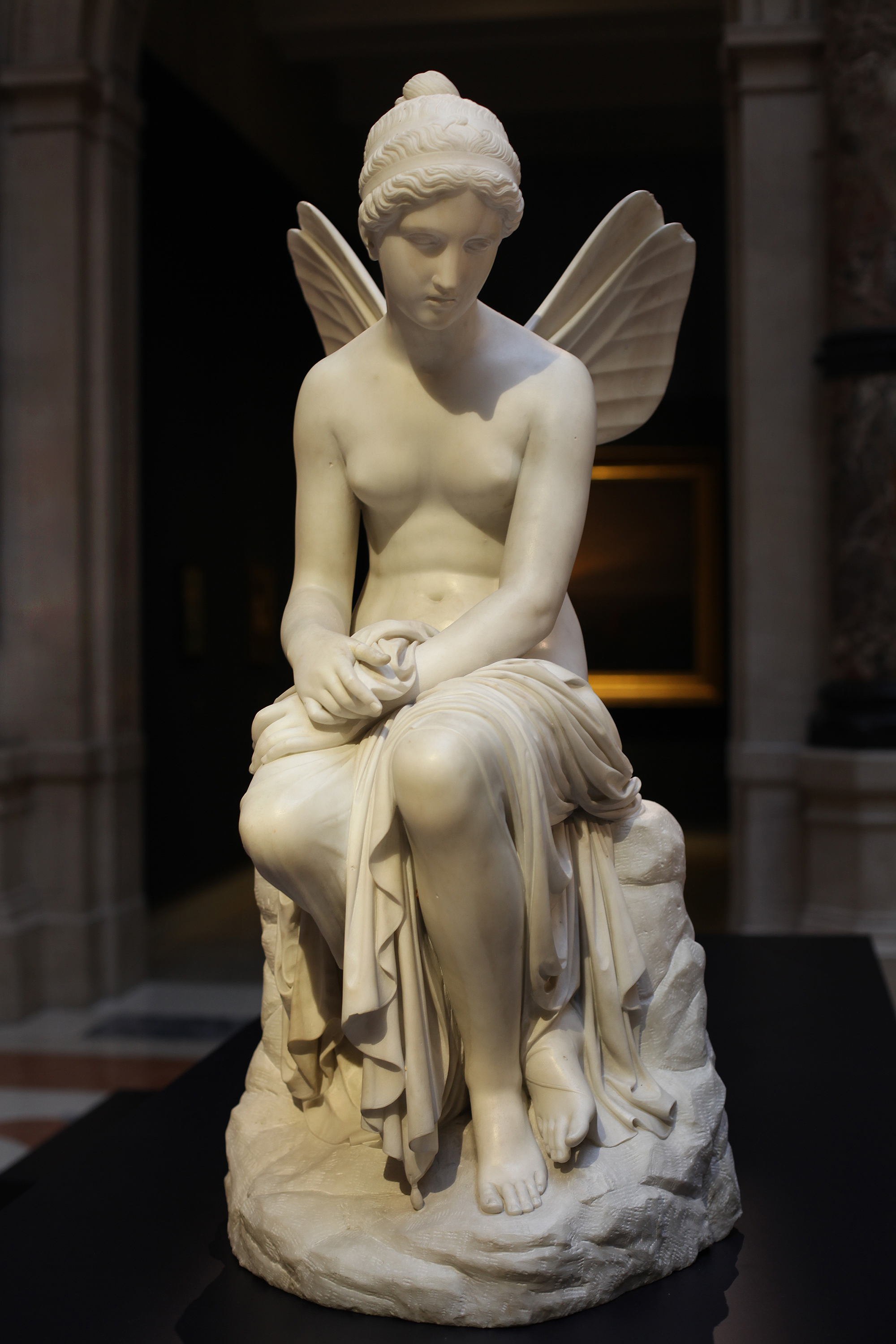
Psyche abandoned, Florence, Palazzo Pitti
1816

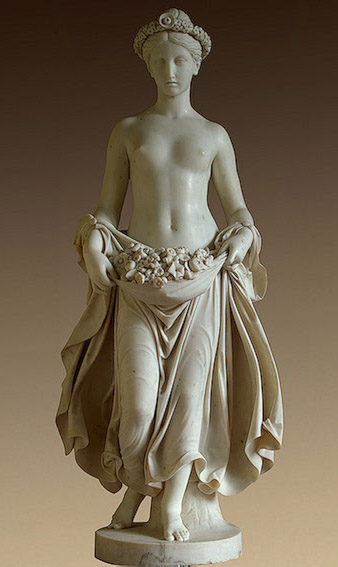
Flora, Saint Petersburg, Hermitage Museum
1840.

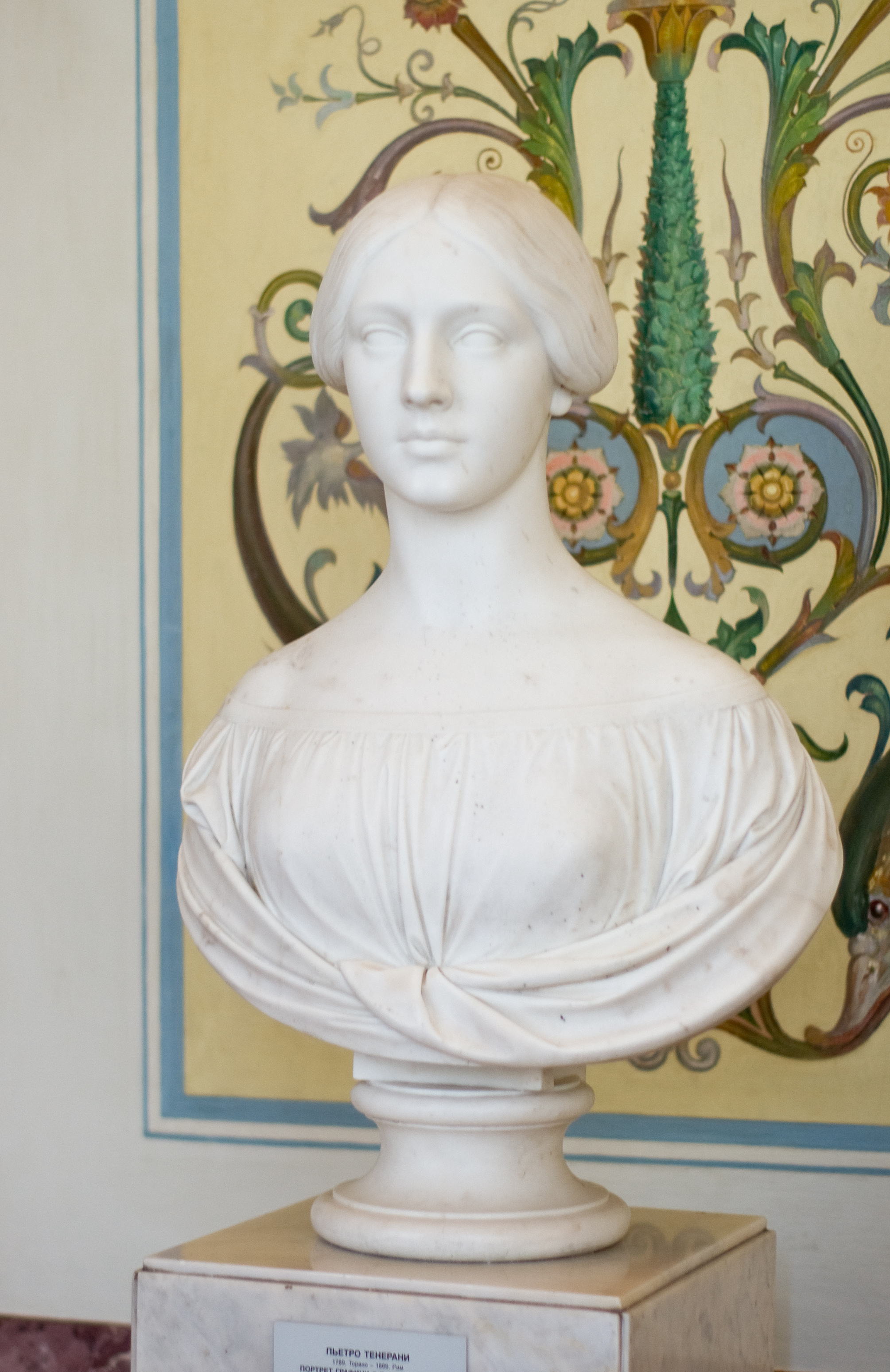
Portrait of S. Shuvalova, Saint Petersburg, Hermitage Museum.

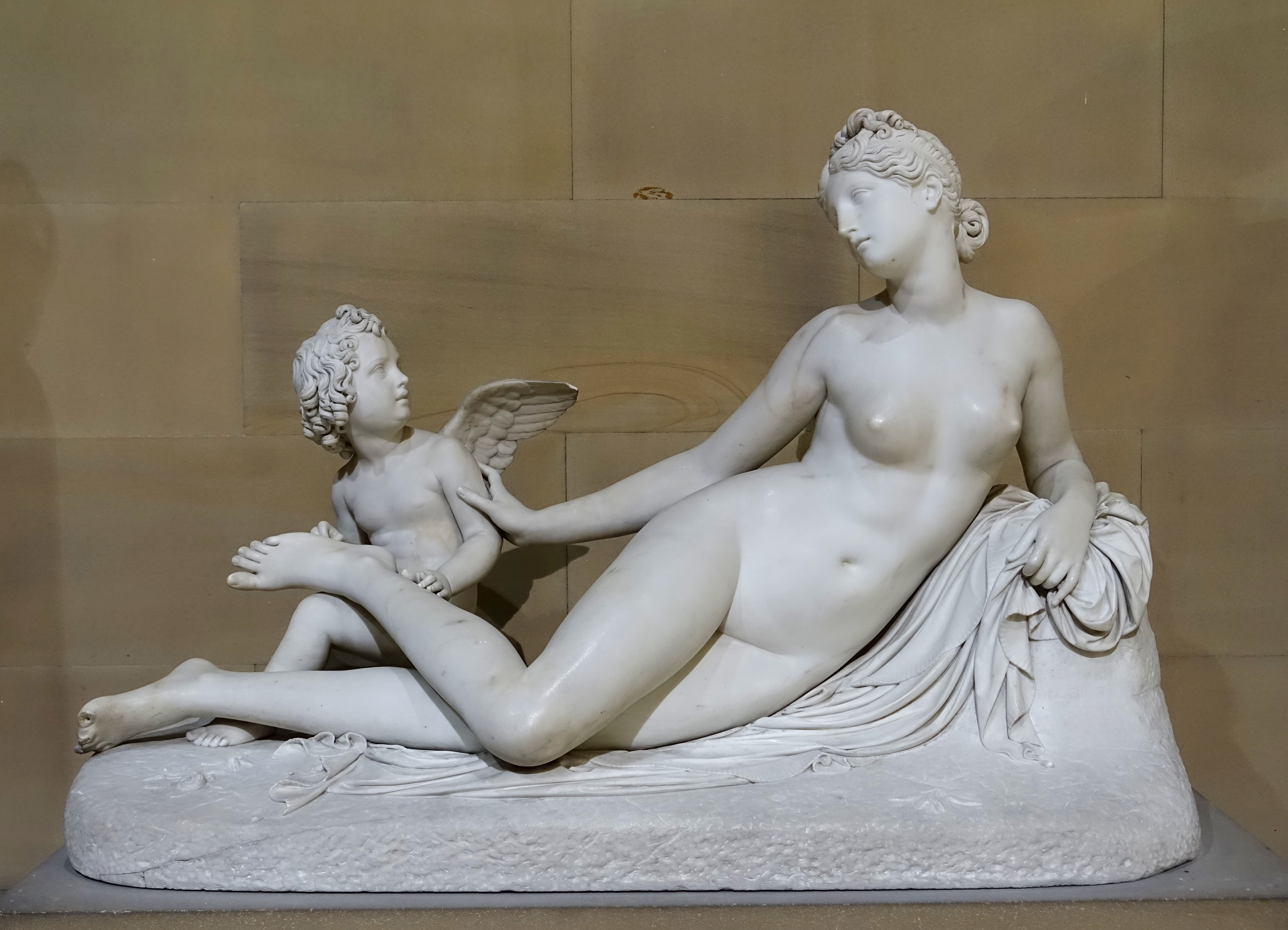
Cupid Pulling a Thorn out of the Foot of Venus, Chatsworth House, Derbyshire, England
1816

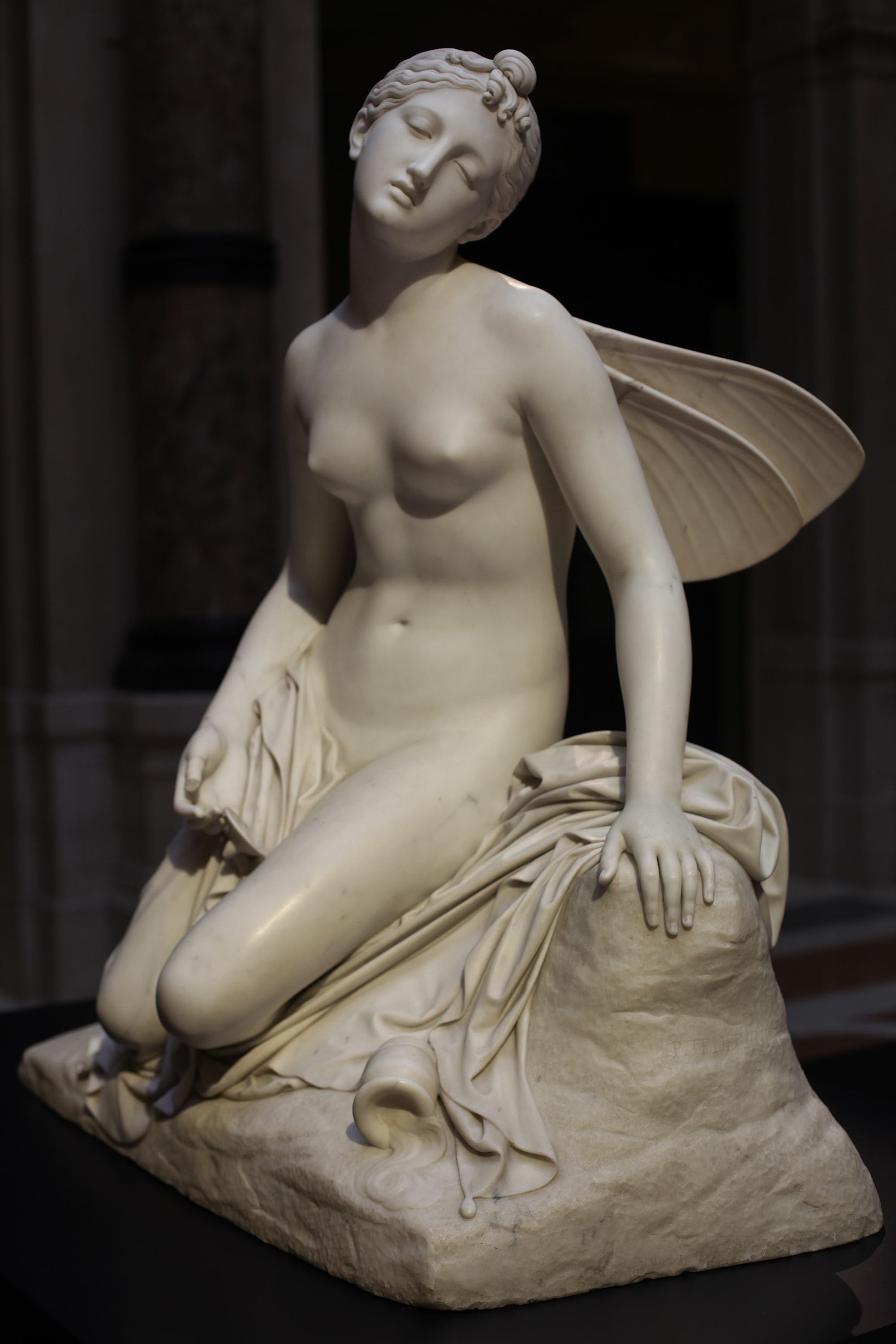
Fainted Psyche, Rome, Galleria Nazionale d'Arte Moderna
1838

Bust of Ludovico Ariosto, Modena, Museo Civico

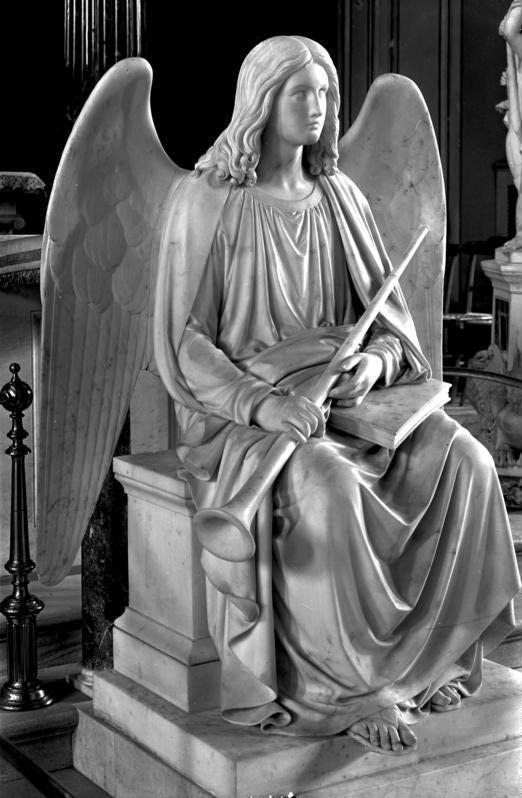
Resurrection Angel, Potsdam, Friedenskirche

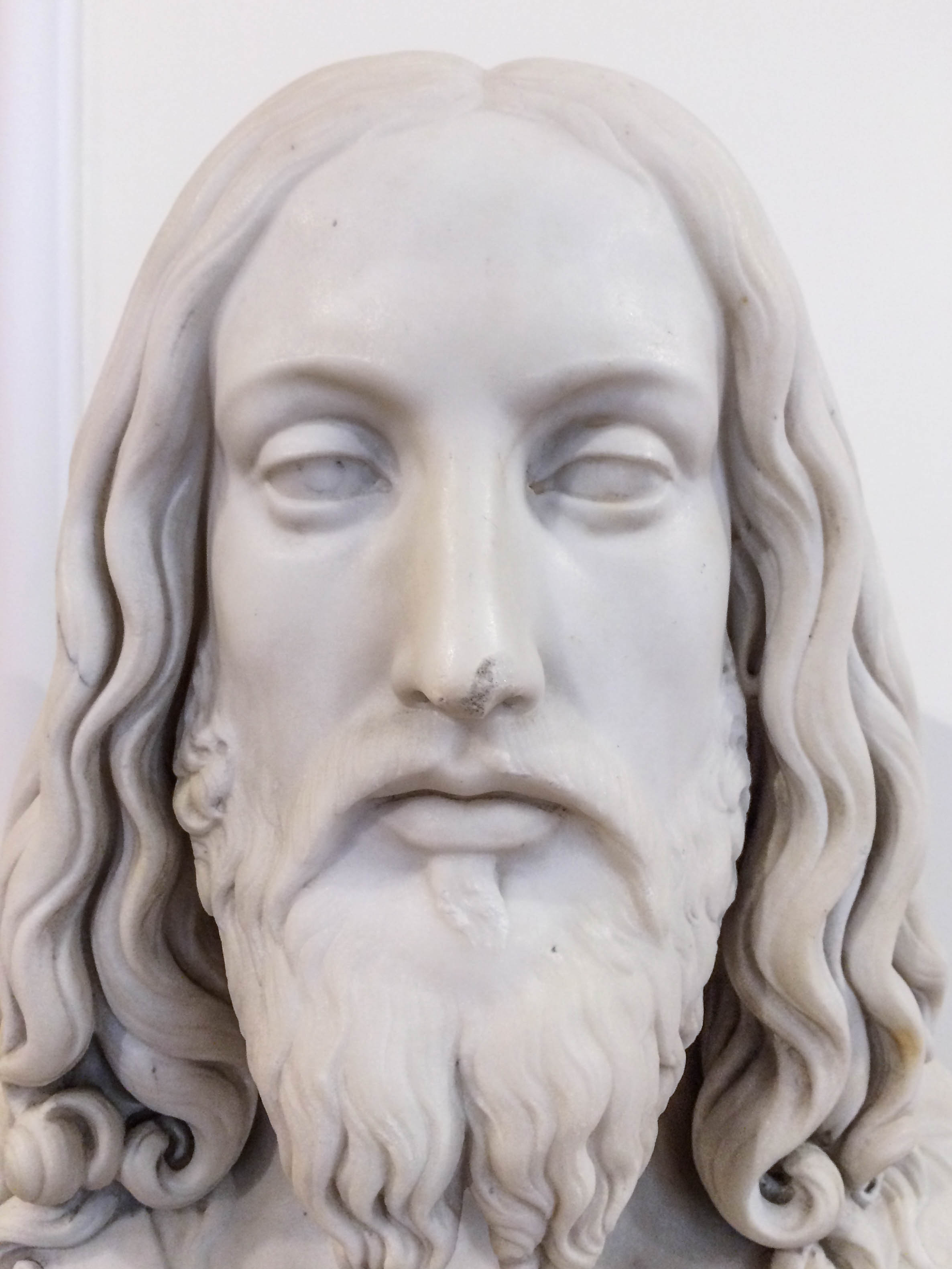
Bust of Jesus Christ
