= Francesca Magliani =

Italian painter

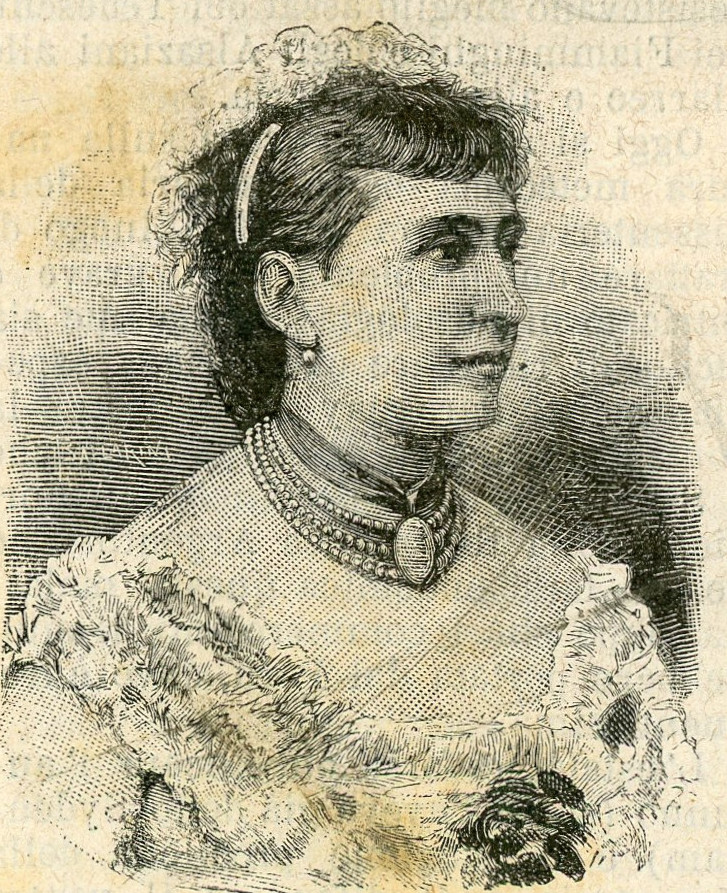
- Born: 1845; Palermo, Kingdom of the Two Sicilies
- Died: 1910
- Known for: Portraits

Francesca Gambacorta Magliani was an Italian painter, born on July 8, 1845, in Palermo, Kingdom of the Two Sicilies.

== Biography ==
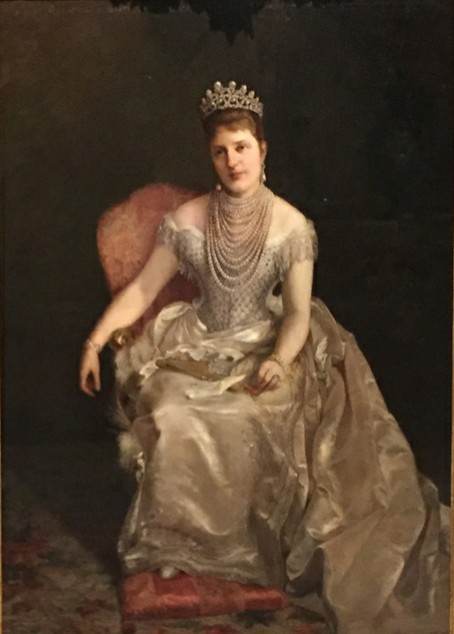
Queen Margherita of Savoy painted by Magliana

Magliani studied under private tutors in Palermo, then moved to Florence to study under professors Beducci and Michele Gordigiani. She made reproductions of antique masters. Among her works are: Portrait of her mother, Modesty and Vanity, Portrait of Deputy Guido Baccelli, the minister of public education, and Portrait of Agostino Magliani, her husband, who was minister of finance. She was noted for her portraiture, and for her use of pastels. To the Exposition Beatrice in Florence, she sent a life-size portraits of King and Queen Umberto and Margherita.

Subsequently, the artist painted the portrait of Princess Elena of Savoy (post 1896), which is located in the Quirinale Palace and was exhibited in the exhibition The Quirinale. From the unification of Italy to our days, which took place from 30 November 2011 to 17 March 2012 at the Quirinale Palace, on the occasion of the celebrations for the 150th anniversary of the unification of Italy.
