= Psyche Abandoned (sculpture) =

Sculpture by Pietro Tenerani

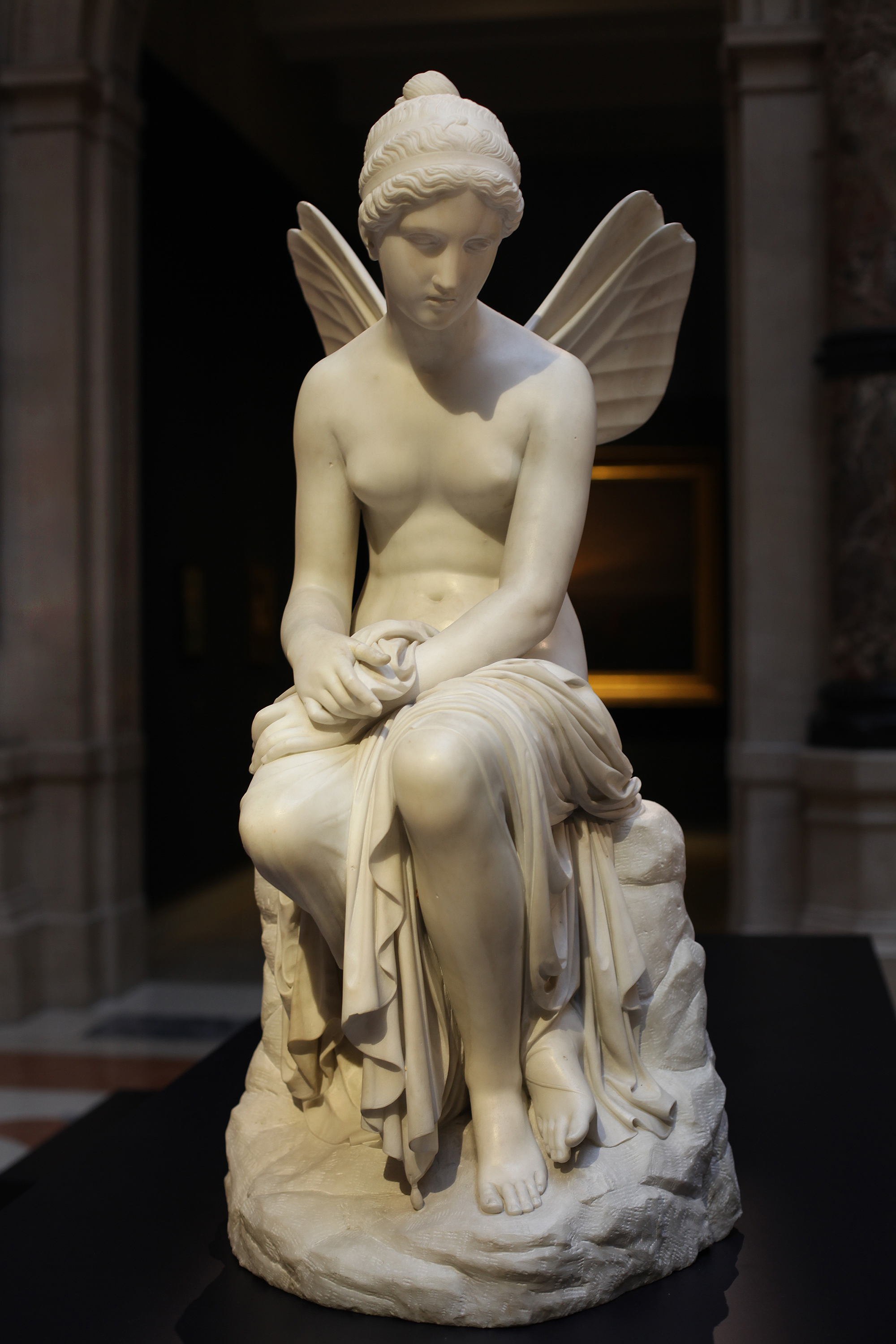
- Artist: Pietro Tenerani
- Year: 1817

Psyche Abandoned is a sculpture of 1817 by the Italian sculptor Pietro Tenerani (1789–1869). The plaster original is in the Museo di Roma in the Palazzo Braschi in Rome, and its many replicas include a marble version of c. 1819 in the Gallery of Modern Art in the Palazzo Pitti in Florence. It is one of the most famous Italian Neoclassical sculptures, and was Tenerani's first major artistic success.
