= Cesare Mussini =

Italian painter

Cesare Mussini (June 5, 1804 in Berlin – May 24, 1879 in Florence) was a German-Italian painter. He spent many years of his life as a painter in Russia.

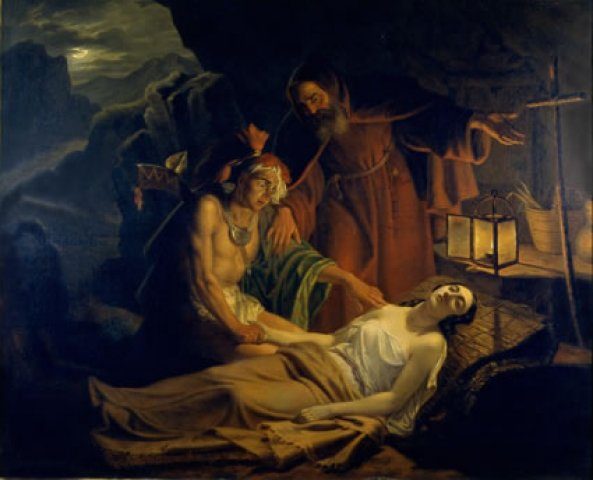
Death of Atala.

== Biography ==
He moved to Florence as a young man with his younger brother, Luigi Mussini (born 1813), and there sought training at the Florentine Academy of Fine Arts. Mussini showed promise as a student. In 1823 he won an award for his watercolor painting. The following year his oil sketch was also awarded by the academy. He would later become a professor at said Academy. Among his paintings are Leonardo da Vinci dies in the arms of Francis I (1828); Tasso reads poetry to Eleonora d'Este; Raphael and the Fornarina; Death of Atala; Stanislaw Poniatowski frees his Polish Slave; Archangel Saint Michael (1868); and Imelda de' Lambertazzi with Bonifacio de'Geremei.

Mussini moved to Rome in 1828, where he became friends with French intellectuals and artists such as François-René de Chateaubriand, who was the incumbent ambassador, and Horace Vernet, the director of the French Academy.

Mussini returned to Florence in 1832. He was a sought-after portrait artist, with clients from around the world. From October 1834 he began to teach at the Academy of Fine Arts. That same year he was commissioned by Raphael Finzi Morelli to paint frescoes in his house in the Piazza Santa Maria Novella.
