= Ambrogio Zuffi =

Italian sculptor

Ambrogio Zuffi (1833–1922) was an Italian sculptor of the neoclassical period.

He was born in Ferrara and initially trained there under Giuseppe Ferrari, moving in 1855 to Rome to work under Pietro Tenerani. He returned to Ferrara where he completed a number of monumental and civic works, including a bust of Vittorio Emanuele II, a model for the Monument to Savonarola, "Bacco indiano", and Samson and Delilah.

Zuffi excelled in sculptural portraits. He completed tomb monuments for the Bellonzi and Soldati families in the Certosa di Ferrara. The bas-relief portrait at his tomb is a self-portrait. He made stucco models of the Maffei family now conserved in the Palazzo Schifanoia and of Ferdinando Canonici, now in the Pinacoteca Civica of Ferrara.

He was part of the commission that selected works for the Civic Museum located in the Palazzo dei Diamanti. He died in Ferrara.
