= Wabasha IV =

Mdewakanton Dakota minister

Wabasha IV (1854–1925) was a Mdewakanton Dakota minister, also known as "Hdakinyan" and Napoleon Wabasha. As a young man he served as a scout for the 7th Cavalry Regiment 1873–4. He was elected to the tribal council of the Santee Sioux Reservation in 1878, when the Santees voted to end the old chief system. He became a United States citizen in 1909.
