= Amos Cassioli =

Italian painter (1832–1891)

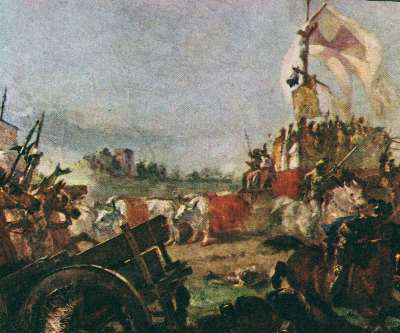
Amos Cassioli, Il Carroccio di Legnano

Amos Cassiòli (10 August 1832 – 17 December 1891) was an Italian painter of battle scenes, historical canvases and portraits. He worked in a Purismo style.

== Biography ==
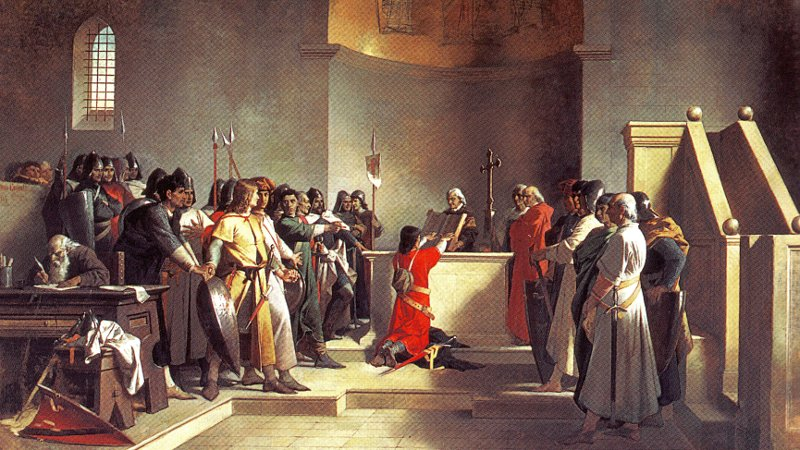
The Oath of Pontida forming the Lombard League

Cassioli was born in Asciano. After studying at the Sienese Academy of Fine Arts under Luigi Mussini, a stipend from Grand Duke Ferdinand IV of Tuscany enabled him and Angelo Visconti to study in Rome. At the end of 1860 he established himself in Florence which, although he maintained his links with Siena, became his permanent home.

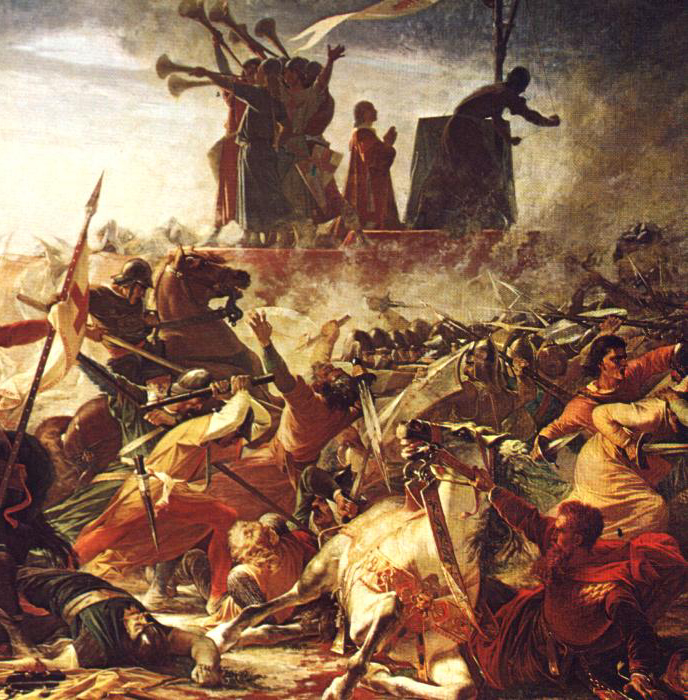
Battaglia di Legnano (Battle of Legnano) (detail) (1860–1870)

Regarded as an excellent portraitist, Cassioli is also noted for his large-scale history paintings which include the Battle of Legnano (1860–1870, Florence, Galleria di arte moderna, Palazzo Pitti) and Il giuramento di Pontida (1884, Siena, Palazzo Pubblico). Between 1884 and 1886 he executed frescoes in the Sala del Risorgimento of the Palazzo Pubblico depicting the battles of San Martino and Palestro. He also painted and altarpiece for the Collegiata di Santa Maria Assunta in Casole d'Elsa, where he worked alongside Antonio Ridolfi.

He was known also for paintings on classical subjects; many of these, following a 1991 bequest, are conserved in the Museo Cassioli of his native town Asciano. A self-portrait is found in the museum.

Cassioli was a mentor to his son Giuseppe Cassioli, a painter and sculptor. Other pupils were Napoleone Boni and Ada Mangilli. He died in Florence in 1891.
