= Napoleone Sommaruga =

Italian painter

Napoleone Sommaruga (1848–1906) was an Italian painter, active in Lombardy, painting mainly sacred subjects.

He was born in Milan, he exhibits in 1872, in Milan, a painting depicting: Choir of Gothic Chapel; Chapel of the Passion in the church of San Marco in Milan; Chapel of St Jerome in the Basilica of Sant'Eustorgio in Milan; Interior of the Duomo of Milan and Sacristy of the Canons;Sacristy of the Duomo; Interior of the Church of Sant'Alessandro of Milan, are two paintings exhibited in 1881 at the Brera Academy. He also exhibited at the 1876 Centennial Exposition in Philadelphia.
