= Napoleone Orsini =

Napoleone Orsini may refer to several members of the Orsini family:

- Napoleone Orsini I, brother of Matteo Rosso the Great
- Napoleone Orsini (died 1267), founder of the Bracciano branch
- Napoleone Orsini (cardinal)
- Napoleone Orsini (condottiero)
