= Fedele Caggiano =

Italian sculptor (1804–1880)

Fedele Caggiano (Buonalbergo (Benevento), March 3, 1804 – 1880) was an Italian sculptor, active in styles spanning both neoclassical and Romantic periods.

== Biography ==
He was attracted to sculpture as a youth, and was sent to Rome to apprentice with Pietro Tenerani, likely under a stipend of the Institute of Fine Arts of Naples. He lived in cities throughout Italy. In Foggia, he sculpted a monument for the Barone family. In Corfu, he created a monument for a British official. The city of Naples commissioned a statue of A Bacchante once found in the Villa Nazionale. He also completed La Jone. At the 1846 Exposition of Foggia he was awarded the gold medal for a marble portrait. For the City of Benevento, he completed three busts: Vittorio Emanuele II, Prince Umberto, and Margherita of Savoy, now in the Palazzo di Paolo V. He also completed a Tasso nelle sue furie sold in Naples.
