= Pietro Ridolfi =

Italian painter

Pietro Ridolfi (fl. 1710–1716) was an Italian engraver of the late Baroque period.

He is known for a frontispiece which he engraved from a design by C. N. Lampare, affixed to a volume containing views of ancient and modern Rome, published at Venice in 1716. It is executed in a style resembling that of Cornelis Bloemaert.
