= Ludovico Raymond =

Italian painter (1825–1898)

Ludovico Raymond (1825 in Turin – 1898) was an Italian painter.

== Biography ==
He was a resident of Turin, where he trained with Carlo Arienti at the Albertina Academy. Afterwards he traveled through Italy, including a five-year stay in Florence. In 1852 at the Promotrice of Turin, he exhibited: Ovid condemned to exile. Among other works are L'Ermete; Offering to the domestic Lares; and L'ora del pasto del Dio Apis. Among those depicting Greco-Roman subjects are: La donna greca adultera (Royal Palace Turin); Gli schiavi al Tempio; Nero; Virgil and Octavia Augusta: Le vestali; Ovid exiled at Tomi. Among those depicting Byzantine subjects are: The Iconoclasts and Emperor Justinian. Among those depicting Biblical subjects are: Noah: Judah; Messa al Monte Carmelo (1880); Relics of Golgotha; The Viaticum (at the Palazzo Reale of Turin); Lo Stipettaio, Holy Family; and Dying Magdalen. Among those depicting Medieval subjects are: Le spie; Sons of Charlemagne; Mercatanti veneziani; Héloïse and Abelard; Pope Clement VII; Le Fioraje Veneziane alla Feste delle Marie; Doge Nicolò Tron; Gli amanuensi di Monte Cassino; Disquisizioni letterarie in casa di Aldo Manuzio; La Badessa Morosini; King Arduin becomes a Monk; King Desiderius; Dante al Consiglio di San Geminiano, Ricreazione di monache: Emperor Diocletian; Antonio Foscarini; and Elisabetta Zeno.
