= Napoleone Boni =

Italian painter

Napoleone Boni (1863 in Massa Carrara – 1927 in Castelfiorentino, near Florence) was an Italian painter.

He first studied in the studio of Amos Cassioli in Florence, then worked in the Parisian studio of Carolus-Duran. He often painted subjects in oriental garb. In the 1887 National Exposition of Venice, he displayed an Odalisque. In 1889 in Florence, he exhibited Il Maglio. He also painted historical subjects such as Evangelista Torricelli invents the Barometer (Brera Academy, Milan).
