= Luigi Mussini =

Italian painter (1813–1888)

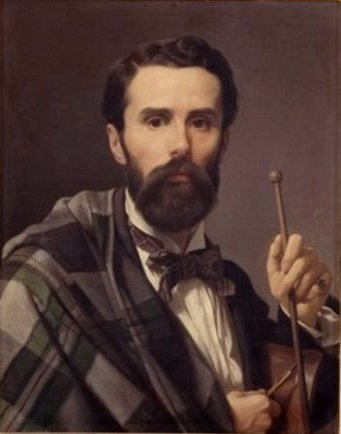
Self-portrait (c.1850)

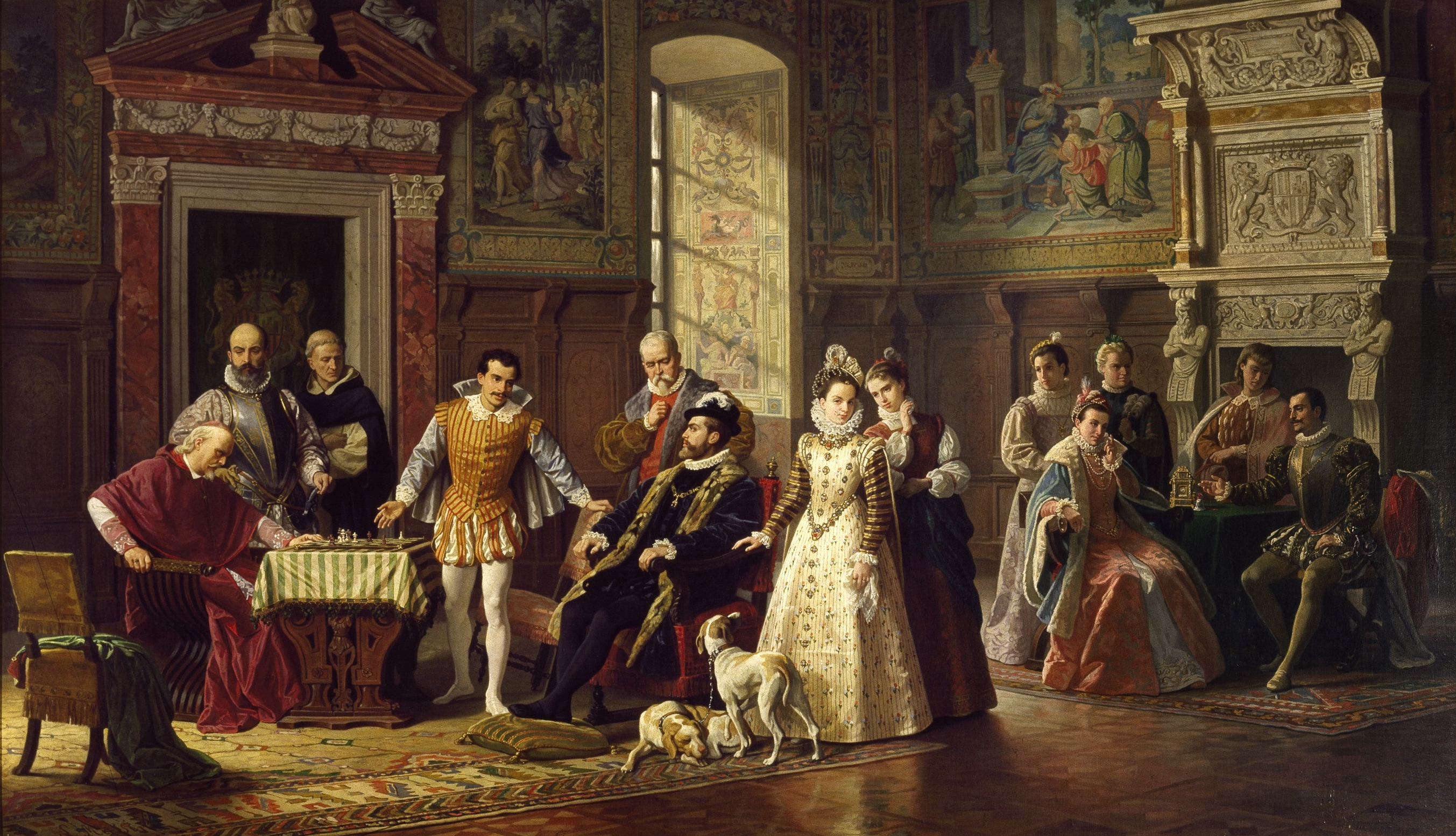
Game of Chess between Ruy Lopez and Leonardo da Cutro at the Spanish Court

Luigi Mussini (19 December 1813 – 18 June 1888) was an Italian painter, linked especially to the Purismo movement and to the Nazarenes.

== Life ==
Mussini was born in Berlin, son of the composer Natale Mussini, Kapellmeister at the Prussian court, and his wife Giuliana, musician and singer, daughter of the composer Giuseppe Sarti. He studied at the Accademia delle Belle Arti in Florence under Pietro Benvenuti and Giuseppe Bezzuoli. He began working with his older brother, Cesare Mussini, who had also trained at the Academy.

In 1840 he obtained a study grant which enabled him to spend four years in Rome studying painting. He was inspired by the masters of the Quattrocento and in 1844 he opened a school in Florence, where among his students were Silvestro Lega and Michele Gordigiani.

In 1848 he joined as a patriotic volunteer in the First Italian War of Independence. Disillusioned by the unhappy outcome, he withdrew to Paris, where he frequented the studios of Ingres, Jean-Hippolyte Flandrin, William Haussoullier and other artists.

In 1852 he move to Siena to teach at that city's Academy of Fine Arts, where his pupils included Angelo Visconti, Amos Cassioli, Cesare Maccari, Pietro Aldi, Alessandro Franchi and Ricciardo Meacci.

Mussini's wife Luigia Mussini Piaggio, also a painter, died in labor in 1865 giving birth to their daughter Luisa Mussini who became the wife (and assistant) in 1893 of her father's former pupil Alessandro Franchi.

Among his works are:

- Musca Sacra (1841)
- L Elemosina secondo il Vangelo
- I profanotori del Tempio
- Il trionfo della Verita
- I Parentali de Platone
- L'Eudoro and Cimodocea compare paganism to christianity
- Decamerone Senese
- L'educazione a Sparta (1869)

== Sources ==
- Luigi Mussini (in Italian)
- Pierini, Marco (2012). "MUSSINI, Luigi". Dizionario Biografico degli Italiani (in Italian). Vol. 77: Morlini–Natolini. Rome: Istituto dell'Enciclopedia Italiana. ISBN 978-88-12-00032-6.
