= Carceri =

Carceri is Italian for 'prisons'. It may refer to:

- Carceri d'Invenzione (Imaginary Prisons), a series of prints (1750–1761) by Piranesi
- Carceri, Veneto, a municipality in Padua, Italy
- Carceri (band), a Dutch death metal band
- Carceri (Dungeons & Dragons) or the Tarterian Depths of Carceri, a plane of existence in the Dungeons & Dragons game

== See also ==
- Dalle Carceri, a noble family of Verona and Frankish Greece
- Carceri di Sant'Ansano, Siena, a church in Tuscany, Italy
- Carcieri v. Salazar, a 2009 U.S. court case about tribal lands
- Eremo delle Carceri, monastery in Umbria
- Santa Maria delle Carceri, Prato, a church in Prato, Tuscany, Italy
