= Institute of Santa Teresa, Siena =

Institute in Siena, Italy

Coordinates: 43°18′51.9″N 11°19′40.6″E

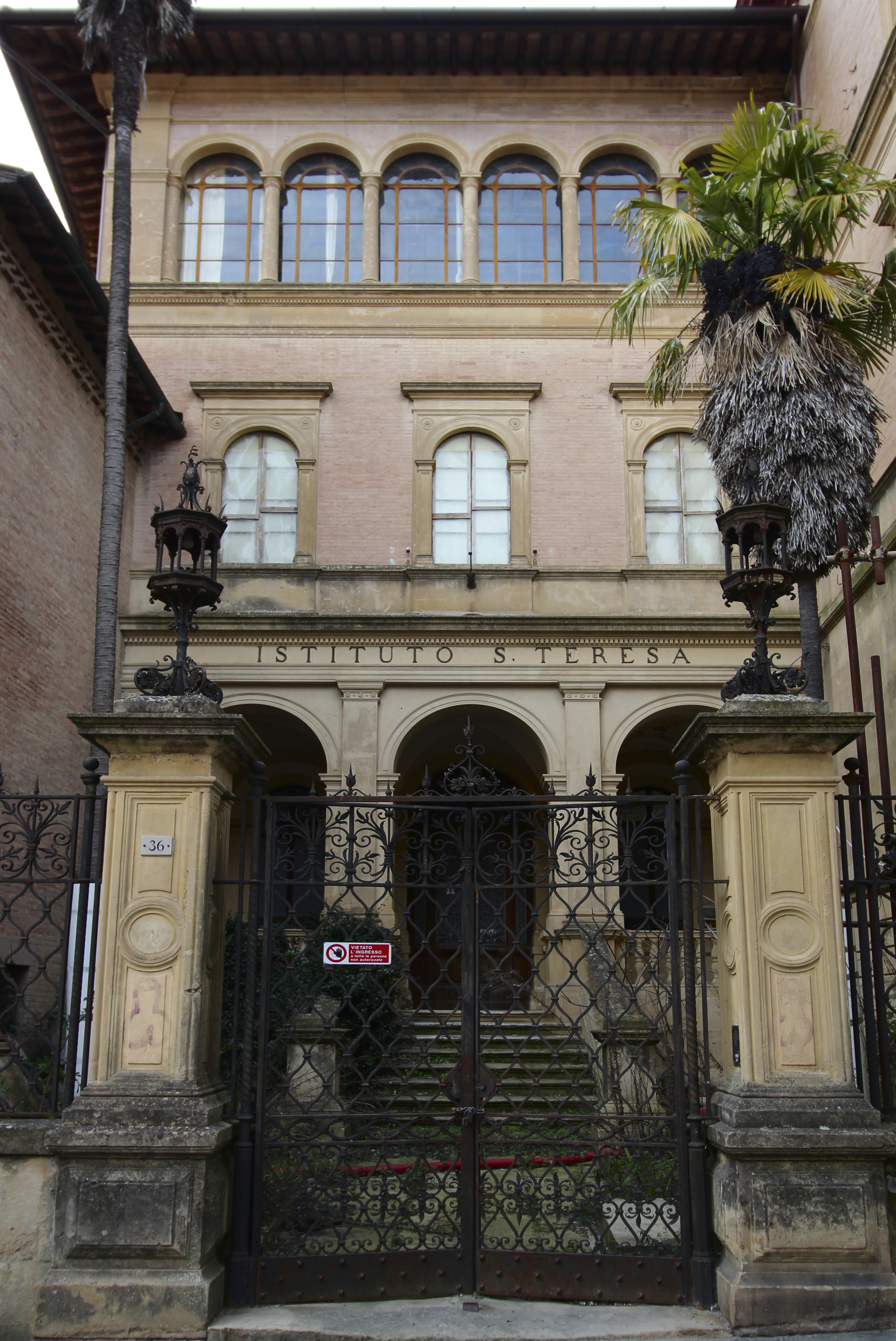
Institute of Santa Teresa, Siena

The former Institute of Santa Teresa and Oratory of Santa Teresa are encompassed by buildings located on via San Quirico #36 in Siena, region of Tuscany, Italy. The oratory is located inside the former Institute. Facing the Carceri di Sant'Ansano, the entrance is found to the right through the wrought iron gateway between pilasters holding lamps, leading to three archways. The former Institute building extends down the street to the right, and constitutes an example of late 19th-century Renaissance Revival architecture.

== History ==
The complex and the oratory were commissioned by the Monsignor Leopoldo Bufalini as a school for girls. Construction in a Neo-Renaissance style took place between 1877 and 1885, using designs by Giuseppe Partini. The entrance archways lead to a double ramp stairwell with loggia decorated by Giorgio Bandini and L. Mazzuoli in 1875-1880. In the reception hall were frescoes by Ricciardo Meacci.

The oratory or chapel had highly decorated wood ceilings, elaborately carved by Giorgio Badini. The main altarpiece was a Transverberation of St Teresa of Ávila (1875) by Alessandro Franchi. The altar was sculpted by Leopoldo Maccaro. The ceiling has a St Simon Stock Receives the Carmelite Habit (Brown Scapular) from the Virgin also by Franchi (1884).

The oratory had a number of canvases, among them Prophets Elias and Eliseo, a St Girolamo Emiliani and a Santa Cecilia painted by Ricciardo Meacci (1856-1938). Franchi also painted a Madonna del Carmine with Saints Agnes and Louis; Gaetano Marinelli (1835-1924) painted Saints Joseph, Bernardino, and Catherine; Giuseppe Catani painted a Santa Caterina delle Ruote; and Leone Leoncini painted a St Vincent of Paul and a St Thomas Acquinas and St Giuseppe Calasanzio.
