= Stefano Bonsignori =

Stefano Bonsignori may refer to:

- Stefano Bonsignori (bishop) (1738–1826), Italian cleric, bishop and theologian
- Stefano Bonsignori (cartographer) (died 1589), monk and cartographer from Florence, Italy
