= History of the Jews in Florence =

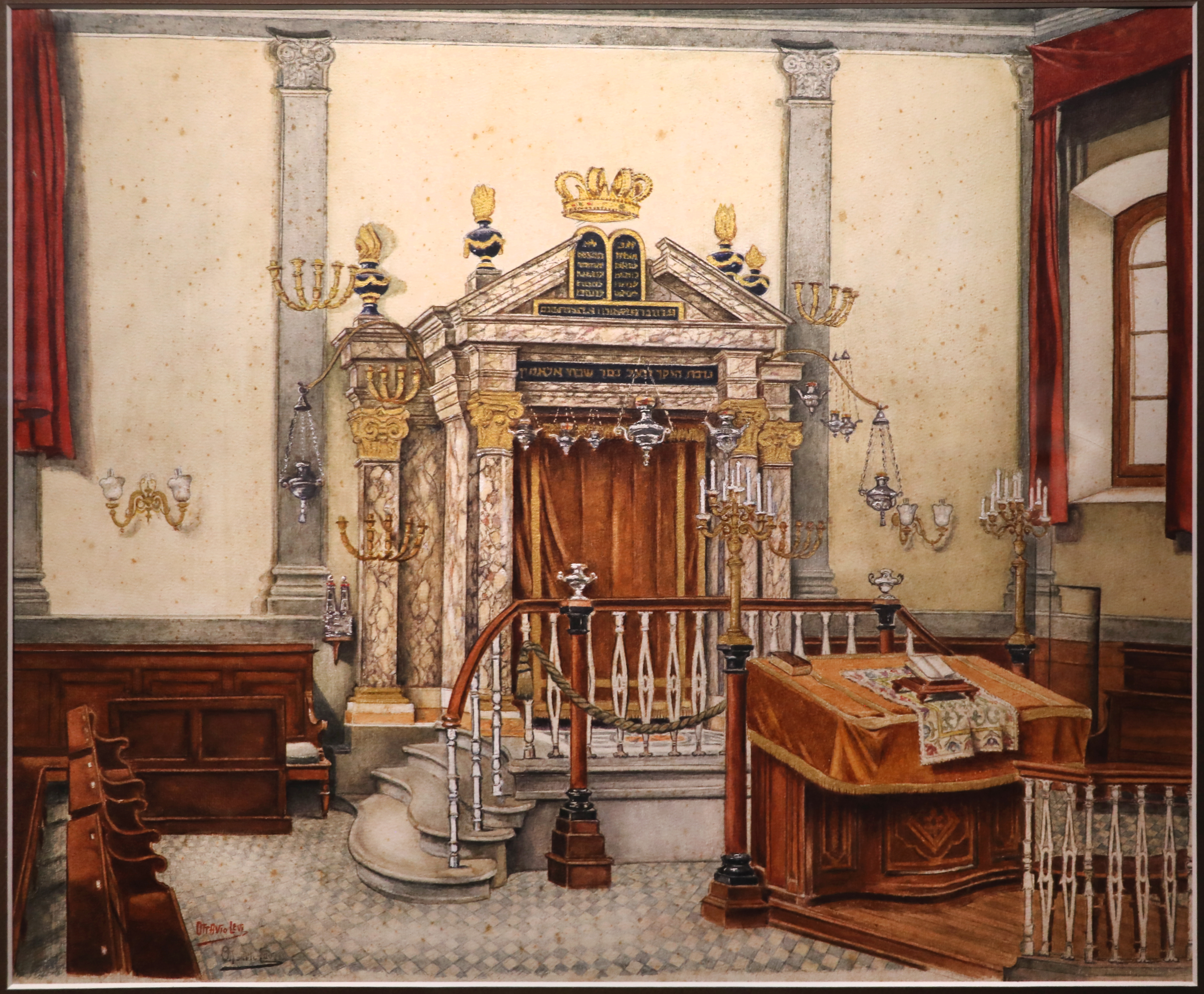
Interior of the now disappeared Via delle Oche Synagogue, c. 1890

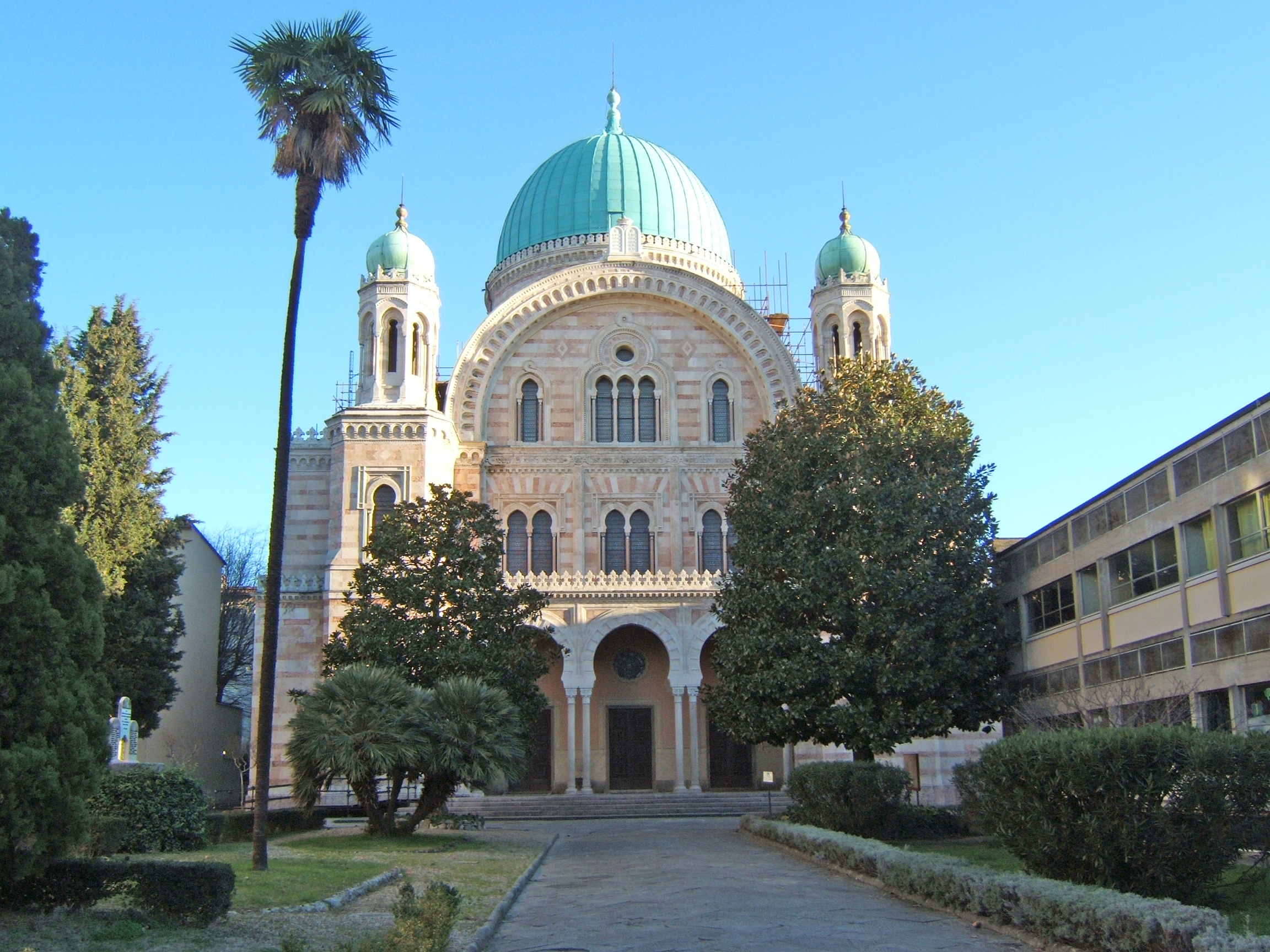
The Great Synagogue of Florence

The history of the Jews in Florence can be traced over nine hundred years. Florence (Italian: Firenze) is the capital city of the Italian region of Tuscany and of the province of Florence. The Jews of Florence have one of the oldest continuous Jewish communities in Europe. The historic Jewish community in Florence is one of the largest and one of the most influential Jewish communities in Italy. The Jewish community in Florence also serves the smaller neighboring Jewish communities in Pisa, Livorno, and Siena.

== Ancient and Medieval history ==
While the evidence of Jews living in Tuscany in the Roman Era is scant, Benjamin of Tudela recorded finding a Jewish community in Florence when he visited in 1159. The history of the Jews in Florence really begins with Italian Jews from the south emigrating to Florence and the Tuscan region by the beginning of the 14th century. Many Jews who settled in Florence were merchants and money lenders. Emanuel ben Uzziel da Camerino was one of the first known Jews of Florence whose name was recorded.

In 1428, the small Jewish community in Florence lent funds to Pope Martin V in exchange for his protection for the local Jews. The Jewish community in Florence was formally founded in 1437.

The Medici family of Florence was closely linked to the Jews of Florence. For instance, the Medicis protected the Jews of Florence from sermons by fanatical Roman Catholic clergy, such as Bernardino da Feltre and Girolamo Savonarola who both pursued a policy of expulsion. Some of the expulsion orders were tied to plague hysteria. However, when the Medicis fell briefly from power in the 1490s, the Jews of Florence were ordered to leave the city. Fortunately, Jewish money loaned to the Republic of Florence delayed the expulsion until the Medicis returned to power in 1512.

During this time Jewish physicians and scholars were called to the court of the Medicis. In 1537, a Sephardic Jew by the name of Jacob Abravanel from Ferrara was instrumental by influencing Cosimo I de' Medici in allowing Sephardic Jews and Marranos from Spain and Portugal to settle in Florence. Thus the growth of the Jewish community began to increase. In addition to Sephardic Jews, more Italian Jews from the Papal States also arrived. However, once Cosimo de Medici consolidated his power, he began to enact anti-Jewish laws such as special dress codes for the Jews. He also created the Jewish ghetto of Florence in 1571.

Life in the Florence ghetto was compulsory for most but not all Jews. However, within the ghetto, the Jews had a certain amount of legal and governmental autonomy. They established synagogues, schools, kosher markets, and ritual bath houses. By the 1600s, the Italian Jews of Florence began to feel disenfranchised by the growing number of Spanish/Portuguese Jews. Tensions between the two groups rose as Sephardic rite congregations began to compete with the native Italian rite congregations. Despite the rift, both groups lived peacefully side by side. By the 18th century, there were about a thousand Jews living the ghetto of Florence. At this time, a small Hebrew printing shop began to publish works such as Aaron ben Jacob ha-Kohen's Orot Hayyim.

== Modern history ==
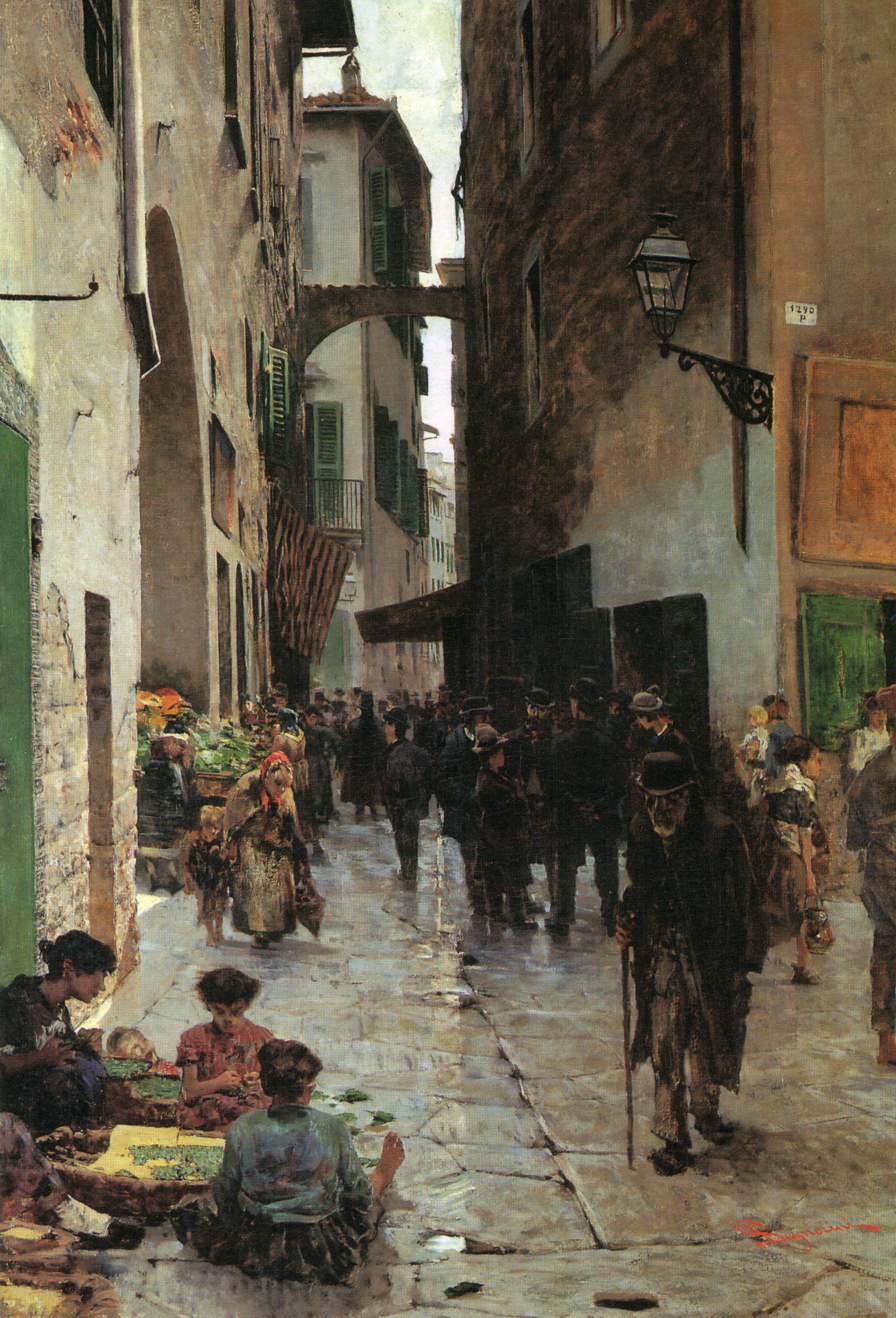
Ghetto of Florence, T. Signorini, 1882

In 1799, emancipation came to the Jews of Florence from Napoleonic forces who occupied the city. In 1848, the ghetto was abolished and the Jews of Florence were given civil rights under a new constitution. By 1861, the Jews were given full citizenship and the ghetto was leveled to make room for urban renewal. The Great Synagogue was built in 1882. In 1899, the Collegio Rabbinco Italiano (Rabbinical College of Padua) was relocated to Florence. An Ashkenazi Rabbi, Samuel Hirsch Margulies, became the principal of the college where he remained until his death in 1922. Rabbi Margulies was an ardent Zionist and was very popular with the young Jews of Florence. Other notable Rabbis of Florence during this era include: Riccardo Pacifici, Zwi Perez Chajes, and Israel Zolli.

== Holocaust ==
By 1931, there were about 3,000 Jews living in Florence. Life was pleasant for the Jews of Florence and they were represented in most segments of Italian society. However, with the outbreak of World War II and the Nazi invasion of Italy, life for the Jews of Florence quickly deteriorated. In 1943, Florence was occupied by Nazi forces. The Nazis and their fascist cohorts began to arrest and round up Jews. Deportation for the Jews began almost immediately and most Jewish families lost relatives. Dr. Rabbi Nathan Cassuto who was the Jewish communal leader of Florence and was the son of Rabbi Umberto Cassuto, was one of the first to be sent to Auschwitz. Of the 243 Jews deported, only 13 returned alive. However, many of the Jews of Florence escaped the Nazis by heroic Italians who hid the Jews during the Nazi occupation.

In addition to the arrests and deportations, the Nazis both looted and vandalized Jewish property. The Great Synagogue of Florence was damaged and nearly blown up by Germans. Most of its great art was stolen. By the end of the war, the Jewish population was reduced to less than 1600.

Since 2007, authorities have been investigating the murders of Robert Einstein (cousin of Albert Einstein) and his wife and daughter. They were murdered by Nazi soldiers near Il Focardo in August 1944. Especially, German Staatsanwaltschaft Landau/Pfalz is still investigating this case. The murder has been covered by Aktenzeichen XY… ungelöst on 23 February 2011.

== Today ==
The Jews of Florence began to rebuild after the war. They repaired the Great Synagogue and established a home for Jewish seniors in 1957 and a Jewish school in 1964. In 2007, the Jewish Museum of Florence was opened and there is a walking tour guide of Florence's Jewish history.

Today, the population of the Jewish community of Florence is over 800, and the Great Synagogue is the only orthodox one still in use.

In 2009, a rudimentary bomb was discovered outside the Chabad House in Florence. The bomb had failed to go off, and no injuries or damages occurred. The chief rabbi of Florence said that the event was "a very serious gesture that shows how one can pass from irresponsible words to actions such as this."

In addition to the Orthodox synagogue, there is also a small progressive Jewish community in Florence, called Shir Hadash.

== Great Synagogue of Florence ==
The Great Synagogue of Florence (Tempio Maggiore) is considered by many historians and architects as a building masterpiece. The synagogue was opened in 1882. Its Moorish motif and design was based on the Byzantine cathedral of the Hagia Sophia in Constantinople. In August 1944 German troops worked with Italian Fascists to destroy the synagogue, but the Italian resistance managed to defuse most of the explosives. Only a limited amount of damage was done. The synagogue was restored after the war. It was restored again after damage by massive flooding in 1966. Today, the synagogue is still open and regularly provides services to the Jewish community under the Sephardic rite of prayer.

From 1882 until 1964 an Ashkenazi synagogue existed in the Benivieni palace, commemorated by an historic plaque on the facade of the building, now the Hotel Beninieni, #5 Via delle Oche (close to the Duomo).

== External list ==
- The Jewish Community of Florence, The Museum of the Jewish People at Beit Hatfutsot
- http://moked.it/jewishflorence/
- http://www.florence-jewish-tours.com/images/Mappa%20Ebraica.jpg
- https://web.archive.org/web/20111002125651/http://www.highcountrypress.com/weekly/2010/07-15-10/italian-holocaust-survivors.htm
- http://www.hebrewhistory.info/factpapers/fp038-1_medici.htm
