= Charles Fairfax Murray =

English painter (1849–1919)

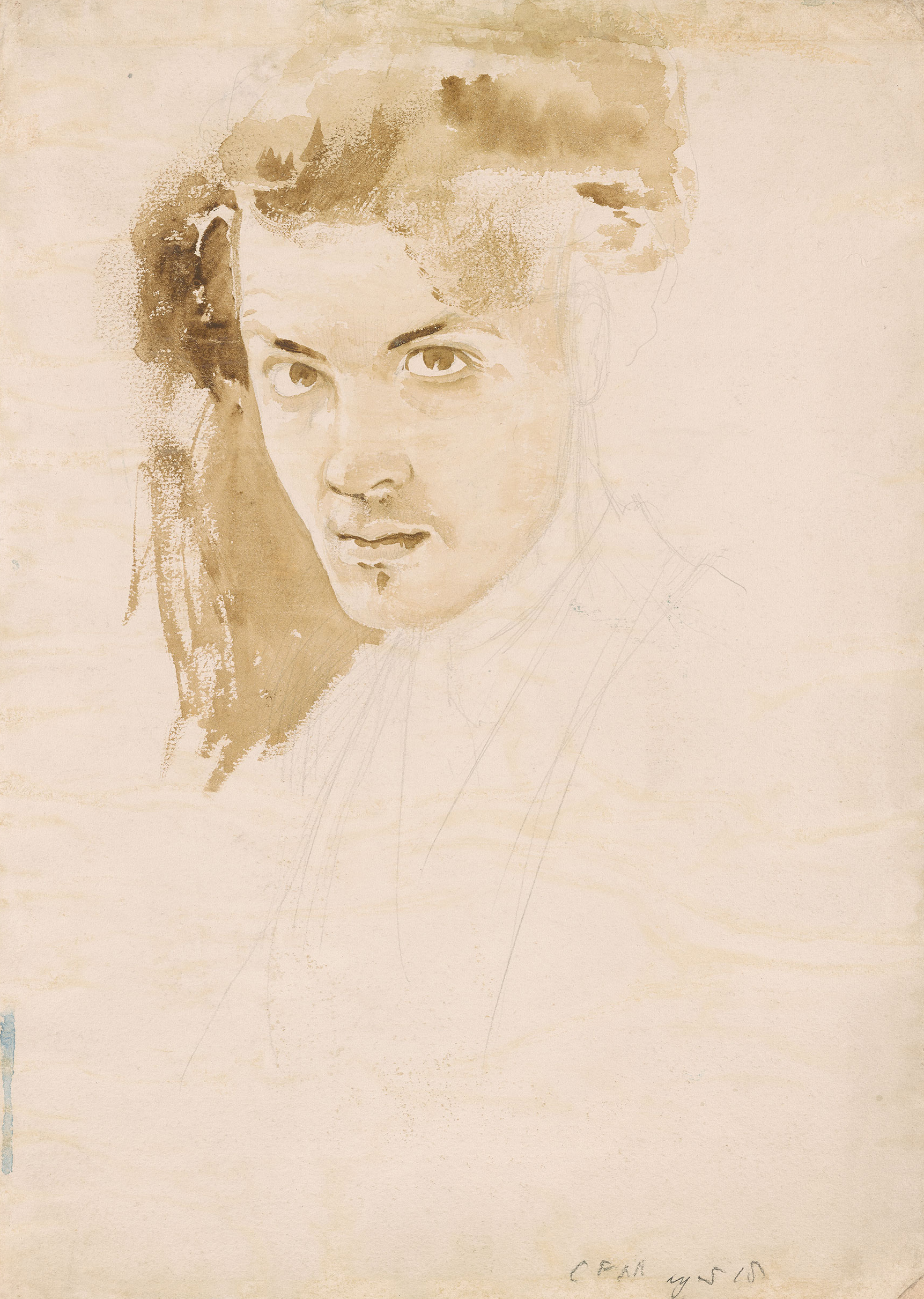
- Self-Portrait
- Born: 30 September 1849; Bow, London, England
- Died: 25 January 1919 (aged 69); London, England
- Occupations: painter, art historian

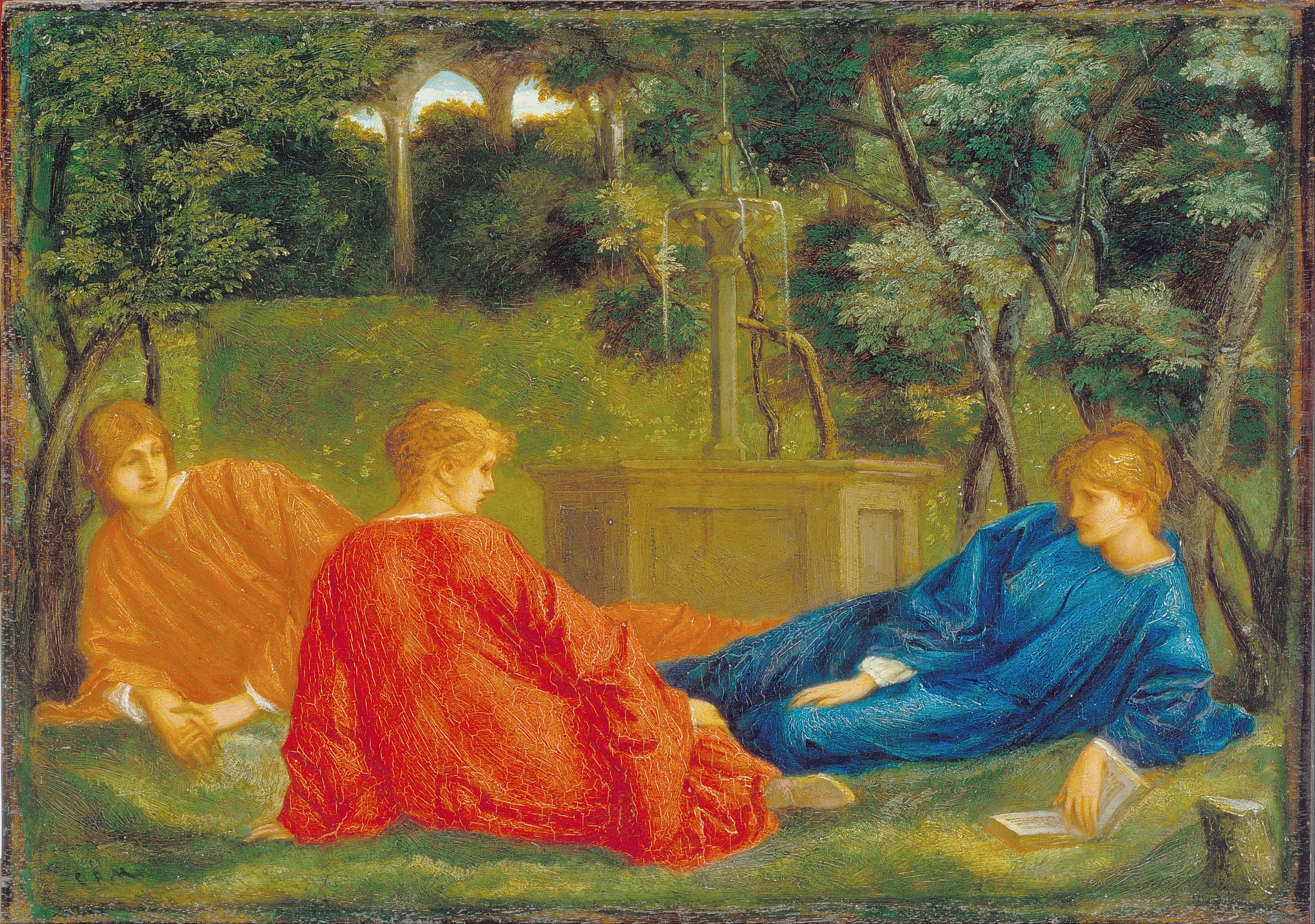
Murray's The Kings' Daughters, c. 1875

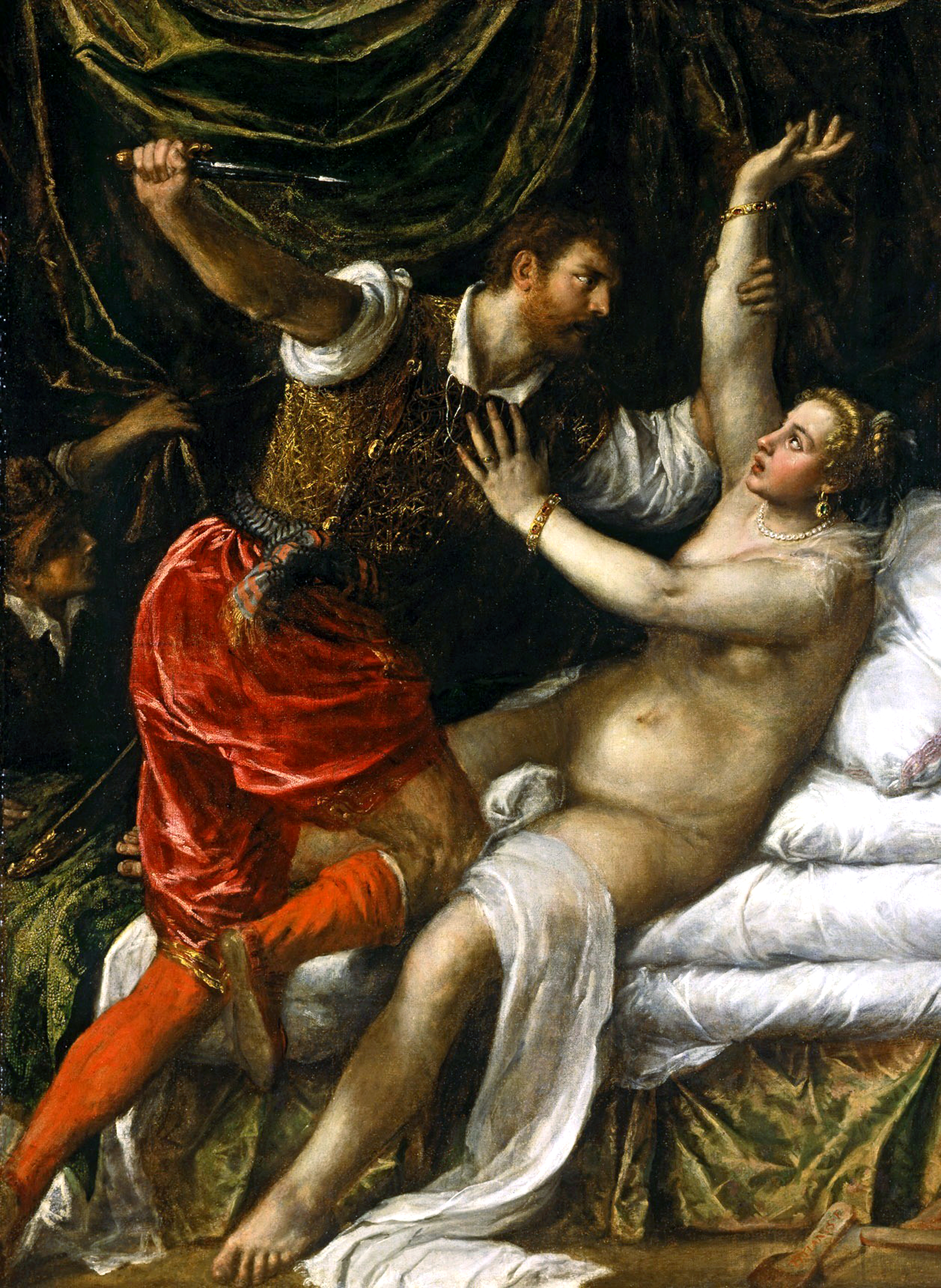
Titian's Tarquin and Lucretia (1571), given by Murray to the Fitzwilliam Museum, Cambridge

Charles Fairfax Murray (30 September 1849 – 25 January 1919) was a British painter, dealer, collector, benefactor, and art historian who was connected with the second wave of the Pre-Raphaelites.

== Early years ==
The youngest of four children, he was born on 30 September 1849 in Bow, near London, but grew up in Sudbury, Suffolk, where he studied drawing, possibly under Thomas Gainsborough's great nephew Gainsborough Dupont. At the age of 12 he was employed in the drawing office of the railway entrepreneurs Peto & Betts and was taken into Sir Samuel Morton Peto's home to draw portraits of his family.

Taken up by John Ruskin at the age of 16, Fairfax Murray was installed as Edward Burne-Jones's first studio assistant in 1867. He rapidly became one of the circle of Pre-Raphaelite founder Dante Gabriel Rossetti, and the friend of William Morris and Philip Webb. He was given work as artist and glass-painter for Morris, Marshall, Faulkner and Co., working to Burne Jones's designs; he also illuminated Morris's manuscripts.

== Painter, connoisseur and dealer ==
In 1872, he left England for Italy, where he worked as a copyist for Ruskin in Rome, Siena, Pisa, and Venice, allowing him to advance his study of the Italian masters. Having married the 16-year-old Angelica Collivichi and settled in Florence, he depended on this work to support his young family. He contributed to Giovanni Cavalcaselle's History of North Italian Painting. From Siena he maintained a lively correspondence with Morris, Webb and Burne-Jones; he also acted as agent for Sir Frederic William Burton, Director of the National Gallery. From 1877 he also enjoyed a long connection with Wilhelm von Bode, Director of Berlin's Gemäldegalerie, and partnered the London dealers Thomas Agnew & Sons in bringing pictures to market there.

The Sienese artist Ricciardo Meacci, a pupil of Luigi Mussini, told Helen Zimmern in 1899 that when he left his master (around 1880) and was trying to find his own path, it was Fairfax Murray who "first imbued him with the idea of painting in the style" of the medieval quattrocentisti, and that it was with Murray as his guide that he mastered these methods, and found his future artistic direction.

== Later years ==
In 1882 he returned to England, while his wife remained in Italy. He resumed his close friendships with Burne-Jones, Morris, Webb, and others of the Pre-Raphaelites and their patrons, and the Arts & Crafts movement. From 1888, he became intimate with Blanche Richmond, who had been sitting for him, and with whom he went on to father children. Murray was by then well respected as a connoisseur and advisor to private collectors. He also had a considerable and growing number of old master paintings of his own, including Rembrandt's Portrait of his Brother, Botticelli's Infant Jesus with the Virgin and St. John and van Dyck's Lucas Vosterman.

His aim was always to put the works he possessed into public collections; in 1904 he sold his collection of more than eight hundred Pre-Raphaelite drawings to Birmingham Museum and Art Gallery. He gave his Titian Tarquin and Lucretia, more than a dozen Constables, four early Gainsboroughs and a Corot to the Fitzwilliam Museum in Cambridge along with Morris proofs and manuscripts from William Morris's collection. Dulwich Picture Gallery benefited from a collection of 46 English portraits among many other gifts in his lifetime.

He died in London on 25 January 1919, following a series of strokes.
