= Tarquin and Lucretia =

1571 painting by Titian

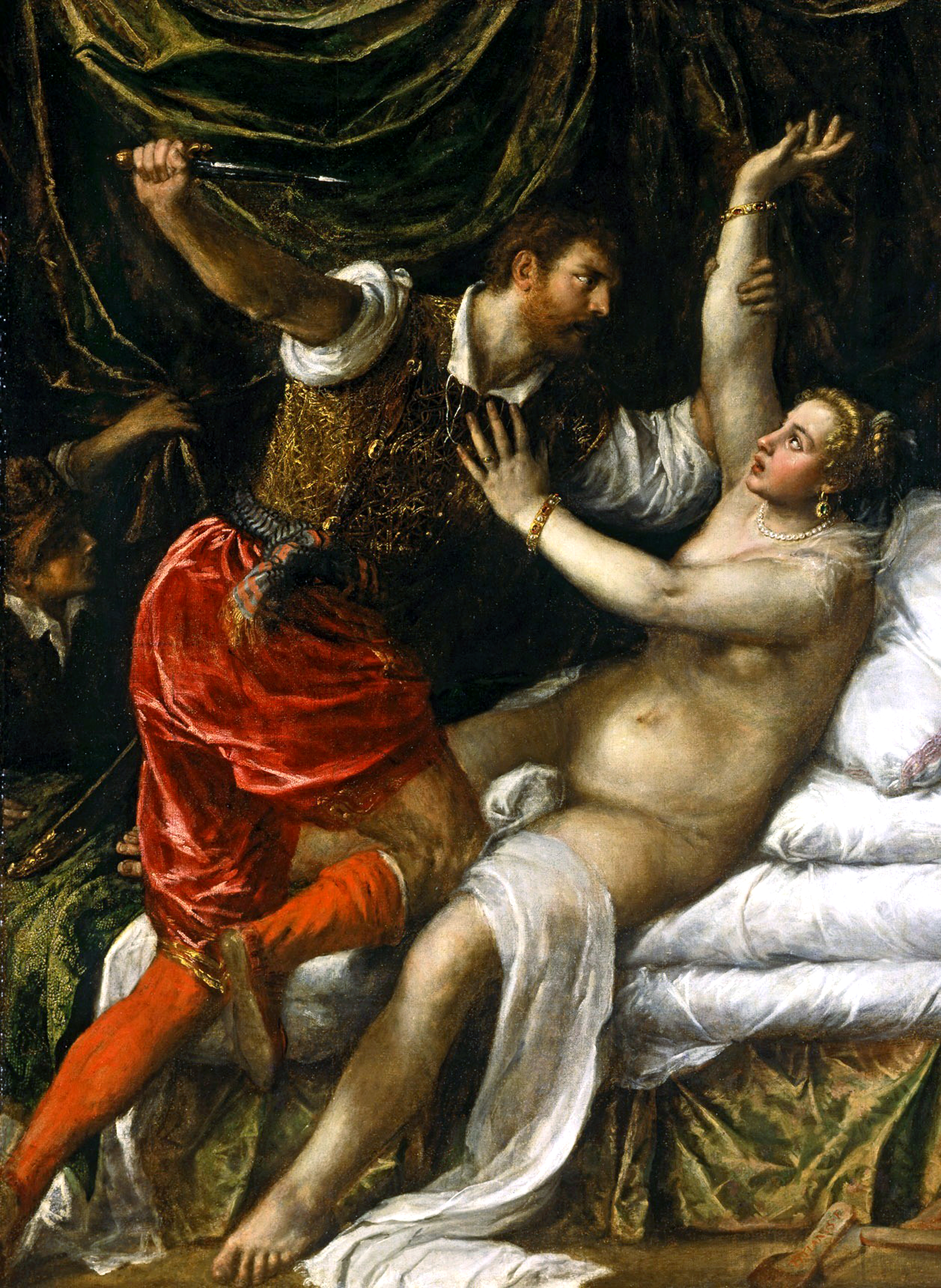
- Artist: Titian
- Year: 1571
- Medium: Oil on canvas
- Dimensions: 188.9 cm × 145.1 cm (74.4 in × 57.1 in)
- Location: Fitzwilliam Museum, Cambridge

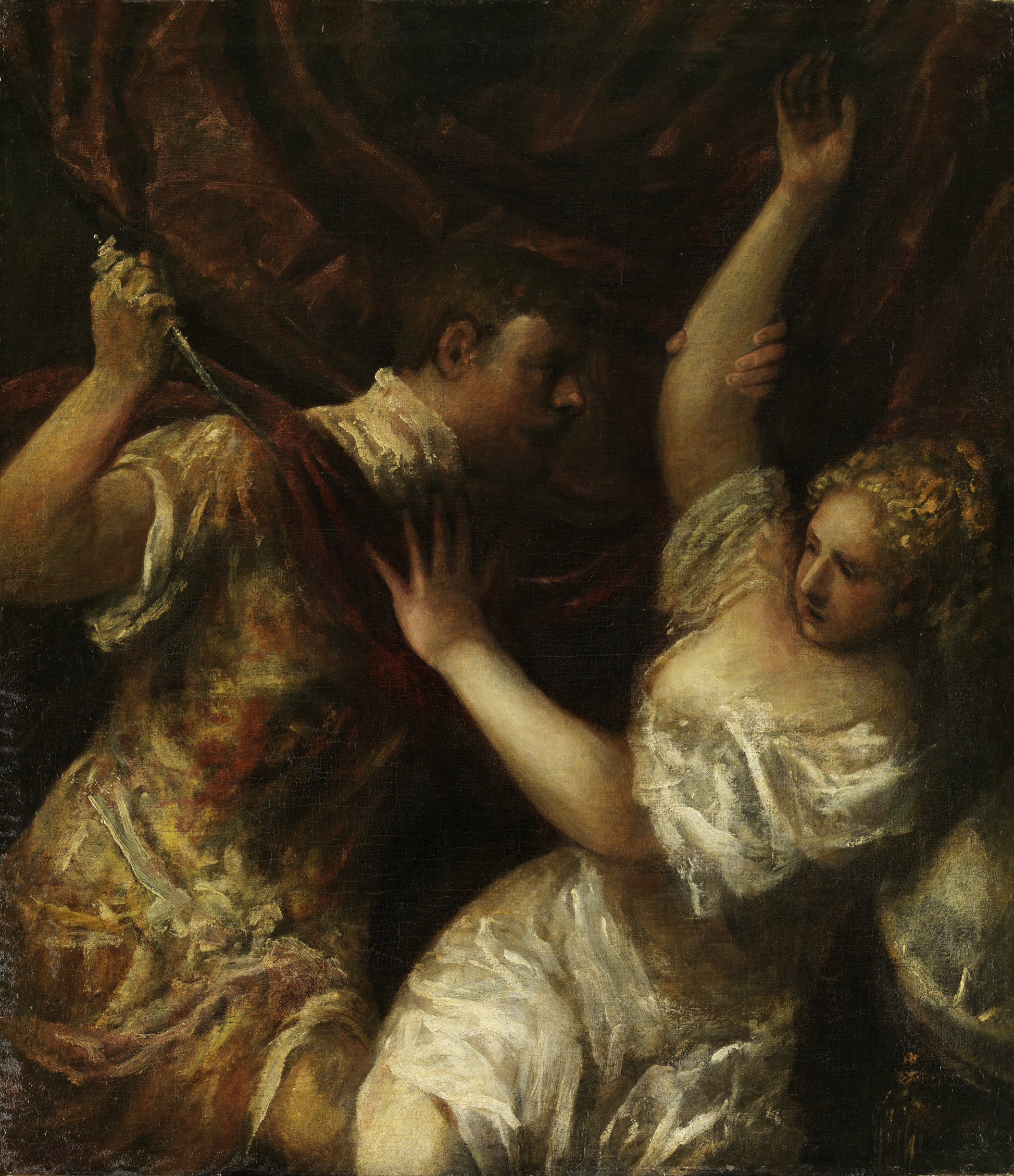
Loose or unfinished variant in Vienna, perhaps by Titian, 114 × 100 cm (44.9 × 39.4 in)

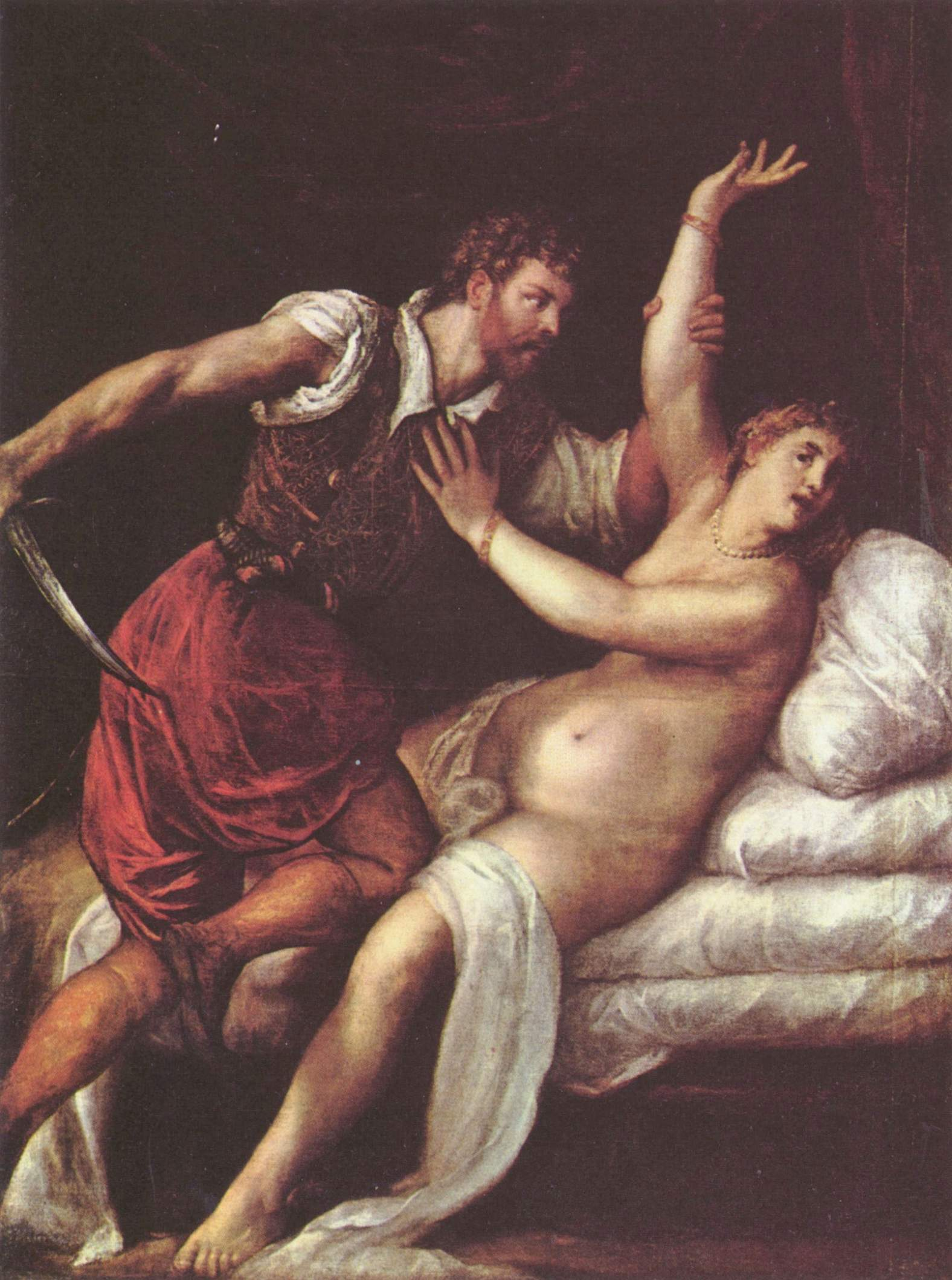
The Bordeaux version or copy, showing variations in the poses of the figures

Tarquin and Lucretia is an oil painting by Titian completed in 1571, when the artist was in his eighties, for Philip II of Spain. It is signed, and considered to have been finished entirely by Titian himself. It is one of a series of great works from Titian's last years, but unlike some of these, is fully finished. It is now in the Fitzwilliam Museum in Cambridge, England.

The story from early Roman history (or legend) of the rape of Lucretia by Sextus Tarquinius (Tarquin), and her subsequent suicide, was a popular subject in Renaissance art. Tarquin raped Lucretia after threatening to kill her if she rejected his advances; this is the moment shown here. The next day she exposed him and committed suicide, prompting the Romans to revolt and overthrow Tarquin's father Tarquin the Proud, the last king of Rome, and establish the Roman Republic. This is traditionally dated to 509 BC. Violent subjects are characteristic of Titian's last years, mostly drawn from mythology or religion, but the directness of this composition stands out among them.

The refinement of the poses of the figures is reflected in other contemporary versions of the painting. By this late stage in his career, Titian often took many years over paintings, setting them aside for long periods, only returning to them later. This painting is fully finished, and had been in progress for several years. As one of the latest documented and fully finished paintings by Titian, it is evidence for the much-debated question of whether other late Titians were ever finished or not.

== Subject ==
Most commonly, art depicted either the moment of the rape, or Lucretia is shown alone at the moment of her suicide. In this near life-size late version, which Titian said in a letter of 1568 (three years before it was completed) was "an invention involving greater labour and artifice than anything, perhaps, that I have produced for many years", the drama of the composition is heightened by small touches in pure white at the tip of the dagger and in Tarquin and Lucretia's eyes.

The head and hand entering from the left belong to a male slave; in Livy's telling Tarquin told Lucretia that if she did not yield to him, he would kill both Lucretia and the slave and then claim to have caught them during the act of adultery. The violent attack is closer to Ovid's account of the story, and although this is the only painting of a historical subject from Titian's last years, his mythological subjects are also all covered by Ovid. Lucretia wears her jewellery to bed, and Tarquin's clothes are modern and rich. Titian's signature is on the slipper at lower right. The painting has been trimmed on all sides, but it is not known when or by how much.

The subject was one of a group showing women from legend or the Bible who were powerless, or only able to escape their situation through suicide, such as Susanna, Dido of Carthage and Verginia. These formed a counterpoint to, or sub-group of, the set of subjects known as the Power of Women, showing female violence against, or domination of, men. These were often depicted by the same artists, and especially popular in Northern Renaissance art. The story of Esther lay somewhere between these two extremes.

== Influences and copies ==
Either Titian or, as is now thought more likely, his brother Francesco Vecellio (c. 1490–1559/60), had already painted the suicide, as "an elegant dance movement in a landscape", some 50 years earlier (now Royal Collection). Titian, or perhaps Palma Vecchio, had also painted a typical portrait of Lucretia holding a knife, but with the untypical addition of a male figure in deep shadow, either Tarquin or her husband, standing just behind her. This comes from 1514–15 and is now in the Kunsthistorisches Museum, Vienna, with an early copy in the Royal Collection.

Titian's new composition can be shown to have been influenced by Northern prints, and was itself immediately popularized by an engraving by Cornelius Cort, dated 1571, which is "evidently from some authorized modeletto". This reversed the composition (in a mirror image, as print copies naturally do) but another print published in Rome, presumably pirated, copied the print and so reversed the composition again to restore the original. The exact poses of the individual figures also have precedents, with Lucretia perhaps drawing from the female figure (Dirce) in the famous Roman sculpture known as the Farnese Bull.

The composition evolved as Titian worked on it, as is shown by x-rays of the painting, and a workshop copy now in the Musée des Beaux-Arts de Bordeaux (illustrated here), which reflects an earlier composition where the hand with the dagger is much lower, and threatening to thrust upwards not down. Here Lucretia's head is also turned away from Tarquin. The x-rays of the Cambridge painting show that the lower position of the arm had been tried there. There is an unfinished version, or study, with the raised hand but many other differences, now in the Akademie der bildenden Künste in Vienna (illustrated here). This is believed by some to be by Titian, but for others "the uncertainty of form and anatomy makes it likely to be the work of an assistant or pasticheur".

== Provenance ==
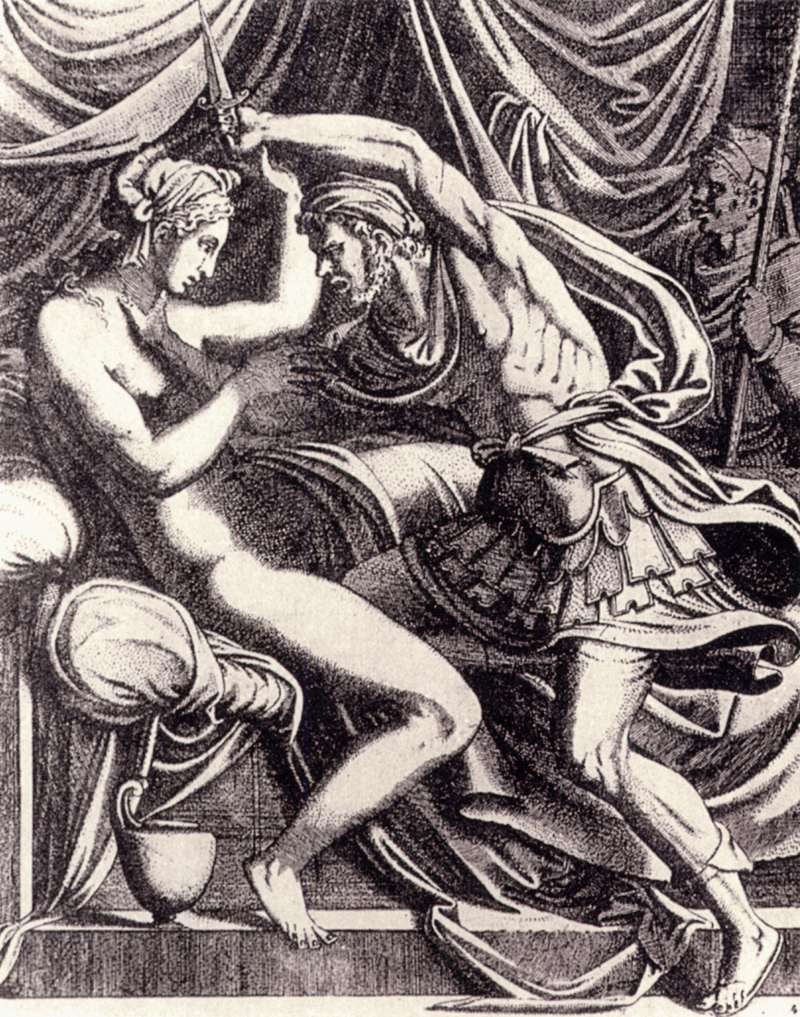
Léon Davent, etching, 1540s (?).

Like many of the paintings of his last years, it was a commission for Philip II of Spain, and was ready for collection by the Spanish ambassador to Venice by August 1571. Titian's own title, from a letter, is Lucretia romana violata da Tarquino ("Lucretia of Rome raped by Tarquinius"). It remained in the Spanish royal collection until 1813, when it was taken to France by Joseph Bonaparte, Napoleon's older brother, after he lost the Spanish throne. It probably accompanied him to America from 1817 to 1832. After his death in 1844 it was sold in London in 1845, and after several private owners, it was given by Charles Fairfax Murray to the Fitzwilliam Museum in 1918. It was frequently back on the market before this, sold in all six times, probably because of its shocking power. Murray had bought it in 1886, and sold it by 1911, then bought it again.

== See also ==
- List of works by Titian
