= Great Synagogue of Florence =

Orthodox synagogue in Florence, Italy

- Italian: Tempio Maggiore Israelitico di Firenze
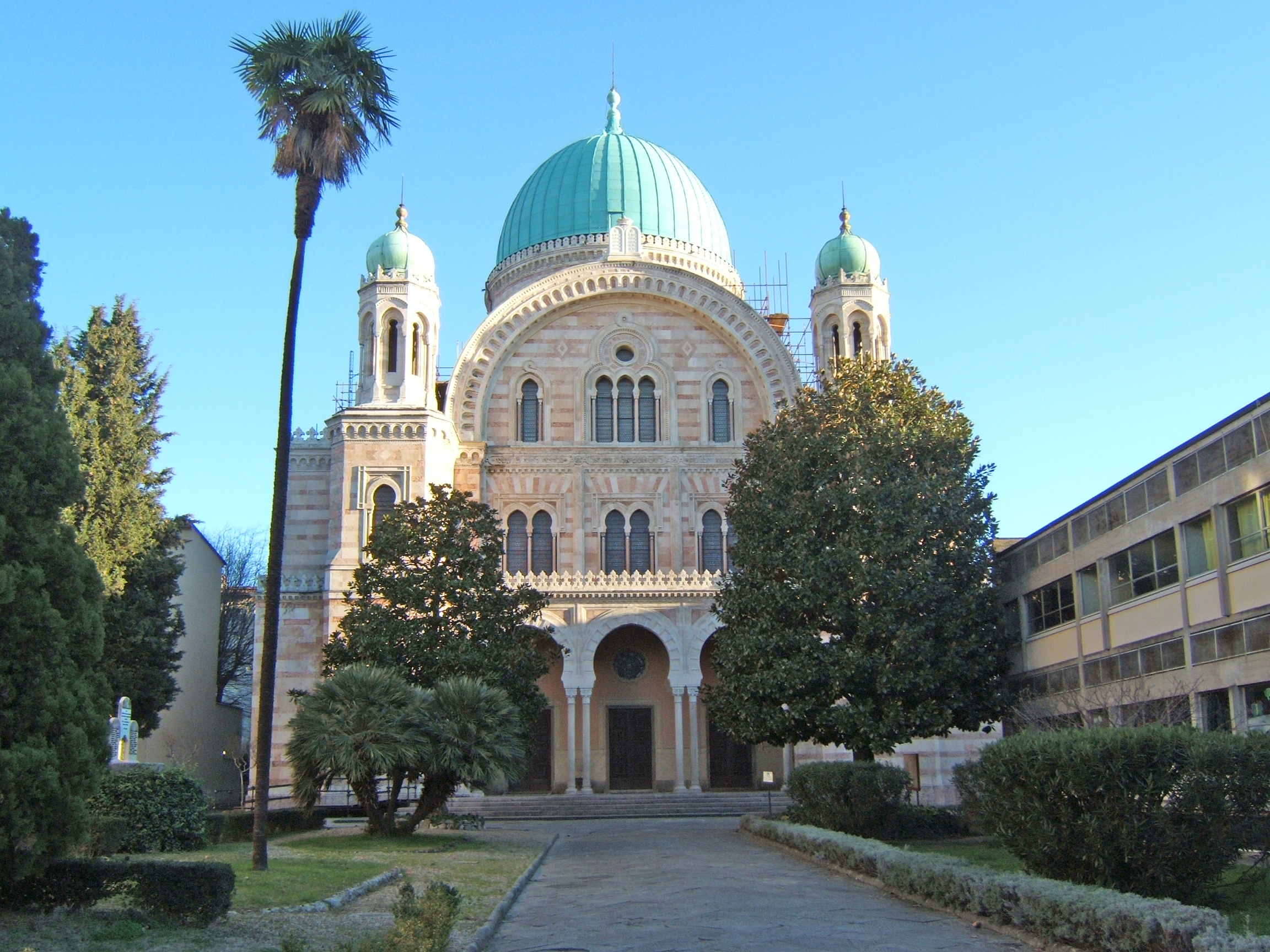
- The synagogue in 2008

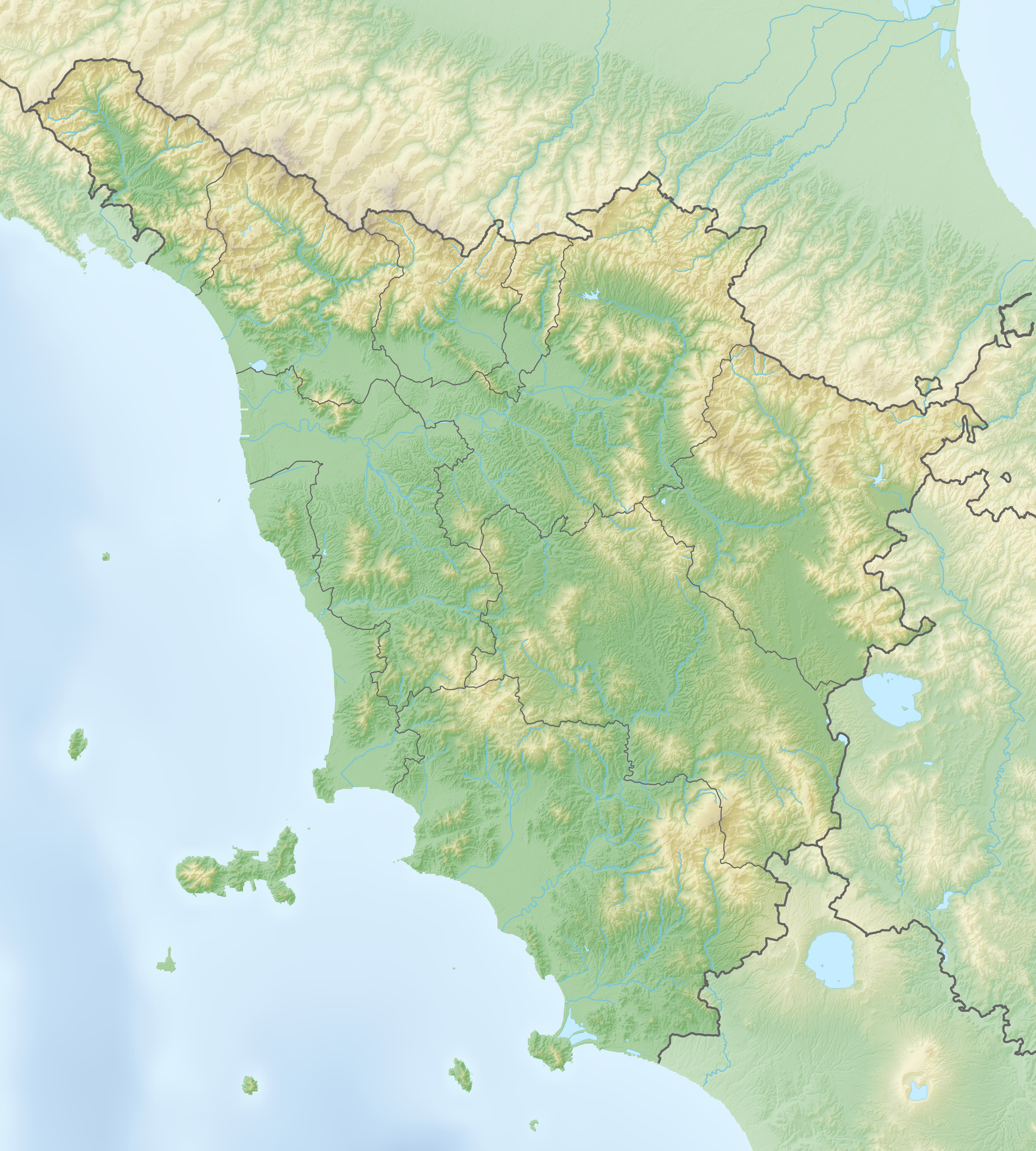
- Location of the synagogue in Tuscany

Religion
- Affiliation: Orthodox Judaism
- Rite: Sephardic
- Ecclesiastical or organisational status: Synagogue
- Status: Active

Location
- Location: Via Luigi Carlo Farini 4, Florence, Tuscany
- Country: Italy
- Coordinates: 43°46′22″N 11°15′59″E

Architecture
- Architects: Mariano Falcini; Vincente Micheli; Marco Treves
- Type: Synagogue architecture
- Style: Italian and Moorish Revival
- Established: 1848 (as a congregation)
- Groundbreaking: 1874
- Completed: 1882

Specifications
- Dome: Three
- Materials: Brick

Website
- jewishtuscany.it

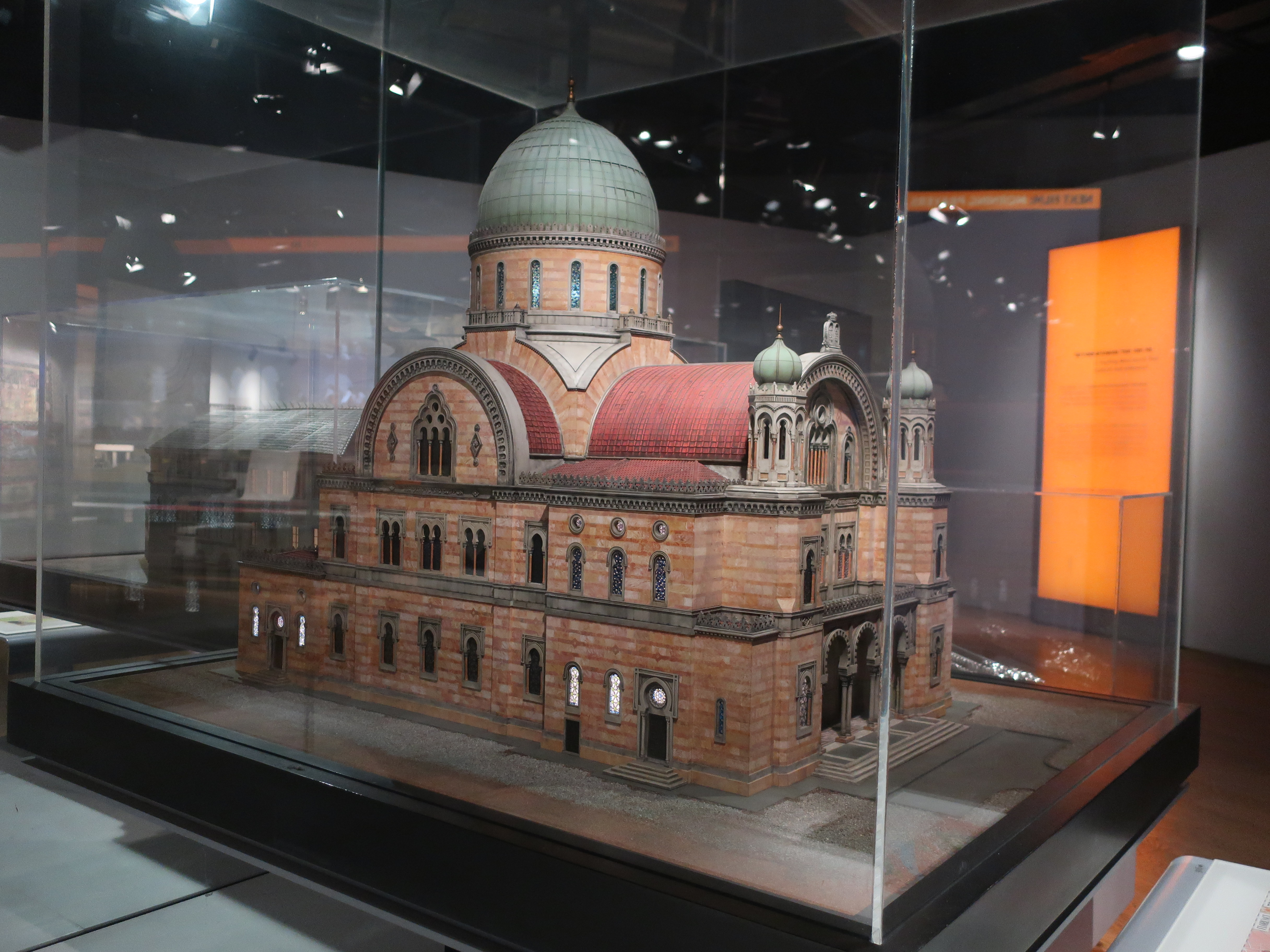
Great Synagogue of Florence

The Great Synagogue of Florence (Italian: Tempio Maggiore Israelitico di Firenze) is an Orthodox Jewish congregation and synagogue, that is located at Via Luigi Carlo Farini 4, in Florence, in Tuscany, Italy. Designed in the Italian and Moorish Revival styles, the synagogue was completed in 1882.

The synagogue is one of the largest in south-central Europe and was one of the most important synagogues built in Europe in the age of the Jewish emancipation, reached by the Jewish communities living in the Grand Duchy of Tuscany in 1848.

The Jewish Museum of Florence is located inside the synagogue.

== History ==
In 1848, in the Grand Duchy of Tuscany, Jews were granted full civic equality. The community began to consider building a new synagogue to symbolize this change, but it was only later that they were able to raise the funds required for such a project. David Levi, a president of the Jewish community, bequeathed his estate after his death in 1870 to build a new synagogue. The 'Israelitic Temple' was built between 1874 and 1882.

During World War II, Nazis occupied the synagogue, using it as a storehouse. In August 1944 retreating German troops worked with Italian Fascists to lay explosives to destroy the synagogue. However, Italian resistance fighters defused most of the explosives and only a limited amount of damage was done. The synagogue was fully restored after the war. Like many other buildings, it suffered damage after the flood of the River Arno in 1966, but another restoration was undertaken to correct the damage.

The Jewish community in Florence comprises approximately 1,400 people. It has a long history, dating from the medieval era. In addition, a nearby Jewish community in the Oltrarno area, south of the Arno river, dates to the Roman era. Jews had a community in Rome since before the Common Era. The first synagogue in Florence was most likely built in the 13th century.

The Great Synagogue of Florence has been widely admired and is a major tourist attraction. It is possible to visit the synagogue on every day, except on Saturdays.

== Architecture ==
The architects were Mariano Falcini, Professor Vincenzo Micheli, and Marco Treves, who was Jewish. Their design integrated elements of the Italian architectural tradition with Moorish decorative motifs. The Moorish Revival style was considered particularly suitable for a synagogue, as it was not used for churches and evoked the Islamic architecture of medieval Spain, a visual idiom often associated with Sephardic Jewish heritage, that is, the Jewish communities of the Iberian Peninsula before their expulsion in 1492.

Layers of travertine and granite alternate in the masonry, creating a striped effect. Old photographs show bold red and beige stripes, but the bold colors of the stone have faded over time, leaving a more mottled effect.

The overall plan of the synagogue is quadrangular. The central dome raised on pendentives is reminiscent of the Hagia Sophia in Istanbul, which was built as a Byzantine church, and many mosques were inspired by it. The corner towers are topped with horseshoe-arched towers, which have onion domes in the Moorish Revival style. Three horseshoe arches form the main entrance, above which rise tiers of ajimez windows, with their paired horseshoe arches sharing a single column. The natural copper roof was oxidized to green so that it would stand out in the Florentine skyline.

Inside the building "every square inch is covered with colored designs," in Moorish Revival patterns. The interior mosaics and frescoes are by Giovanni Panti. Giacomo del Medico designed the great arch.

== Replicas ==
- The 1922 Beth Am Synagogue (formerly Chizuk Amuno), (Baltimore, Maryland) is of similar scale and character, using a number of design elements from the Great Synagogue.
- The 1894 Second Luxembourg Synagogue was built as a replica of the Great Synagogue.

== Gallery ==
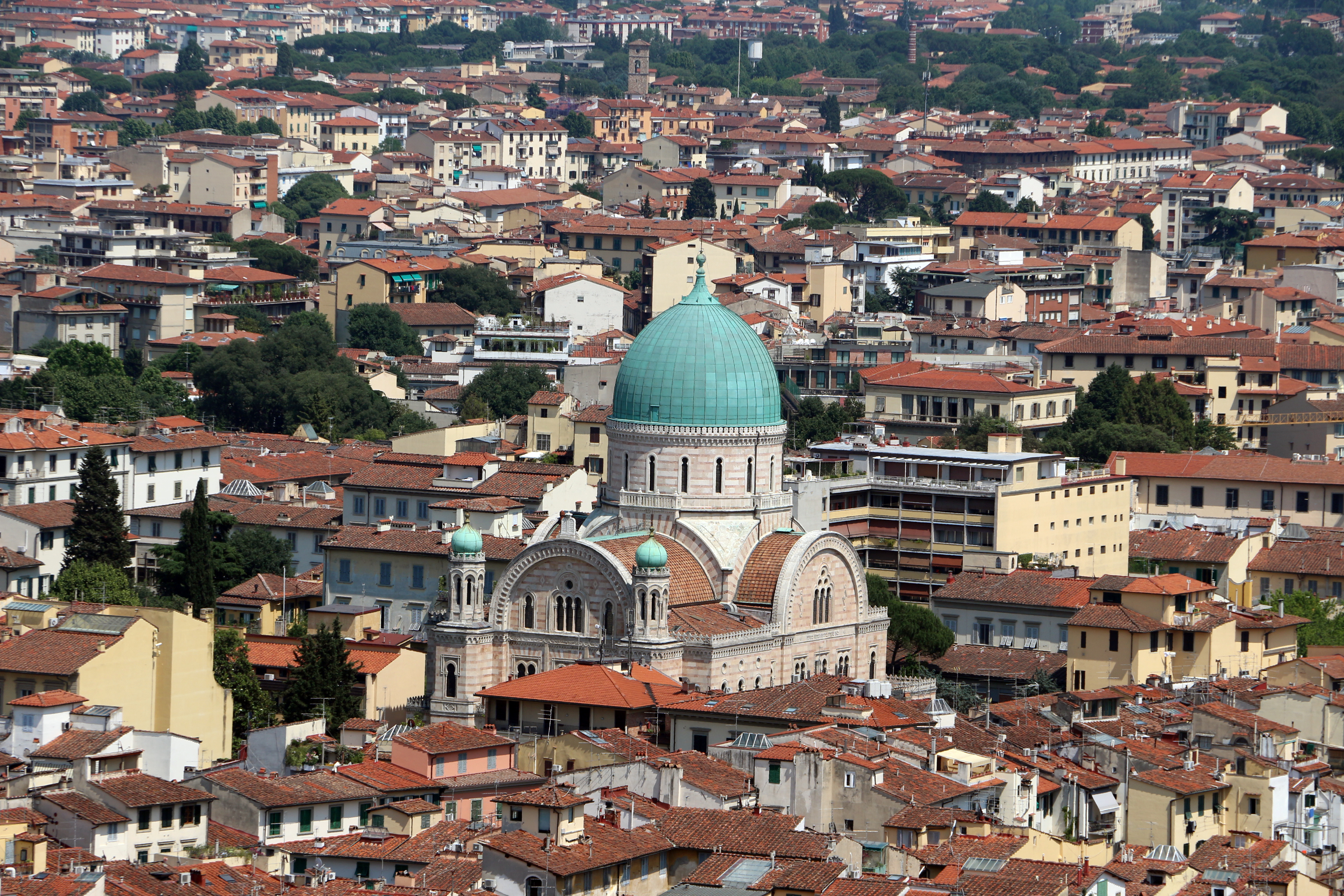
Aerial view

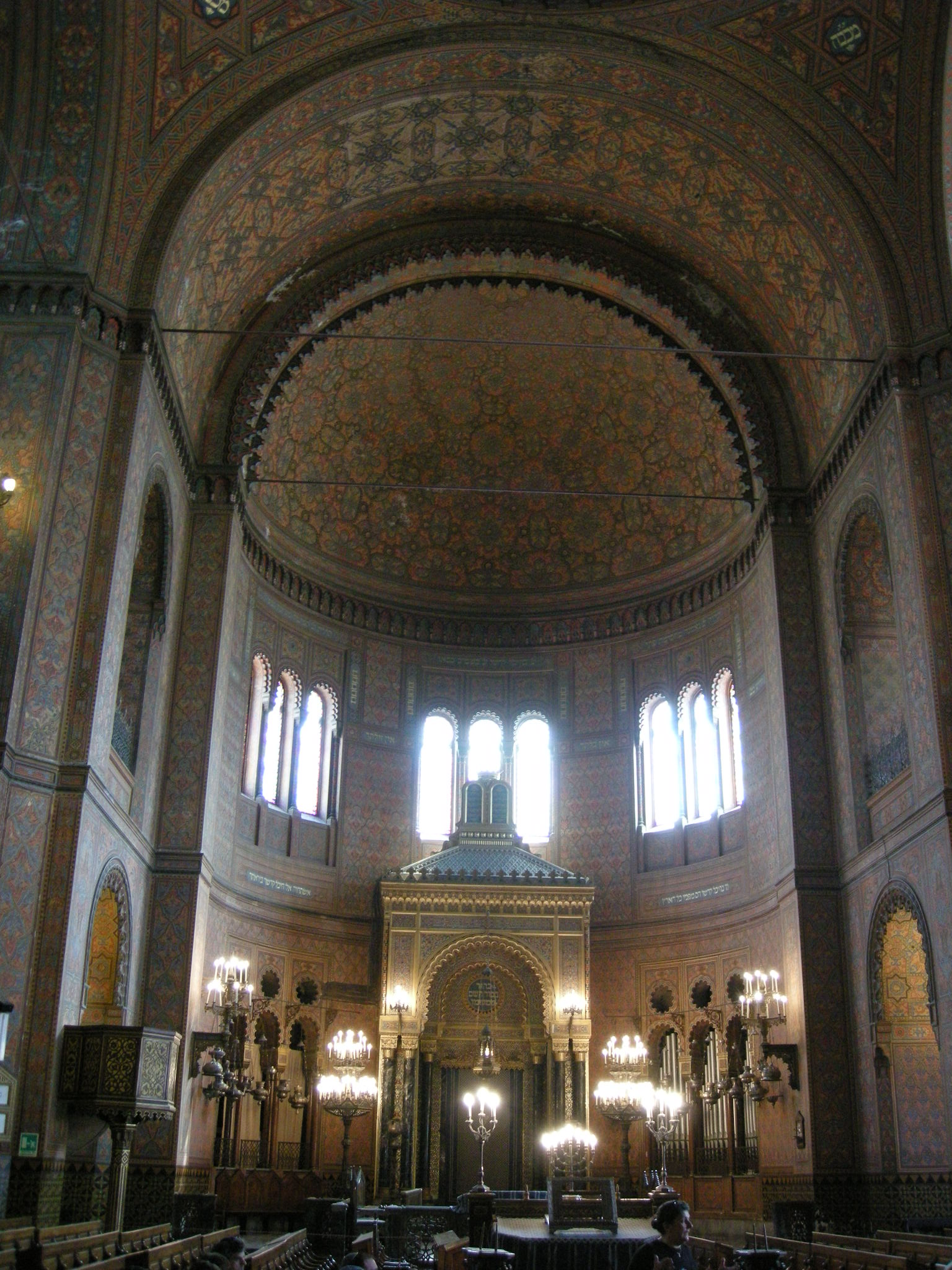
Interior

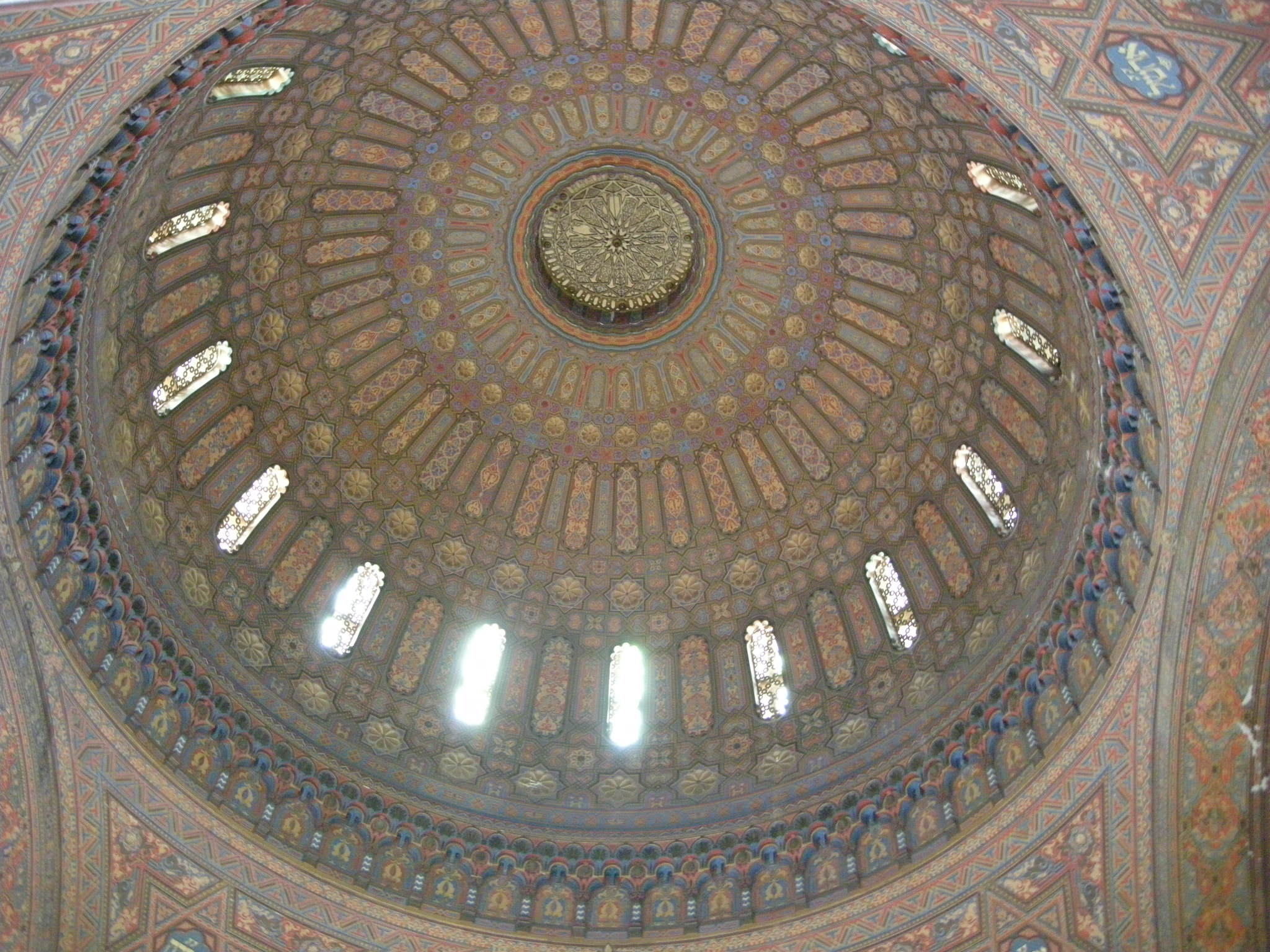
Dome of the synagogue

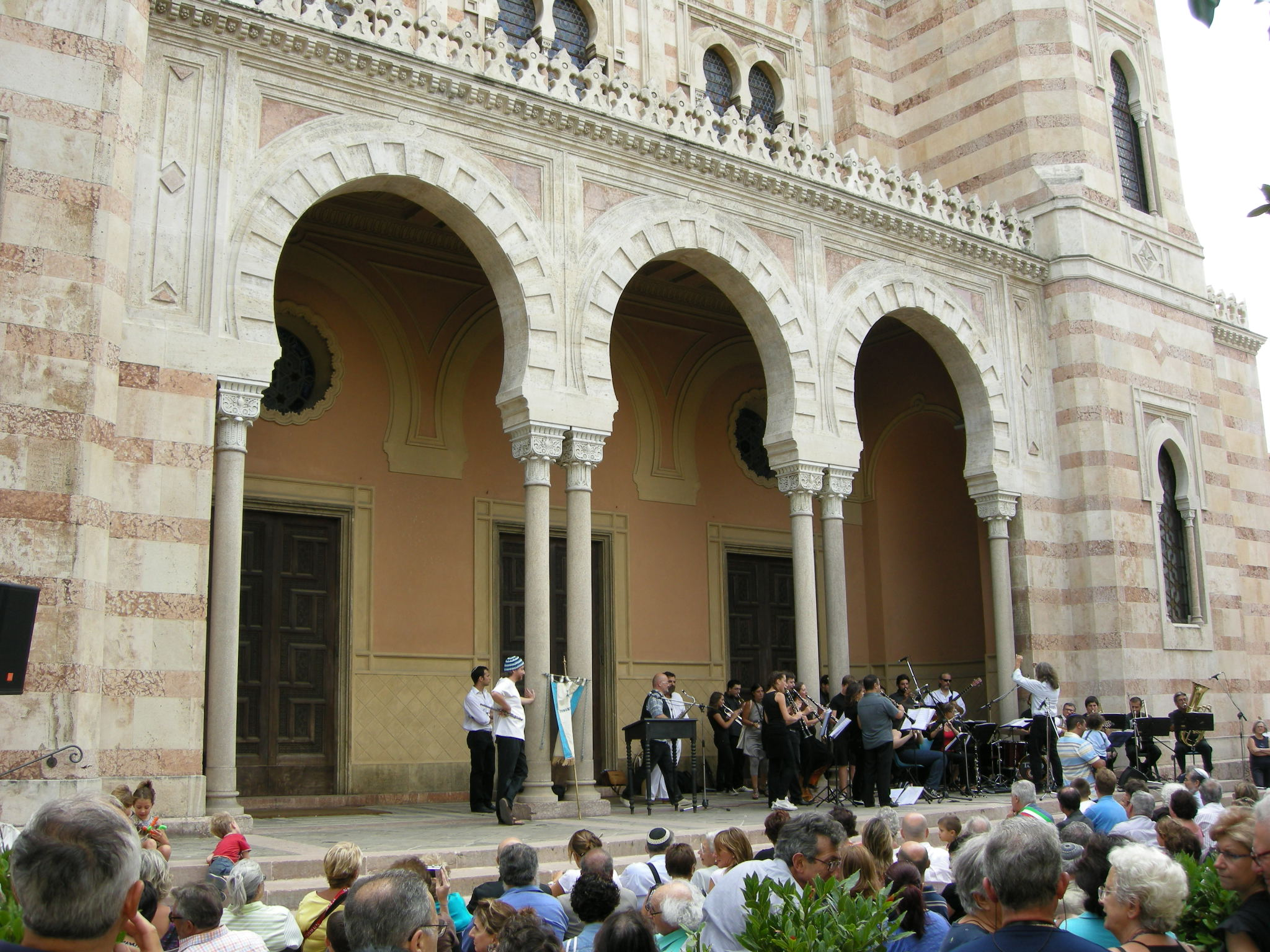
Main entrance

The domes of the Great Synagogue of Florence and the Cathedral of Santa Maria del Fiore side by side

== See also ==
- History of the Jews in Florence
- List of synagogues in Italy
