= Jewish Museum of Florence =

Jewish history museum in Italy

Coordinates: 43.77322°N 11.26573°E

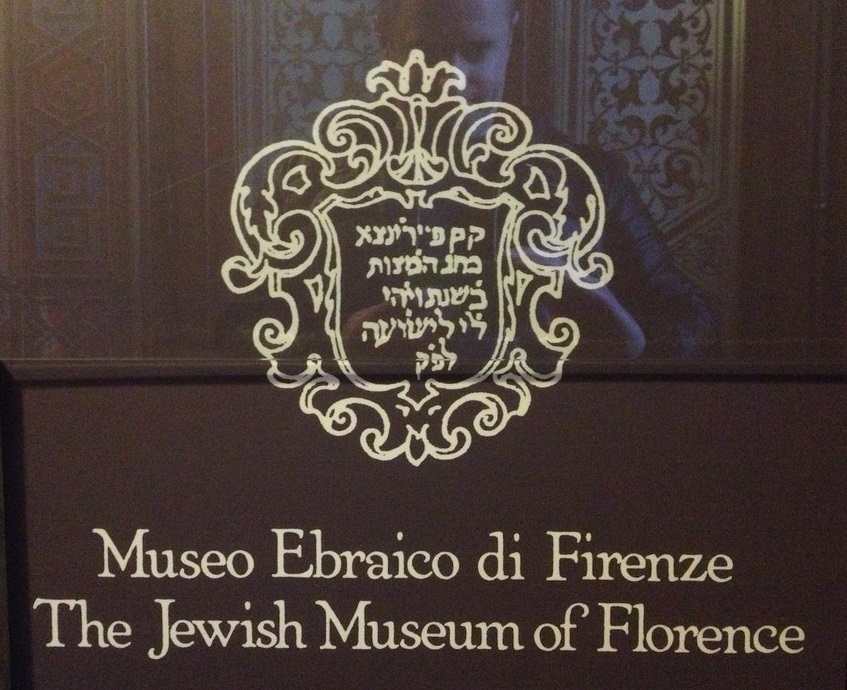
Entrance inscription, Jewish Museum of Florence

The Jewish Museum of Florence (Italian: Museo Ebraico di Firenze) is a museum of Jewish history located in the Great Synagogue of Florence, Italy. The museum, which covers two spaces of the building, gathers an important collection of ancient objects of Jewish ceremonial art, evidence of the high artistic level achieved by the Jewish-Italian communities in the field of applied arts. Exhibitions illustrate the history of Florentine Jews from the first settlements to the post-war reconstruction, featuring old photographs, films and a large number of objects of daily and commemorative use.

== Description ==
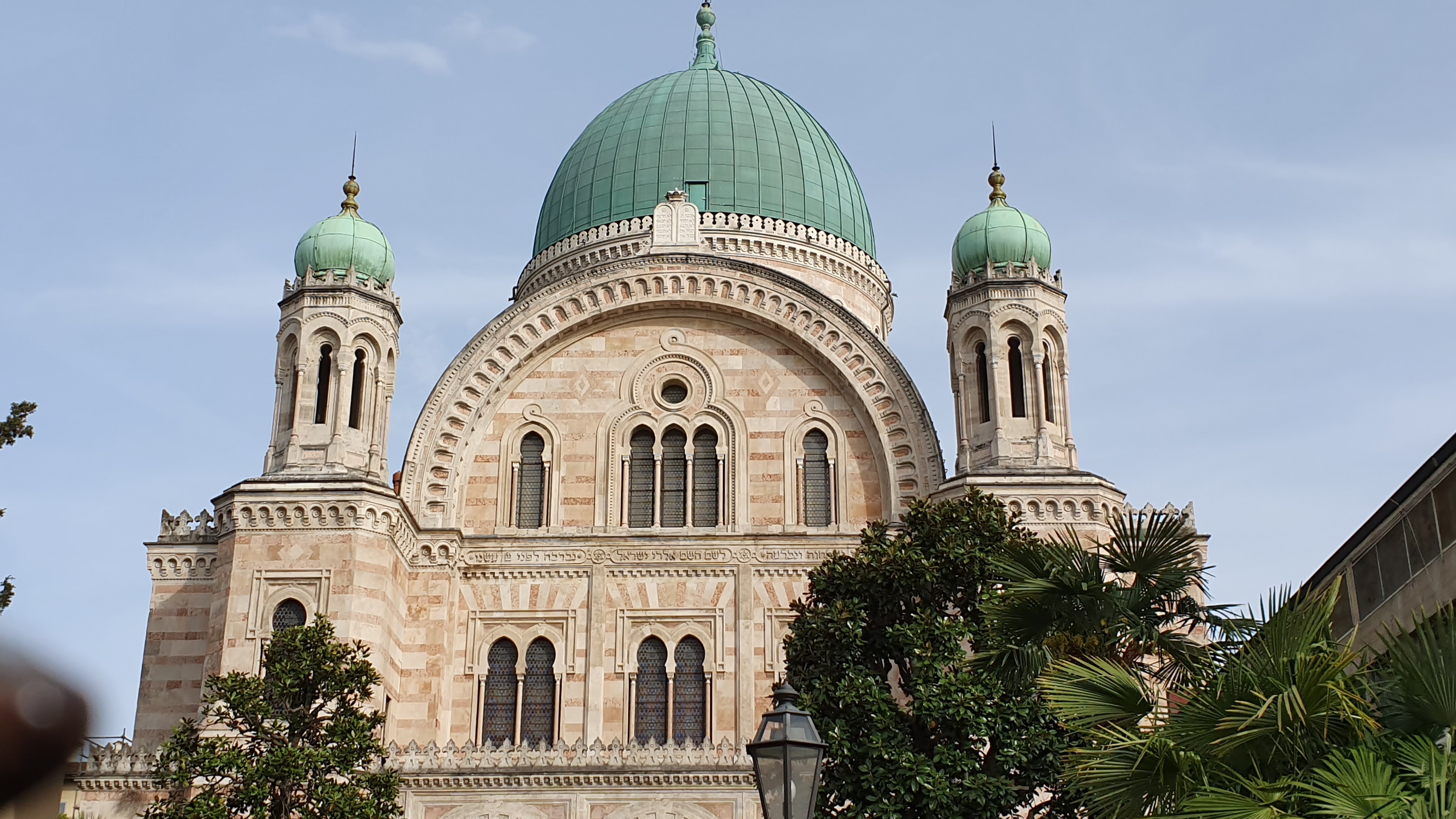
The Great Synagogue of Florence

The Jewish Museum occupies two spaces in two separate floors of the Great Synagogue. The first opened on the first floor in 1981 (thus considered the year the museum opened) as a community initiative called "Friends of the Jewish Museum of Florence", with exhibits offering a historical overview of the Jewish community of Florence and its relations with the city. A photo collection documents the main sites of Jewish congregation in Florence with replicas of the Buonsignori Map and of the ancient ghetto, among others. It also includes a collection of old furniture and ritual objects which were used during religious services, as well as pieces of textiles and jewellery dating from the 16th century to the early 18th century.

The second floor opened after the museum's expansion in 2007, and contains objects and furniture related to the most significant events in Jewish life, family rituals, and religious festivities. There is also a space dedicated to the memory of the Holocaust, with images projected on the back wall. All spaces lead to a computer area, where visitors can connect with other museums and Jewish centres around the world for research purposes.

Museum guides accompany visitors through the complex, providing them with information, insights and anecdotes about local Jewish culture and heritage. Exiting the museum, visitors can access the museum store or rest in the garden area.

== Events ==
=== Open House ===
Every September, the Great Synagogue, and therefore the Jewish Museum, celebrates the Open House Day, open to the public as part of the European Day of Jewish Culture. In 2010, the Open House attracted more than 60.000 visitors, showcasing masterpieces of Jewish artists, and allowing access to parts of the building normally closed to the public.

== See also ==
- Great Synagogue of Florence
- Jewish Museum of Rome
- Museum of Italian Judaism and the Shoah
