= Florentine Ghetto =

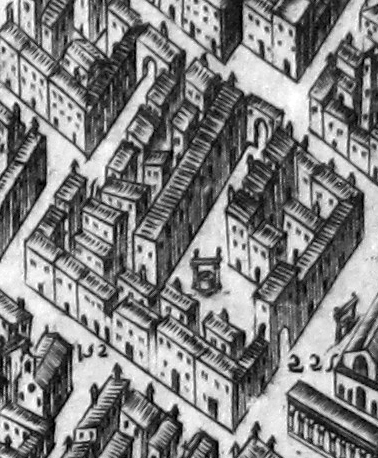
The "old" Ghetto on the map of Buonsignori (1594)

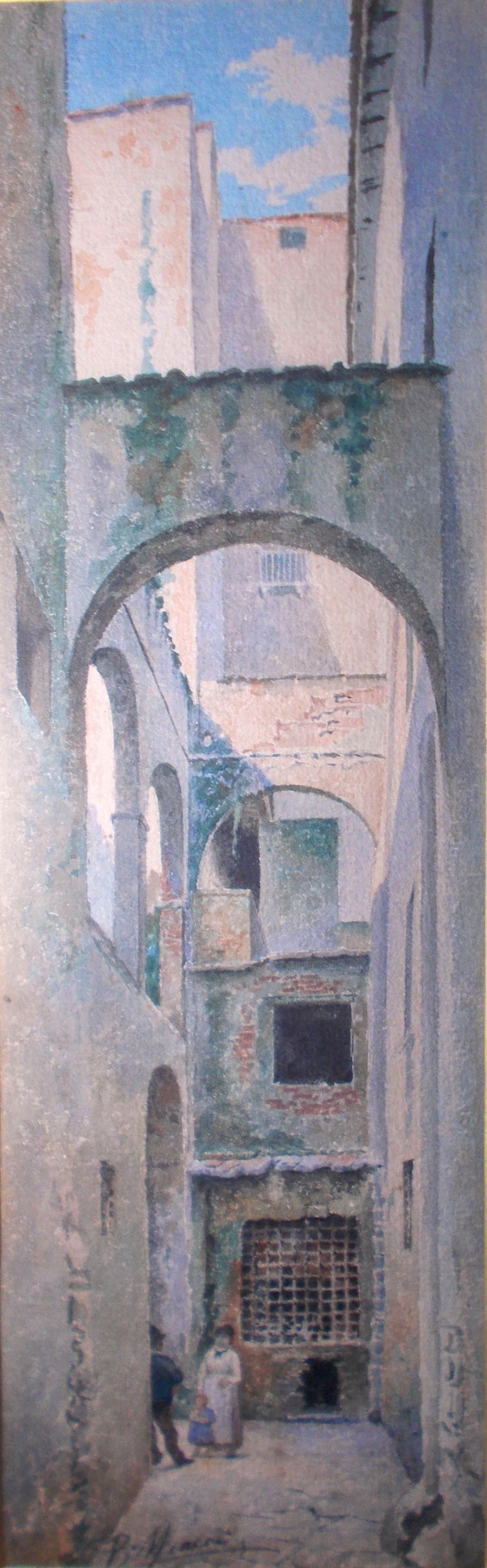
Vicolo in the old Florentine Ghetto (acquarello by Ricciardo Meacci, c. 1888).

The Florentine Ghetto, which was created and constructed by the Medici family in 1571, became the location of refuge for all Tuscan Jews that were previously living around that region. The Ghetto was intended to act as a business venture for the Medici family, and it had no intentions of attempting to force Jews to convert to Christianity. Although life for Jews in the Florentine Ghetto was at times rough due to economic circumstances and constant degradation from non-Jews, it was considered a much less violent and hostile environment than other Ghettos that formed around Italy before and after. The Florentine Ghetto was technically active for 264 years.

== Role of the Medici family in the creation of the Florentine Ghetto ==
Giovanni Medici, along with his son Cosimo the Elder and grandson Piero the Gouty, rose in society from simple shopkeepers up to international bankers. The Medici family consistently involved themselves in government affairs, again slowly moving further and further up the totem pole of politics. The Medici family arrived in Florence to a city in political and social shambles; the city itself was in the midst of conflict with many of the cities and towns surrounding it. Generation after generation went by as the Medici family continued to overpower and take over rival empires with similar goals in mind. It did not take long before the Medicis became the superior power of the territory around Florence. The Medici estate that was built in Florence grew to become almost twenty times the space that the Jewish Ghetto came to occupy. A Medici Grand Duke by the name of Francesco I became a co-founder of the Florentine Ghetto.

== Creation of the Ghetto ==
The Florentine Ghetto was officially developed in 1571 by the Medici family as a private real estate endeavor. The ghetto was constructed on the basis that rent would be set high to draw high profits on the investments. The purpose of the Ghetto was not to attempt to convert the Jews to Christianity. Many people who follow Western Christian ideals have been led to believe that the Jews were moved into a ghetto specifically in this area because the land had been known as having been previously inhabited by prostitutes and whores. The majority of Jews that came to live in the Florentine Ghetto were arriving from one of the previously dissolved Medici settlements. For the Medici family, the creation of the Florentine Ghetto was considered just another business deal in which they took advantage of the Jews by forcing them into bidding wars for the small and cramped properties that were made available in the Ghetto.

Before the creation of this Ghetto, there had been almost no presence of Jews in Tuscany, except for the higher class. On a sign over the Florentine Ghetto which read "segregate but not expel", which is an important aspect to the reasoning of the Medici family behind the creation of the Ghetto; they aspired to make as much possible income off of the Jews as possible while creating as little of an economic and social interruption between the Jews and Christians of Florence. Because the Ghetto is seen as more of a business venture than anything else, it was built less through a natural process of economic shifts and changes in demographics and more through the Jews dire need to relocate after the fall of other Medici settlements. Refugees from over twenty towns relocated into the Florentine Ghetto almost involuntarily, which is why the creation of the Ghetto is said to have been built "artificially".

=== Ghetto structure ===
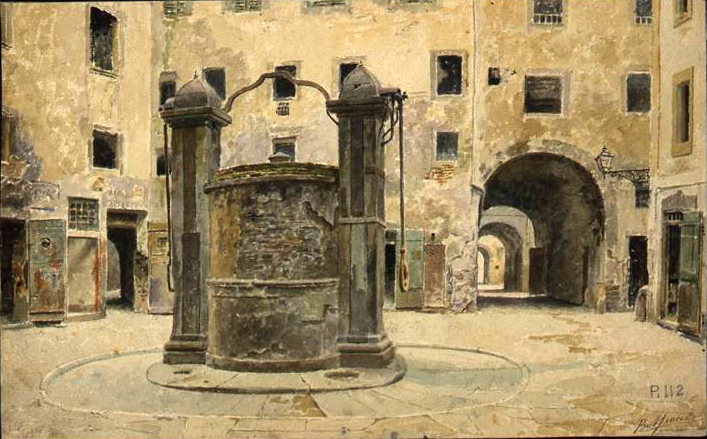
Piazza della Fonte, the heart of the former ghetto, in a watercolour by Riccardo Meacci. On the right, the vault that overlooked the Via del Ghetto

The Florentine Ghetto itself, which was made up of almost 500 men, women, and children, was constructed in the center of the Tuscan capital. It consisted of a piazza (center place) and a narrow street that was enclosed by gates that shut every night. The population of the Ghetto comprised less than 1% of Florence's total population of around 60,000. Geographically, the Ghetto was just north of the Mercato Vecchio, which became a positive attribute later on for the many Jews who were involved in trading. Physically, the Ghetto did not look much different than any other nook in a large city, except for the large gates at either end. The physical appearance of the Ghetto was intentionally created to show that the presence of the Jews in that area was merely insignificant to the people on the outside. "The Ghetto was designed to be seen as simultaneously powerful, functional, and unobtrusive." Cosimo I of the Medici, who was mainly responsible for the Ghetto's construction, emphasized the importance of the Jews working with the commerce within their own enclosed area while still remaining inconspicuous to those who were not living there.

== Life in the Ghetto ==
=== Physical markers ===
Soon after the creation of the Ghetto, the Medici decided that an effective way to distinguish between Jews and non-Jews of Florence was to not only segregate the Jews but by force them to wear physical markers that further set them apart from the people living outside of the Ghetto's gates. The branding that the Jews were subjected to differed between males and females; males were required to wear hats made out of any yellow fabric at all hours of the day, while females were required to wear shirts with yellow right sleeves. The implications of Jews not abiding by these "dress code" rules were high. However, many Jews chose to accept the risks of not following these laws because of the vast difference in treatment that they received by non-Jews under different physical circumstances. Some Jews, however, were able to find loopholes in the dress code system. For example, a Jewish banker named Prospero Marino requested and petitioned to wear the yellow cap by claiming that it hindered the success of his business activities. "The yellow badge was certainly a sign of Jewishness – but even more, it was a sign of poverty and powerlessness." For the majority of Jews in the Florentine Ghetto who were forced into wearing this segno, ("sign" or "mark"), soon approached a multitude of difficulties when it came to establishing themselves in the world of commerce because of how hesitant non-Jews were to implementing business relationships with them.

=== Interaction with non-Jews ===
Although the Ghetto as a physical entity within the city of Florence was blocked off by gates, this did not originally deter Christians and Jews from intermingling for social or economic purposes. "No permission was needed for Jews to leave it or for Christians to enter it" As time went on, life for Jews in the Florentine Ghetto became more difficult in terms of their ability to sustain relationships with non-Jews (especially in the general social sense - which was known as conversazione) thanks to laws passed by Jewish authorities in 1608 and 1620. The first law outlined that no one living outside of the Ghetto could attend any type of festivities that were happening on the inside unless invited formally by the host of the event. The latter prevented Jews from taking part in even the most mundane social activities with non-Jews, like eating, drinking, and gambling. Similar to the punishments that Jews incurred for failing to wear the yellow badges, punishments for Jews who decided to be involved in sexual relationships with non-Jews were public humiliation and jail time.

=== Political affairs ===
Once the Jews arrived in the Ghetto in 1571, the Medici provided them with a reasonable amount of freedom to manage their political affairs. Two magistrates were in charge of overseeing all of these affairs inside the Ghetto: The Nine Preservers of the Florentine Dominion and Jurisdiction and The Eight Magistrates for the Protection and Supervision of the City of Florence. Within the Ghetto, only a limited number of men were given the freedom to represent themselves in the political sphere, by attending meetings, being allowed to vote, and being given the ability to hold positions in office. However, for the majority of men and women were not given these types of political representation in the Ghetto or beyond. The chosen people that were given the right to political representation within the Florentine Ghetto had the job of acting as spokesmen for the rest of the Ghetto community that had no voice.

Social status for men in the Ghetto was largely determined by age, with provenance and lineage following close behind. Men who came from wealthier families had the political advantage of being able to run for governor earlier than men from middle-class families. The role of the governor involved having the authority to write laws and make decisions in the best interest of the Ghetto. Jews who served in the Ghetto government were looked upon with a special status in the eyes of the rest of the Ghetto population.

=== General life ===
Although the Florentine Ghetto was not nearly one of the worst ghettos to live in at the time, the everyday living conditions were still not favorable. Tensions were often high between Jews living in the Ghetto because of the high amount of intra-community competition that occurred for the Jews to get through each day. Author and scholar Edward Goldberg claims that "tensions often boiled over, and sometimes the police had to take notice – but for every Ghetto incident that came to trial, many others certainly did not." Another large factor that contributed to the often petty fights between Jews was that the Ghetto itself was so small and enclosed. The tensions among Jews were even sensed at times among Christians, highlighted in Goldberg's book where she writes "Even the Christian magistrates could sometimes feel the tension building, then erupting at night after the gates of the Ghetto were shut". Because the Jews, unlike Christians living outside the Ghetto, were always highly suspected of moral and general wrongdoings, they easily developed inferior reputations for partaking in the same misdemeanors as their Christian counterparts. Despite Jews in the Ghetto having high ambitions for their employment opportunities, (and be qualified for these positions), they often found it difficult to succeed in becoming anything other than just a merchant or trader because of their religious affiliation. (Goldberg ?) The Jews in the Ghetto were not a wealthy group. According to their status in the guilds, most of the Jewish men in the Ghetto fell into the lower ranks of membership, and if their incomes were comparable to those of other artisans, they probably earned between 20 and 40 scudi.

=== Practice of faith ===
Luckily for the Jews of the Florentine Ghetto, there was already an official synagogue built for them upon their arrival in 1571 and later. This synagogue was one of the more beneficial aspects of the Ghetto; it served as a helpful method for many Jews who were struggling to reassimilate into a completely new area and lifestyle. Benedetto Blanis, a Florentine Jew who documented much of his time in the Ghetto through letters written to Don Giovanni dei Medici, once wrote concerning the hardships of religion in the Ghetto, "As you also know, the room is where I do my preaching every Saturday. The courtyard in question is very small, measuring roughly 4 braccia [7.65 feet], and they set out tables there, so there is much insolence from drunken and impertinent people and much scandalous behavior". While Blanis in this letter was hoping for more space for casual prayer, most Jews could just rely on the main Ghetto synagogue, also called the scoula or sinagoghe, for more organized prayer. In terms of its physical appearance, the synagogue was extremely plain and inconspicuous, which was considered a stark contrast to the lavishly decorated churches that the Christians living just outside the Ghetto were used to. An important aspect of the Ghetto's synagogue, which made it similar to synagogues established in other areas, was the emphasis on separation of the sexes during prayer. The scoula was not only a place of worship, however. Because of its central location within the Ghetto, the synagogue also acted as a pseudo "town hall", where laws were formed, bids on properties were made, leaders were elected, and other official businesses were conducted. "Not only was the scoula a place of prayer and reflection, but it was also the seat of Ghetto government and the nexus of local power and prestige".

=== Economy ===
The Jews that lived in the Florentine Ghetto were restricted to the jobs that they could uphold, which in turn immensely affected their abilities to succeed in breaking the lower-middle class barriers that were in place for them. Economic activity within the Ghetto consisted almost solely of the selling of crafts and commerce in small shops. The Ghetto was geographically situated close to the Via dei Rigattieri, also known as the Street of the Second-hand dealers. Similar to this street, the Ghetto became known for its merchants selling scraps and second-hand products. To the benefit of Jewish shopkeepers, the Ghetto was also conveniently located in the middle of the Mercato Vecchio, which was one of Florence's largest and most populated markets. As a result of its location, the Ghetto became "an integral part of the city's shopping district - or so it seemed to the Christian bargain hunters who dropped in during business hours to buy things on the cheap." Despite the obvious benefits that this situation poses, the Jews were still underwhelmed with their limited options in terms of occupations, especially during this time where the Ghetto was extremely straining on allowing the Jews to live a high quality of life.

== Abolition ==
The gates of the Florentine Ghetto, which served to keep Jews and Christians out, began to lose their function around 1755. Authorities that were in charge of inspecting the gates at midnight slowly stopped doing so. Around this time, the official obligation for the gate to be closed at midnight ended, however, the Jews of the Ghetto still chose to perform this duty themselves for around 80 more years. On June 9, 1779, Jacob Bassano of Livorno, Angelo di Vita Finzi, and the two Rimini brothers David Salomone and Moisè Vita of Florence, who were the highest bidders, bought the Florentine Ghetto for 34,584 scudi. Although the Ghetto was purchased in 1779, the Jewish Council (Consiglio Israelitico) decided to officially stop closing the Ghetto gates at midnight in 1834. This action led to protests of Jews living in the Ghetto, who were apprehensive about their only source of protection for the schools, shops, and homes no longer being enforced. In the Jewish Council's memorandum on the issue, it mentioned that "though it was the need to cut expenses, including the doorkeeper's salary, they also claimed the Jews' right to abandon a custom that recalled periods of humiliation and shame." Approximately one year after the Jewish Council decided to stop closing the Ghetto gates, in 1835, the gates became permanently attached to the side walls of the Ghetto. The Florentine police had no objections to this action, and at that time, the Florentine Ghetto officially ceased to exist.

== Contributions to Jewish development ==
The Florentine Ghetto was more than just a relocation of a group of people from one Medici empire to another. The presence of the Ghetto had a significant impact on the economic and political state of not only the Jews of the time but also the Jews to come. Literary scholar Stefanie B. Siegmund described the impact of the Ghetto as "an event which both symbolically and quite literally shifted and redefined the boundaries between Jews and Christians". When the Jews became emancipated in Italy, they witnessed all of their previous traditions, including the restrictions that came with them, disappear completely as they were replaced with more modernized traditions that better reflected the Jews' shift in their roles in society. After its abolition, the ghetto system became remembered as a lifestyle that was methodical and conventional in every aspect of life: economically, socially, religiously, and legally. "The birth of the ghetto as a place of enforced habitation, one of the aberrations of the modern era, paradoxically was also a catalyst for the development of Jewish ceremonial art in Italy".

== See also ==
- History of the Jews in Florence
- Jewish quarter (diaspora)
- Jewish ghettos in Europe
- Ghetto
- Piazza della Repubblica, Florence
- Florentine Ghetto Mapping Project @Medici Archive Project
