= Buonsignori Map =

The Map.

The Buonsignori Map (Italian - Pianta del Buonsignori or Carta del Buonsignori) was an axonometric map of the city of Florence, produced as an etching in 1584 and later reissued in 1594. It was drawn by and named after the Olivetan monk Stefano Buonsignori, etched by Bonaventura Billocardi and edited by Girolamo Franceschi. One of the 1594 copies belongs to the Museo di Firenze com'era and hangs in the local history rooms at the Palazzo Vecchio.

Its full Latin name is Nova pulcherrimae civitatis Florentiae topographia accuratissime delineata (New map of the fairest city of Florence, the topography most accurately delineated).

Buonsignori was official cartographer and cosmographer to Francesco I and Ferdinand I. He produced the map from using the view from his monastery on Monte Oliveto, a viewpoint also used by the older Pianta della Catena. The first edition of 1584 was dedicated to Francesco I and the 1594 edition included several new constructions, such as the Fountain of Neptune, the Equestrian Monument of Cosimo I in piazza della Signoria and the first fortifications of what would become the Belvedere.
