= Carceri (band) =

Dutch death metal band

- Origin: Delft, Netherlands
- Genres: Death metal, extreme metal
- Years active: 1999–present
- Labels: Armada Productions
- Members: Kees de Vlieger; Rogier van Kleef; Josha Nuis; Ivar Useinov; Yoram Danneleit
- Website: Carceri

Carceri is a Dutch death metal band from Delft, Netherlands, formed in 2000. The band comprises vocalist Kees de Vlieger, guitarist Ivar Useinov and Yoram Danneleit, bassist Rogier van Kleef and drummer Josha Nuis. Carceri released a debut album, The Good Must Suffer The Wicked, in 2011 via Armada Productions. In 2012 the band played at Neurotic Deathfest and toured as opening act on the Reborn of Death 2012 tour with Suffocation, Blood Red Throne, Cattle Decapitation, Sadist and Cerebral Bore in the UK, Ireland and France.

== History ==
Carceri formed in 2000 in Delft, Netherlands. In 2003, the band released a self-titled demo containing 5 tracks recorded at Excess Studio's in Rotterdam.

== Musical style ==
I'll say it straight away: LABELS, WAKE UP!! Holy Mother of Christ on a donkey! Carceri can easily compete with the big guys in death metal. The influences of especially Suffocation and Monstrosity (the final riff in "Destroy His Name" could easily have been featured on In Dark Purity) are obviously present but nevertheless Carceri can absolutely not be called a rip-off of these bands. The five band members show their skills perfectly. Ultra tight drumming by drummer Joshua and bassist Rogier allows both guitarists Vincent and Ivar (who does an awesome lead job as well) to rise above themselves after which vocalist Kees' finishes it all off with his heavy and filthy vocals.

— Michiel B., LordsOfMetal

Metalrage.com commented, of the band's debut album, "Carceri started with playing death metal in the nineties, recorded one demo and finally released their first album in 2011. What you get is top notch technical death metal, the brutal way. Without triggers the band gives us eight songs that are full of creativity, awesome metal solos and brutal blast beats."

== Members ==
- Kees de Vlieger – vocals (1999–present)
- Ivar Useinov – guitars (1999–present)
- Yoram Danneleit – guitars (2012–present)
- Rogier van Kleef – bass guitar (1999–present)
- Josha Nuis – drums (1999–present)

== Past members ==
- Vincent de Corte – guitars (1999–2012)

== Discography ==
- The Good Must Suffer The Wicked (2011)
