= Stefano Bonsignori (cartographer) =

Italian cartographer (died 1589)

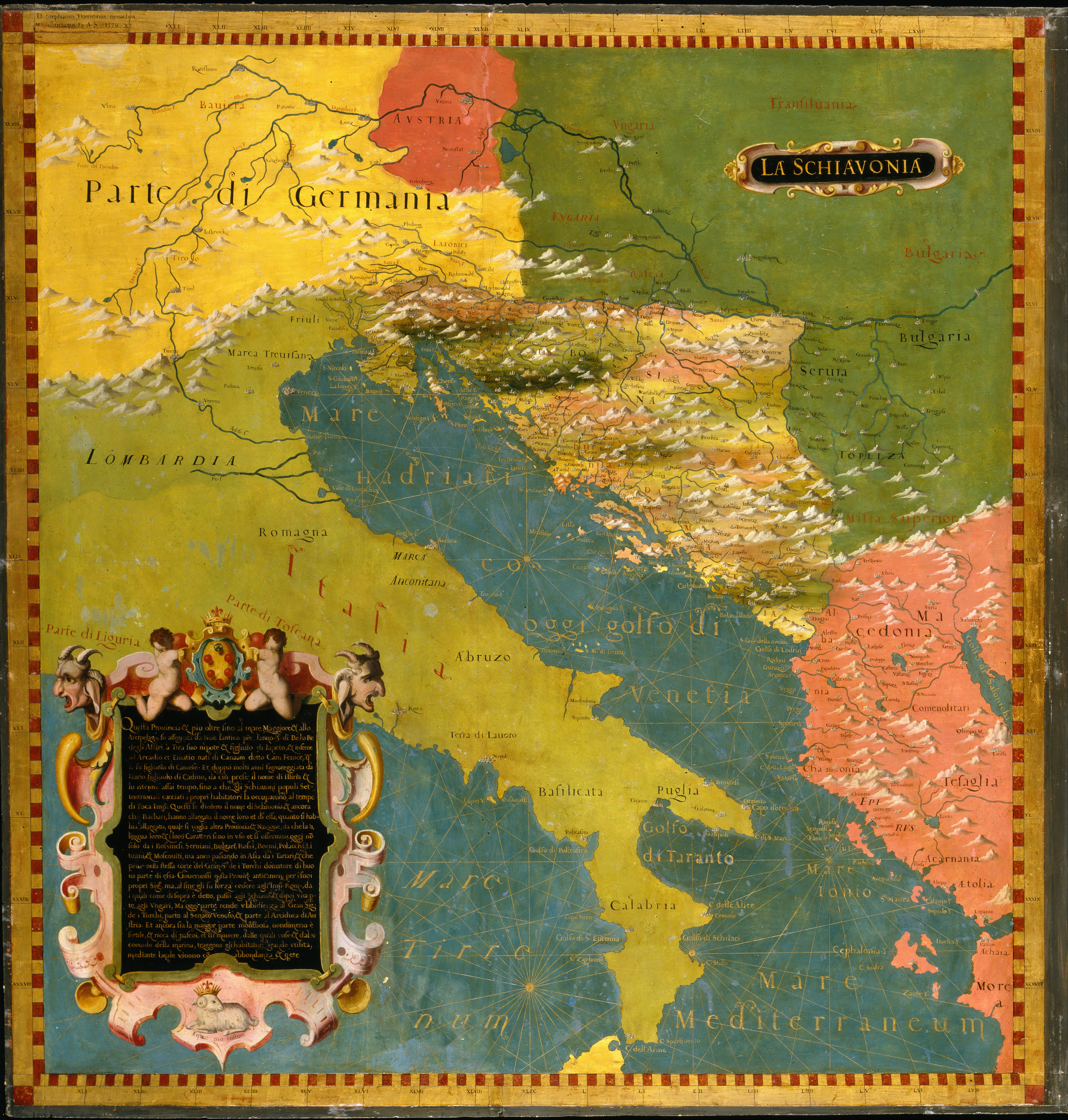
Map by him in the Palazzo Vecchio in Florence.

Stefano Bonsignori or Buonsignori (died 21 September 1589, in Florence) was an Italian Olivetan monk and cartographer to Francesco I, Grand Duke of Tuscany. He was born in Florence and is most notable for his eponymous Bonsignori Map of Florence.

== Biography ==
Little is known about Bonsignori's life before he came to be in the service of the Medicis. He was born in Florence and became part of the Olivetan monastic order before being invited in 1575 to become Francesco's cartographer.

According to a letter sent to the superior of his congregations, the Grand Duke intended to entrust him with the completion of the cycle of maps for the Guardaroba (cloakroom) in the Palazzo Vecchio, which remained unfinished after the dismissal of Ignazio Danti. Of the 53 cartographic panels painted on the doors of the cloakroom, 23 are by Bonsignori, with the most recent one being from 1589.

His famous axonometric map of Florence was created under the patronage of Francesco between 1576 and 1584 and etched by Bonaventura Billocardi. The prominence of the Arno River and the detailed depiction of a variety of often quite minor water-related structures is telling of the way in which water management had been an important aspect of the policies of Francesco's father, Cosimo I, whose achievements had transformed the city's landscape.

In 1588 his role as Grand Ducal cartographer was confirmed by Francesco's successor, Ferdinando I.

Stefano Bonsignori died in 1589 and was buried in the church of Santi Michele e Gaetano, but his tomb disappeared during the seventeenth-century reconstruction of the building.
