= Carceri di Sant'Ansano, Siena =

Medieval building in Tuscany, Italy

Coordinates: 43.31448°N 11.328202°E

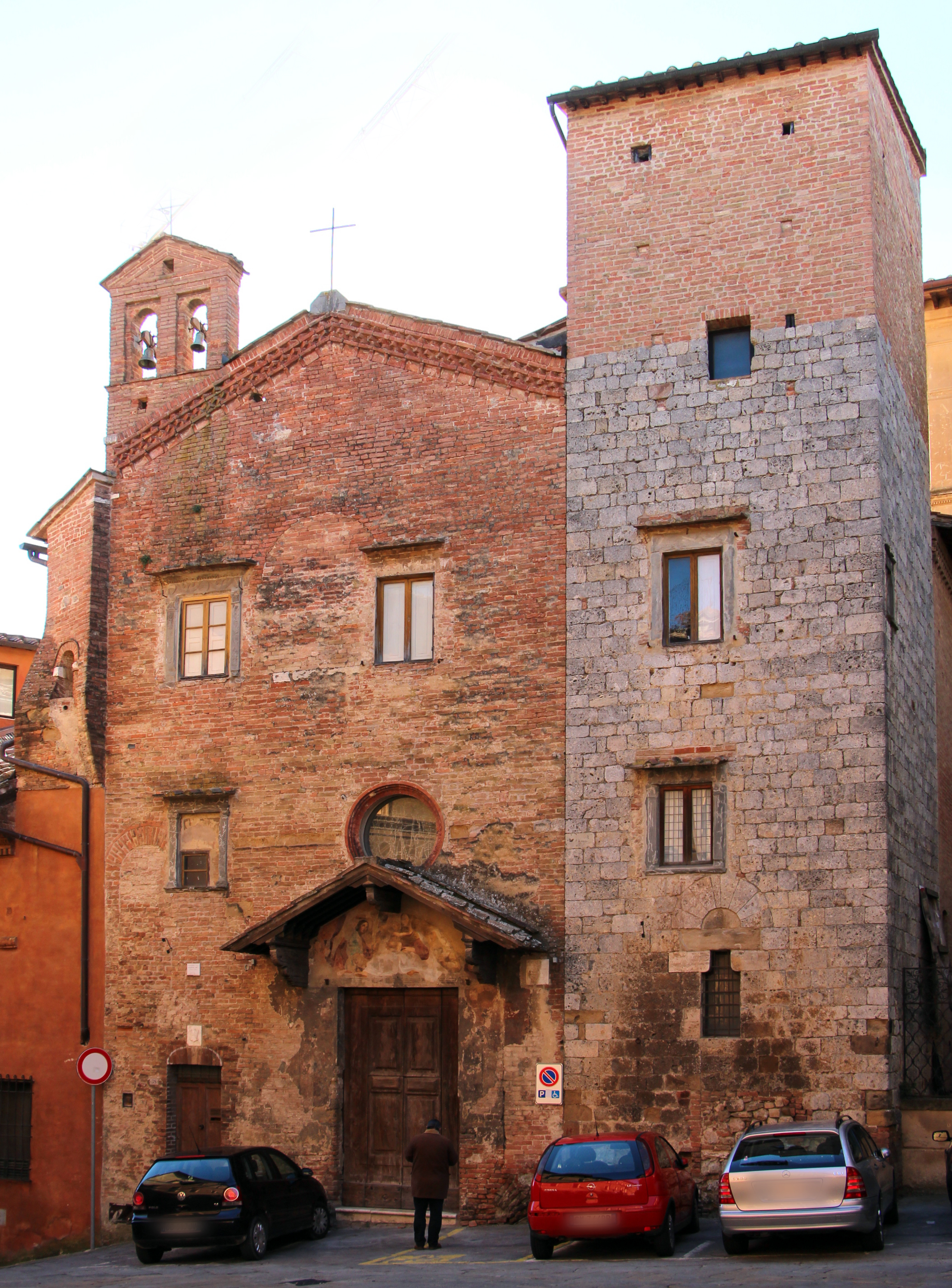
Carceri di Sant'Ansano, Siena

The Church of the Jail of Sant'Ansano, Italian: Chiese delle Carceri di Sant'Ansano, also known as the Chapel or Oratory of Sant'Ansano in Castelvecchio, is a small, medieval, Roman Catholic religious building located on via Tommaso Pendola in the Terzo di Città of the city of Siena, region of Tuscany, Italy. Adjacent to the tower is the former Istituto Santa Teresa.

== History ==
The church or oratory was built in 1444 and consecrated in 1448. The design of the church is attributed to Pietro da Minella. The church was used as an oratory for the Contrada of the Turtle (Tartuca) until 1663. The brick exterior remains asymmetric and unfinished with some round windows walled up.

Over the entrance portal is a retouched fresco depicting the Madonna and Child with Saints Ansano and Caterina da Siena by Francesco Rustici. The oculus above the door has a 17th-century stained glass depicting the saint.

Inside there are some remains of 14th-century frescoes. The main altarpiece depicts the Martyrdom of Sant'Ansano also by Francesco Rustici. His father Vincenzo Rustici painted canvases with God the Father and an Annunciation.

There are a number of other sites dedicated to Sant'Ansano in the province, including a chapel in the cathedral, a sanctuary where he was buried, and a chapel where he escaped death by boiling.

== Legends ==
Legends hold that Sant'Ansano, also known as Sant'Ansano Battista or the Baptist, was jailed in the adjacent tower, which now serves as the bell-tower for the church. Sant'Ansano, venerated as one of the first to convert local pagans to Christianity, while in jail, was said to have continued to baptise many locals from the low window in the tower. However a problem with the story is that the tower likely dates from the 13th century, hence was unlikely to have existed as such during the 4th-century rule of Diocletian during which Sant'Ansano was martyrdom.

Sant'Ansano's martyrdom was equally legendary. He was taken outside of the city to be boiled in oil, near the town now called Sant'Ansano, but remained unscathed. From there he was taken to a site near the city, a district called Dofana, where he was decapitated. Each site has churches, sanctuaries or chapels for the saint. He is considered, along with Savino, Crescenzio, and Vittore, one of the four original patron saints of Siena, though their veneration would falter with the addition, over time, to the patronal canon of St Catherine of Siena and San Bernardino of Siena to the roster of local patrons.
