= Ricciardo Meacci =

Italian painter

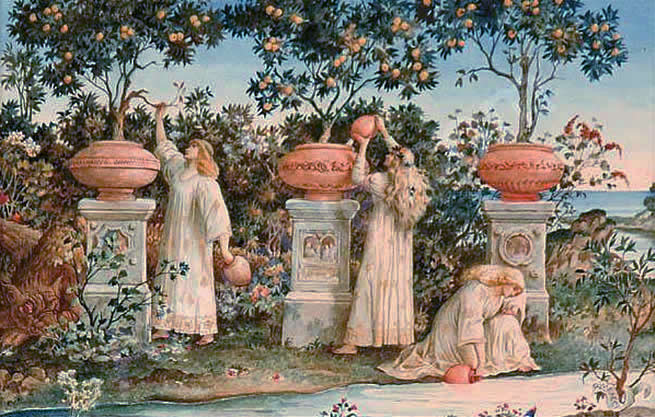
"The Garden of Hesperides" by Ricciardo Meacci

Ricciardo Meacci (5 December 1856 – 15 January 1938) was an Italian (Sienese) painter from the school of "Purismo" who came under the influence of the "Pre-Raphaelite" movement. He received several commissions for mural paintings, examples of which survive in the grand buildings of his native city of Siena. He is more widely-known, however, for his compressed but florid watercolour and gouache images of Christian devotional subjects, and moralized, allegorical scenes upon classical and romantic themes, original in composition but making reference to the Sienese quattrocento. These formal paintings, often conceived as triptychs, were cased in ornamental frames of modelled plaster, gilt, and applied pilaster arcading, and with openwork carving or finials, combining techniques and materials after the manner of the Arts and Crafts movement. For such works he had patrons among the royal houses of Europe, and examples are in the British Royal Collections. His watercolour studies of architectural corners and spaces in Venice and Florence are populated by incidental figures in daily costume.

== Life ==
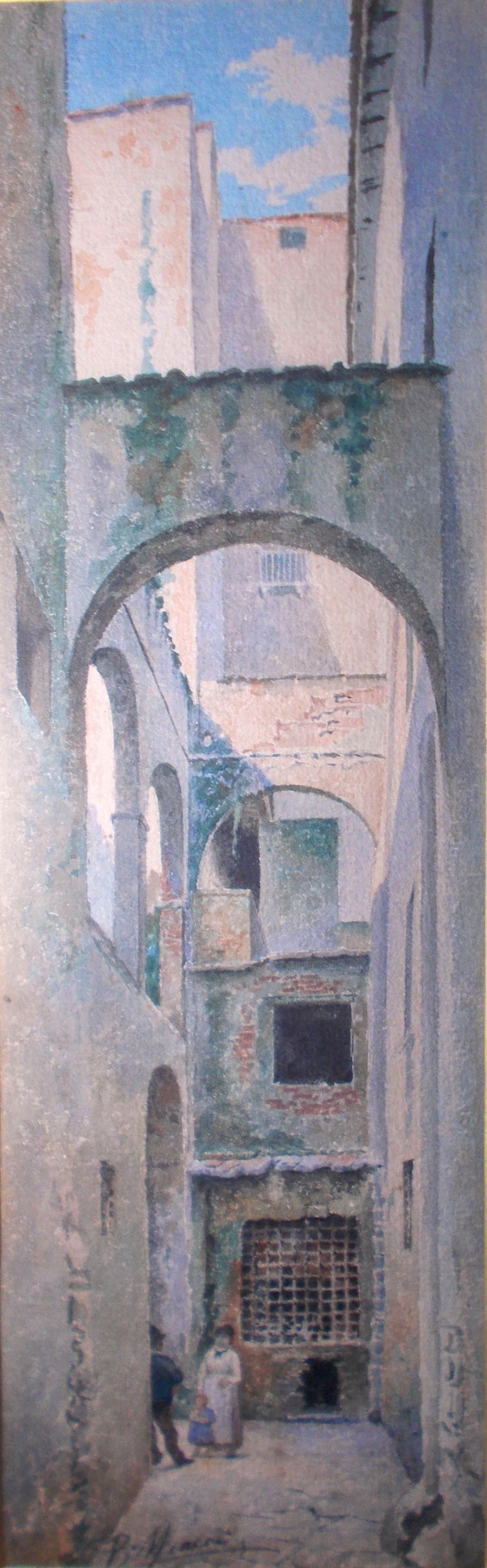
Vicolo in the old Florentine Ghetto (watercolour by Meacci, c. 1888)

Born in 1856 in Dolciano, a sector of Chiusi in the Province of Siena, Meacci studied at the Istituto di belle Arti in Siena, where he was a pupil of Luigi Mussini, his art developing in the environment of the Purismo movement. He continued his study of painting in Florence (to which he removed in 1880), in Venice and in Rome. In Florence he came into contact with a group of English artists working in the Pre-Raphaelite manner, and was deeply influenced by them. Meacci collaborated with other Mussini pupils (including Alessandro Franchi, Cesare Maccari, Amos Cassioli and Antonio Ridolfi) in the mural paintings for the Victor Emmanuel II Hall of the medieval Palazzo Pubblico around 1886, after Mussini himself declined the commission.

A.R. Willard, noting that Mussini impressed his Pre-Raphaelite tendencies upon his students (including Franchi), saw in Meacci's work an "almost literal reproduction" of the style of Edward Burne-Jones. The Magazine of Art (1899), however, singled out this statement as showing a complete misunderstanding of Burne-Jones's style. Meacci told Helen Zimmern that his intense interest in the quattrocento artists, and his attempts to master their techniques, was fostered after he left Mussini, by Charles Fairfax Murray. Murray, in fact, had been studio assistant to Burne-Jones in 1867, was a friend and associate of William Morris, and lived in Florence studying north Italian art, working as a copyist for John Ruskin, between 1872 and 1882.

The greater part of Meacci's work is to be found in the churches and mansions of Siena, where it may be seen in the context of the artists from whom he drew inspiration, such as Domenico Ghirlandaio, Perugino or Pinturicchio. His work appealed to English taste, and to royal and aristocratic patrons. First among them was Queen Victoria, for whom he painted at her request "The Marriage", a symbolic representation of the marriage (1894) of the Grand Duke of Hesse-Darmstadt, for a bridal gift: he afterwards painted a companion-piece, "The Christening", at the commission of the Grand Duke, for the christening of his first child. "Our Queen frequently sends to Meacci some of her poetical artistic fancies for his elaboration", wrote Zimmern. Queen Victoria suggested to Meacci the design of a painting in memory of Prince Henry of Battenberg (died 1896), with figures of the angels of Life and Death. At a certain time each year he used to send a picture to the Queen.

He similarly received commissions from the Duke of Connaught and from the Princesses Louise and Beatrice, from Franz I, Prince of Liechtenstein, and other royal persons. Despite this, he lived in great simplicity with his art:

"It is impossible to judge this man by the standard applied to modern painters. His work is of another age and atmosphere: it springs from other ideals and plays upon a chord of whose music in these modern days we are wont only to hear the echo... To gaze at his works, to be in his presence, evokes a sense of withdrawal from the daily life of our own century, with its social questions and its vexing problems. Meacci is not married: he says he has too much respect for women to ask any of the sex to bear with his musty and bygone sentiments and his hermit habits."

A portrait of Meacci by the artist Marius Ledda (1880–1969) was painted in oils in 1921. He died in Florence, and is buried in the Cimitero della Misericordia in Rifredi (a sector of the city of Florence). He was prolific in his output, and many of his works have appeared in the market since the 1960s.

== Examples of works ==
=== Frescos ===
- Allegorie (Allegories, Regions of Italy: Sardegna, Liguria, Piemonte), 1890, frescos. Siena: Palazzo comunale, Sala Vittorio Emmanuele II
- Santi e profeti (Saint Cecilia and Saint Gerolamo Emiliani, and Prophets Elijah and Elisha), 1882–1890, frescos. Siena: Institute of Santa Teresa (Chapel). Also paintings in the two reception halls.
- (with Alessandro Franchi, Gaetano Marinelli and Giuseppe Catani Chiti), a cycle of frescos in the chapel of the Seminario al Chiapetto at San Martino d'Albaro, a district of Genoa (1901–1904).

=== Altarpiece ===
- La consegna delle chiavi a san Pietro (The Presentation of the Keys to St Peter), 1892, Triptych. Siena: Basilica of San Francesco. It was commissioned by sac. Pietro Masi, and the frame is the work of Tito Corsini.

=== Galleries and collections ===
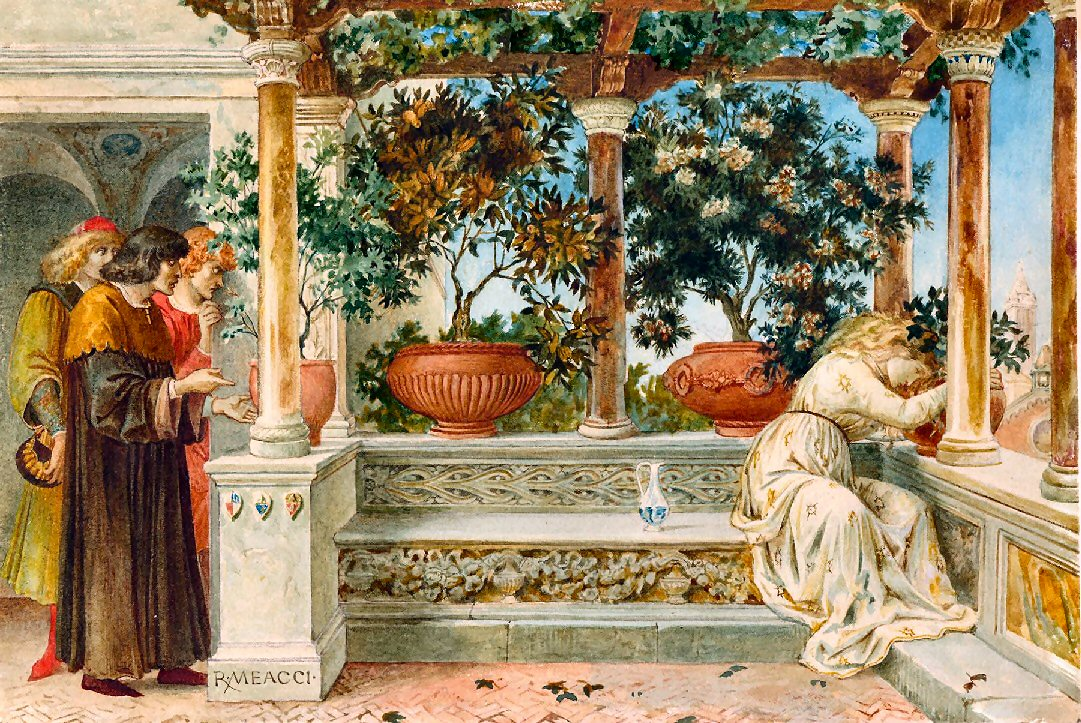
"Isabella and the Pot of Basil" by Ricciardo Meacci

- La morte di Archimede (Death of Archimedes), 1880. Siena: Società di Esecutori di Pie Disposizioni
- Leah, 1882. Siena: Società di Esecutori di Pie Disposizioni
- La via buona e la via cattiva (The Good Way and the Evil Way), 1884. Siena: Società di Esecutori di Pie Disposizioni
- Isabella e il vaso di basilico (Isabella and the Pot of Basil), 1890, watercolour. Private collection.
- The Garden of Hesperides, 1894, watercolour. The National Trust.
- La fontana d'Amore (The Fountain of Love), 1921, watercolour. private collection
- Il matrimonio del duca e della duchessa di York (The Marriage of the Duke and Duchess of York: a symbolic representation), triptych, 1923. Great Britain: Royal Collections
- Gesù appare con la croce a san Pietro (Jesus Appearing with the Cross to St Peter), 1933. Siena: Palazzo del Capitano
- Angels visiting the Infant Christ, Great Britain: Royal Collections
- "I hope to see my pilot face to face when I have crost the bar", Great Britain: Royal Collections

=== From the salerooms ===
- A House Blessing
- Triptych: Madonna and child enthroned, with angels and saints
- Triptych: Procession before a triumphal arch; worshipping at a shrine; balcony with landscape (la corte gioiosa)
- Festeggiamenti a palazzo
- Christ enthroned, St Frances, the fountain of life
- Legend of St George (Final image of four)
- The Pilgrim's Progress
- Primavera
- Triptych: Humilitas, Charitas, Fortitudo
- St Expeditus
- Homage to Florence: Coronation of Flora, with the Duomo and Palazzo Vecchio
- Isaiah, and story of the Nativity, and David, with gifts of the Kings of Araby
- George and the Dragon
- L'Offerta alla patria
- The Story of St Martin
- St Martin dividing his cloak
- Vision of St Hubert
- The Theological Virtues
- The Marriage Ceremony
- Ringraziamento dopo la pestilenza
- La Sacra Conversazione
- Christ on the Cross with St John and St Philip
- The Betrothal

== Sources ==
- G. Pignotti, 'Ricciardo Meacci', in Pignotti, I Pittori Senesi della Fondazione Biringucci (1724-1915) (Giuntini-Bentivoglio, Siena 1916), pp. 195–207.
- G. Mazzoni, 'Ricciardo Meacci', in B. Sani and E. Crispolti (eds), Siena tra Purismo e Liberty (Milano, Mondadori 1988), pp. 186–196.
- E. Spalletti, 'Il secondo Ottocento', in C. Sisi and E. Spalletti (eds), La cultura artistica a Siena nell'Ottocento (Milano, Monte dei Paschi di Siena, Grafiche Amilcare Pizzi 1994), pp. 457–8, 463–4, 471, 495, 508–9, 531, 536.
- F. Franco, 'Meacci Ricciardo', in Dizionario Biografico degli Italiani, Vol. LXXII (Istituto dell'Enciclopedia Italiana, Roma, 2009), at treccani.it.
- F. Franco, 'Opere e notizie inedite su Ricciardo Meacci, un artista della Regina Vittoria', in Bollettino Telematico dell'Arte, (2007)
