= Royal Academy Exhibition of 1880 =

1880 art exhibition in London

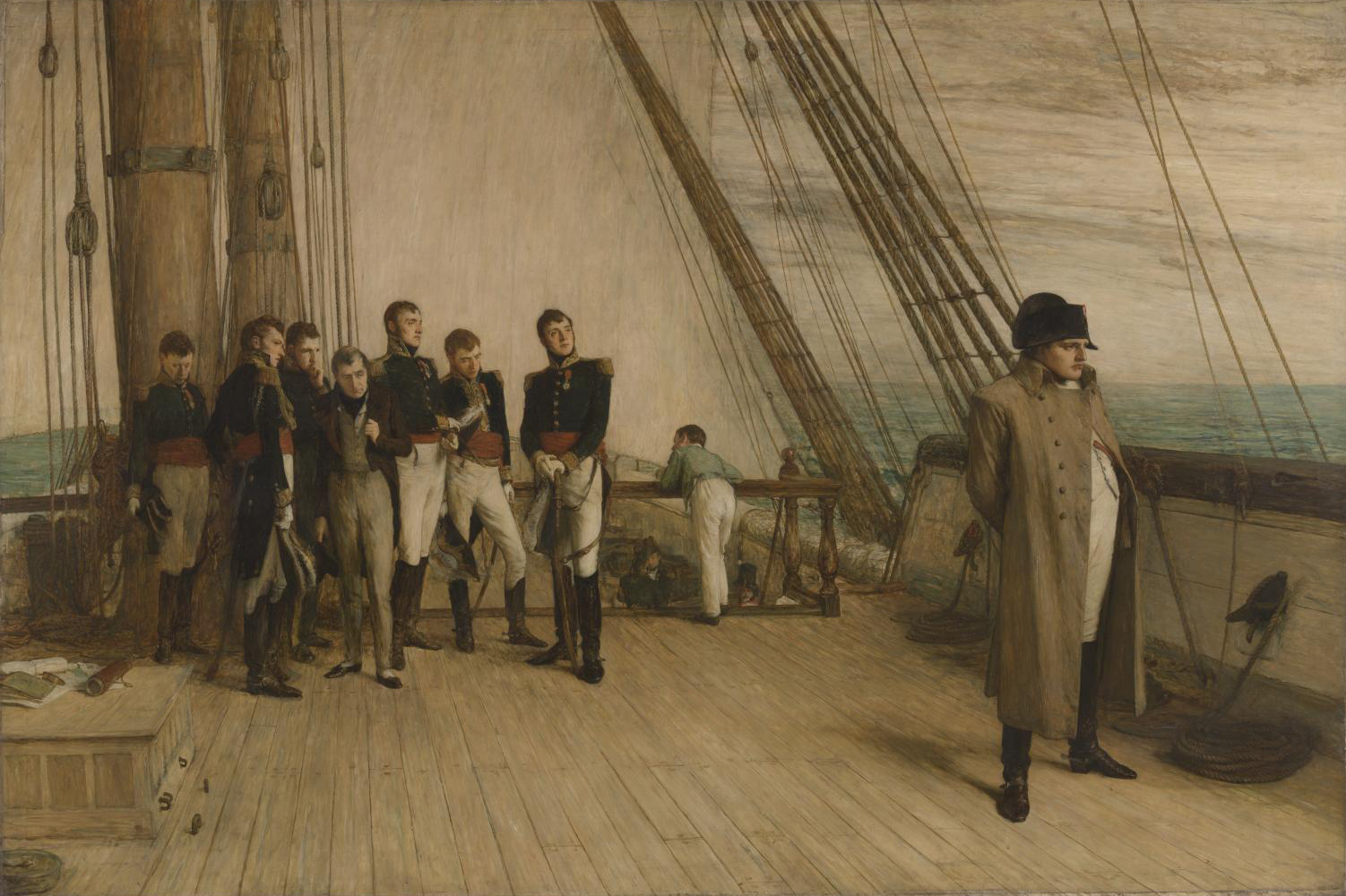
Napoleon on Board the Bellerophon by William Quiller Orchardson

The Royal Academy Exhibition of 1880 was an art exhibition held between 3 May and 2 August 1880 at Burlington House in London. It was the annual Summer Exhibition organised by the British Royal Academy of Arts. It drew around 300,000 spectators and featured submissions from prominent artists and architects of the later Victorian era.

The rivalry between the Academy and the much newer Grosvenor Gallery continued to grow. While a number of artists associated with Impressionism had already exhibited there, this year major artists in the Academic style submitted works to both exhibitions.

The history painting Napoleon on Board the Bellerophon by William Quiller Orchardson and the seascape Britannia's Realm by John Brett received acclaim and were acquired for the nation through the Chantrey Bequest.

Amongst the portraits on display were two self-portraits by John Everett Millais and George Frederic Watts. These has been produced to hang at the Ufizzi Gallery in Florence, a process organised by the President of the Royal Academy Frederick Leighton. Julius Schrader displayed a portrait of the German Chancellor Otto von Bismarck. The French artist Jules Bastien-Lepage exhibited portraits of the Prince of Wales and the actress Sarah Bernhardt.

== Gallery ==
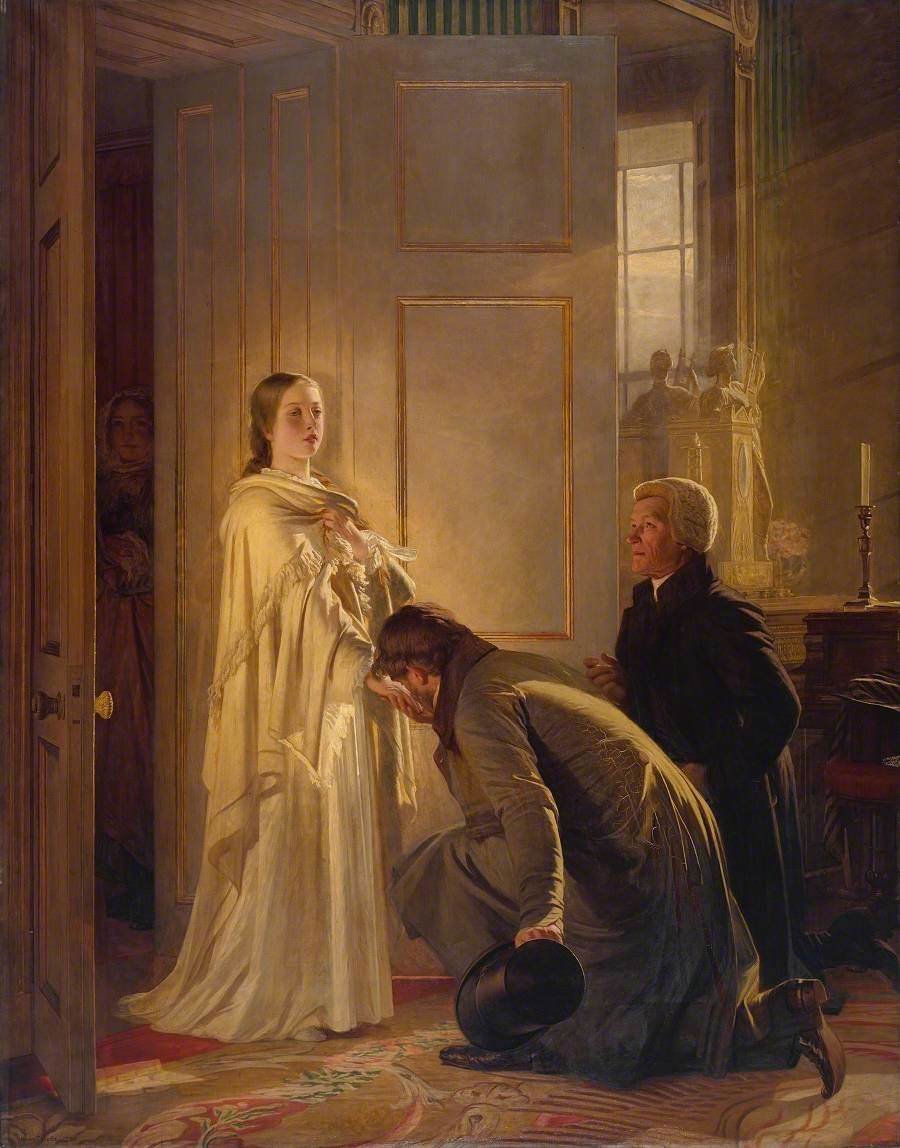
Victoria Regina by Henry Tanworth Wells

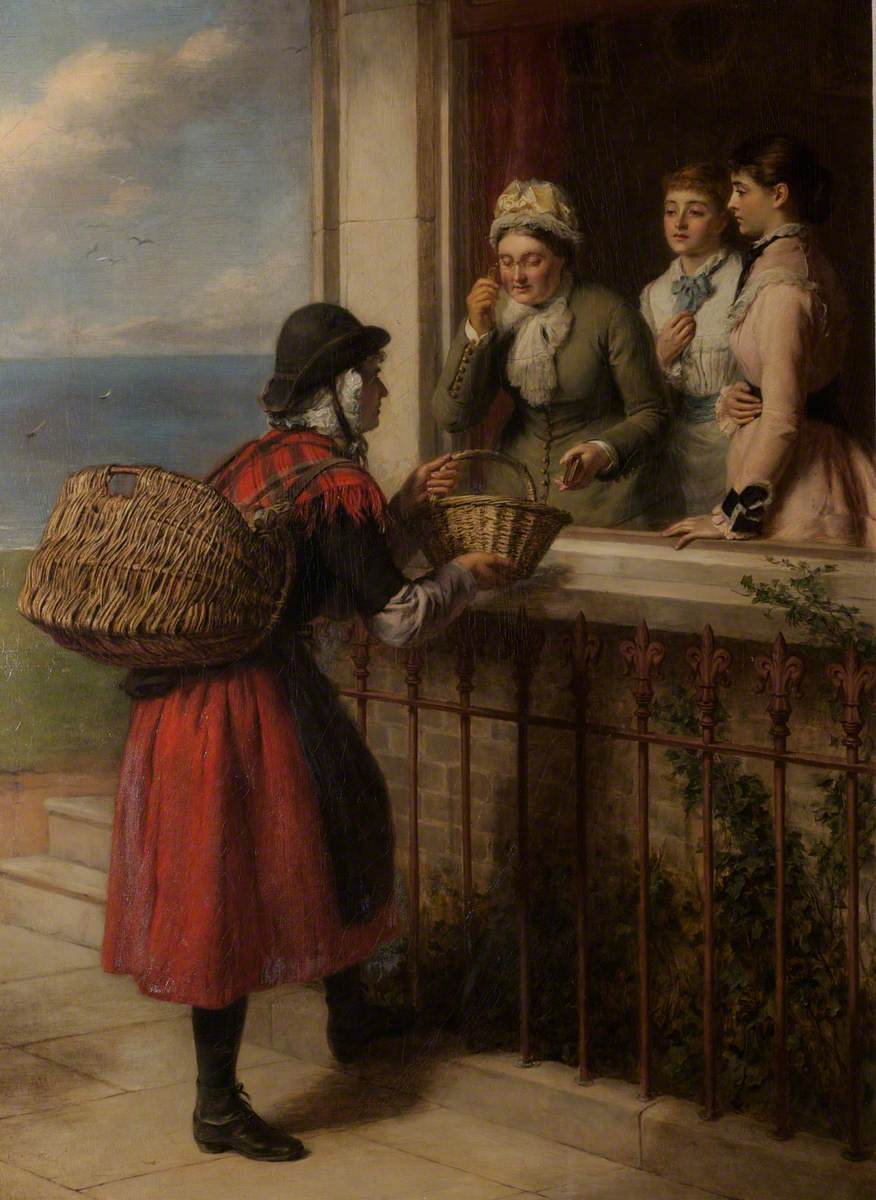
Tenby Fisherwoman by William Powell Frith

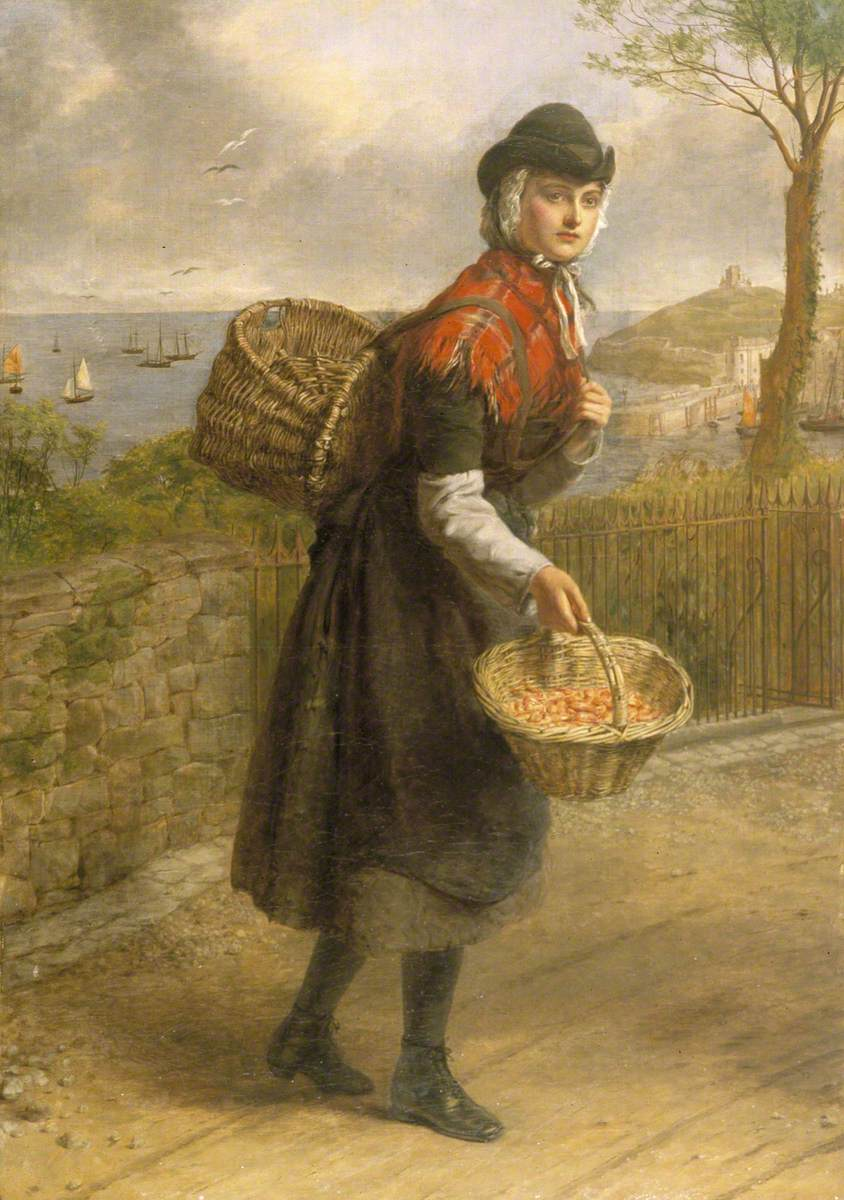
A Tenby Prawn Seller by William Powell Frith

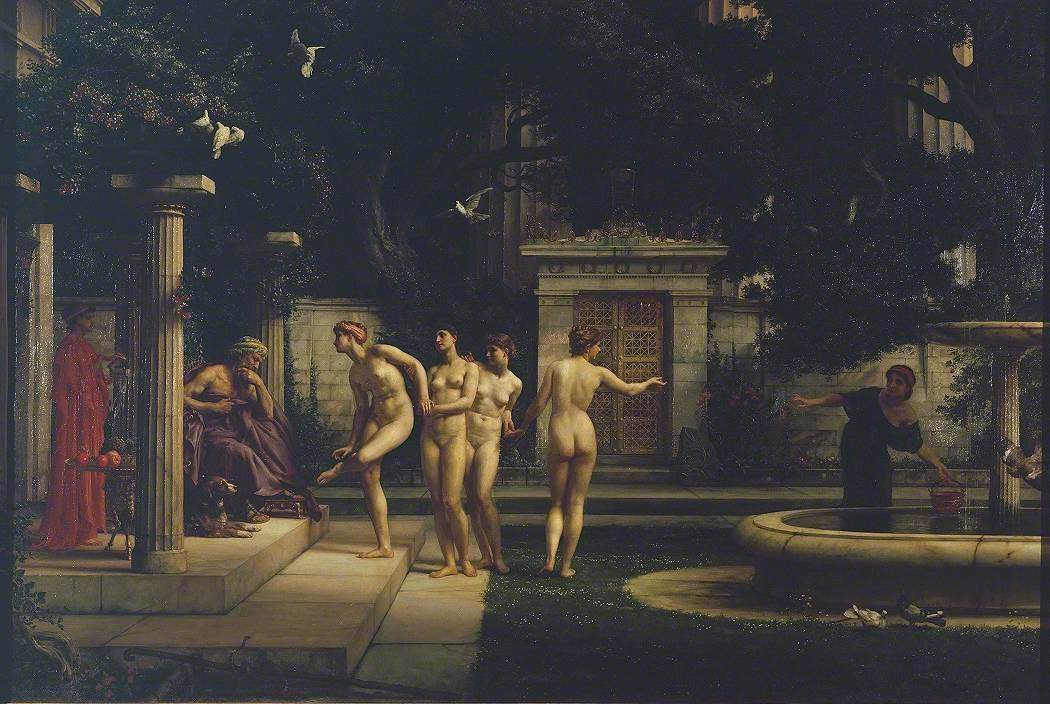
A Visit to Aesculapius by Edward Poynter

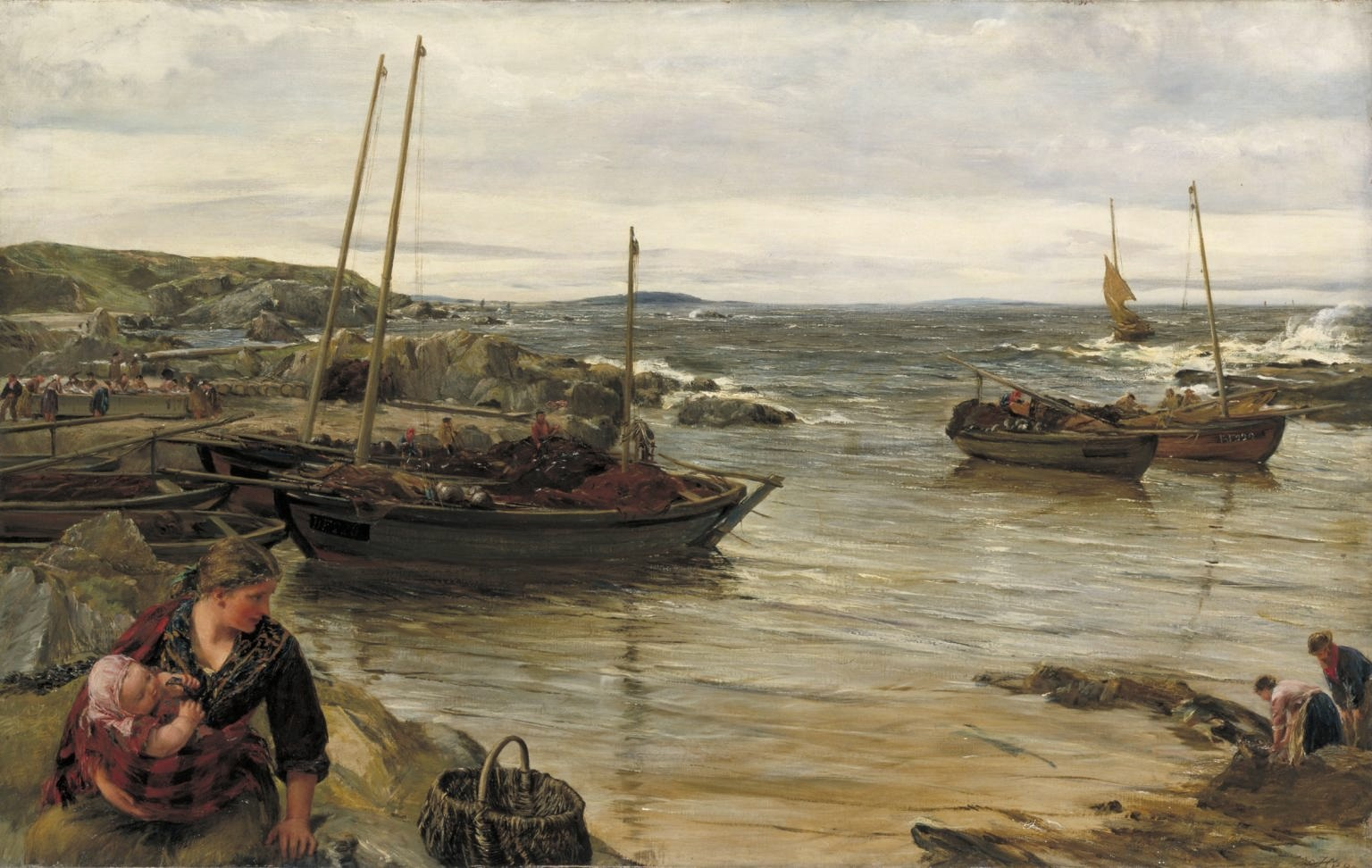
Home with the Tide by James Clarke Hook

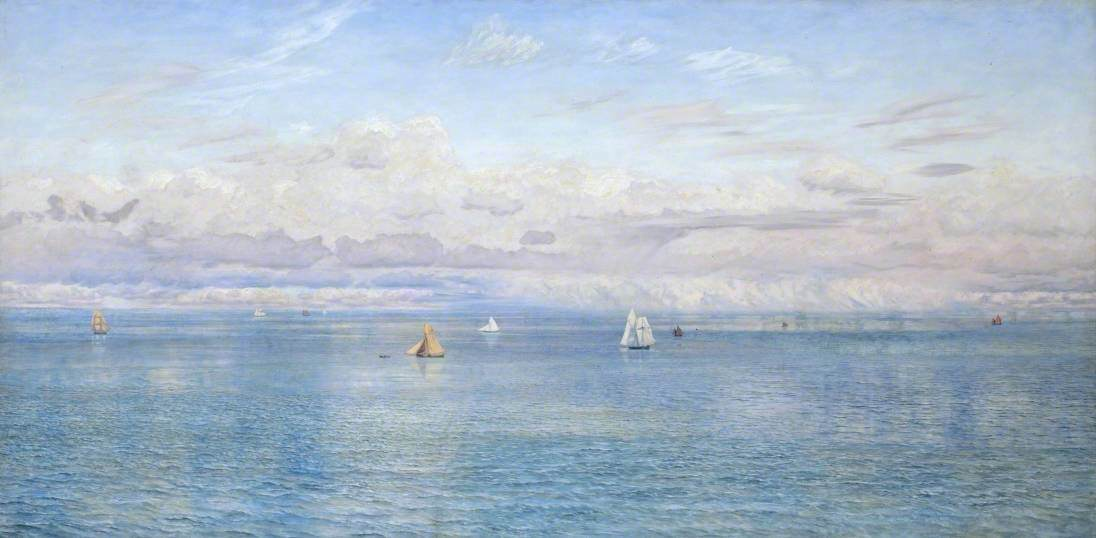
Britannia's Realm by John Brett

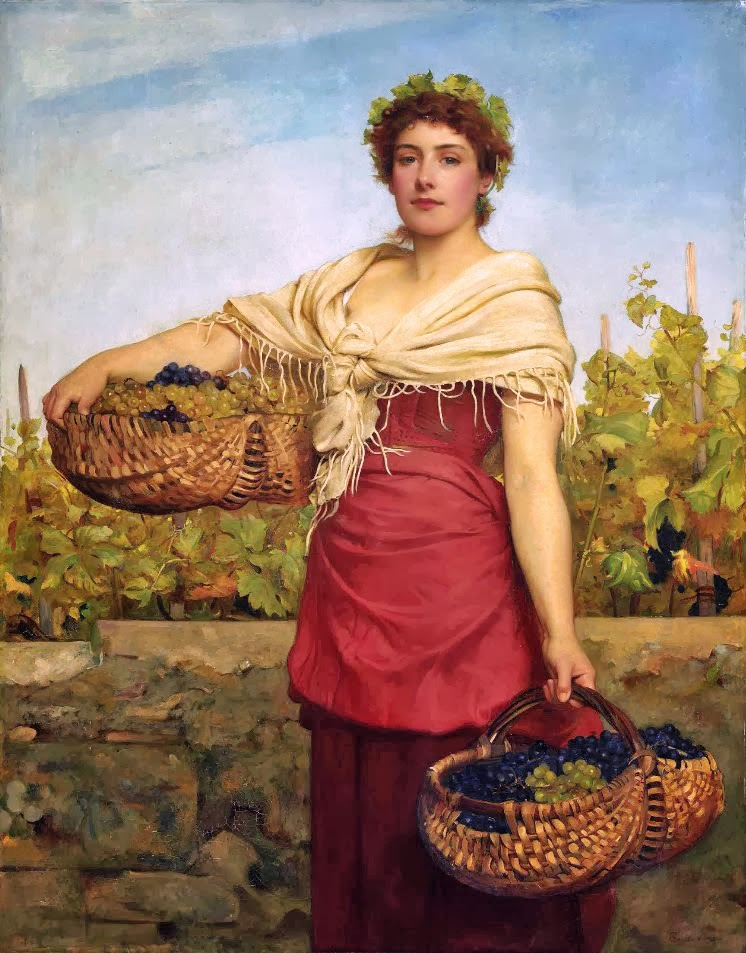
The Vine by Philip Hermogenes Calderon

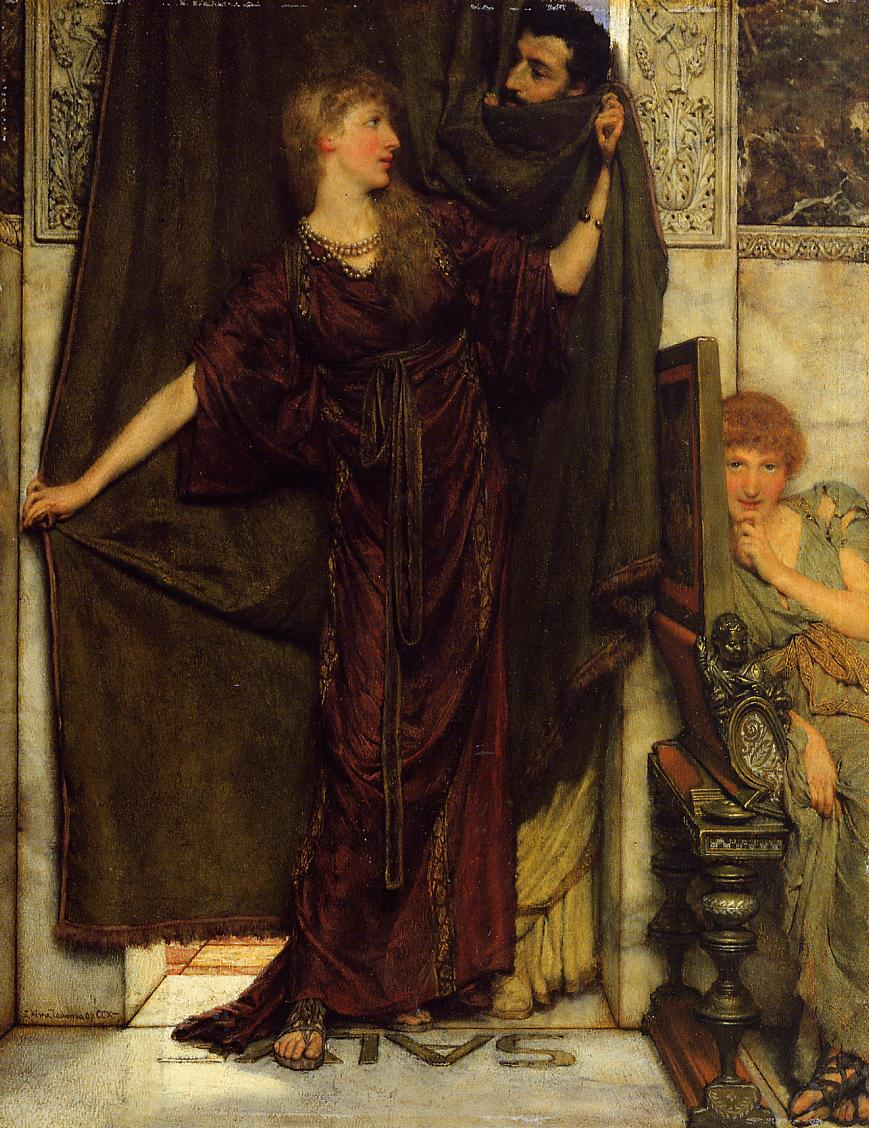
Not at Home by Lawrence Alma-Tadema

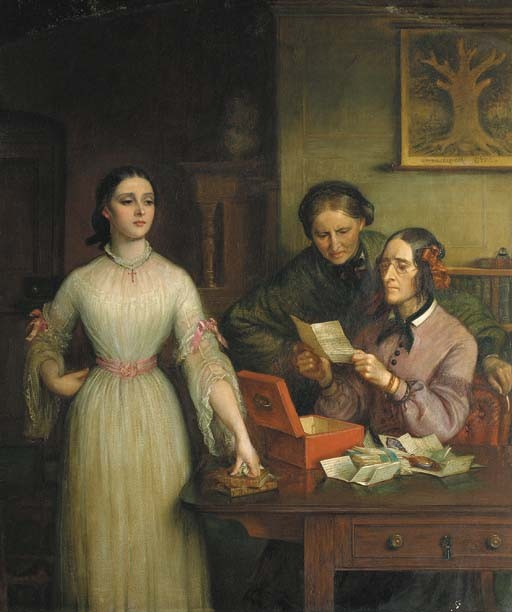
The Inquisition by Charles West Cope

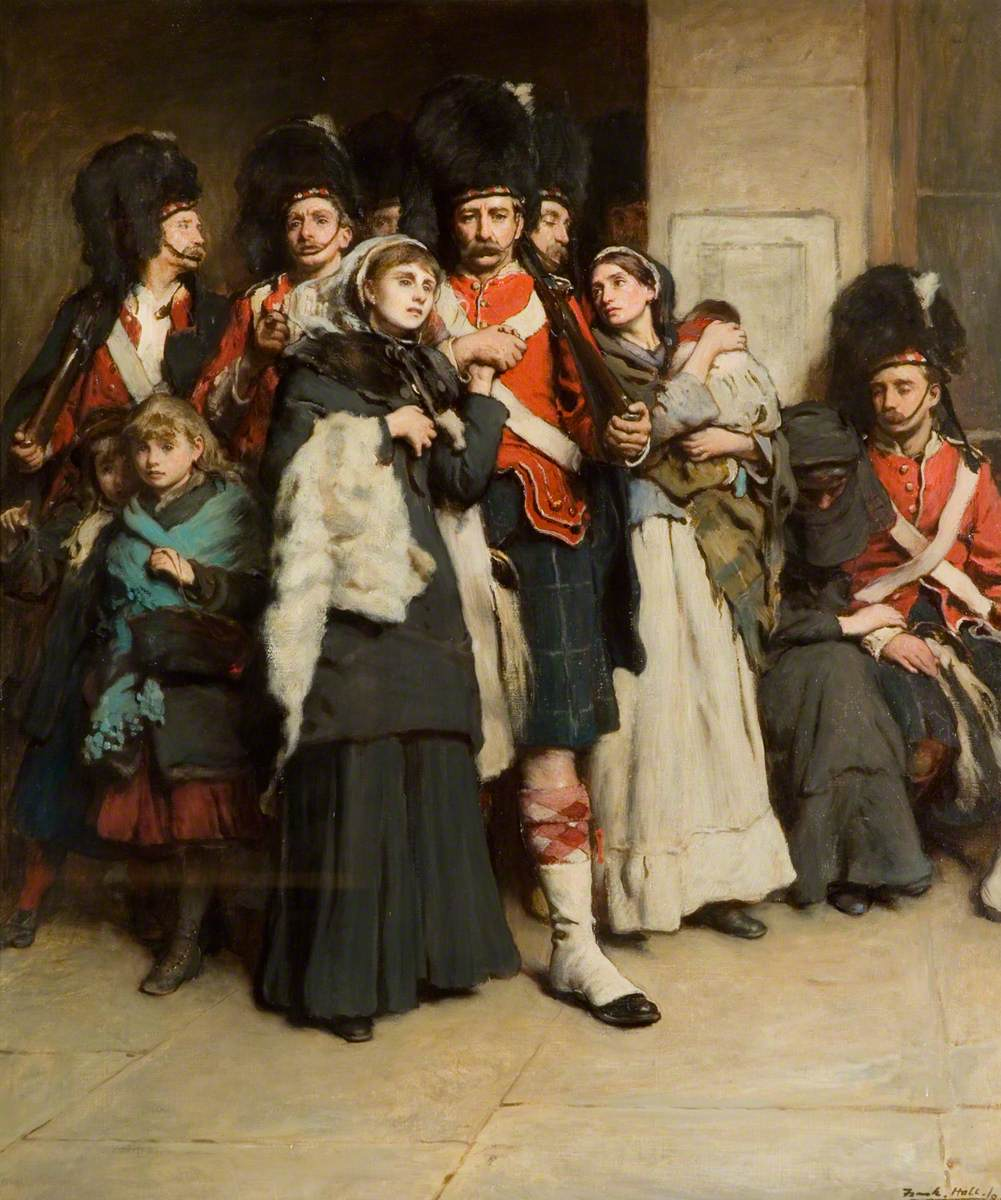
Ordered to the Front by Frank Holl

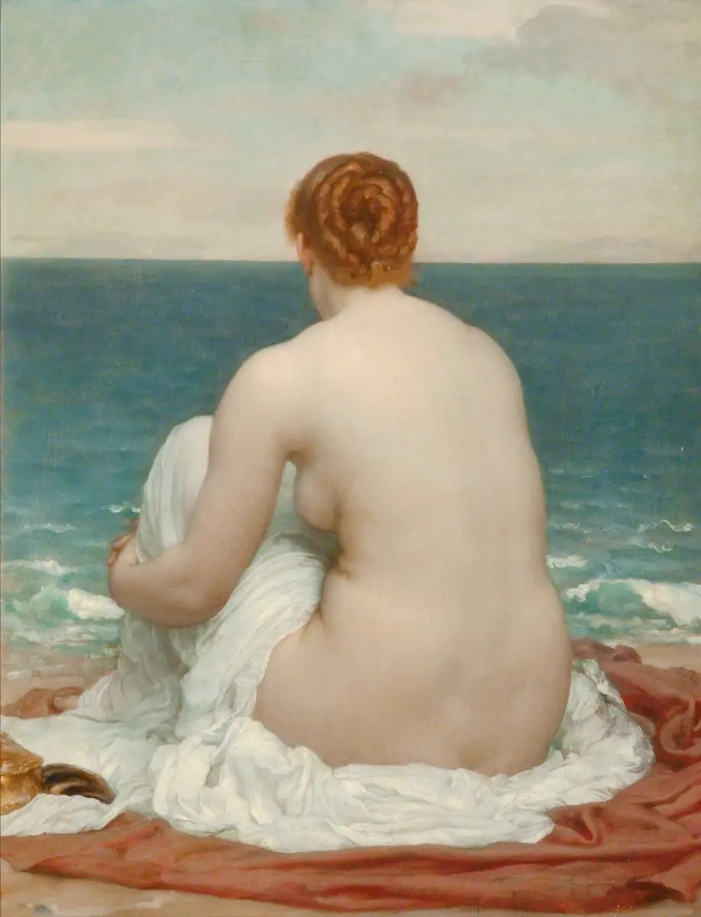
Psamathe by Frederic Leighton

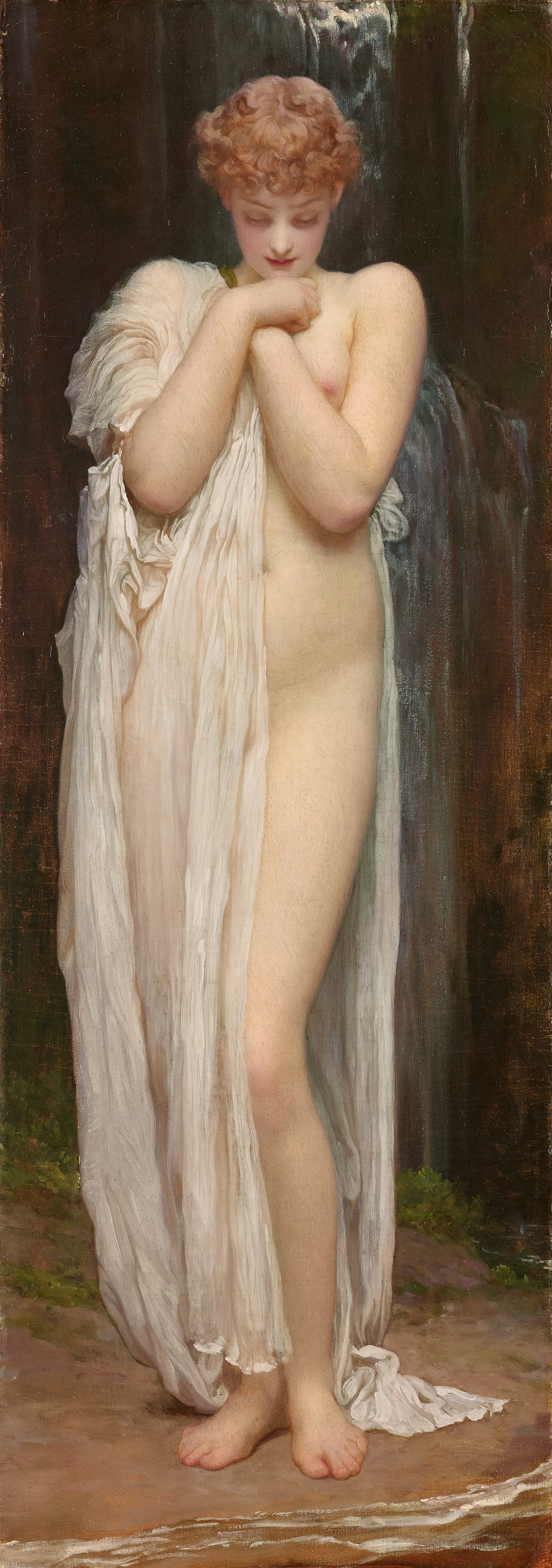
Crenaia by Frederic Leighton

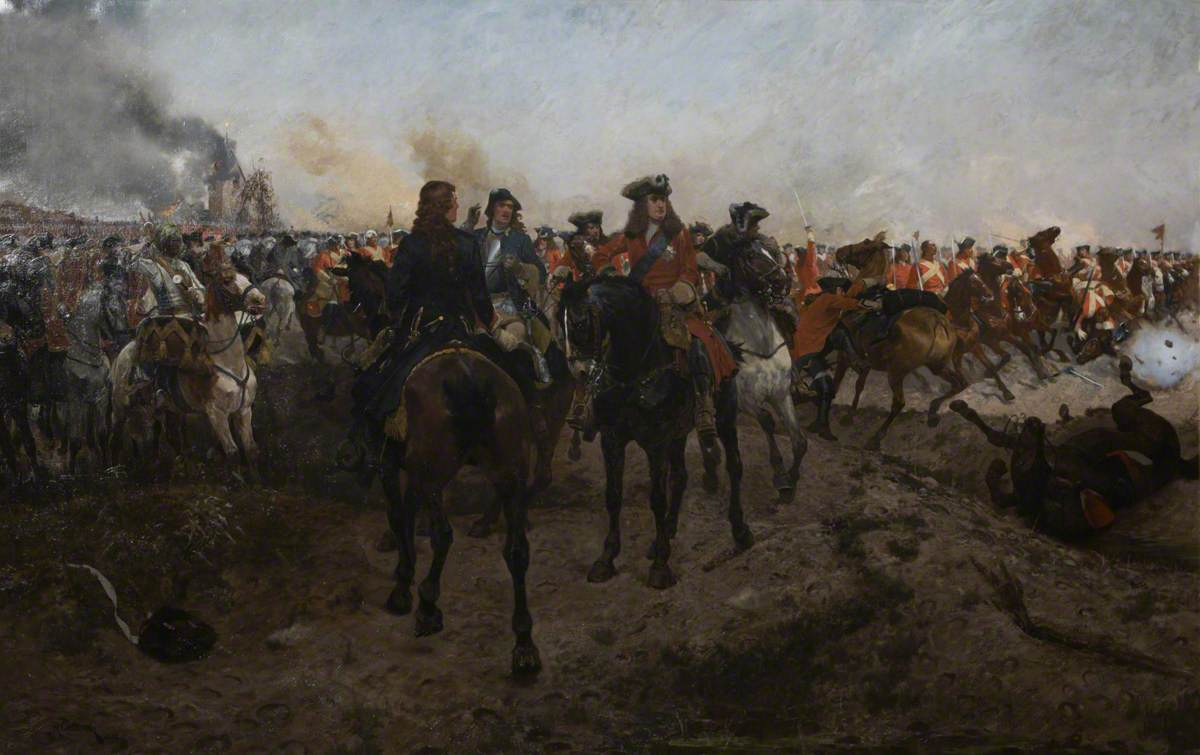
Battle of Blenheim by Richard Caton Woodville

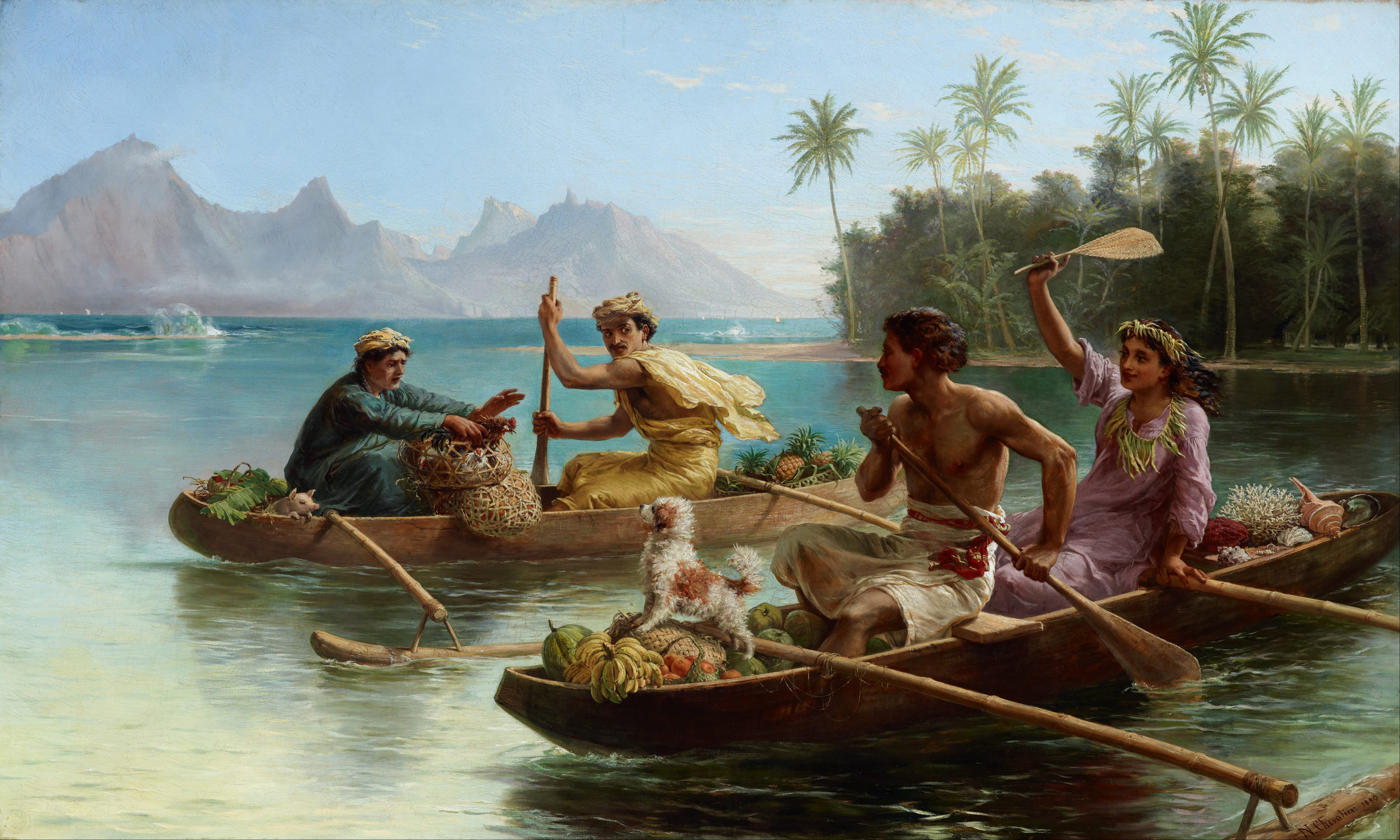
Race to the Market, Tahiti by Nicholas Chevalier

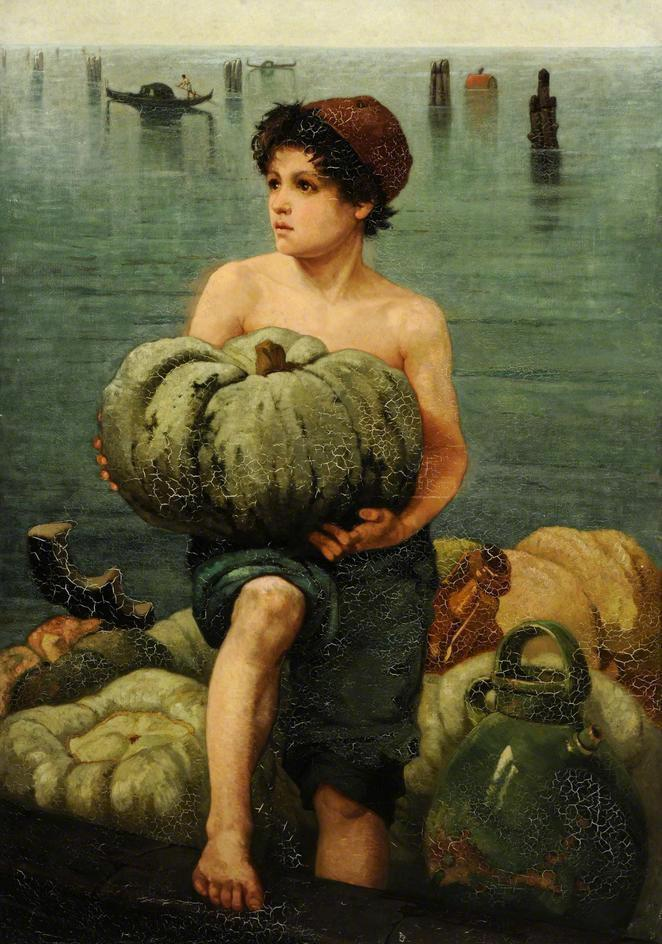
A Venetian Boy Unloading a Market Boat by Hilda Montalba

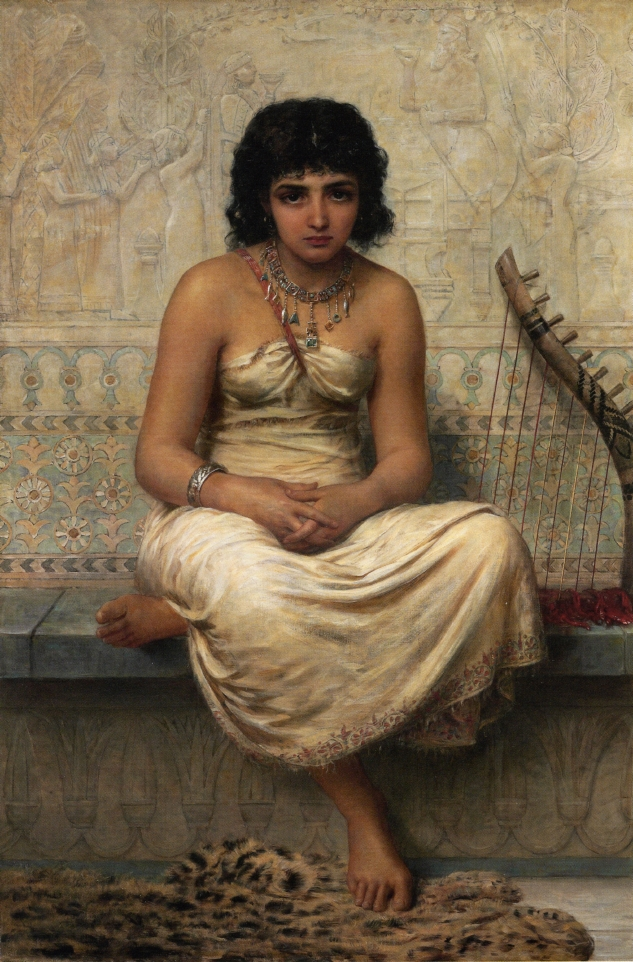
The Assyrian Captive by Edwin Long

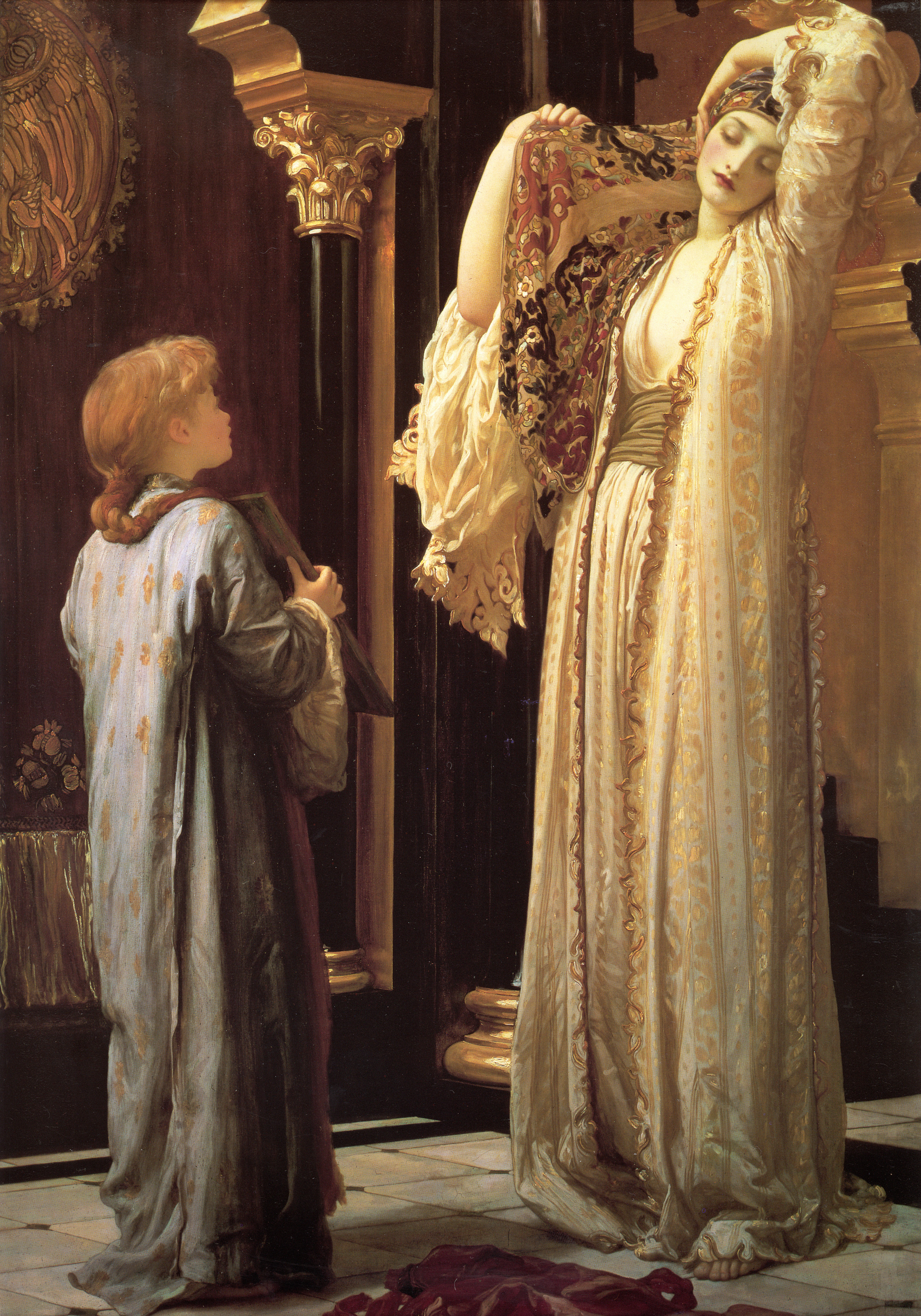
Light of the Harem by Frederic Leighton

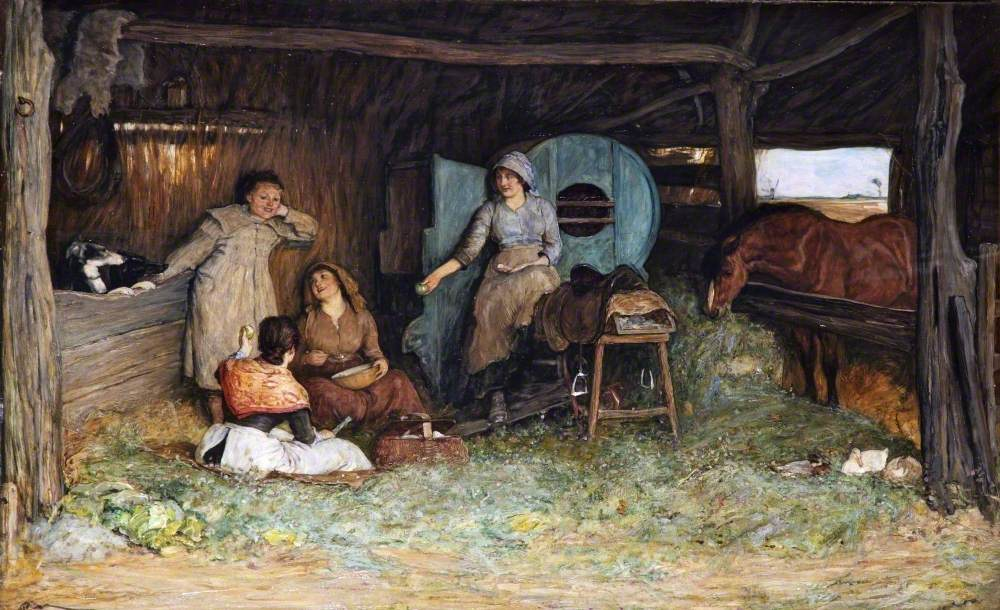
In Clover by Robert Walker Macbeth

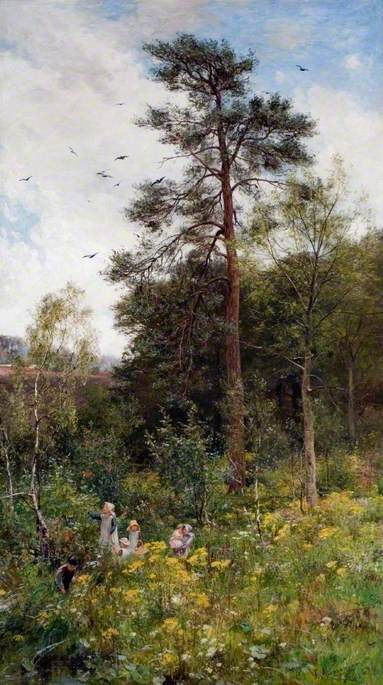
A Nook in Nature's Garden by James Aumonier

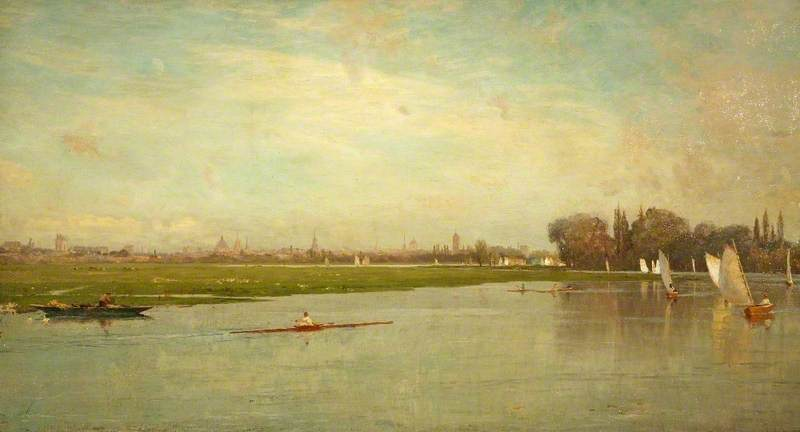
Oxford by James Aumonier

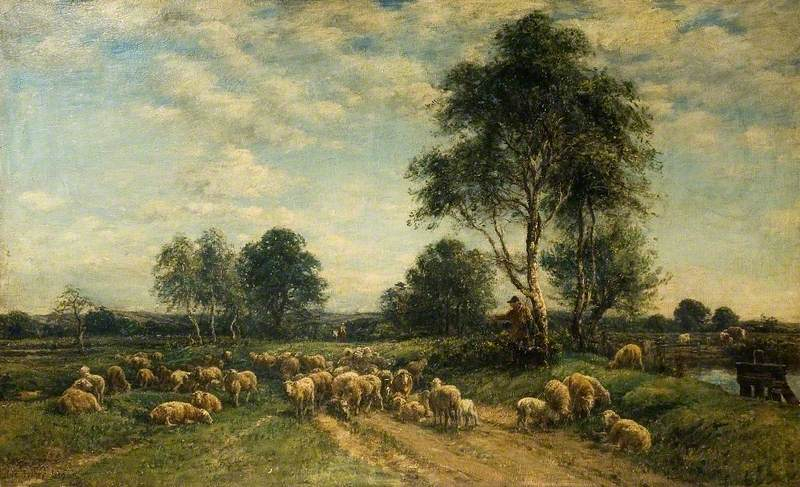
The Halt by Mark Fisher

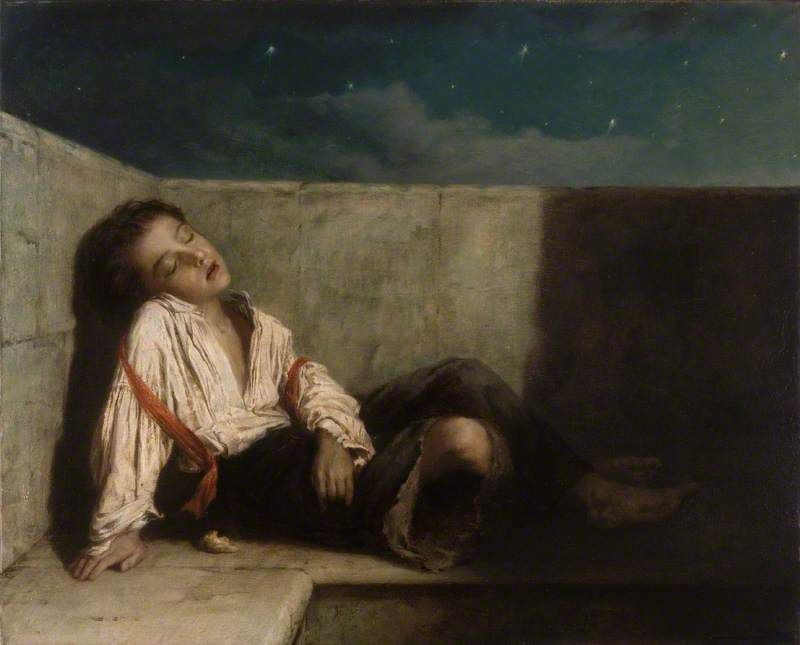
A Recess on a London Bridge by Augustus Edwin Mulready

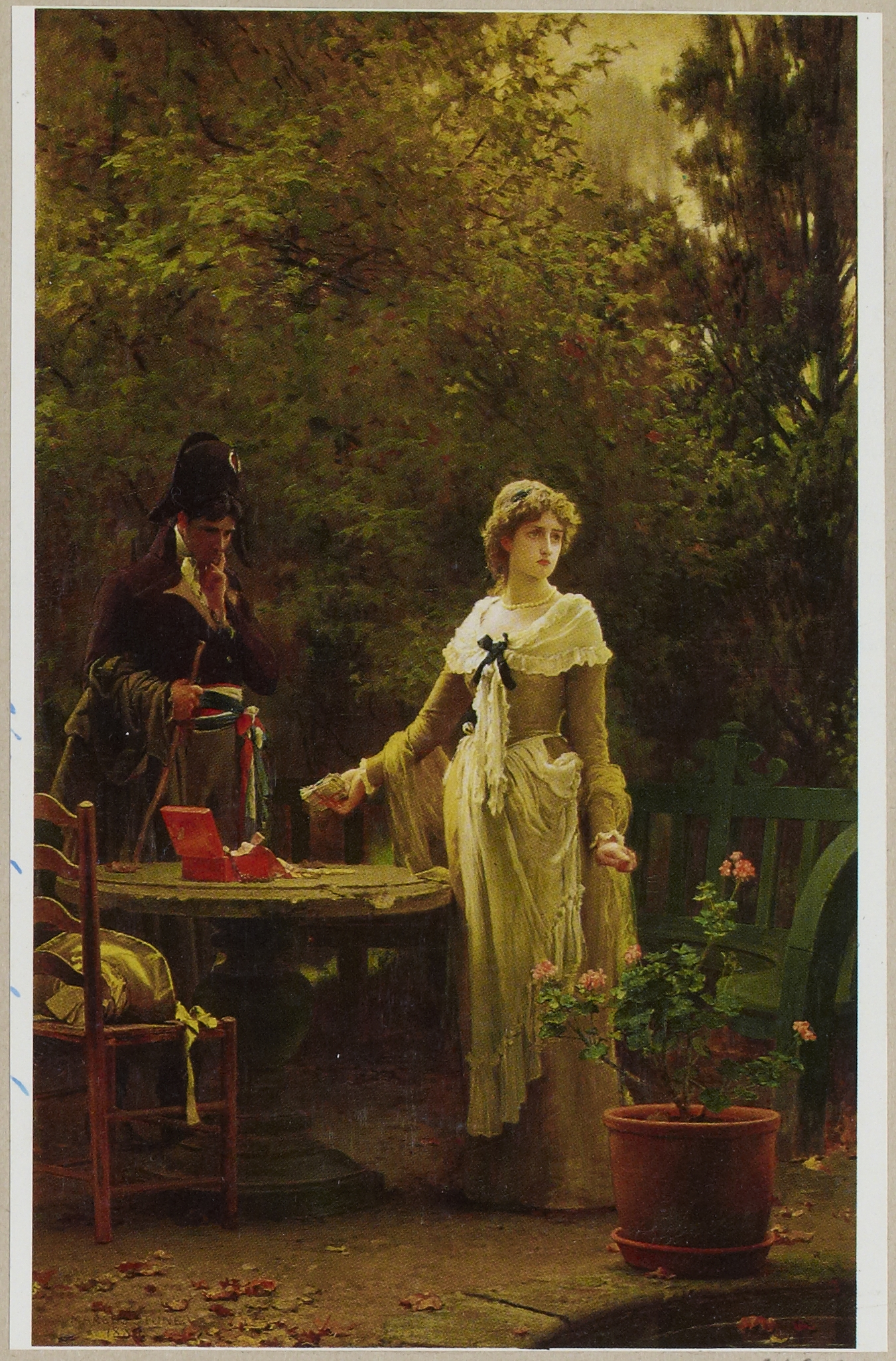
Amour ou Patrie by Marcus Stone

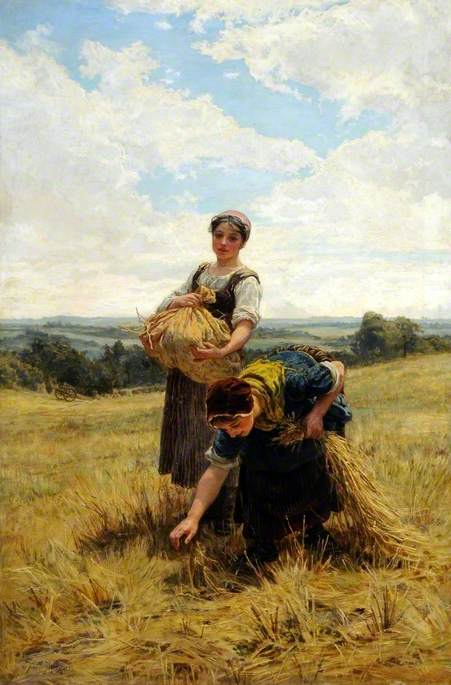
Gleaners by Frederick Morgan

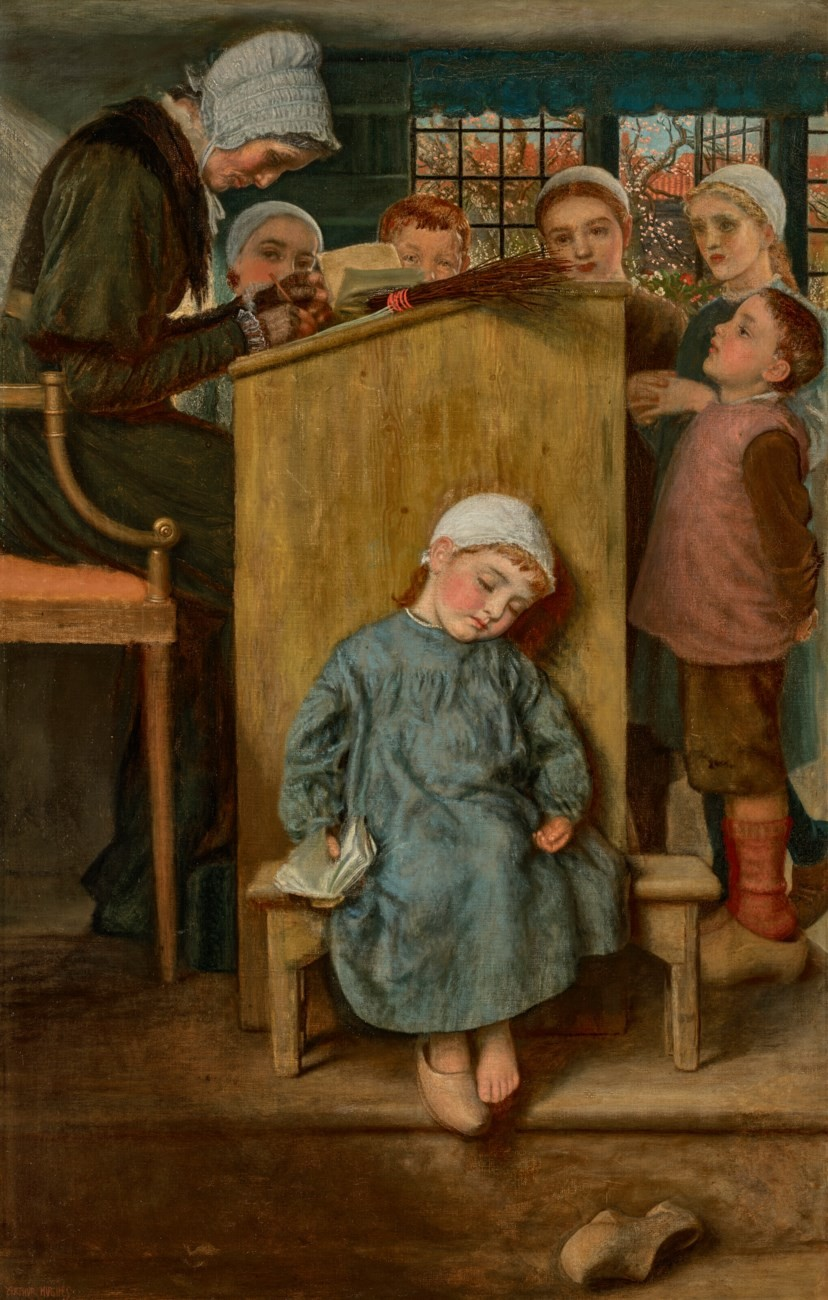
En Pénitence by Arthur Hughes

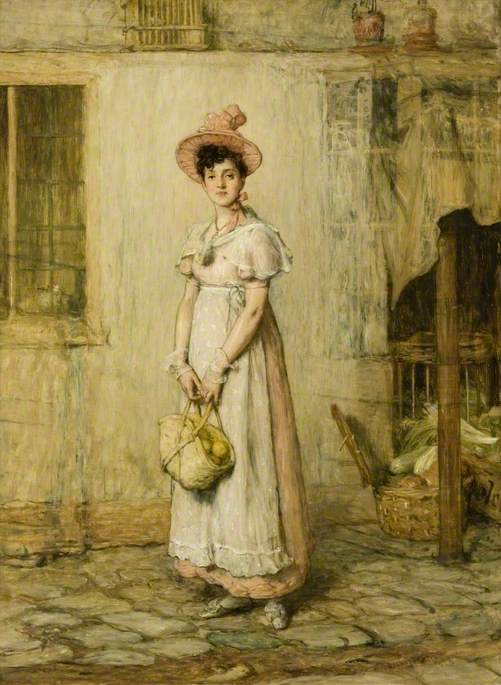
The Young Housewife by William Quiller Orchardson

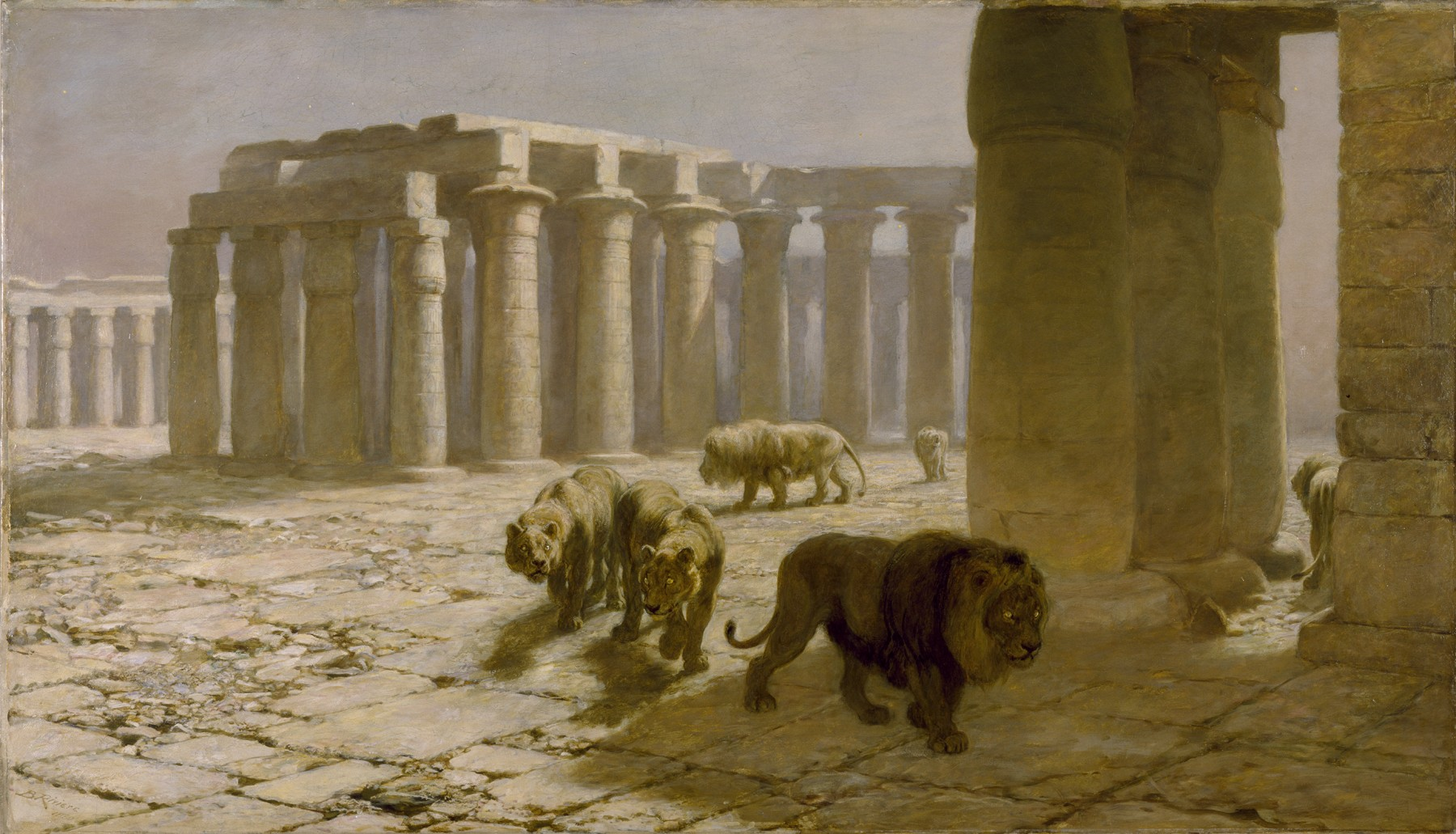
Syria, The Night Watch by Briton Rivière

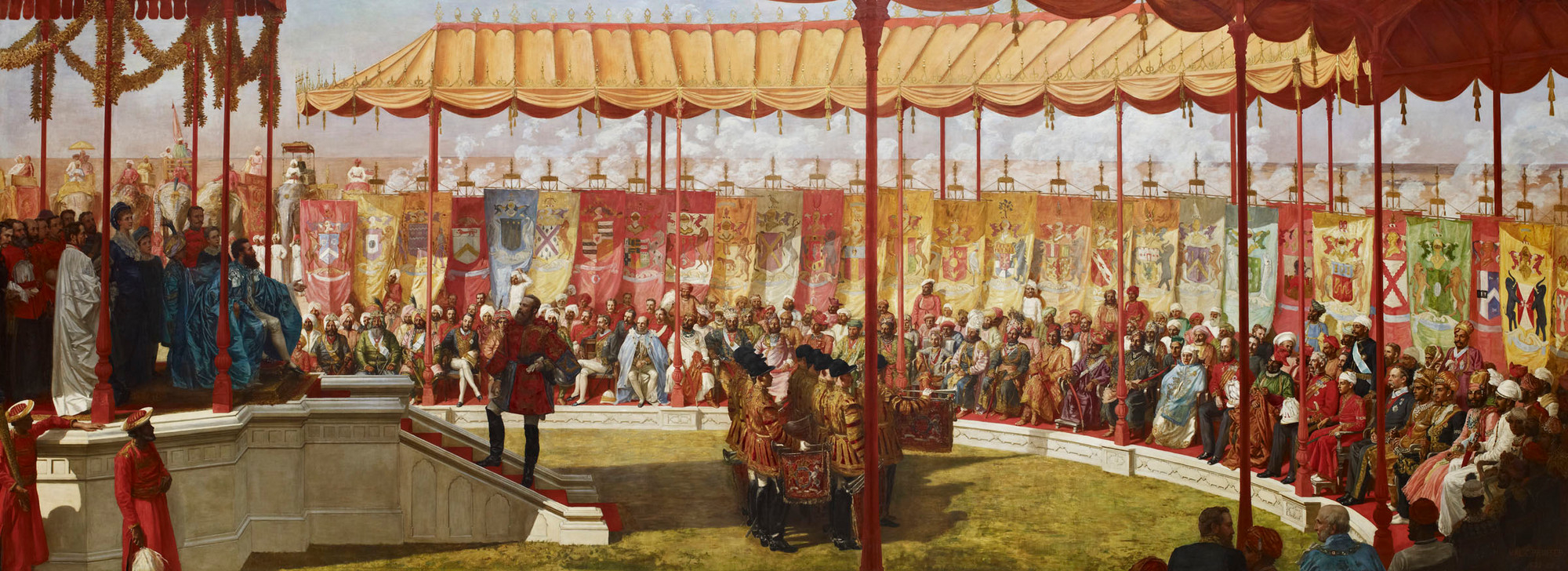
The Imperial Assemblage Held at Delhi by Valentine Cameron Prinsep

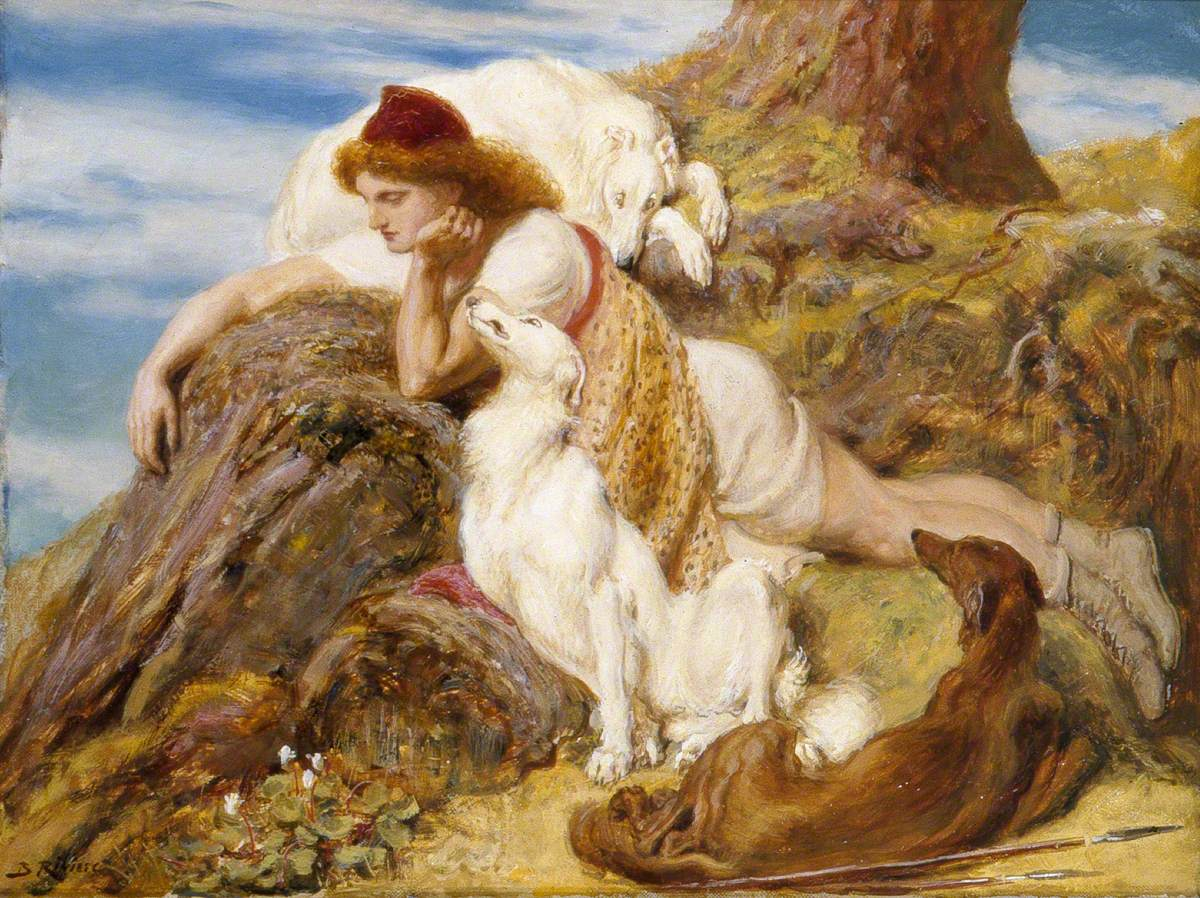
Endymion by Briton Riviere

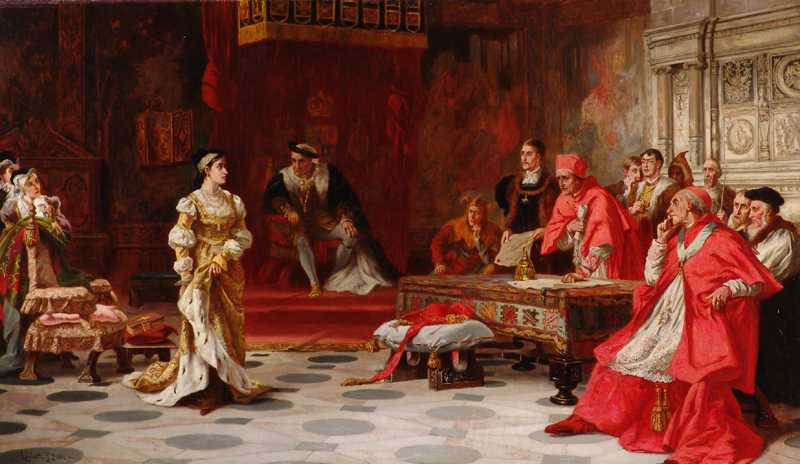
The Trial of Queen Catherine by Laslett John Pott

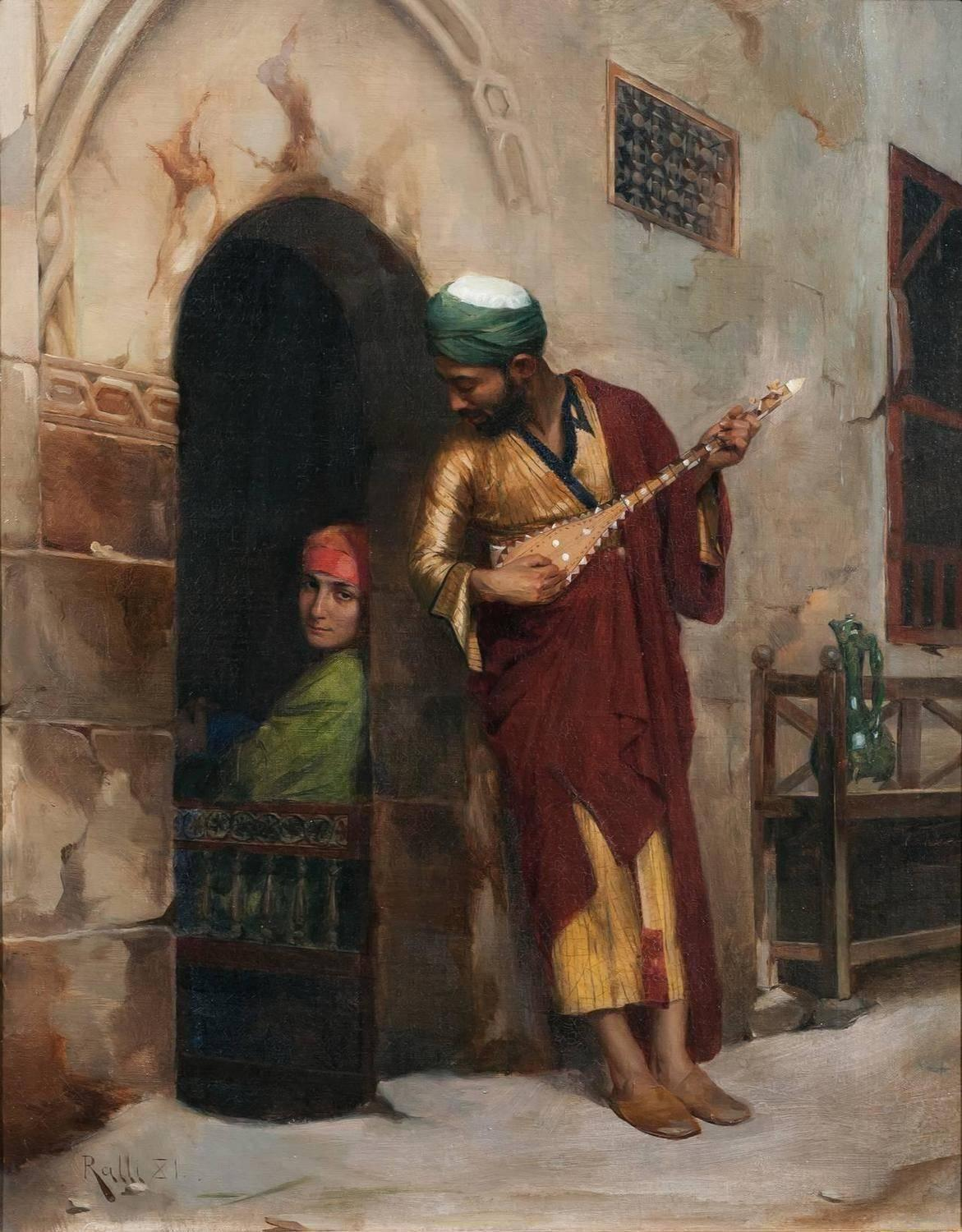
Courship in Cairo by Théodore Ralli

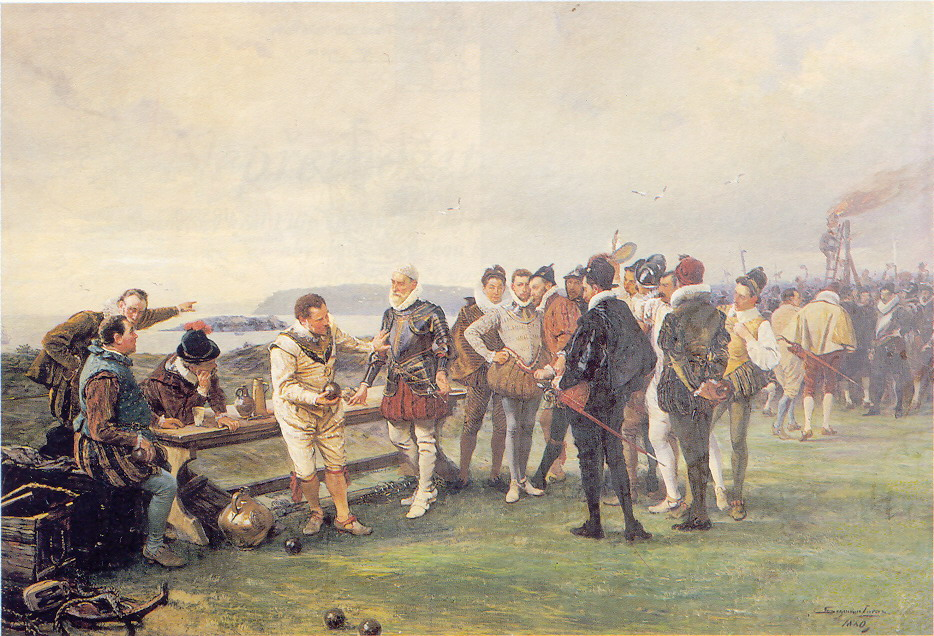
The Armada in Sight by John Seymour Lucas

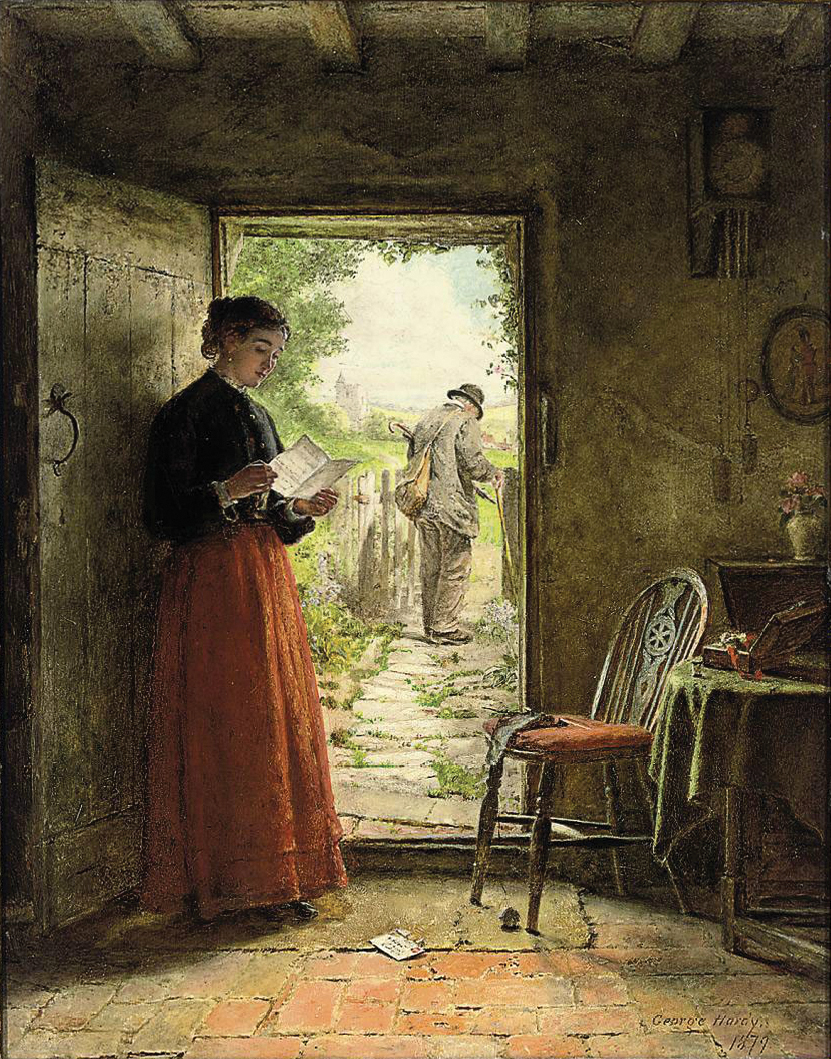
The Welcome Letter by George Hardy

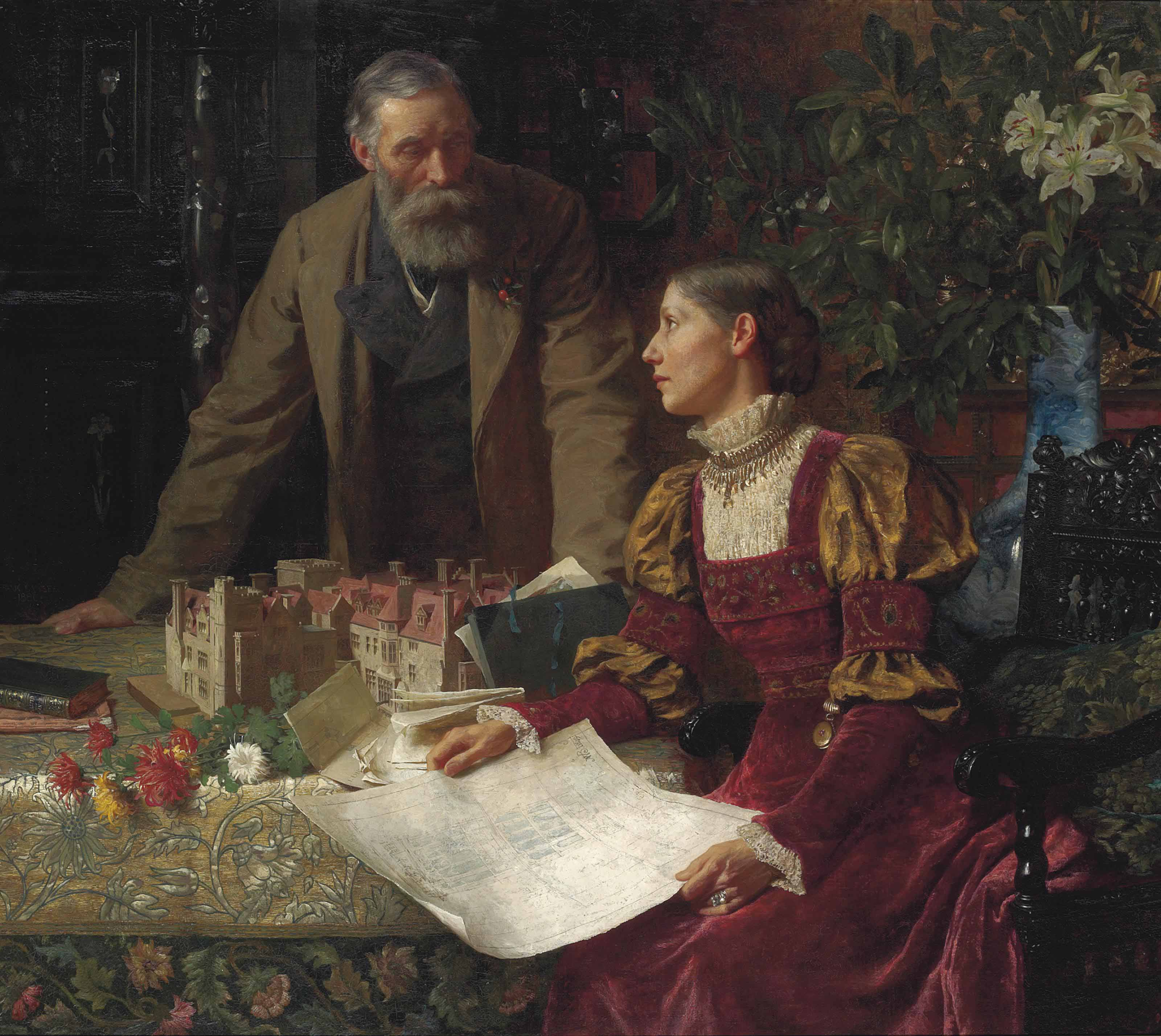
The House Builders by Frank Dicksee

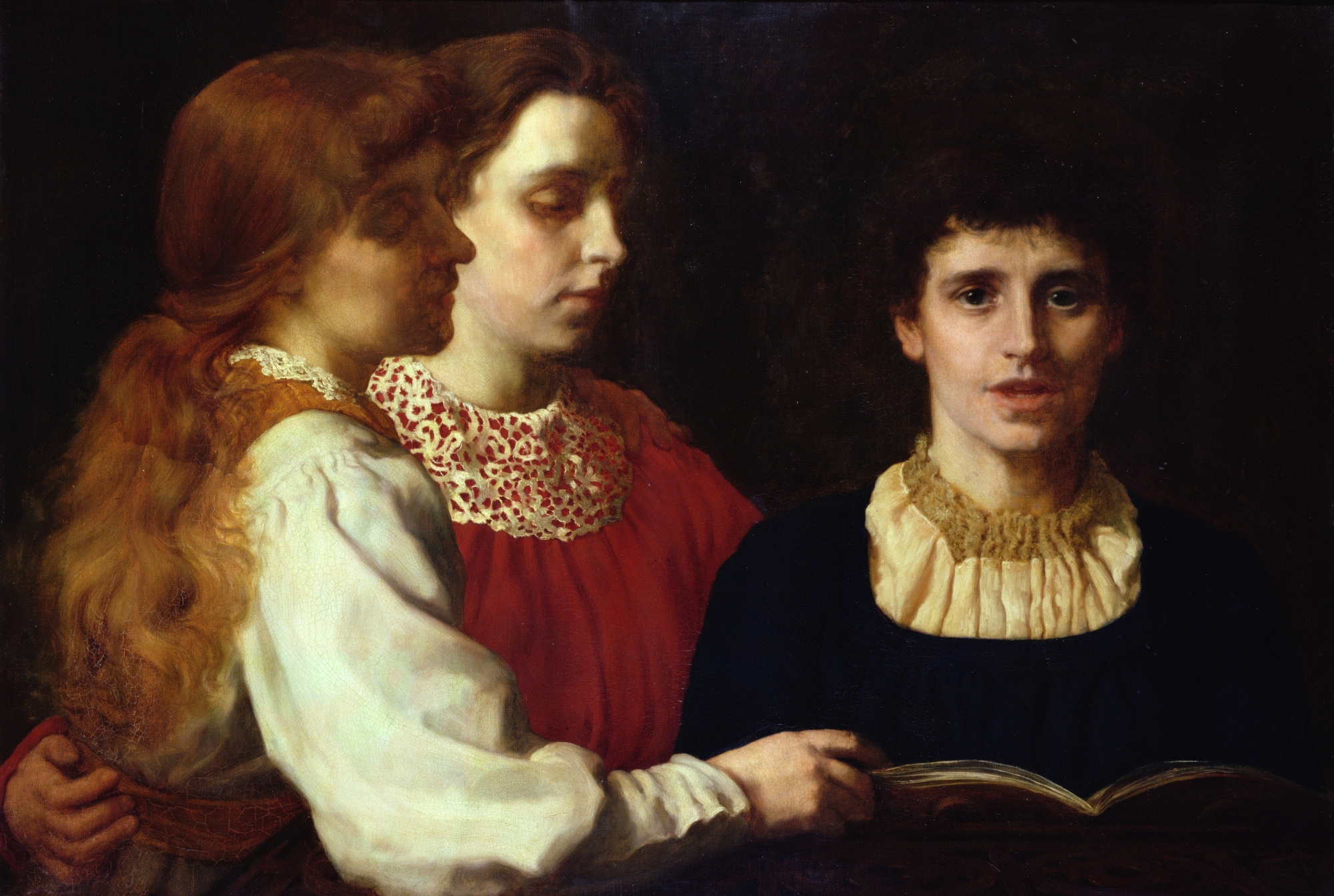
The Misses Santley by Henry Scott Tuke

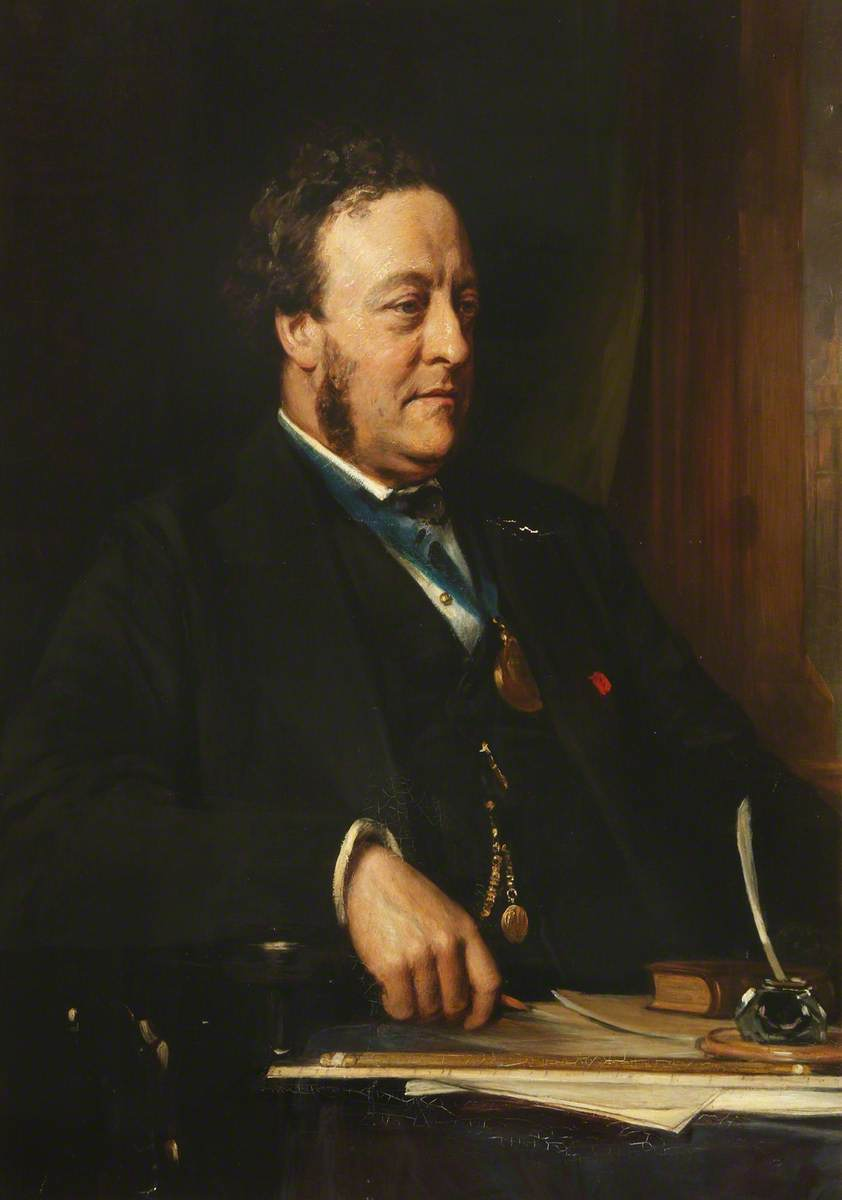
Charles Barry by Lowes Cato Dickinson

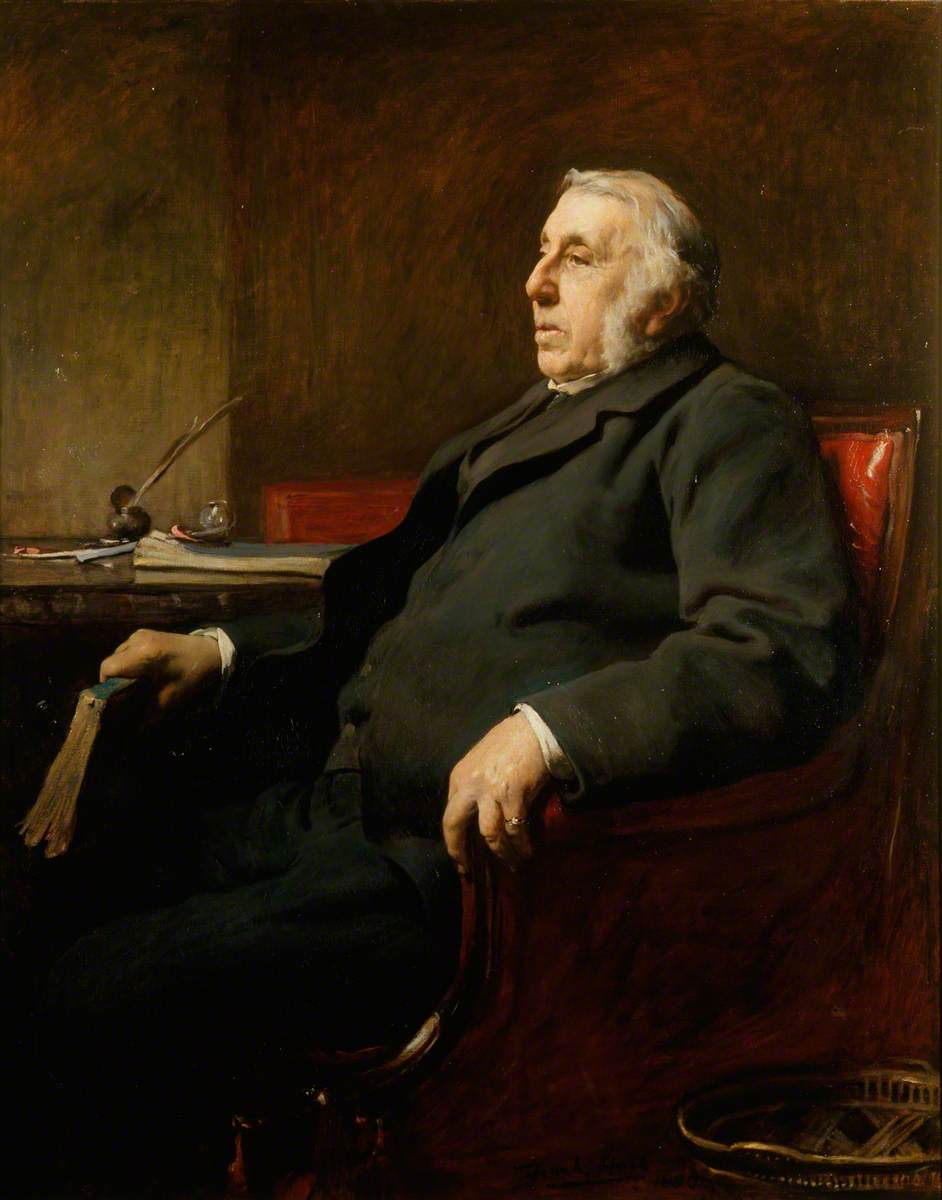
George Graham by Frank Holl

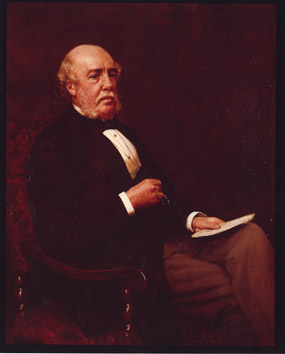
William Henry Barlow by John Collier

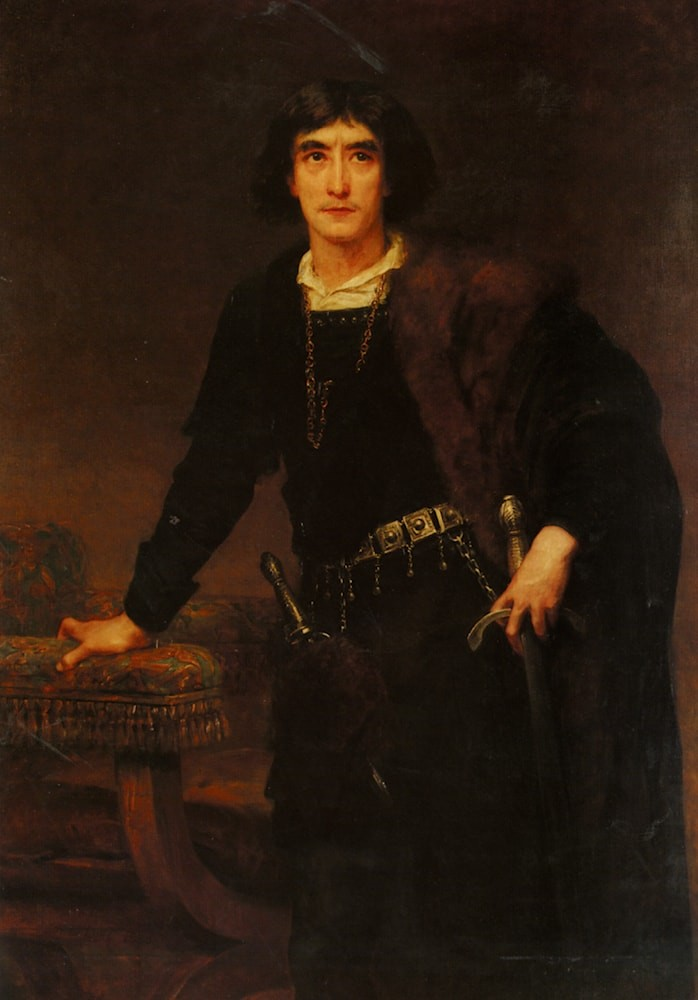
Henry Irving as Hamlet by Edwin Long

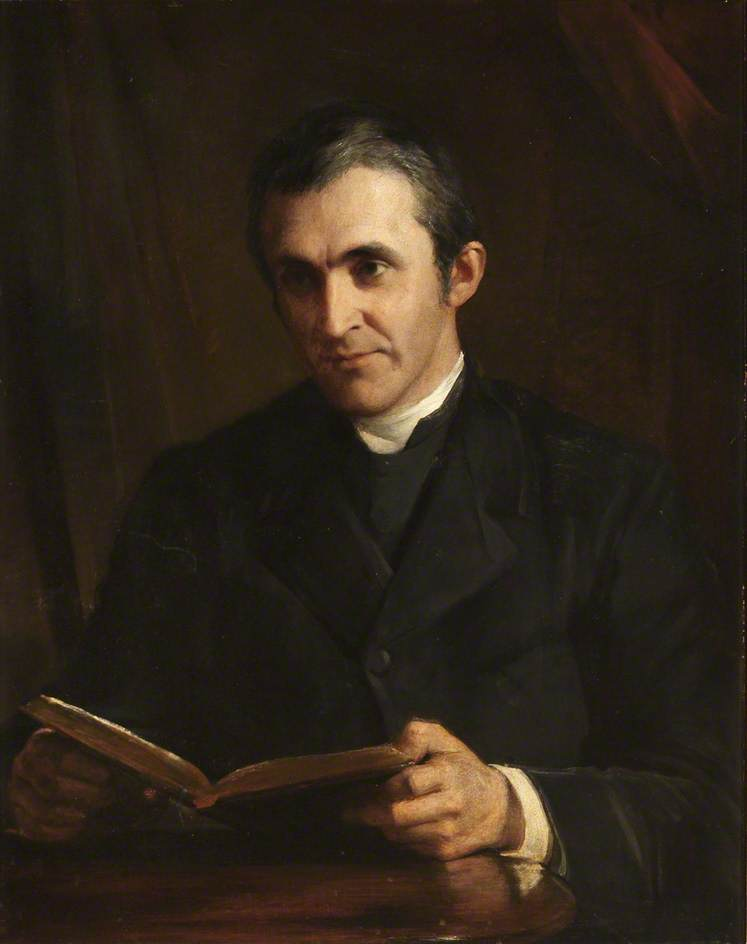
Henry Parry Liddon by George Richmond

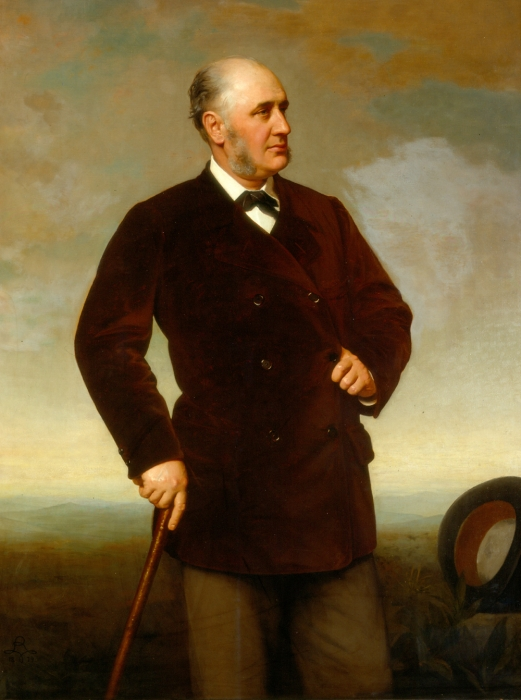
Edward Baring by Rudolf Lehmann

The Dean's Daughter, a portrait of Lily Langtry by George Frederic Watts

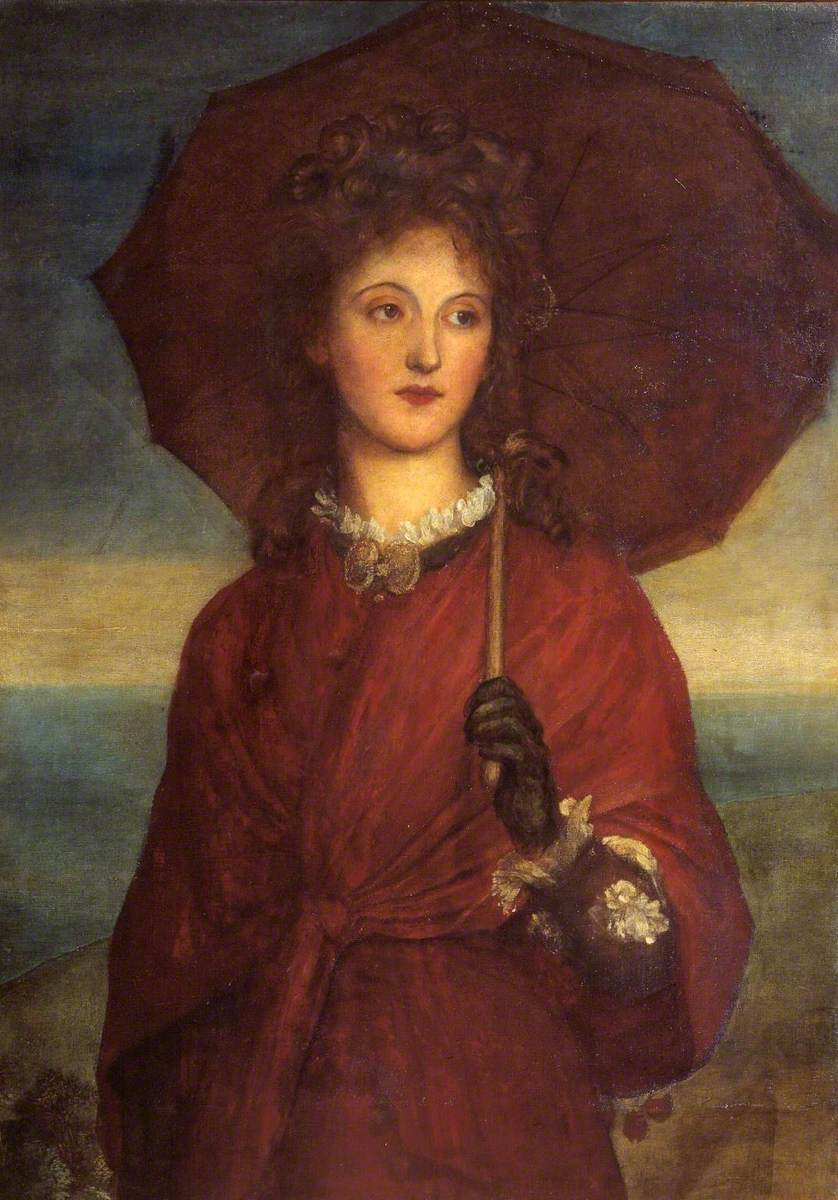
Eveleen Myers by George Frederic Watts

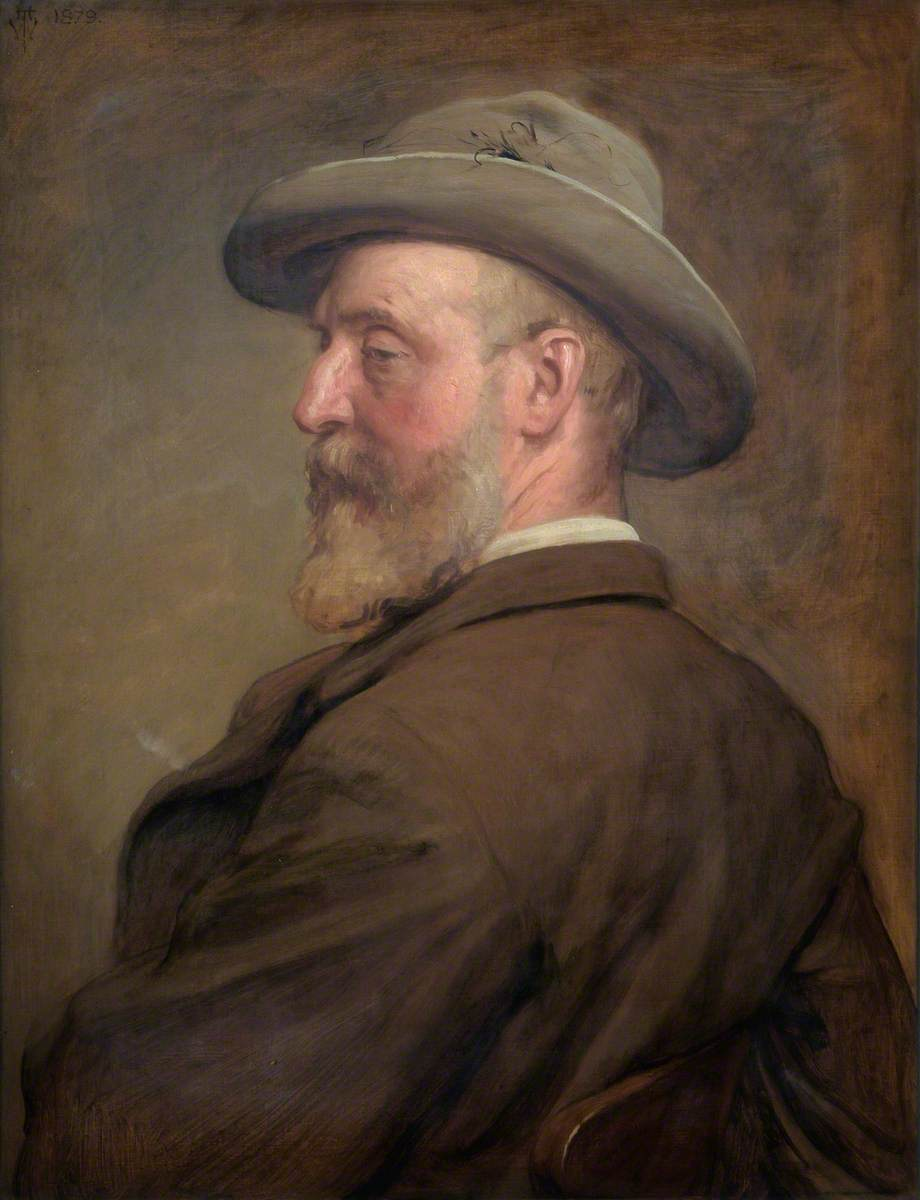
Charles West Cope by Henry Tanworth Wells

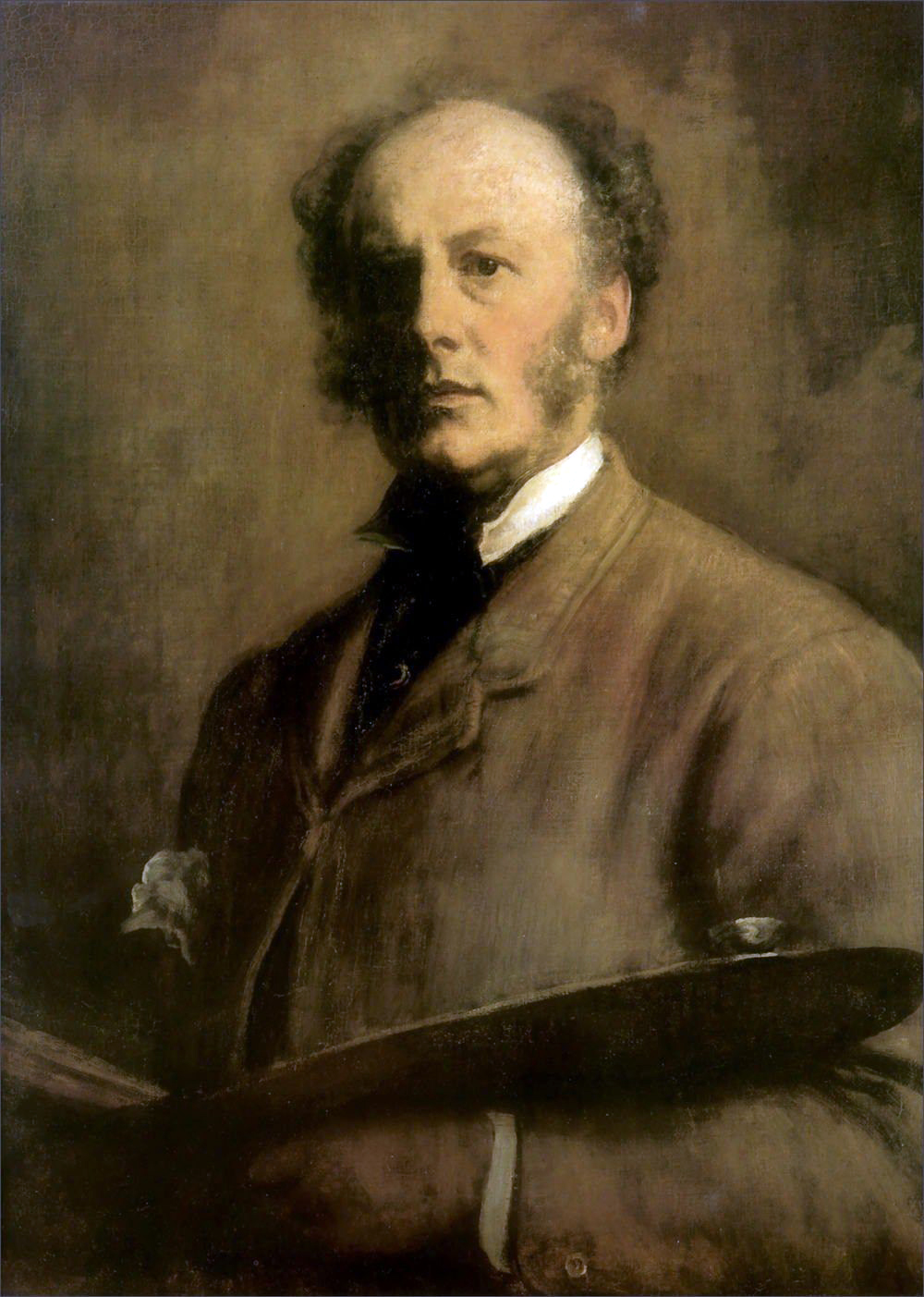
Self-Portrait by John Everett Millais

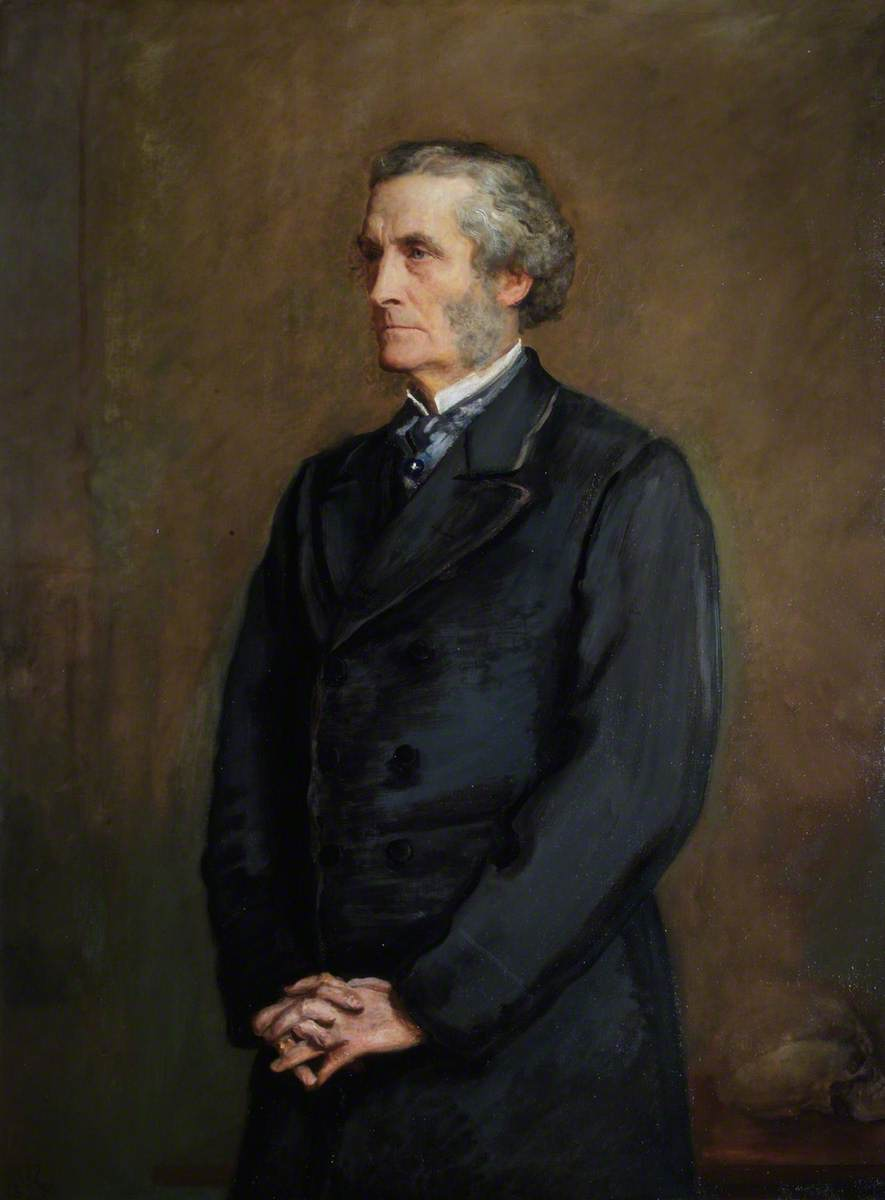
Luther Holden by John Everett Millais

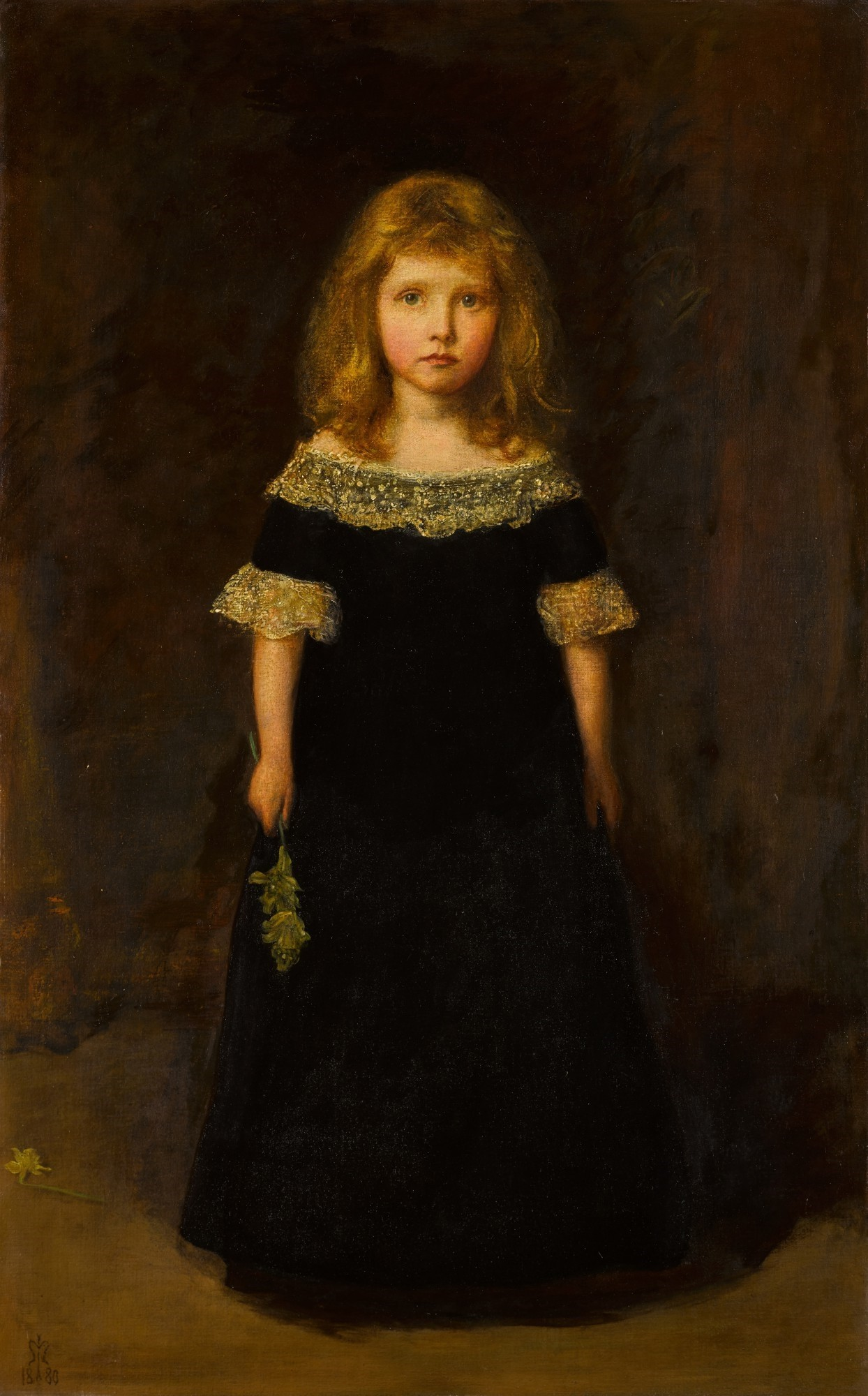
Catherine Meriel Cowell-Stepney by John Everett Millais

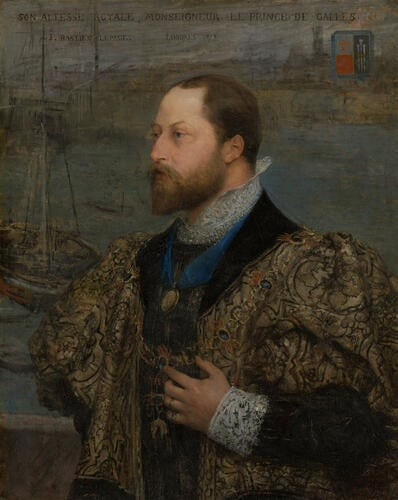
Portrait of the Prince of Wales by Jules Bastien-Lepage

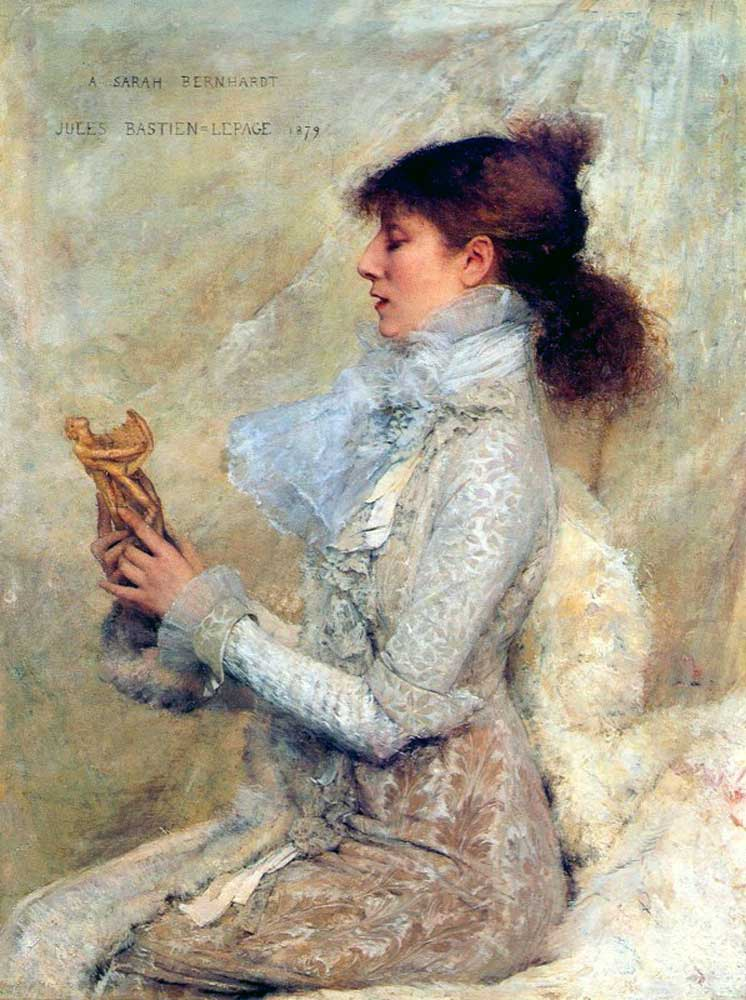
Portrait of Sarah Bernhardt by Jules Bastien-Lepage

== Bibliography ==
- Green, Richard & Sellars, Jane. William Powell Frith: The People's Painter. Bloomsbury, 2019.
- Payne, Christiana. Where the Sea Meets the Land: Artists on the Coast in Nineteenth-century Britain. Sanson, 2007.
