= Aumonier =

Aumonier is a surname, and may refer to:

- Eric Aumonier (1899–1974), sculptor
- Éric Aumonier (b. 1946), bishop
- James Aumonier (1832–1911), landscape painter
- Kate Aumonier, singer
- Stacy Aumonier (1877–1928), writer

French word aumônier means almoner.

== See also ==
- Almoner
