= Napoleon on Board the Bellerophon =

Painting by William Quiller Orchardson

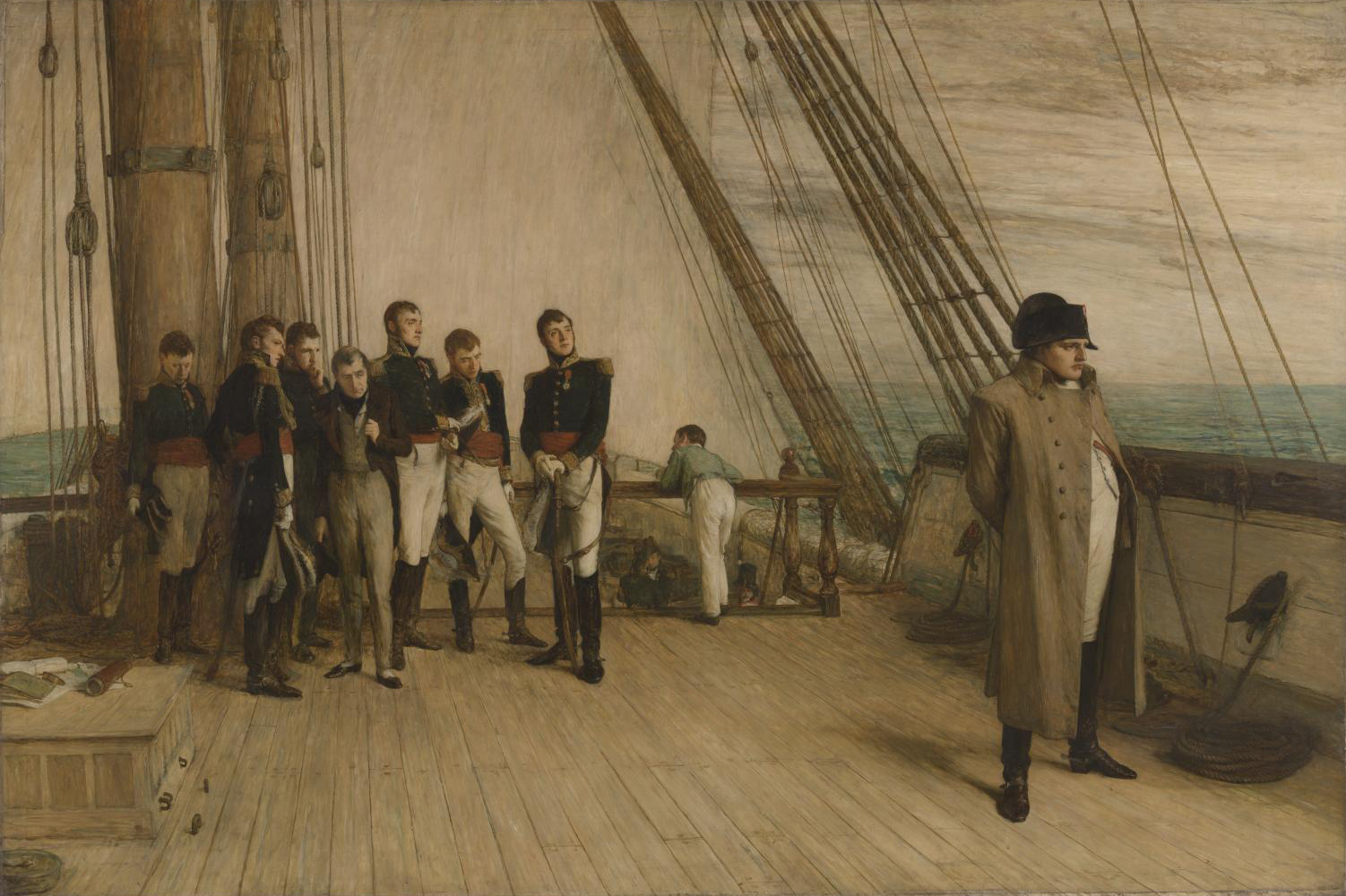
- Artist: William Quiller Orchardson
- Year: 1880
- Medium: Oil on canvas, history painting
- Dimensions: 165.1 cm × 248.9 cm (65.0 in × 98.0 in)
- Location: Tate Britain, London

Napoleon on Board the Bellerophon is an 1880 history painting by the British artist William Quiller Orchardson. It depicts Napoleon, the defeated Emperor of France, as a prisoner onboard the British warship HMS Bellerophon following his defeat during the Waterloo Campaign in 1815. He stands alone on the deck with a group of his aides watching him from close by. It intends to convey the moment he learned he was being exiled to Saint Helena rather than being permitted to stay in England.

The painting was displayed at the Royal Academy Exhibition of 1880 at Burlington House in Piccadilly. It was acquired as part of the Chantrey Bequest the same year and is today in the collection of the Tate Britain in Pimlico.

== Bibliography ==
- Clarke, Stephen. How the French Won Waterloo - Or Think They Did. Random House, 2016.
- Cowling, Mary. Victorian Figurative Painting: Domestic Life and the Contemporary Social Scene. Andreas Papadakis, 2000.
- Wade, Rebecca. An Exhibition History of Victorian Leeds. Liverpool University Press, 2023.
