= Britannia's Realm =

Painting by John Brett

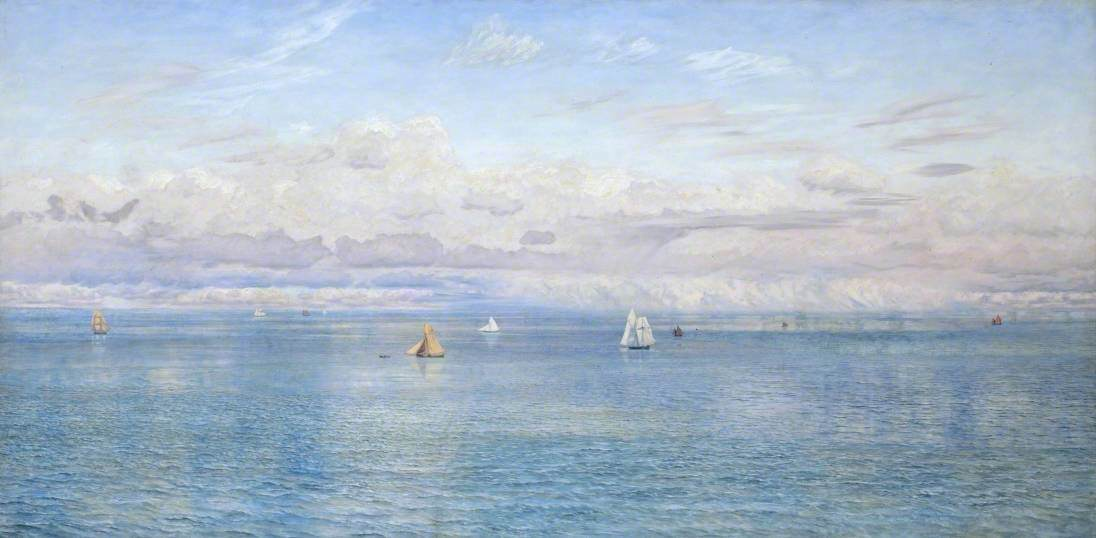
- Artist: John Brett
- Year: 1880
- Type: Oil on canvas, landscape painting
- Dimensions: 105.4 cm × 212.1 cm (41.5 in × 83.5 in)
- Location: Tate Britain, London

Britannia's Realm is an oil on canvas landscape painting by the British artist John Brett, from 1880. It is held at the Tate Britain, in London.

A seascape, it features a view of the Carmarthen Bay near Tenby, in Pembrokeshire. Brett was one of the best-known landscape painters associated with the Pre-Raphaelite Brotherhood. He often produced views of British coastal scenes.

The painting was displayed at the Royal Academy Exhibition of 1880 held at Burlington House. Today it is in the collection of the Tate Britain, having been acquired the same year as part of the Chantrey Bequest for £600.

== Bibliography ==
- Herrmann, Luke. Nineteenth Century British Painting. Charles de la Mare, 2000.
- Payne, Christiana. Where the Sea Meets the Land: Artists on the Coast in Nineteenth-century Britain. Sanson, 2007.
- Staley, Allen. Pre-Raphaelite Vision: Truth to Nature. Harry N. Abrams, 2004.
