= Tenby Fisherwoman =

Painting by William Powell Frith

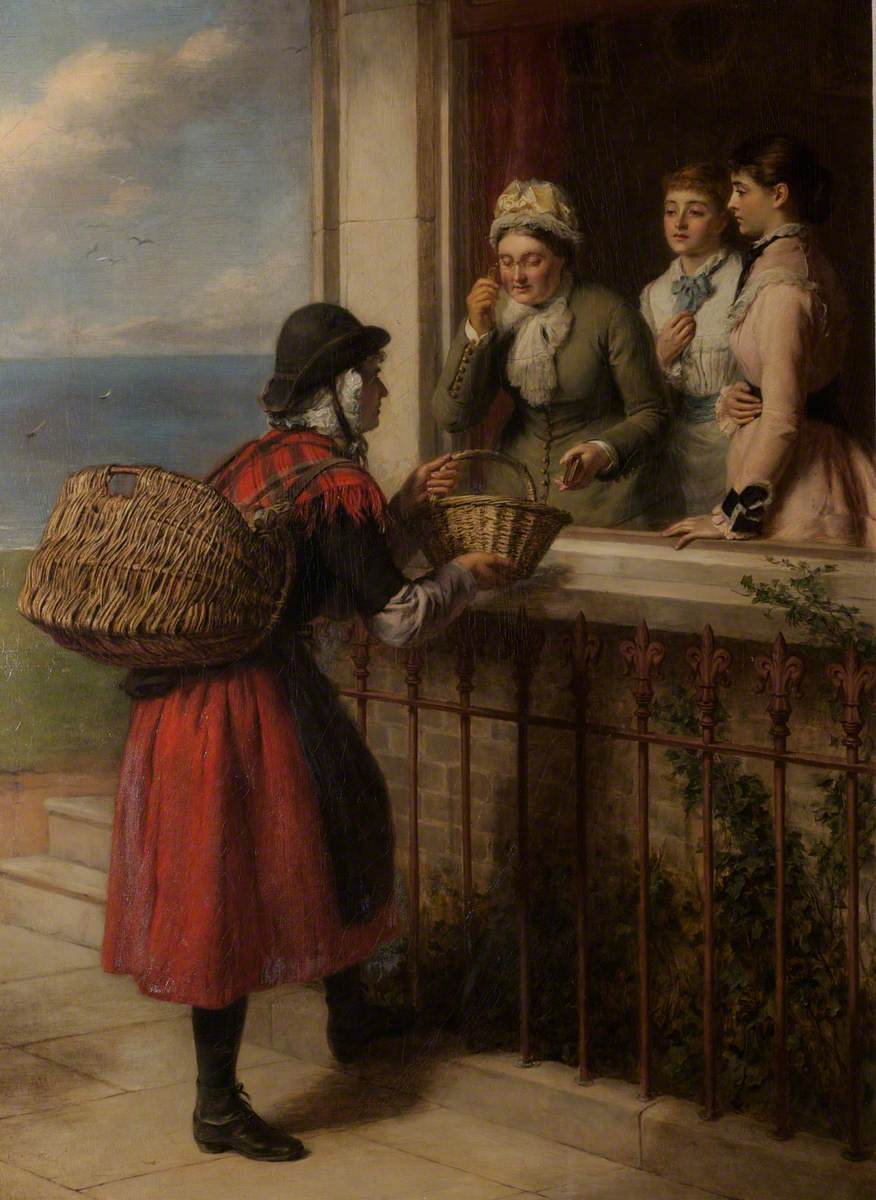
- Artist: William Powell Frith
- Year: 1880
- Type: Oil on canvas, genre painting
- Dimensions: 82 cm × 60 cm (32 in × 24 in)
- Location: Scolton Manor, Pembrokeshire

Tenby Fisherwoman is an 1880 oil painting by the British artist William Powell Frith. A genre painting set in the Welsh seaside town of Tenby, it was inspired by a visit Frith had made with his family the previous year.Despite the title the woman shown is actually an oyster seller from the village of Llangwm from across the River Cleddau. Oysterwoman regularly walked into Tenby to sell their wares.

Frith was a leading figure in British art during the Victorian era, often focusing on scenes of everyday life. Frith displayed the painting at the Royal Academy Exhibition of 1880 at Burlington House in London along with another picture A Tenby Prawn Seller. Today the painting is in the collection of Scolton Manor in Pembrokeshire.

== Bibliography ==
- Green, Richard & Sellars, Jane. William Powell Frith: The People's Painter. Bloomsbury, 2019.
- Walton, J.K & Borsay, Peter. Resorts and Ports: European Seaside Towns Since 1700. Channel View Publications, 2011.
- Wood, Christopher. William Powell Frith: A Painter and His World. Sutton Publishing, 2006.
