= James Aumonier =

English landscape painter

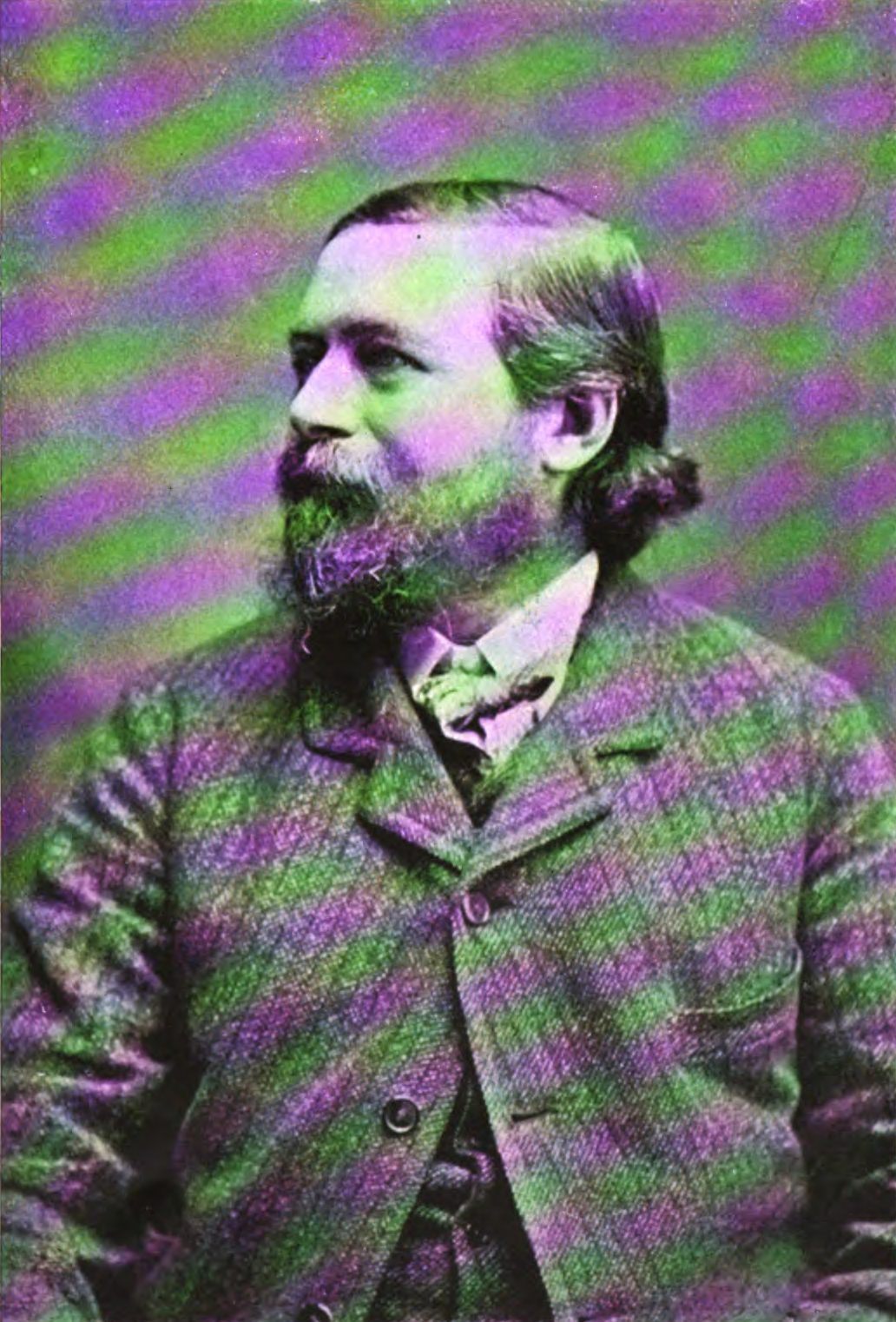
- Born: 9 April 1832; Camberwell
- Died: 4 October 1911 (aged 79); Hampstead
- Occupation: Painter, landscape painter, visual artist, drawer, designer

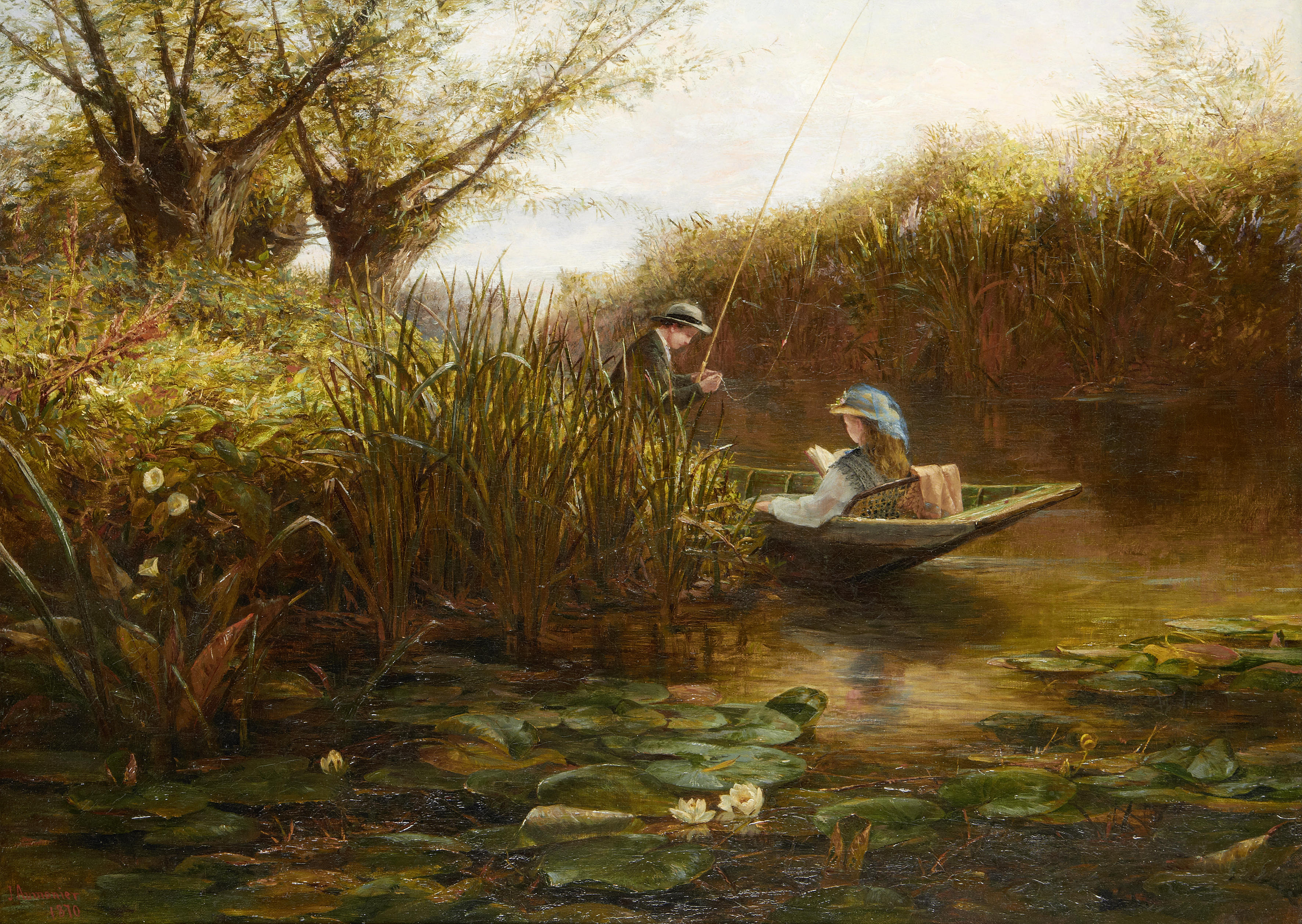
Where the Water Lilies Grow, James Aumonier

James Aumonier (1832–1911) was an English landscape painter.

== Life ==
Born in Camberwell, London on 9 April 1832, he was son of Henry Collingwood Aumonier, a jeweller, by his wife, Nancy Frances, daughter of George Stacy; a younger brother worked as an engraver, and a nephew Stacy Aumonier became a landscape painter and decorative designer. He was brought up at Highgate and High Barnet, and at 14 was hired by a business. He attended evening classes, first at the Birkbeck Institution, then known as the Mechanics' Institute, and subsequently at South Kensington, where he found employment as a designer of calicoes in a London firm.

In 1891 Aumonier visited Venice and the Venetian Alps. He became associate of the Royal Institute of Painters in Water-colours in 1876, and was one of the original members of the Institute of Oil Painters. In 1889 he was awarded a gold medal for water-colour in Paris, and a bronze medal for oil painting at Adelaide. He also received a silver medal at the Brussels exhibition in 1897. There was an exhibition of his water-colour drawings at the Leicester Galleries in 1908, and another of his work in oils as well at the Goupil Gallery in March 1912.

Aumonier died in London on 4 October 1911, and his remains were cremated at Woking.

== Works ==
Aumonier exhibited for the first time at the Royal Academy in 1871, but continued his work on calico until after 1873, when Sir Newton Mappin purchased a picture shown by him at the Royal Academy, An English Cottage; Home. He concentrated himself on peaceful scenes of the English countryside, especially with autumn tints or during late afternoon. His pictures included When the Tide is Out, The Silver Lining of the Cloud (both in the Royal Academy of 1895), In the Fen Country, The Old Sussex Farmstead, and Sunday Evening. Sheep Washing was in the Chantrey bequest collection at the Tate Gallery, which also owned his painting Black Mountains. Aumonier exhibited at the third annual exhibition held at the Carnegie Institute in Pittsburgh in 1898/9 his landscape "A Sussex Hayfield".

== Family ==
Aumonier married on 8 August 1863 at St. George's, Bloomsbury, Amelia, the daughter of James Wright, a gold beater, and had two sons and two daughters.
