= 1880 in art =

Events from the year 1880 in art.

== Events ==
- 3 May – The Royal Academy Exhibition of 1880 opens at Burlington House in London
- October – Vincent van Gogh enrolls in a beginners art course at the Académie Royale des Beaux-Arts in Brussels.
- Fifth Impressionist exhibition in Paris, at 10 rue des Pyramides. The realist painter Jean-François Raffaëlli is also invited by Degas to exhibit.
- Silver Studio founded by Arthur Silver in London for textile and wallpaper design.
- Anton Mauve paints Changing Pasture; his palette and usage of colour influences Vincent van Gogh.
- Michael Ancher marries fellow painter Anna Brøndum.
- National Gallery of Canada established in Ottawa.

== Awards ==
- Grand Prix de Rome, painting: Henri Lucien Doucet.
- Grand Prix de Rome, sculpture:
- Grand Prix de Rome, architecture:
- Grand Prix de Rome, music: Lucien Joseph Edouard Hillemacher.

== Works ==
Bartholdi's Lion of Belfort

- Frédéric Auguste Bartholdi – The Lion of Belfort
- Marie Bashkirtseff – Self-portrait
- Arnold Böcklin – Isle of the Dead (German: Die Toteninsel, first two versions)
- Marie Bracquemond – On the terrace at Sèvres
- John Brett – Britannia's Realm
- Thomas Brock – A Moment of Peril (equestrian bronze)
- Lady Butler – The Defence of Rorke's Drift
- Alexandre Cabanel – Phèdre
- Gustave Caillebotte
  - A Balcony
  - Boulevard des Italiens
  - Boulevard Seen from Above
  - The Bezique Game
  - In a Café
  - Interior
  - Interior, Woman reading
  - A refuge, boulevard Haussmann
  - Man on the balcony, boulevard Haussmann
  - Man with a top-hat, seated by a window
  - Nude on a divan
- Paul Cézanne – View of Auvers-sur-Oise
- Carl Conrads – Statue of Alexander Hamilton (granite, Central Park, New York)
- Pierre Auguste Cot – The Storm
- Alphonse-Marie-Adolphe de Neuville – The Defence of Rorke's Drift, 1879
- Edgar Degas – Mary Cassatt at the Louvre: The Etruscan Gallery (etching)
- Thomas Eakins – The Fairman Rogers Four-in-Hand
- Giovanni Fattori – Quadrato di Villafranca
- William Powell Frith – Tenby Fisherwoman
- Charles Gauthier – Cléopâtre (plaster)
- James Clarke Hook – Home with the Tide
- Daniel Huntington – Portrait of John Adams Dix
- Ivan Kramskoi
  - Sergey Botkin
  - Ivan Shishkin
- Edward Lear – The Plains of Lombardy from Monte Generoso (Ashmolean Museum, Oxford)
- Édouard Manet
  - Émilie Ambre as Carmen
  - A Bundle of Asparagus
  - A Sprig of Asparagus
- Albert Joseph Moore – Rose Leaves
- Adolph Alphonse de Neuville – The Defence of Rorke's Drift
- Frank O'Meara – Autumnal greys (Forest of Fontainbleau)
- William Quiller Orchardson – Napoleon on Board the Bellerophon
- Edward Poynter – A Visit to Aesculapius
- Pierre-Auguste Renoir
  - Portrait of Irène Cahen d'Anvers
  - By the Water
- Annie Robinson – Susan Isabel Dacre
- Dante Gabriel Rossetti – The Day Dream
- Fritz Schaper – Goethe Monument (Berlin)
- Viktor Vasnetsov – Flying Carpet
- Henry Tanworth Wells – Victoria Regina
- James McNeill Whistler
  - St Mark's, Venice
  - The Lagoon, Venice

== Births ==
- February 1 – C. T. Loo, Chinese-born art dealer (died 1957)
- February 3 – Frances Darlington, English relief sculpture (died 1940)
- February 8 – Franz Marc, German painter and printmaker, co-founder of Der Blaue Reiter (killed in action 1916)
- March 2 – Joseph Ehrismann, German-born painter and stained-glass maker (died 1937)
- March 21 – Hans Hofmann, German-born abstract expressionist painter and teacher (died 1966)
- April 4 – William Russell Flint, Scottish-born watercolourist (died 1969)
- April 7 – Alexander Bogomazov, Ukrainian painter, artist and modern art theoretician of Russian avant-garde (died 1930)
- May 6 – Ernst Ludwig Kirchner, German expressionist painter, co-founder of Die Brücke (suicide 1938)
- June 10 – André Derain, French Fauvist painter (died 1954)
- August 2
  - Arthur Dove, American painter (died 1946)
  - Philippe Joseph Henri Lemaire, French sculptor (born 1798)
- August 22 – George Herriman, American cartoonist (Krazy Kat) (died 1944)
- November 19 – Jacob Epstein, American-born British sculptor (died 1959)

== Deaths ==
- January 4 – Anselm Feuerbach, German classicist painter (born 1829)
- February 19 – Constantino Brumidi, American historicist fresco painter (born 1805)
- September 8 – Wilhelm August Rieder, Austrian painter and draughtsman (born 1796)
- October 10 – Giampietro Campana, Italian art collector (born 1808)
- November 20 – Léon Cogniet, French historical and portrait painter (born 1794)
- December 21 – Henry O'Neill, Irish illustrator and antiquarian (born 1798)
- date unknown – Nicolae Teodorescu, Moldavian, later Romanian church painter (muralist) (born 1797)
