= Pietro Bugiani =

Italian painter

Pietro Bugiani (Pistoia, 1905 - Florence, 1992) was an Italian painter.

== Biography ==
He initially trained with his father, a literature and violin teacher, and amateur painter. He would accompany his father and Cesare Gonfiantini, a pupil of Fattori, to paint outdoors as was common with the Macchiaioli painters. As an adolescent, he enrolled in Florence in the Scuola d’Arte applicata all’Industria (later Istituto d'Arte di Firenze). There he was recognized by professor Cavalieri and enrolled in the Academy of Fine Arts and Scuola Libera del Nudo. He met in 1920 con professor Michelucci, who helped guide further studies. In 1924, he began to exhibit. In 1925/26, he met Francesco Casorati in Turin. In 1929, he exhibited at the Mostra del Novecento Italiano. In 1930 he joined the faculty of Architecture at the Academy of Fine Arts in Florence. After the second world war, he became a noted restorer for the museums of Florence. He continued to teach at the Istituto d’Arte di Pistoia and the Liceo Artistico di Firenze. An exhibit of his works was held in the Palazzo Comunale of Pistoia from 21 December 2017 to 7 January 2018.
