= Villa Fabbricotti =

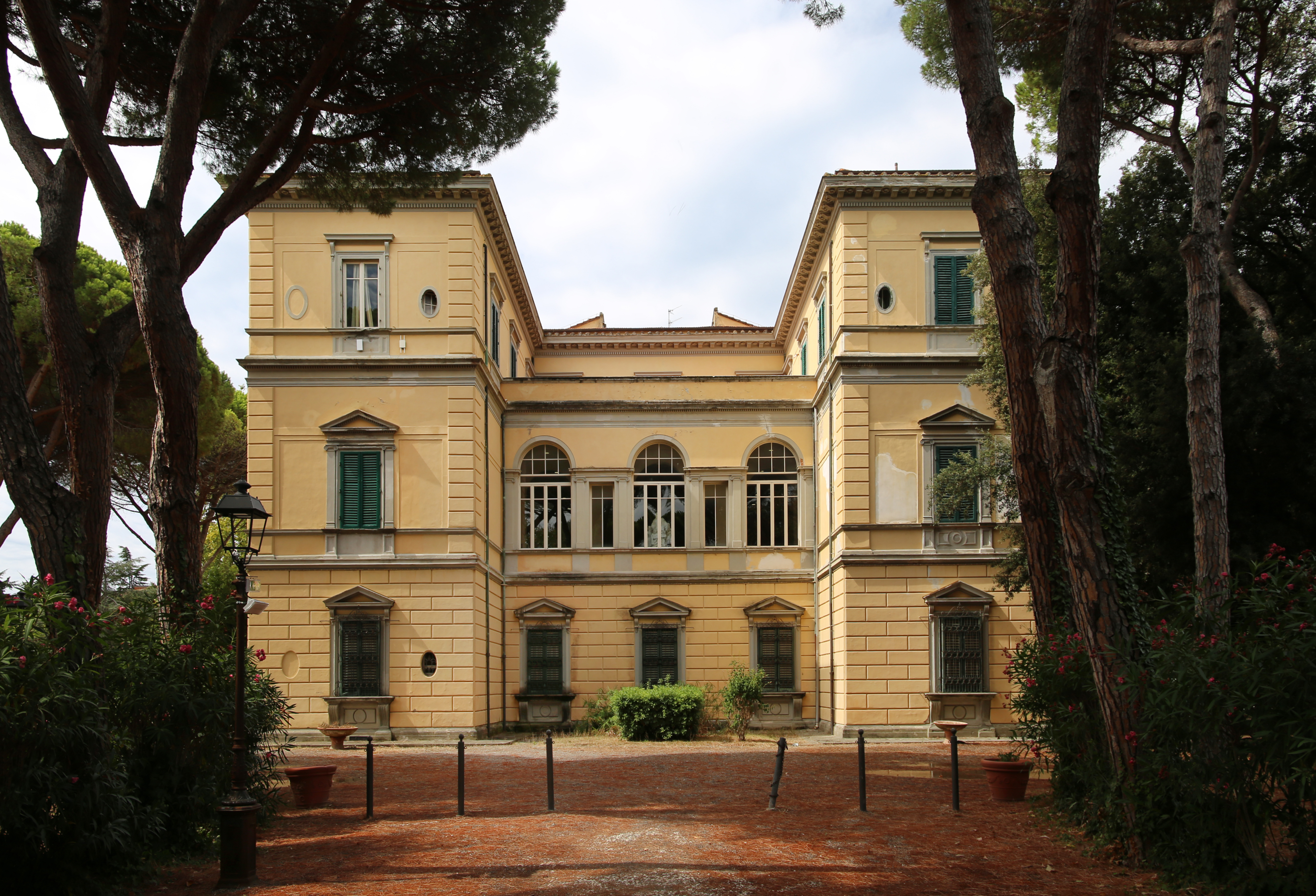

General information
- Address: Viale della Libertá, 30
- Town or city: Livorno
- Country: Italy
- Coordinates: 43.5365981°N 10.3167720°E
- Elevation: 2 metres (6.6 ft)
- Completed: 1881

Technical details
- Floor count: 2

Villa Fabbricotti is a villa in Livorno. It is currently used by the Biblioteca Labronica, one of the largest libraries in the city.

== History ==
The current structure of the villa dates back to 1881, when the preexisting structure was acquired by Bernardo Fabbricotti, form whom it derives its current denomination has been designed by architect Vincenzo Micheli and is inspired to renaissance architecture. The main entrances of the villa's park are on Viale Della Libertà and Piazza Giacomo Matteotti. In 1936 the villa was sold by Fabbricotti to the Comune of Livorno. The park was significantly reduced by the edification of several residential buildings nearby. The villa is now used as a library, the Biblioteca Labronica.

== Description ==
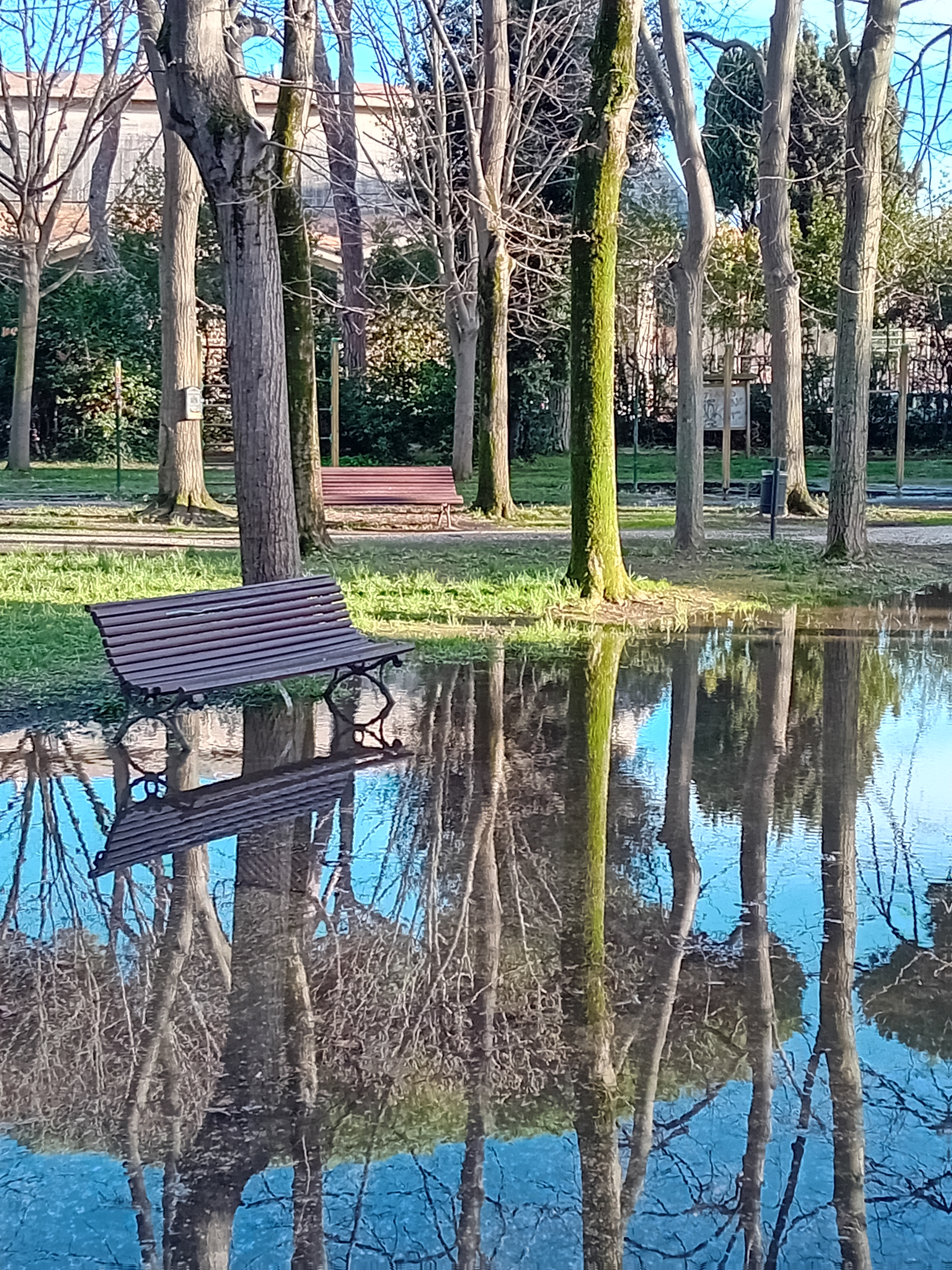
The park of Villa Fabbricotti

The villa takes up the themes of Renaissance architecture and refers to the design of another Labronica structure: Villa Mimbelli, also designed by Vincenzo Micheli. The exterior is characterized by some serlianas and large round windows that lighten the curtain wall, while the interior is structured around a monumental double staircase.

On the first floor is the sculpture Mother Educator, by Paolo Emilio Demi. At first it was hosted in the Soccorso church and in 1865 it was transported to the Grabau asylum; in 1950, after being provided with a new pedestal, it was moved to Villa Fabbricotti.

In the park of the villa there are several sculptures, such as a sculpture by Giovanni Paganucci and the monument to Alfredo Jeri, by Antonio Vinciguerra. In the park, for over half a century, was placed the statue of Giovanni Fattori was also placed, which originally stood between Piazza della Repubblica and the city's Cisternino: built in 1925 by Valmore Gemignani, after the war it was transferred to the park of the villa, to return in original site only in the summer of 2008. In the same year, work began to transfer some of the marbles which, before the Second World War, decorated the Armenian church of San Gregorio Illuminatore to the original site, the remains of which were largely demolished in the fifties; however, the transfer operation was only partial and, to this day, many other pieces of marble and statues still lie in the park of the villa.

In the green area there is also a fountain by Luigi Brizzolara, largely damaged, coming from the demolished Villa Attias. There is also a statue of the entrepreneur Gustavo Corridi, a work by Vincenzo Cerri, coming from the unsafe chapel of Sant'Edoardo and a bust dedicated to the Livorno painter Giovanni Bartolena.

Subsequently, in 2012, a bust was placed in memory of Mario Borgiotti, an artist of the Labronico Group, created by the painter and sculptor Massimo Lomi, nephew of the post-Macchiaiolo Giovanni, who was also honored with a bust inside the villa.

In 2018 the statue of the dog Snoopy was inaugurated, as testimony to his story, which saw him killed in Livorno on 4 August 2015 by a rifle shot while he was on the terrace of his home; it wants to raise human awareness on the issue of violence against animals.
