= Ruggero Panerai =

Italian painter (1862–1923)

Ruggero Panerai (Florence, March 19, 1862 – 1923) was an Italian painter.

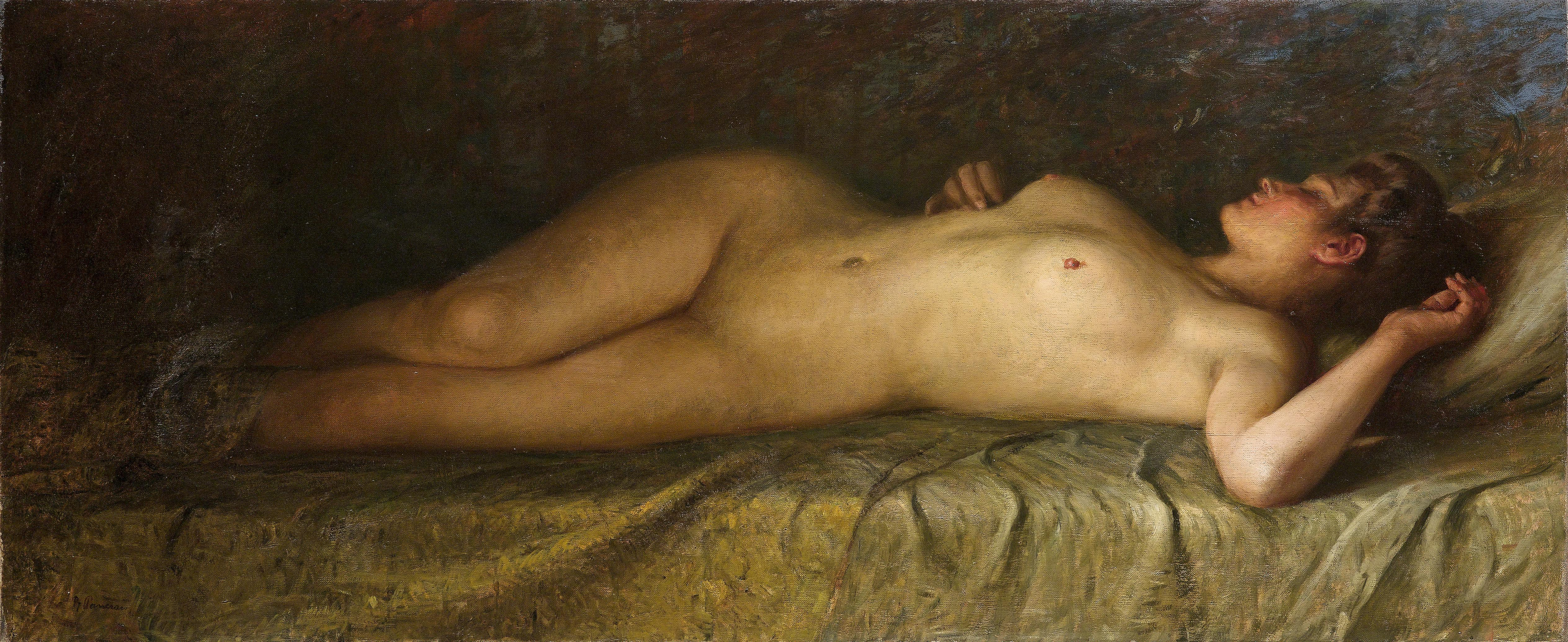
Woman Lying

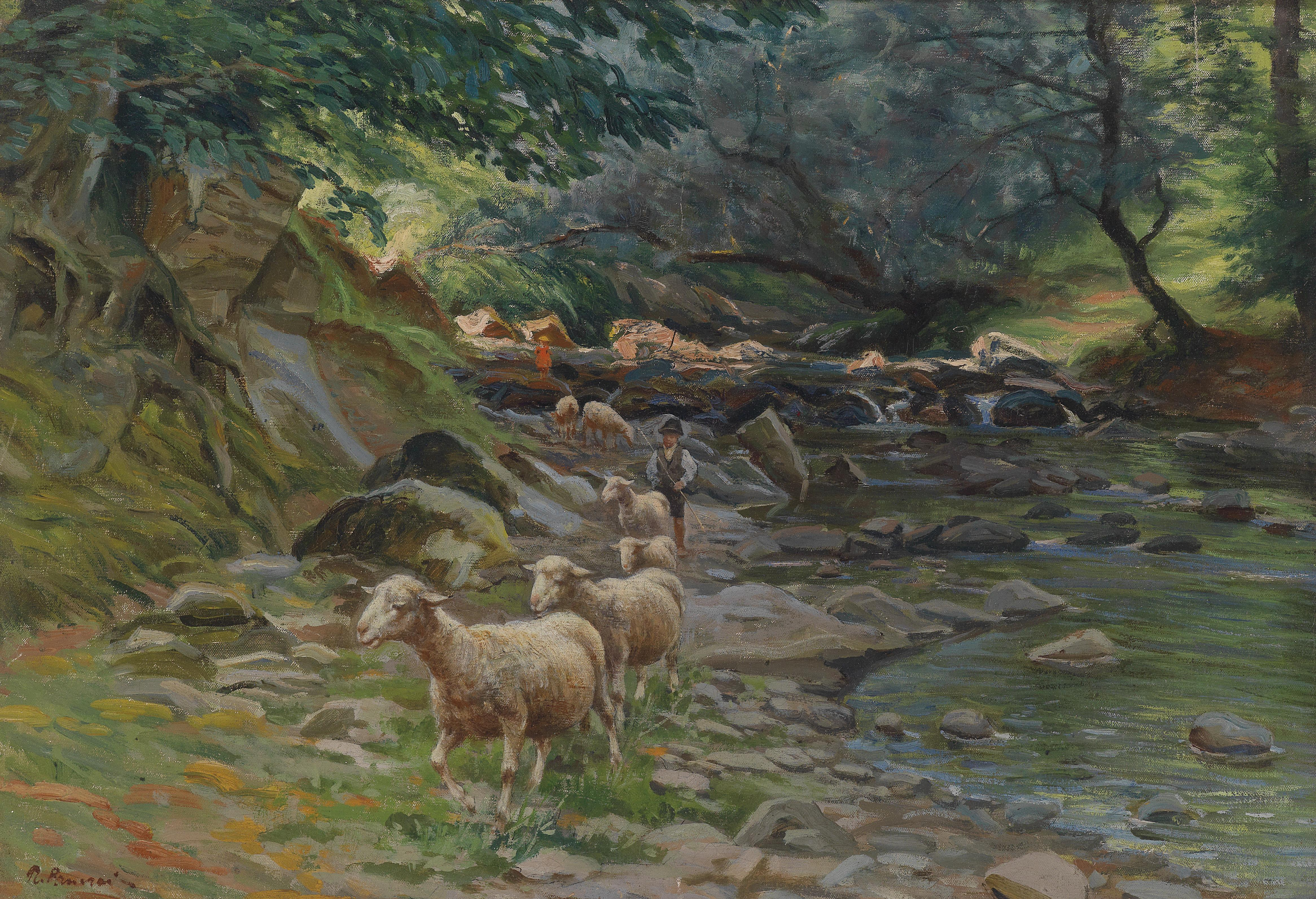
Small flock of sheep and shepherds on streambank.

== Biography ==
Born to a humble family, he began studies in 1877 at the Academy of Fine Arts of Florence, first studying ornament, then focusing on figure painting, and graduating in 1881. He then entered the studio of Giovanni Fattori. He specialized in painting military themes and the daily life of peasants in the Maremma. He was influenced by the Macchiaioli movement.

In 1883 he won a contest at the Florentine academy to win a stipend of 1000 lire. His first major painting, titled The Guado, was exhibited at Venice in 1887, and acquired by the Galleria moderna of Rome. However it was transferred to the galleria Pisani in Florence. Again in 1883, he won the Fumagalli competition in Milan a canvas titled: The cavallo malato, depicting a rural scene in the Maremma of Tuscany.

For the 1888 Exhibition of Bologna and the 1889 Exhibition of Paris, Panerai painted another large canvas, depicting Mazzeppa, again a study of horsemen of the Maremma. Panerai was named professor of the Royal Academy of Bologna, and Correspondent Professor of the Accademia of Florence.
