= Cowboys and Herds in the Maremma =

Painting by Giovanni Fattori

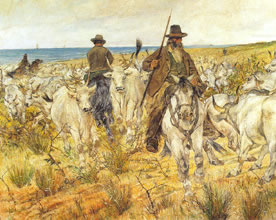
- Artist: Giovanni Fattori
- Year: 1893
- Medium: Oil on canvas
- Dimensions: 200 cm × 300 cm (79 in × 120 in)
- Location: Museo Civico Giovanni Fattori; Livorno

Cowboys and Herds in the Maremma is an oil-on-canvas painting by the Italian artist Giovanni Fattori, signed and dated 1893. It is held in the Museo Civico Giovanni Fattori, in Livorno, which also houses two preparatory drawings for the work. Another preparatory sketch is in the Uffizi, in Florence.

== History ==
Fattori also produced Cowboys and Flocks in Maremma (1894), Flock Herders (1894) and Head of a Cowboy on similar subjects – the third of these was exhibited in a Fattori retrospective exhibition in Florence in 1987. Cowboys was on the largest size of canvas available to him, which he only otherwise used for battle scenes and Market at San Godenzo. He exhibited it at the Venice Biennale in 1903, the Rome Biennale in 1921, the retrospective of Fattori's work in 1953, the Florence exhibition on the Macchiaioli in 1976 and the Il lavoro dell'uomo da Goya a Kandinskij at the Vatican (1991–1992).

== Description ==
Fattori's palette in this painting is basically composed of yellowish greys. The outlines of the figures are marked by a darker gray line: a subtle but strong mark, which appears almost etched into the canvas. The viewers gaze calms down in the distant segment of the sea, diluted with pale blue, with a small pink sail. There are three cowboys in the composition: the first is an old man, facing, in the foreground, with a flowing white beard; the second is seen from the back and the other one is seen riding in the distance. They are three dark and imposing spots, above a tangle of twigs that sprout from the crushed and disorganized sands, inside a disorderly sequence of heads, horns, tails and sides of restless white cattle.

Fattori condemned as decadent the symbolist aestheticism of the late 19th century. The works of his last years instead express his natural inclination to represent reality. The current painting is imposing, almost aggressive.
