= Cousin Argia =

Painting by Giovanni Fattori

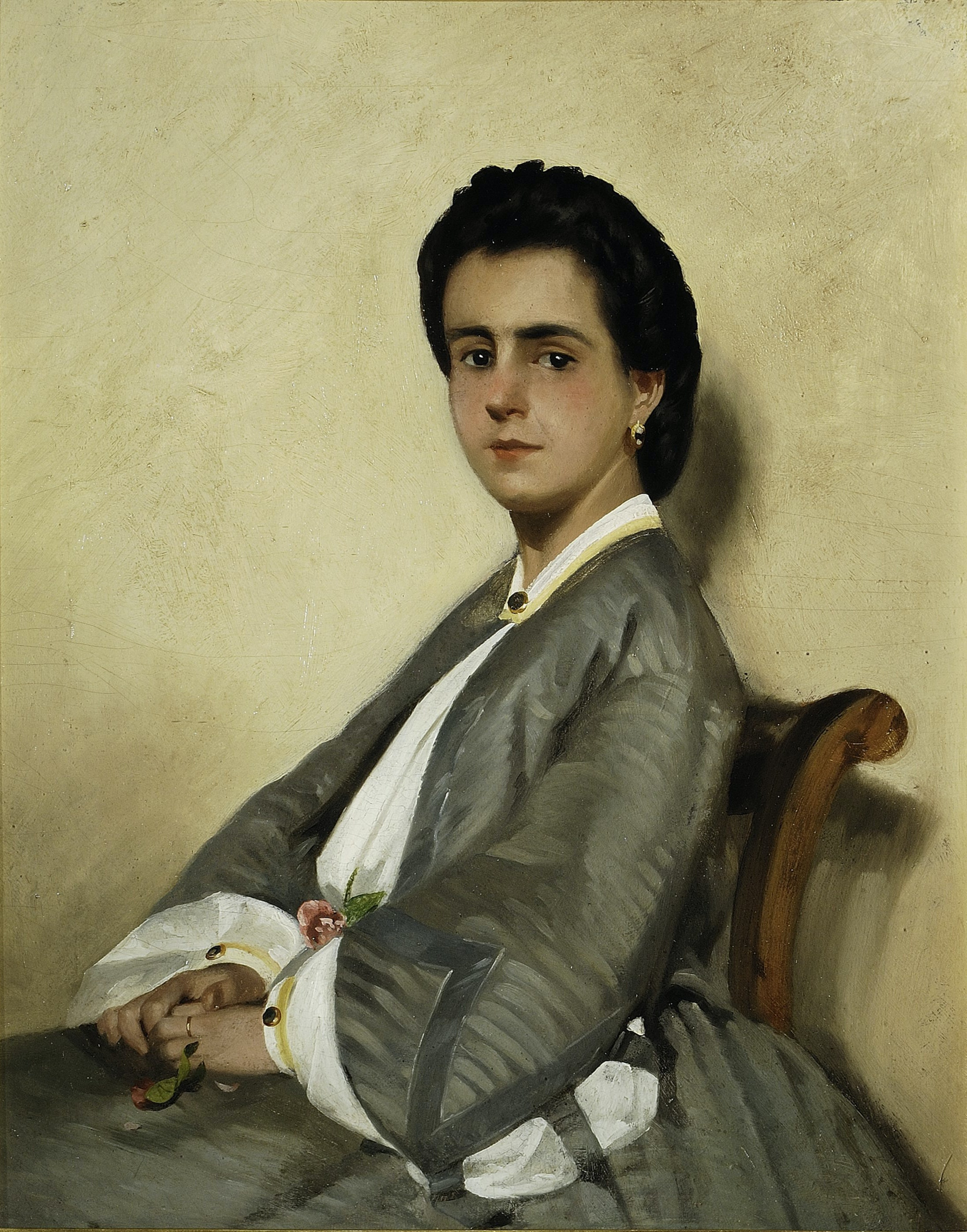
- Artist: Giovanni Fattori
- Year: 1861
- Medium: oil on card
- Dimensions: 36.2 cm × 29 cm (14.3 in × 11 in)
- Location: Gallery of Modern Art; Florence

Cousin Argia (Italian: La cugina Argia) is an 1861 oil-on-card painting by the Italian artist Giovanni Fattori, now in the Gallery of Modern Art in Florence. A label on the reverse is inscribed "Gio. Fattori alla sua cugina Argia. Anno 1861" (Giovanni Fattori to his dear cousin Argia. The year 1861), but this may not be in the artist's hand, and no Argia is known in his family.

== Description ==
This painting is one of Fattori's first significant works, showing the effects of his academic training giving way to the new Macchiaioli aesthetics. The subject of the portrait is believed to be the painter's cousin, Argia, who poses seated, almost in profile, silhouetted against the monochrome backdrop of a plastered wall. The woman's posture has been conscientiously studied by the artist and is influenced by the recent trend of the photographic portrait. The warm and golden shades of the wall give vitality to the figure, already endowed with its corporality thanks to the effective combination of spots of different shades and the varied chiaroscuro.

Argia, depicted with her hands placed on her lap, gently holding a delicate little flower, wears an elaborate gray dress and a white undershirt. The strength of character and psychological penetration of the painting is remarkable: Fattori gives the gaze of a supposed blood relative a flash of great vitality with the application of a touch of white inside the pupil, to simulate the corneal light reflection. With this expedient, the painter manages to give the sitter a penetrating and authoritative attitude, tempered only by the sweetness of her features and the faint hint of a smile directed at the viewer.
