= Rocca delle Caminate =

Medieval castle in Emilia-Romagna, Italy

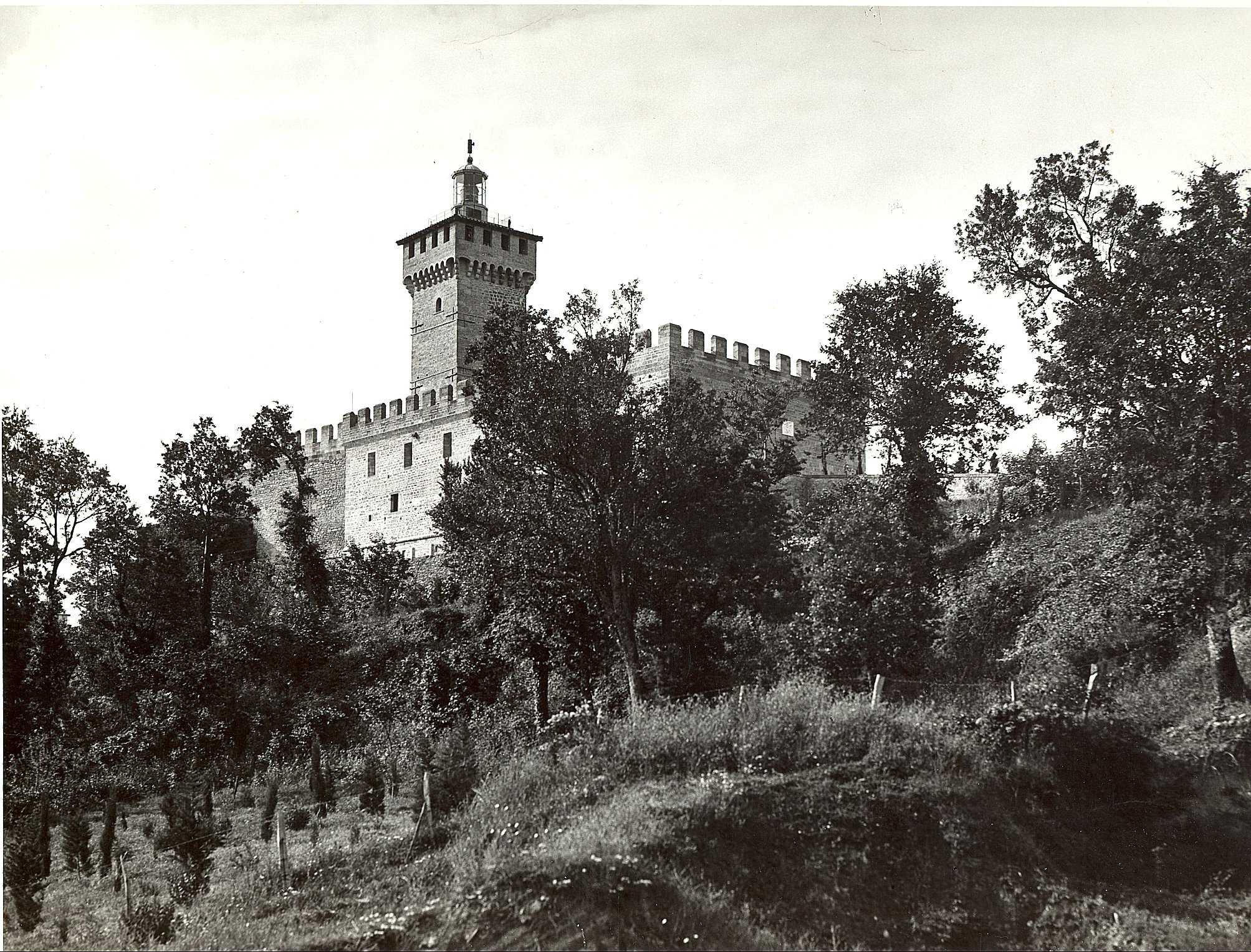
Rocca delle Caminate in 1939

Rocca delle Caminate is a medieval castle located in Meldola, around 7 miles (11 km) from Predappio in the Emilia-Romagna region of Italy. It functioned as the summer home of Benito Mussolini, who was born in Predappio.

== History ==
The Rocca delle Caminate was built in the 10th century, most likely on the site of a Roman fort.

In 1927, the castle was donated to Benito Mussolini. It was then renovated by interior designer Guido Malagola Cappi. The external renovations included the addition of a lighthouse, which shone a powerful light whenever the Italian leader was present.

It was here that Mussolini, during a brief sojourn in March 1933, composed the first version of the Four-Power Pact.

It became Mussolini's summer residence in the area and he held meetings with dignitaries during World War II, such as Romanian Foreign Minister Mihai Antonescu, while staying there. The castle was also used as a site of torture, with members of the Italian resistance movement being beaten or killed there. At the end of the war, it was partly destroyed by Allied troops in search of treasure, with the rest of the furniture being removed by locals.

Following the war and Mussolini's death, his widow Rachele made efforts to sell the castle.

=== 21st century ===
Calls have been made for the castle's lighthouse to be restored to attract visitors, and Meldola mayor Gian Luca Zattini suggested parts of the castle be converted into a restaurant. The project was approved by the local government in 2017, but some critics suggested it could become a pilgrimage point for modern Fascists and seen as a celebration of Mussolini.
