= The Italian Camp at the Battle of Magenta =

1862 painting by Giovanni Fattori

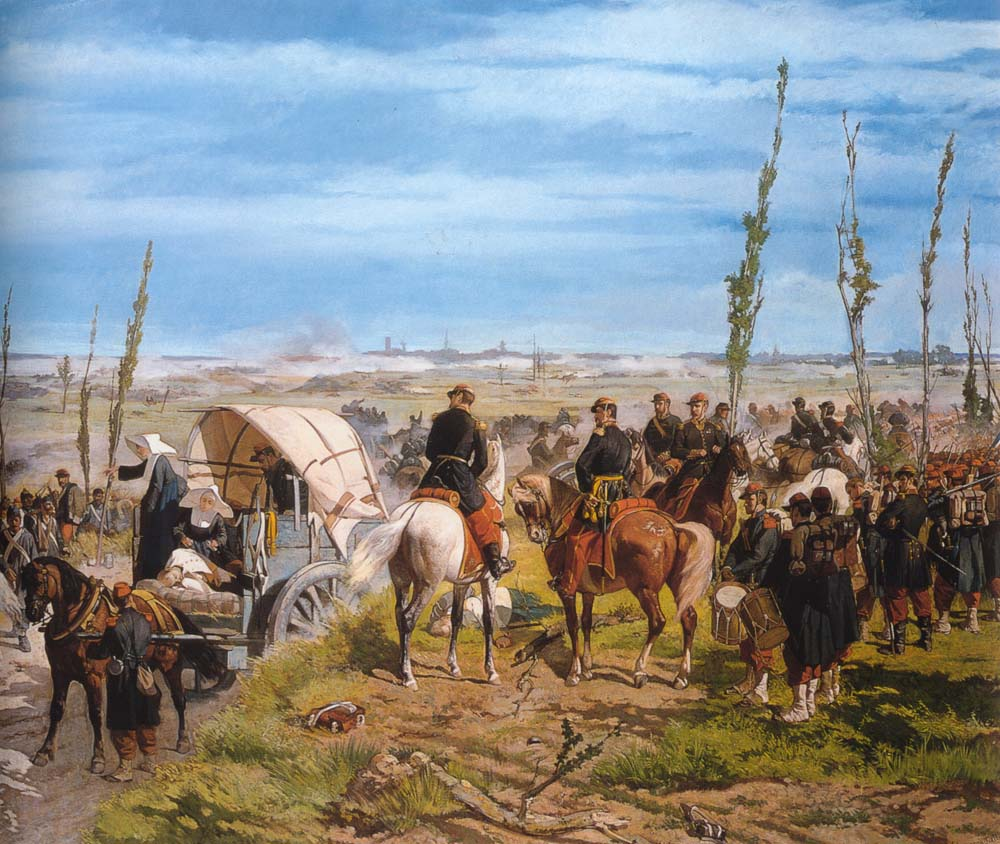
- Artist: Giovanni Fattori
- Year: 1862
- Medium: oil on canvas
- Dimensions: 232 cm × 348 cm (91 in × 137 in)
- Location: Gallery of Modern Art; Florence

The Italian Camp at the Battle of Magenta is an oil on canvas painting by Italian painter Giovanni Fattori, from 1862. It is held in the Gallery of Modern Art in the Palazzo Pitti, in Florence. It shows a scene from the battle of Magenta on 4 June 1859 during the Second Italian War of Independence.

== History ==
At the end of 1859 Fattori decided to participate in the competition announced by Bettino Ricasoli for the execution of four paintings depicting the main military episodes of the Italian Risorgimento: Curtatone, Palestro, San Martino and Magenta. The artist chose to depict the battle of Magenta, fought on 4 June 1859, during the second war of independence, between the Austrians and the Franco-Piedmontese and which ended with the victory of the latter. The clash finally opened a passage for the Franco-Piedmontese troops to conquer the Lombard territory, even if the blood tribute paid was large, among the 100 000 soldiers who took part in the fight there were more than 6000 victims. Fattori then presented two sketches to the judging commission, which declared him the winner and commissioned him to execute the painting.

Fattori painted the vast canvas of The Italian camp at the battle of Magenta (2.32 × 3.48 m) with great diligence, bringing it to completion in 1862. The French soldiers were painted with great precision, also because in 1859 some garrisons of that nation passed through Florence. To give greater truthfulness to the painting, moreover, Fattori personally went to the places of combat in Magenta, free of charge thanks to the commission of the painting.

== Description ==
The painting represents one of the best-known episodes of the Second Italian War of Independence, namely the Battle of Magenta. Fattori's representative choice, however, shifts the view to a particular moment of the battle: in fact, it is not the heroic aspect of it that is depicted, but the dignified return of the wounded soldiers to the rear to be assisted by the nurses. The work, devoid of celebratory intent, therefore privileges the dimension of piety, with which Fattori demonstrates to the observer the direct consequences, in terms of suffering and destruction, of the war.

The interplay of subjects is balanced by an apparent tranquility given by the officers in the foreground who carefully follow the return of the wounded, expertly coordinated by a diligence equipped with two nursing nuns, in charge of assisting the more seriously wounded, lying on a chariot. The corpses of two soldiers also lie on the pavement of the path. The right side is occupied by a series of troops lined up who, watching the funeral procession of their companions from afar, pay them silent homage before going to the front. On the left, right next to the stagecoach, are the wounded soldiers who, still managing to walk, independently return to the rear following a man with a bandaged head advancing on a tired-footed white horse. The only element to denounce the battle is relegated to the background of the painting: here, in fact, we find the profile of the battered Magenta, where the fumes from the cannons still suggest that the battle is still ongoing but is coming to an end. The sky, of an intense blue, is crossed by some spring clouds, which open towards infinity, expanding the perspective of the painting and at the same time allowing the horizons of the viewer to broaden.

The composition, sober and balanced, is structured on horizontal lines, which suggest a sensation of static nature, however compromised by the dynamism of other elements (such as the horses), useful for transmitting the tension of the clash to the observer. The depth of the landscape is instead rendered with the addition of trees, the only fully vertical elements of the canvas. From a stylistic point of view, the painting cannot yet be described as fully Macchiaioli: although the color has already been applied to the canvas with extensive horizontal backgrounds, the volumes and distances are rendered with the traditional chiaroscuro. It is a style that harmoniously the blends academic tradition with the nascent Macchiaioli style.
