= Luigi Michelacci =

Italian painter (1879–1959)

Luigi Michelacci (23 July 1879 in Meldola – 19 February 1959 in Florence) was an Italian painter. He painted rural and village scenes, often using only earthy colors.

== Biography ==
He moved to Florence in 1891 with his family and studied under Giovanni Fattori. During his career, he lived in Venice, Paris, and Milan. He was named Correspondent professor of Painting at the Academy of Fine Arts, Florence.
