= Fabio Lombardi =

Fabio Lombardi (born in 1961) is an Italian ethnomusicologist and organologist who studied, at the Bologna University, with Roberto Leydi, Tullia Magrini and the organologist Febo Guizzi. Born in Meldola, Romagna, in the 1980s he made an ethnic musical field research in Emilia-Romagna, near Forlì and along the Bidente valley (Meldola, Cusercoli, Bertinoro, Predappio, Forlimpopoli, Civitella, Galeata, Santa Sofia, Bagno di Romagna) which has contributed to a better knowledge of Italian ethnic music (music of Italy), particularly regarding musical instruments: he discovered some unknown ethnic instruments (ethnic instrument) both in Italy and Europe. For example, see: a type of mirliton improperly named "Ocarina" kazoo. Other Lombardi's works are on the local history of Meldola, Riccione, Forlì and other topics.
