= Roman Carts =

Painting by Giovanni Fattori

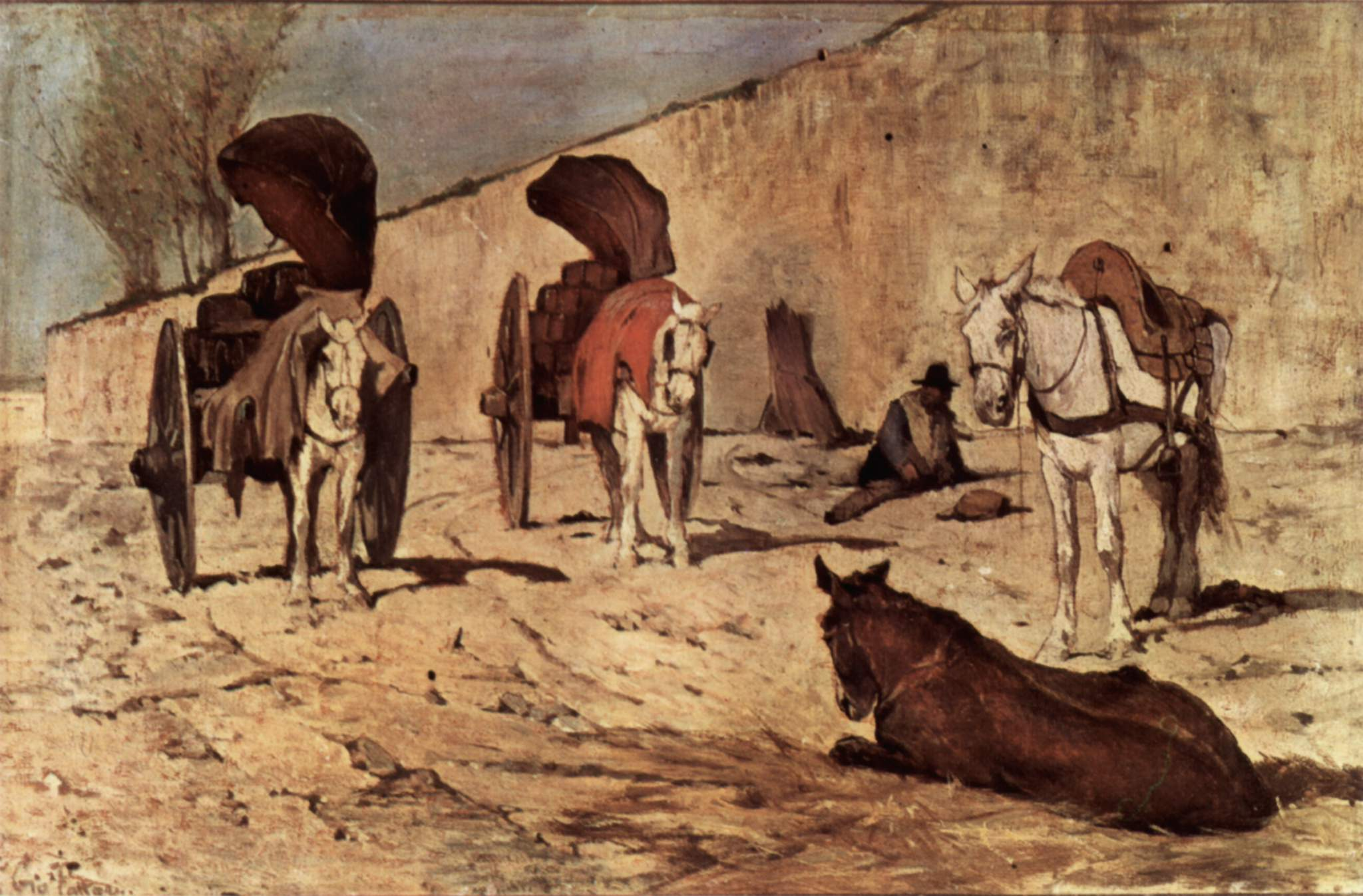
- Artist: Giovanni Fattori
- Year: c. 1872–1873
- Medium: oil on panel
- Dimensions: 21 cm × 31 cm (8.3 in × 12 in)
- Location: Galleria d'Arte Moderna, Florence

Roman Carts (Italian - Barrocci romani) is an oil-on-panel painting by the Italian artist Giovanni Fattori, painted during a stay in Rome, c. 1872–1873. It is now in the Galleria d'Arte Moderna, in the Palazzo Pitti, in Florence.

== Description ==
Made during his stay in Rome in 1873, the canvas depicts a roadside scene in which there are four exhausted horses on a summer day. One is sitting on the ground, another has a saddle and the last two are still pulling the barroccio, a two-wheeled vehicle used for the transport of goods. There is only one man in the scene, portrayed in the background: he is the master of the horses and he is caught while he is resting, exhausted like the beasts.

In the background there is a yellowish wall calcined by the sun, seen in transversal perspective, which schematically cuts the horizon and highlights the vastness of the space. The wall, characterized by a perfect geometry, presents a great volumetric tension and being suddenly interrupted, it restores the idea of a blocked time.

From a technical point of view, the characters, described in light and uniform tones, are volumetrically highlighted by the relationship between the drawing and the brushstrokes. The scene is shown on a very intense light and the sensation that derives from it, motionless and sad, is that of suspending life during a sultry summer day.
