= Enrico Lombardi =

Italian painter and writer (born 1958)

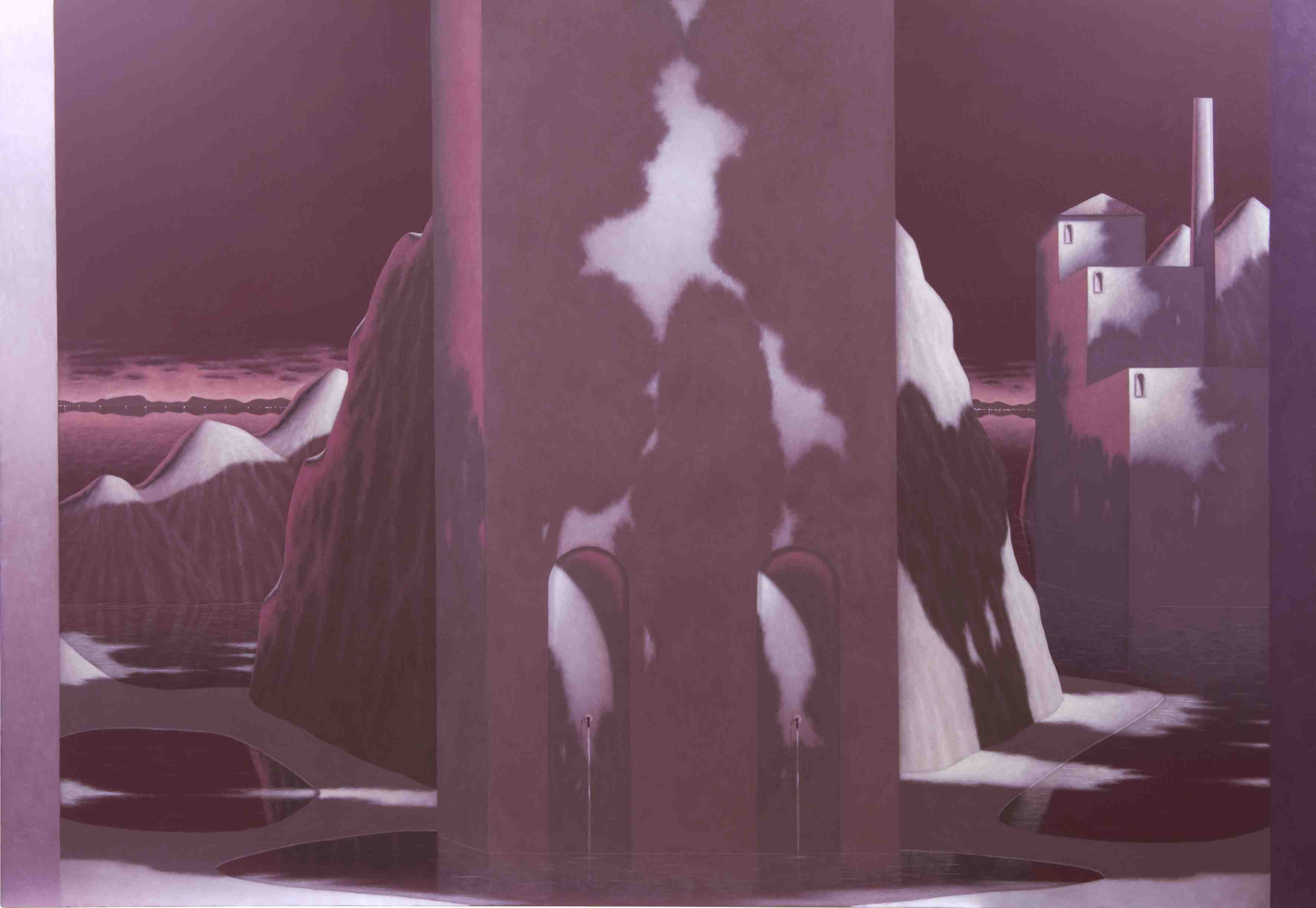
- Born: Enrico Lombardi; 17 January 1958; Meldola, Italy
- Education: Accademia di Belle Arti, Bologna
- Website: http://www.lombardienrico.it

Enrico Lombardi is an Italian painter and writer. He currently lives in Forlì, Italy, and he has been exhibited both in Italy and abroad. His works are noted for a theoretical reflection about image status shown on the "books" written by him, edited in publications on art, and essays by contemporary artists.

Having expressed himself through geometric abstraction and informal painting from the late '80s, he achieved a synthesis of modern and contemporary art, using images of Italian specific tradition - the centuries '300 and '400 - in which tradition, innovation, abstract way, form and conceptual way are looking for an almost paradoxical form of synthesis. His landscapes are made of fluctuating fields, empty houses that are out of proportion, quiet and rich in creepy shadows that create a disturbing sort of visual paradox.

== Biography ==
Graduated in painting at the Academy of Fine Arts in Bologna in 1984 with Prof. Maurizio Bottarelli. He designed and produced 3 solo exhibitions at the gallery Forni in Bologna and Milan (2000, 2002 and 2006), two anthologies at the gallery Wimmer Montpellier (1999) and the Gallery of Arts in Bologna (1997), "Distances" Apt (2004 ), "The gold of memory" at the Art Bank Gallery, London (2005).

He was invited by the art critic Alessandro Riva in 2004 in take part to the art group "Italian Factory" to the new Italian figuration: he will participate in "The New Italian Art Scene" at the Museum of Taipei (2007), a "new figuration to be continued ..." the Foundation Borroni (2008), "Rumors" Arsenal of Turin (2008) and "No Landscape" at the Fondazione Bandera (2009).

In 2006 he releases "Voices in the dark", the second volume of The Papers of Italian Factory, published by Charta, with a story created by the writer Edoardo Albini. In 2007 began the collaboration and friendship between him and philosopher Rocco Ronchi; the bilingual monograph "Il grido silenzioso", published by Electa, edited by the philosopher and his staff has been presented to the Museum of Forlì.

In the same year he was invited by Vittorio Sgarbi to participate in the exhibition "Italian Art 1968/2007. Painting." A selection of his theoretical writings appears in the book "At the end of the world. Philosophy, aesthetics, psychopathology" edited by Federico Leoni, Mauro Maldonado (Ed. Daedalus 2002) and on several of his monographic catalogs.

In 2009 Lombardi participated in the exhibition "Pittura d'Italia" on the new Italian painting, invited by the art critic Marco Goldin, held in Rimini along with the collection of the Boston Museum of Fine Art and the exhibition "Italia dipinta" at the IULM University of Milan, curated by his students and attested by Catalogue edited by Silvana Editoriale.

At the end of 2009 Lombardi opened his exposition named wn "Il tempo dell'ombra", sponsored by the Culture and Art Museum of Ravenna, curated by the art critic Chiara Canali and presented by the poet Antonella Anedda. In 2010 began a new collaboration with the Blackheath Gallery in London.

In 2011 Enrico Lombardi has been invited to third edition of "Memorial Award Maretti.Valerio Riva" held in the spaces of the Pecci Museum in Prato and 54th International Art Exhibition of the Venice Biennale curated by Vittorio Sgarbi, chosen by the Italian philosopher Carlo Sini at the Arsenal Corderie in Venice.

Museum of Conegliano, Museum "MAR" of Ravenna, Pinacoteca San Domenico of Forlì and the Davis Museum in Barcelona are collecting his works.

The Italian critics and writers Marco Goldin, Michael Loffredo, Nicola Micieli, Claudio Spadoni, Marco Di Capua, Alessandro Riva, Vittorio Sgarbi and Chiara Canali have dedicated him essays and texts.

He worked with poets and philosophers such as Rocco Ronchi, Fulvio Abbate, Umberto Fiori, Silvia Lagorio, Federico Leoni, Edoardo Albinati, Antonella Anedda, and Carlo Sini.
