= A Sprig of Asparagus =

1880 painting by Édouard Manet

- L'Asperge (French)
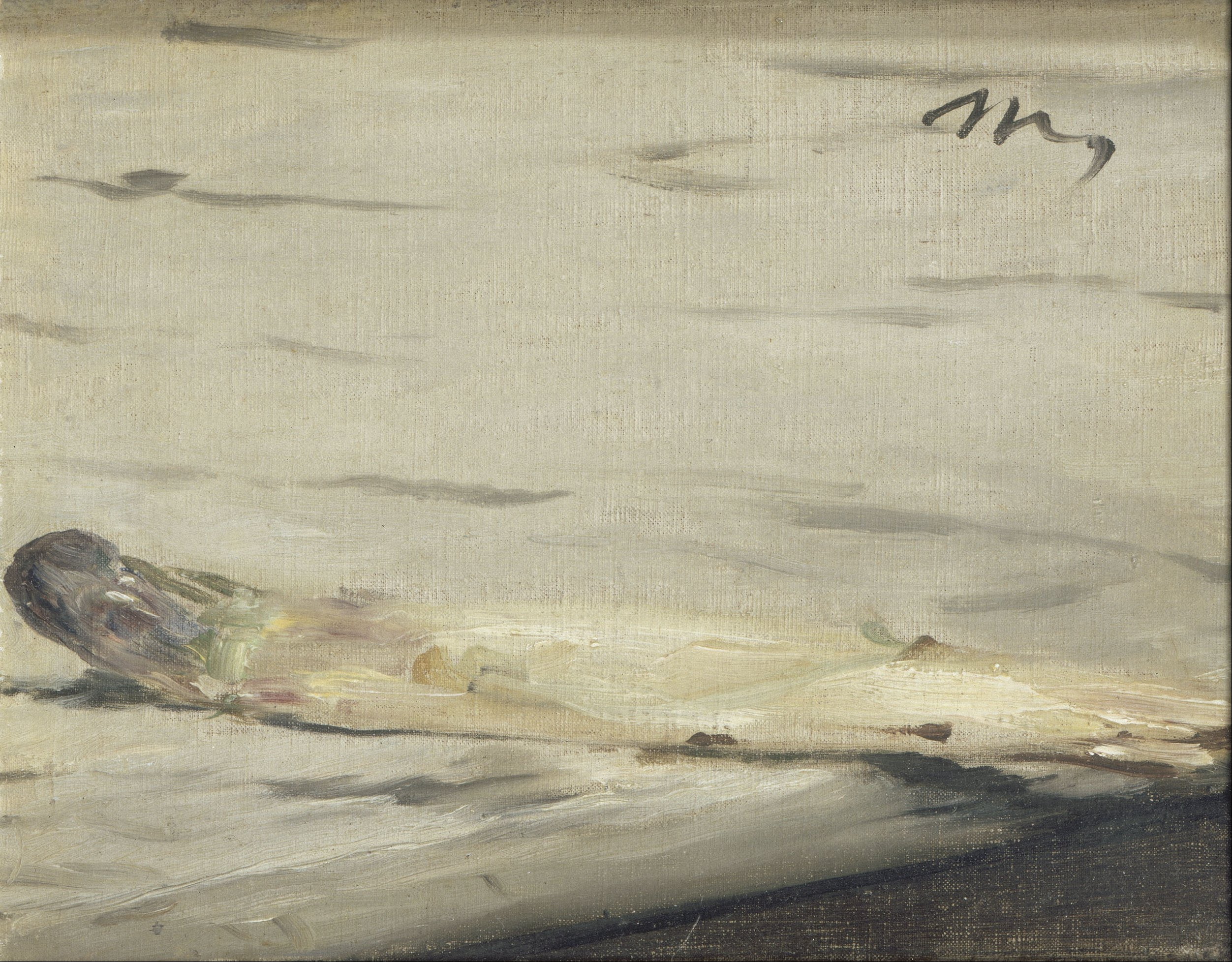
- Artist: Édouard Manet
- Year: 1880
- Medium: oil on canvas
- Dimensions: 16.9 cm × 21.9 cm (6.7 in × 8.6 in)
- Location: Musée d'Orsay, Paris

A Sprig of Asparagus (L'Asperge) is an 1880 oil on canvas painting by Édouard Manet, signed at the top right. It is now in the Musée d'Orsay.

In 1880, Charles Ephrussi, an art collector and patron of the arts, commissioned Manet to paint A Bundle of Asparagus for 800 francs. Ephrussi, however, sent 1,000 francs instead. In response, Manet created this smaller work, A Sprig of Asparagus, and sent it to Ephrussi with a note that humorously stated: "There was one [sprig] missing from your bunch."

Art historians have interpreted the anecdote as a sign of Manet's ability to blend wit with social and artistic gestures. By painting an additional work to acknowledge the overpayment, Manet transformed a standard commercial transaction into a symbolic exchange. The act also reinforced his image as a refined and gracious artist, appreciated for his humor and sensitivity to the nuances of patronage.

== Artistic analysis ==
The composition of A Sprig of Asparagus is spare, featuring a single stalk resting on a light marble surface. The choice of background and the asparagus itself emphasize tonal subtleties, texture, and the precision of brushwork. The neutral marble background contrasts with the muted green and violet tones of the asparagus tip, directing attention to its subtle details.

Art historian Carol M. Armstrong describes the work as a study in reductionism, focusing on the relationship between the painted subject and its artistic representation rather than its physical reality. She notes that the painting "declares its own paintedness," blending the asparagus and marble surface into a unified yet self-contained visual experience.

The painting deviates from conventional still-life traditions, combining restraint with liveliness to capture the viewer's attention. Georges Bataille described the painting as "still, certainly, but full of life," emphasizing Manet's ability to animate mundane objects with vitality. Additionally, the painting engages with themes of illusionism and value, challenging traditional associations between art and economic worth. By creating a painted substitute for a missing asparagus stalk, Manet humorously explored the equivalence between real objects and their artistic representations.

== Connection to other works ==
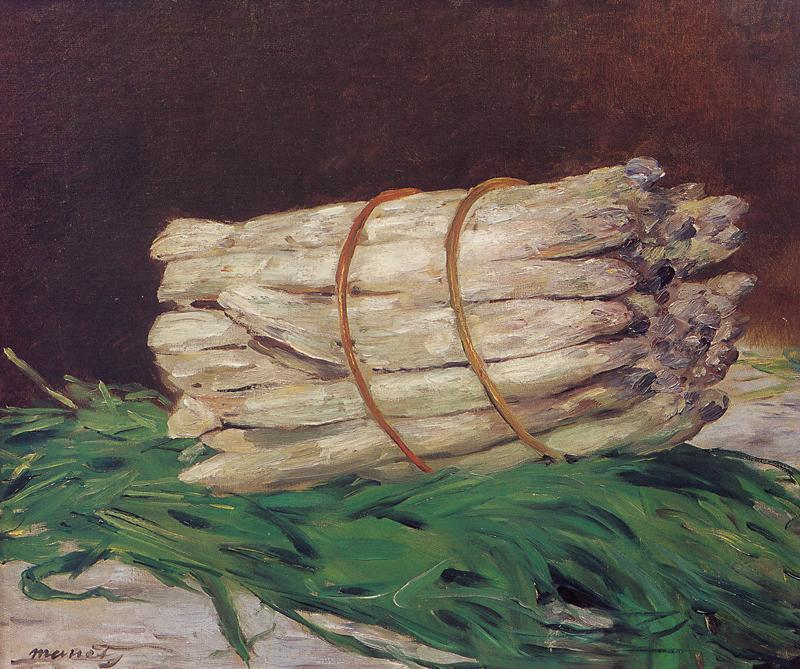
The companion piece A Bundle of Asparagus, also by Manet, 1880, Wallraf Richartz Museum, Cologne

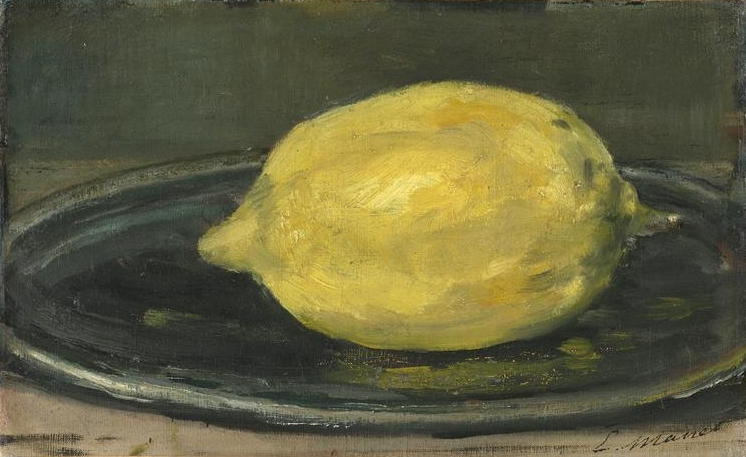
Édouard Manet, The Lemon, 1880.

This painting serves as a companion to A Bundle of Asparagus, which features multiple stalks arranged on a dark background. The larger painting employs a dramatic contrast of light and shadow, reminiscent of seventeenth-century Dutch still lifes. In contrast, A Sprig of Asparagus focuses on a singular object and adopts a lighter palette, creating a more intimate and informal composition.

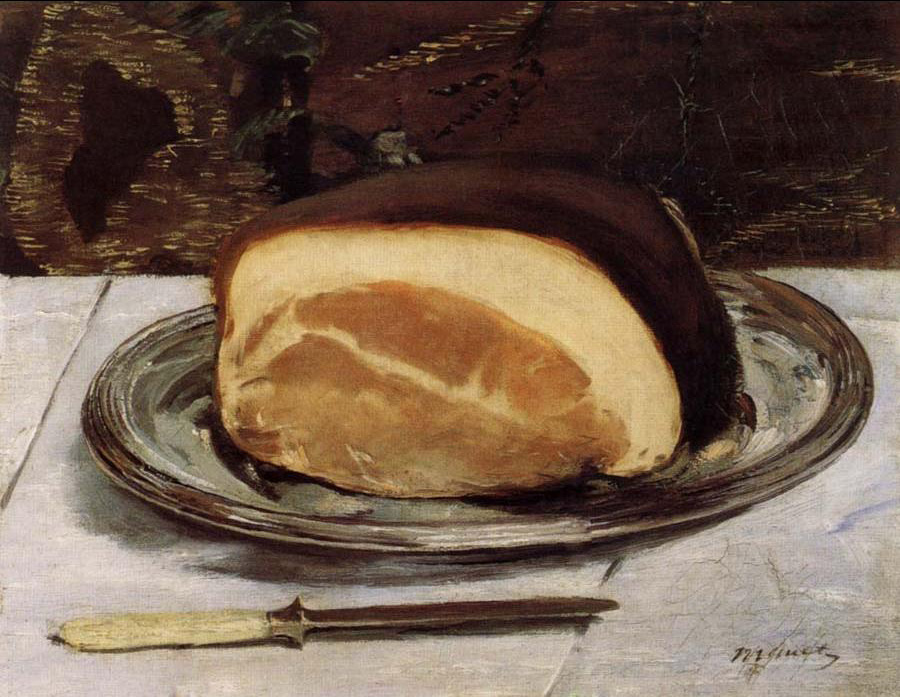
Édouard Manet, The Ham, ca. 1875–1880.

The painting is also part of Manet's late still-life series, which includes works like The Lemon and The Ham. These still lifes reflect his interest in reductionist techniques, where objects are isolated to explore their formal qualities and the broader implications of representation. According to Armstrong, they emphasize the closure of the subject and its transformation into purely visual consumption.

== Cultural significance ==
The story behind A Sprig of Asparagus has become a well-known anecdote in art history, often cited as an example of Manet's ability to blend humor with artistic expression. The painting is celebrated for its playful commentary on the value of art and its role in social and economic exchanges. By humorously equating a painted asparagus with its real counterpart, Manet challenged traditional notions of value, representation, and the commodification of art.

The painting's influence has extended beyond the art world. It is referenced in Sheila Heti's novels How Should A Person Be? and Pure Color, where the author cites it as her favorite painting. In How Should A Person Be?, Heti's narrator says: "It was the most moving thing I had ever seen, painted so tenderly and with such a loose hand that it hardly seemed like it had been any work at all."

== See also ==
- List of paintings by Édouard Manet
- 1880 in art

== Bibliography ==
- (in French) Denis Rouart and Sandra Orienti, Tout l’œuvre peint d'Édouard Manet, Paris, Flammarion, coll. « Les Classiques de l'Art », 1997 (1re éd. 1970), 126 p. (ISBN 978-2080102386)
- (in French) Olivier Céna, « Manet, inventeur du moderne », Télérama, no 3196, 16 avril 2011 (lire en ligne [archive])
- (in French) James H. Rubin (translated by Jeanne Bouniort), Manet : Initiale M, l’œil, une main, Paris, Flammarion, 2011, 416 p. (ISBN 9782081256736)
