= Meldola =

- Comune
- Comune di Meldola
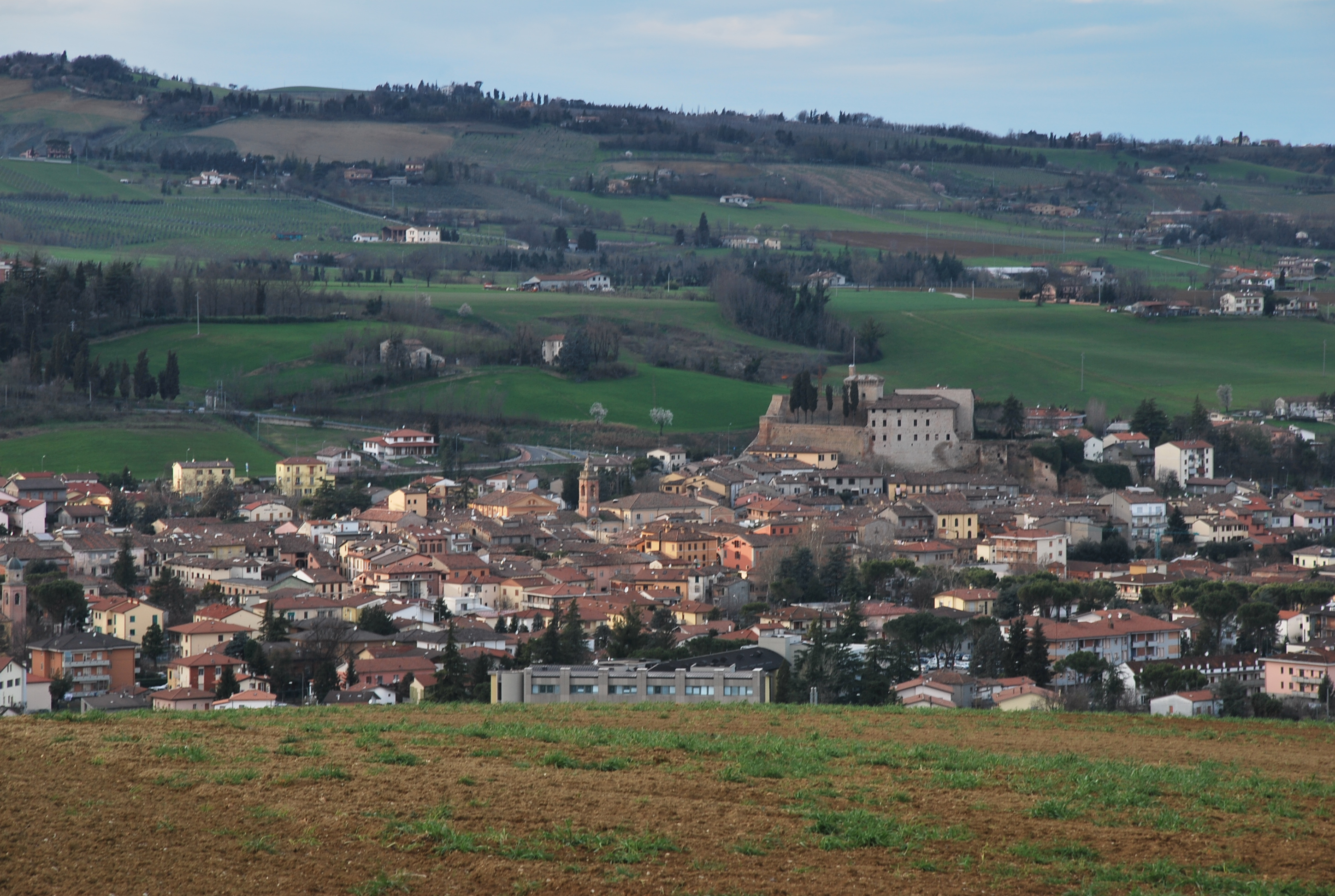
- View of Meldola

- Coat of arms

- Location within Italy Location within Emilia-Romagna
- Coordinates: 44°08′N 12°03′E
- Country: Italy
- Region: Emilia-Romagna
- Province: Forlì-Cesena (FC)
- Frazioni: San Colombano, Ricò-Gualdo, Teodorano, Piandispino-Valdinoce, Vitignano

Government
  - Mayor: Roberto Cavallucci

Area
  - Total: 78 km^{2} (30 sq mi)
- Elevation: 58 m (190 ft)

Population (1 January 2009)
  - Total: 10,142
  - Density: 130/km^{2} (340/sq mi)
- Demonym: Meldolesi
- Time zone: UTC+1 (CET)
  - Summer (DST): UTC+2 (CEST)
- Postal code: 47014
- Dialing code: 0543
- Patron saint: St. Nicholas, Beata Vergine del Popolo
- Saint day: December 6
- Website: Official website

Meldola (Romagnol: Mèdla) is a town and comune near Forlì, in Emilia-Romagna, Italy.

== History ==
The area of Meldola has been inhabited since very ancient times. The Romans built here a large aqueduct (still existing under the ground) which served the military port of Classis. To the 5th-6th century belongs a large patrician villa which is now under the historical centre.

In the Middle Ages, a castle was present, the name Meldola was first attested around the year 1000. The castle was a possession of the Montefeltro, Ordelaffi, Malatesta, the Borghese Aldobrandini and the Doria Pamphilj. It gained the status of city in 1862, soon after the unification of Italy.

== Main sights ==
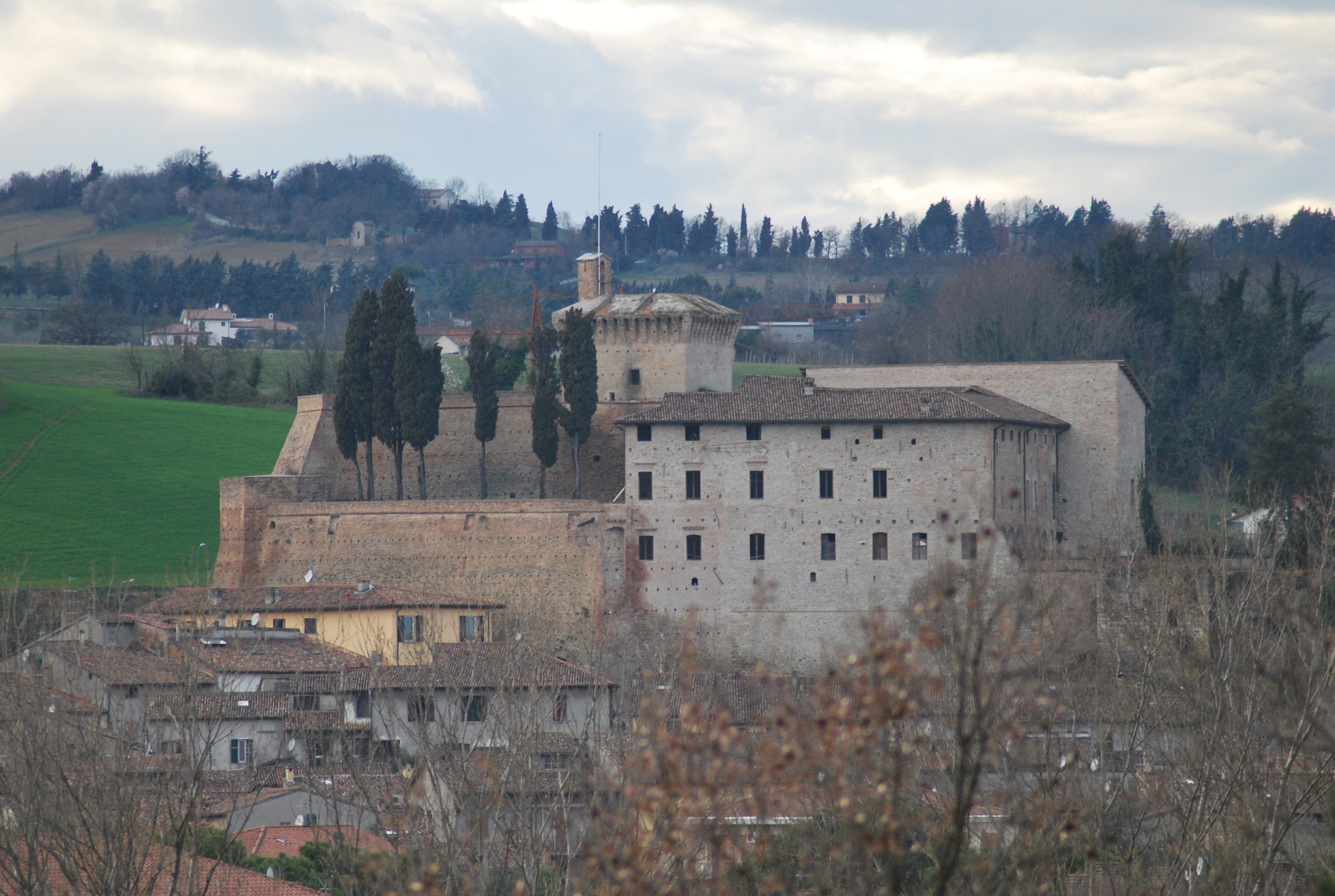
Rocca in Mendola

- Rocca (castle)
- Castle of Teodorano, outside the city. Of the originary fortified burgh, destroyed by Cesare Borgia, a tower and part of the walls remain.
- Church of the Madonna del Sasso (1523). It is now home to the Ecology Museum.
- Churches of San Cosimo and San Nicolò.
- Ponte dei Veneziani (Venetians' Bridge), a 5-arch bridge dating from the early 16th-century.
- Scardavilla Wood preserved area
- Rocca delle Caminate fortress, which was a summer residence of Benito Mussolini

== Government ==
=== List of mayors ===
Mayor	Term start	Term end	Party
Corrado Ghetti	1993	2004	Democrats of the Left
Loris Venturi	2004	2009	Democrats of the Left/Democratic Party
Gian Luca Zattini	2009	2019	Lega Nord
Roberto Cavallucci	2019	Incumbent	Independent (centre-left)

== Economy ==
In the late 19th century and in the first years of 20th century, Meldola was well known for its production of silk. The main activities include agriculture and the manufacture of furniture. A recently built oncology hospital provides research into cancer and care for cancer patients.

== Notable people ==
The following notable persons were born in Meldola: the philosopher and theologian Bartholomew Mastrius; the patriot Felice Orsini; the painter Maria Giuditta Versari. Football coach Alberto Zaccheroni was also born in Meldola.

- Annarita Balzani, Italian sprinter
- Enrico Lombardi, painter and writer
- Fabio Lombardi, ethnomusicologist and organologist
- Luigi Michelacci, painter
- Gian Luca Zattini, politician
