= Giuseppe Baldini (painter) =

Italian painter

Giuseppe Baldini (5 January 1807 – 8 April 1876) was an Italian painter, specializing in portraits, landscapes, and religious subjects, born in Livorno where he worked most of his life.

== Biography ==
He studied at the Accademia di San Luca in Rome. Among his pupils were a young Giovanni Fattori and Giovanni Costa. Among his works are portraits of Capitan Lavarello and S. Pediani, Signora Baluganti; and his Figlio Eugenio. For the church of San Giuseppe, Livorno, he painted Jesus gives the keys to St Peter; Martyrdom of Sts Crispin and Crispiniano; and Jesus at Prayer in the Orchard.
