= A Bundle of Asparagus =

1880 painting by Manet

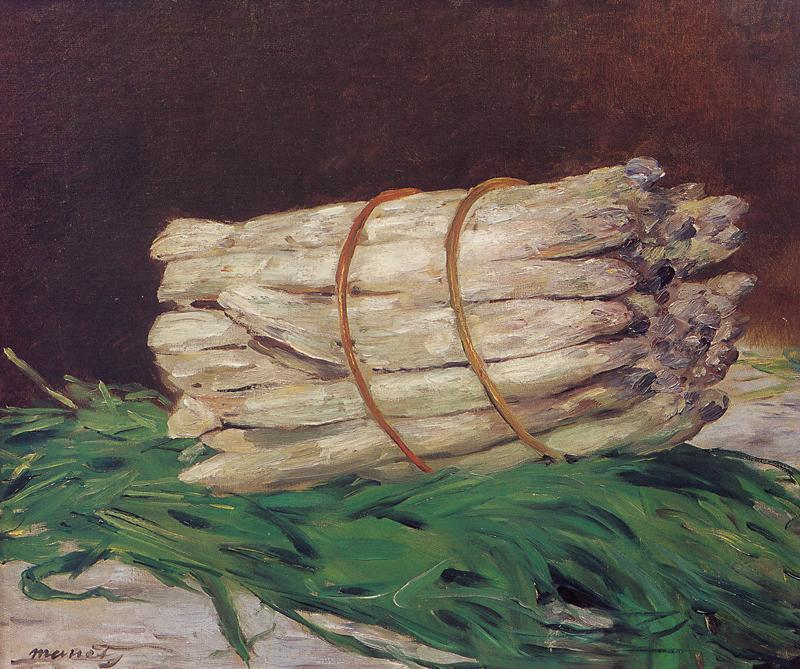
- Artist: Édouard Manet
- Year: 1880
- Medium: oil on canvas
- Dimensions: 46 cm × 55 cm (18 in × 22 in)
- Location: Wallraf–Richartz Museum , Cologne, Germany

A Bundle of Asparagus or A Bunch of Asparagus (Une botte d'asperges, La botte d'asperges or Botte d'asperges) is an 1880 painting by Édouard Manet.

It was commissioned by the art collector Charles Ephrussi for 800 francs. On receiving the work he gave the artist 1,000 francs instead and so Manet decided to paint a smaller second work, now known as A Sprig of Asparagus. He sent this second work to Ephrussi with a note reading, "There was one [sprig] missing in your bundle".

== Image description ==
Manet's Bunch of Asparagus shows a motif based on traditional still life painting. In the center of the picture lies a bunch of white asparagus stalks in the bright light. The view goes from the side to the bunch of asparagus, whose violet tips are aligned to the right edge of the picture. It is held together by two thin willow rods that were used to transport the vegetables. The bunch of asparagus lies on a base of green leaves that reach from the left side to the lower right corner of the picture. Manet's biographer Théodore Duret speaks of a lit d'herbes vertes (bed of green leaves). For the art historian Mikael Wivel, Manet presented the asparagus in the same way a greengrocer would display his goods. A bluish-white background can be seen at the bottom left and in the middle of the right edge of the picture, which could be a tablecloth or a light marble slab. The signature 'Manet' can be found on the lower left of this light background. The upper half of the picture is occupied by a black-brown background in which "the colors are velvety intertwined", as the author Gotthard Jedlicka states.

In this composition, the green leaves and purple asparagus tips have the difficult task of contrastingly separating the asparagus spears from the background, both of which are executed in a similar color scheme. Gotthard Jedlicka sees a connection to the colors of the background in the dark willow branches. For him, there is also a first impression in which the asparagus spears appear yellow and the tips appear purple. On closer inspection, however, they are "painted with an indescribable richness of color tones". Jedlicka sees other color nuances in the yellow of the asparagus spears, such as blue, white, rosy and violet tones, and in the tips he recognizes red, blue, green, yellow and other colors, with each tip being painted individually. For Jedlicka, Manet's brushwork ranges from "broad and impasto application to the finest drawing in lines and dots". The museum director Gert von der Osten emphasizes that Manet's still life was "painted quite openly impressionist with ingenious accuracy".

Manet's style of painting in this picture was examined in detail by employees of the Wallraf-Richartz-Museum & Fondation Corboud in Cologne in 2008 on the occasion of the exhibition Impressionism: How the light came to the canvas. When viewing the work in transmitted light, in which the painting is illuminated from behind, it could be proven that Manet applied the brown color of the background thinly to the gray primed canvas in an "old masterly" manner. He worked with a flat brush and left out the area of the asparagus spears. When looking at the painting with the help of a microscope, the painting style in the area of the asparagus was also analyzed. Here Manet worked with a narrow brush and placed the lines next to each other and crossed them. In contrast to traditional painting, he did not carefully mix the colors on the palette, but only directly on the canvas. The impression of the fleeting style of painting is further reinforced by the sometimes impasto application of the paint. The "colors painted wet on wet" indicate that Manet probably created the painting in "a single working session".

== See also ==
- List of paintings by Édouard Manet
