= Quadrato di Villafranca =

Painting by Giovanni Fattori

The Quadrato di Villafranca
- Esercitazione di Tiro (Italian)
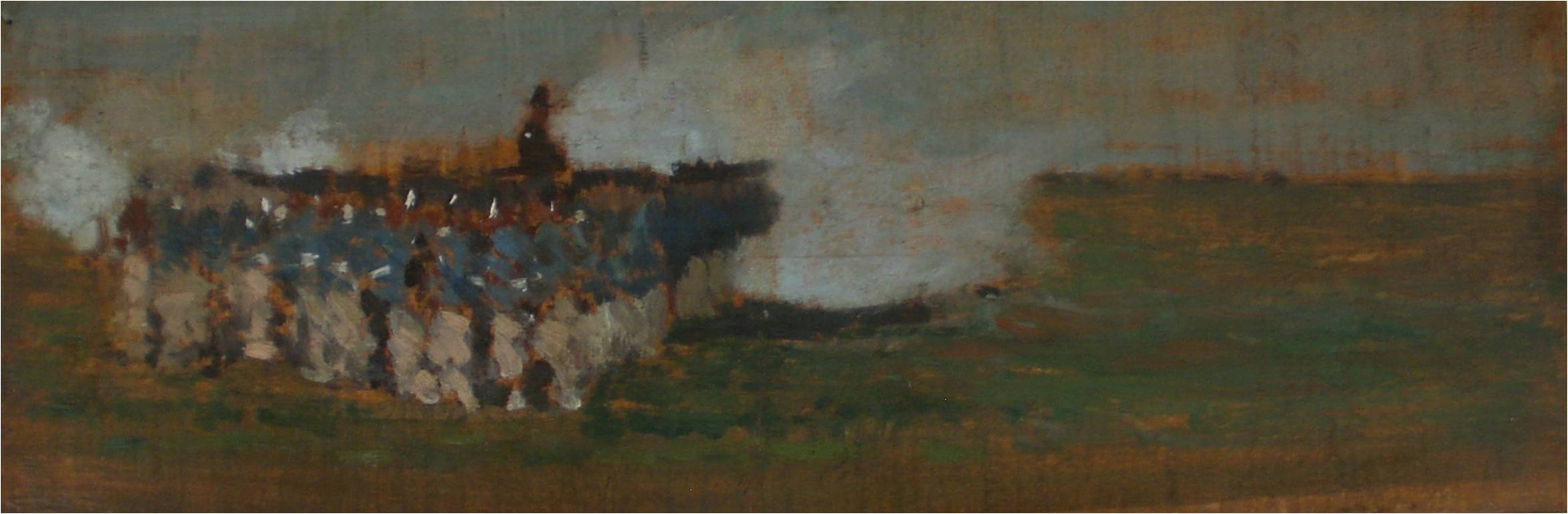
- Artist: Giovanni Fattori
- Year: ca. 1876–1880
- Medium: Oil on canvas
- Dimensions: 11 cm × 32 cm (4.3 in × 12.5 in)
- Location: Private collection

Il Quadrato di Villafranca or Esercitazione di tiro is an oil painting on canvas created approximately between 1876 and 1880 by the Italian artist Giovanni Fattori depicting a scene of the Battle of Custoza of 1866.

The painting belonged to the Stramezzi collection of Crema and is published in the catalogue of Giovanni Malesci (Ed. De Agostini, Novara) al n° 175 with the title Esercitazione di Tiro. The painting has been exhibited at the Macchiaioli exhibition organized by the Board of the Gallery of Modern Art of Florence in 1956, at the Montecatini Terme exhibition in 1986 and at the Mole Antonelliana in Turin in 1986.
