= Giovanni Fattori =

Italian painter

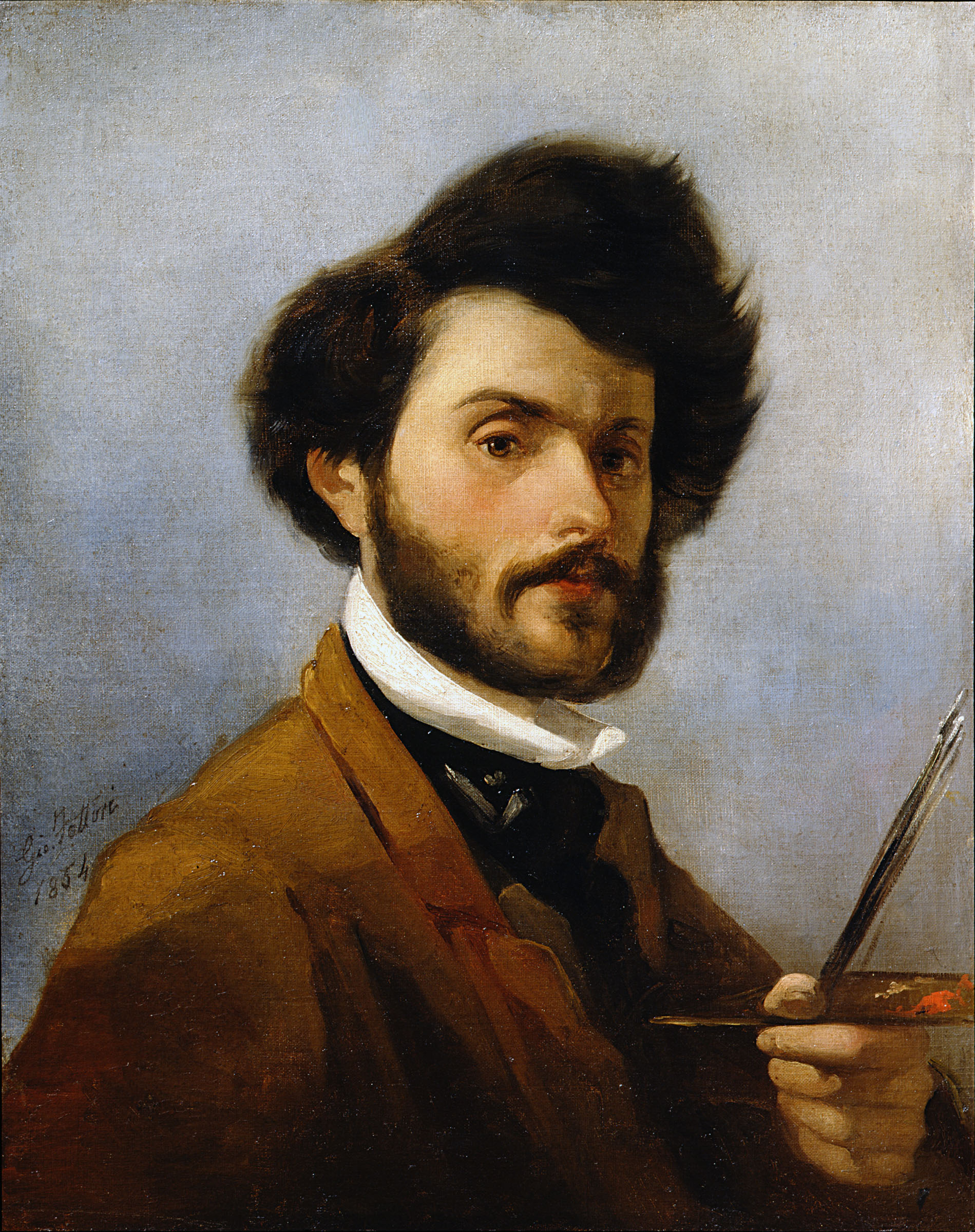
- Self-Portrait (1854), oil on canvas, 59 x 46.5 cm, Florence, Galleria d'Arte Moderna
- Born: 6 September 1825; Livorno, Grand Duchy of Tuscany
- Died: 30 August 1908 (aged 82); Florence, Kingdom of Italy
- Known for: Painting
- Movement: Macchiaioli

Giovanni Fattori (6 September 1825 – 30 August 1908) was an Italian artist, one of the leaders of the group known as the Macchiaioli. He was initially a painter of historical themes and military subjects. In his middle years, inspired by the Barbizon school, he became one of the leading Italian plein-airists, painting landscapes, rural scenes, and scenes of military life. After 1884, he devoted much energy to etching.

== Biography ==
=== Youth and training ===
Fattori was born in modest circumstances in Livorno. His early education was rudimentary, and his family initially planned for him to study for a qualification in commerce, but his skill in drawing persuaded them to apprentice him in 1845 to Giuseppe Baldini (1807–1876), a local painter of religious themes and genre subjects. The following year, he moved to Florence, where he first studied under Giuseppe Bezzuoli and, later in the year, at the Academy of Fine Arts in Florence. At that time, however, his energies were directed less toward the study of art than to reading the historical novels (especially those with medieval themes) of such authors as Ugo Foscolo, Francesco Domenico Guerrazzi and Walter Scott.

In 1848, he interrupted his studies and participated as a courier, distributing leaflets for the Partito d'Azione, in the democratic anti-Austrian movement during the revolutionary years of 1848–49. However, his family prevented him from joining the army. In 1850, he resumed his studies at the Accademia in Florence. He made it a habit to note all his observations in small notebooks that he always kept with him, illustrating with innumerable sketches. Some of his later etchings were based on these observations.

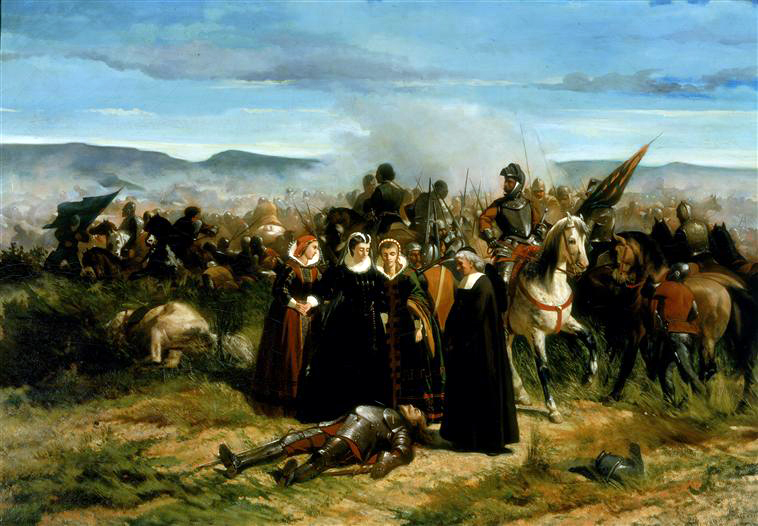
Mary Stuart at the Camp of Crookstone, 1859–61, oil on canvas, 76 x 108 cm, Palazzo Pitti, Florence

=== Early paintings (to 1860) ===
Fattori's development to maturity as a painter was unusually slow. His first paintings, a few of which survive, date from the early 1850s. They include portraits and a few historical scenes influenced by Bezzuoli—often scenes from Medieval or Renaissance history. In 1851, he participated in the Promotrice fiorentina with the painting Ildegonda, inspired by the short novel by Tommaso Grossi. In 1853–54, he studied realism, together with the Turin artist Andrea Gastaldi (1826–1889). He probably painted his first landscapes in Gastaldi's company. Around 1857 Enrico Pollastrini, another pupil of Bezzuoli, introduced him to the style of Ingres. This had some impact on Fattori's historical paintings. One of his best historical themes was "Maria Stuarda" (Mary Stuart at the battlefield of Langside), painted between 1858 and 1860, based on his reading of Walter Scott.

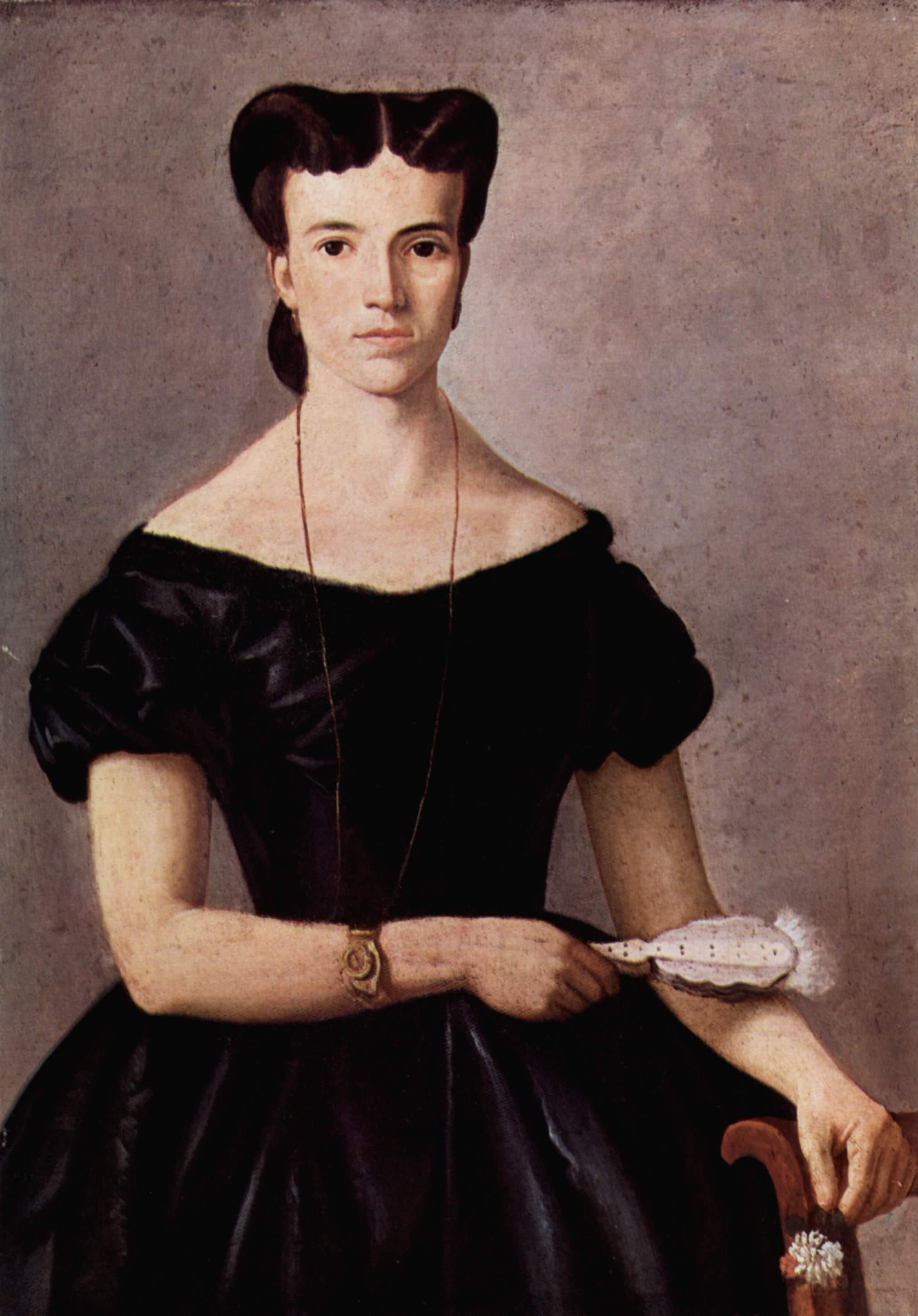
Lady with a Fan, 1865–66, oil on canvas, 90 x 63 cm

In the early 1850s, Fattori began frequenting the Caffè Michelangiolo on via Larga, a popular gathering place for Florentine artists who carried on lively discussions of politics and new trends in art. Several of these artists would discover the work of the painters of the Barbizon school while visiting Paris for the Exposition of 1855, and would bring back to Italy an enthusiasm for the then-novel practice of painting outdoors, directly from nature. In 1859, Fattori met Roman landscape painter Giovanni Costa, whose example influenced him to join his colleagues and take up painting realistic landscapes and scenes of contemporary life en plein air. This marked a turning point in Fattori's development: he became a member of the Macchiaioli, a group of Tuscan painters whose methods and aims are somewhat similar to those of the Impressionists, of which they are considered forerunners. Like their French counterparts, they were criticised for their paintings' lack of decorative qualities and conventional finish, although the Macchiaioli did not go as far as the Impressionists did in dissolving form in light.

In 1859, he won the competition for a patriotic battle scene, organised by the Concorso Ricasoli (national competition organised by the government of Bettino Ricasoli) with his painting Il campo italiano dopo la battaglia di Magenta (The Italian Camp at the Battle of Magenta) (completed in 1860–61). The financial reward allowed him to marry Settimia Vannucci in July 1859 and to settle in Florence.

=== Paintings in the middle period (1861–1883) ===
Fattori's mature works represent a synthesis between the natural light of painting en plein air—painting with vivid but composed spots (macchia)—and the traditional method of composing large paintings in the studio, from sketches.

During the period 1861–67, he stayed mainly at Livorno to nurse his wife, who had contracted tuberculosis. During this period, he painted peasantry, themes from rural life and also some portraits, such as La cugina Argia. In these works, he demonstrated his mastery of macchia technique, natural light and shade with their contrasting areas of broad colour, showing the formative influence of Giovanni Costa.

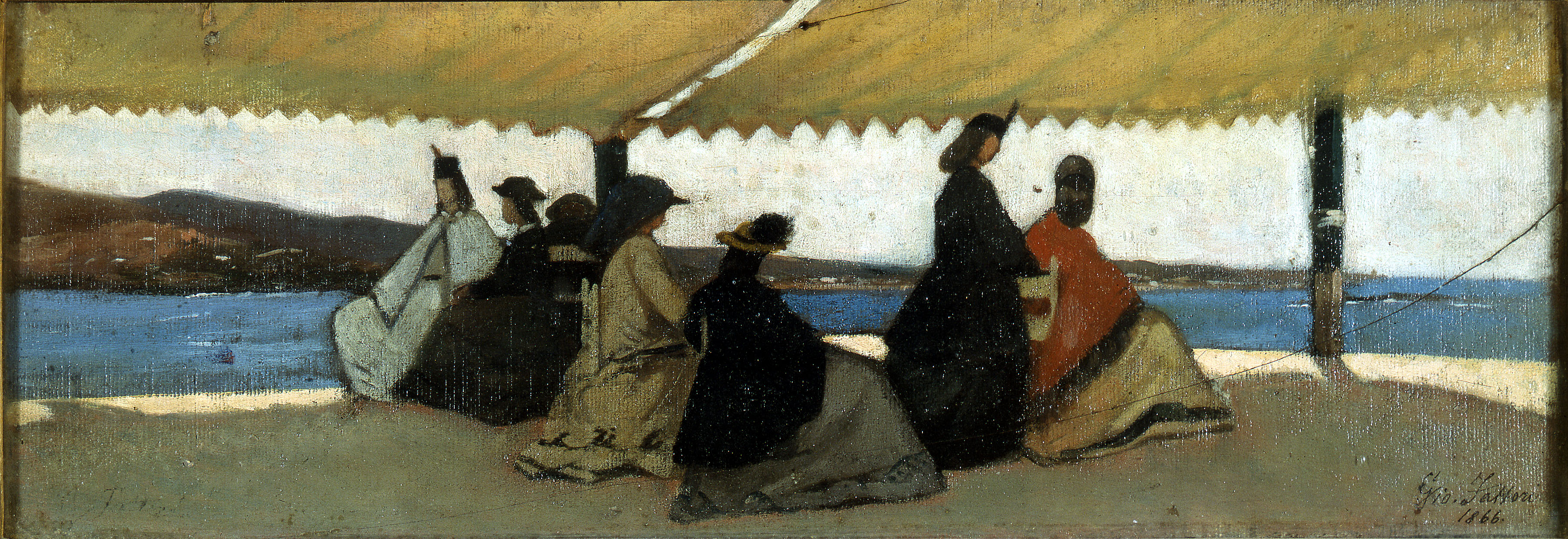
La Rotonda di Palmieri, 1866, oil on wood, 12 x 35 cm, Florence, Galleria d'Arte Moderna

In 1864, he submitted four more works to the Promotrice fiorentina. In his landscape painting La Rotonda di Palmieri (Palmieri's round terrace) (1866), geometrical simplicity and colour have become a structural part of the painting.

Late in 1866, he moved to a new and larger studio in Florence to accommodate his larger historical canvases, as he still received commissions for epic battle scenes from the Italian unification (Risorgimento). A famous painting from this period is the Storming of the Madonna della Scoperta, an episode of the Battle of San Martino (1859).

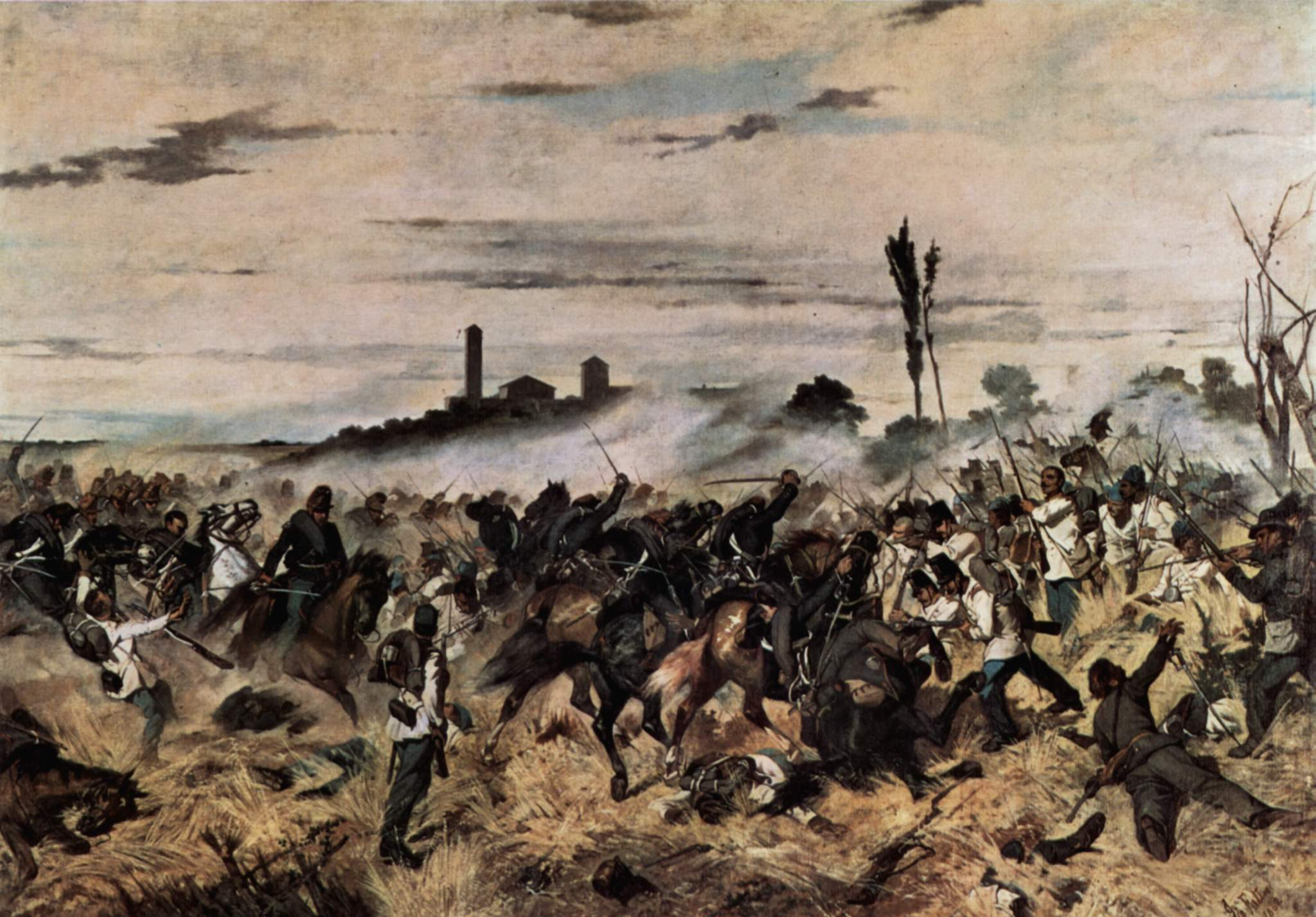
Storming of the Madonna della Scoperta, 1862, oil on canvas, 204 x 290 cm, Livorno, Museo Civico Fattori

Following the death of his wife in March 1867, he spent the summer of 1867 in Castiglioncello with the critic Diego Martelli, the theoretician of the Macchiaioli. Working together with the painter Giuseppe Abbati on the same themes, he painted a number of landscapes en plein air and studies of rustic life and peasants working in market gardens. In these paintings, he put particular emphasis on a bold design within geometrical simplicity, and on an intense luminosity. One of his paintings from this period is Pause in the Maremma with Farmers and Ox-cart (1873–75).

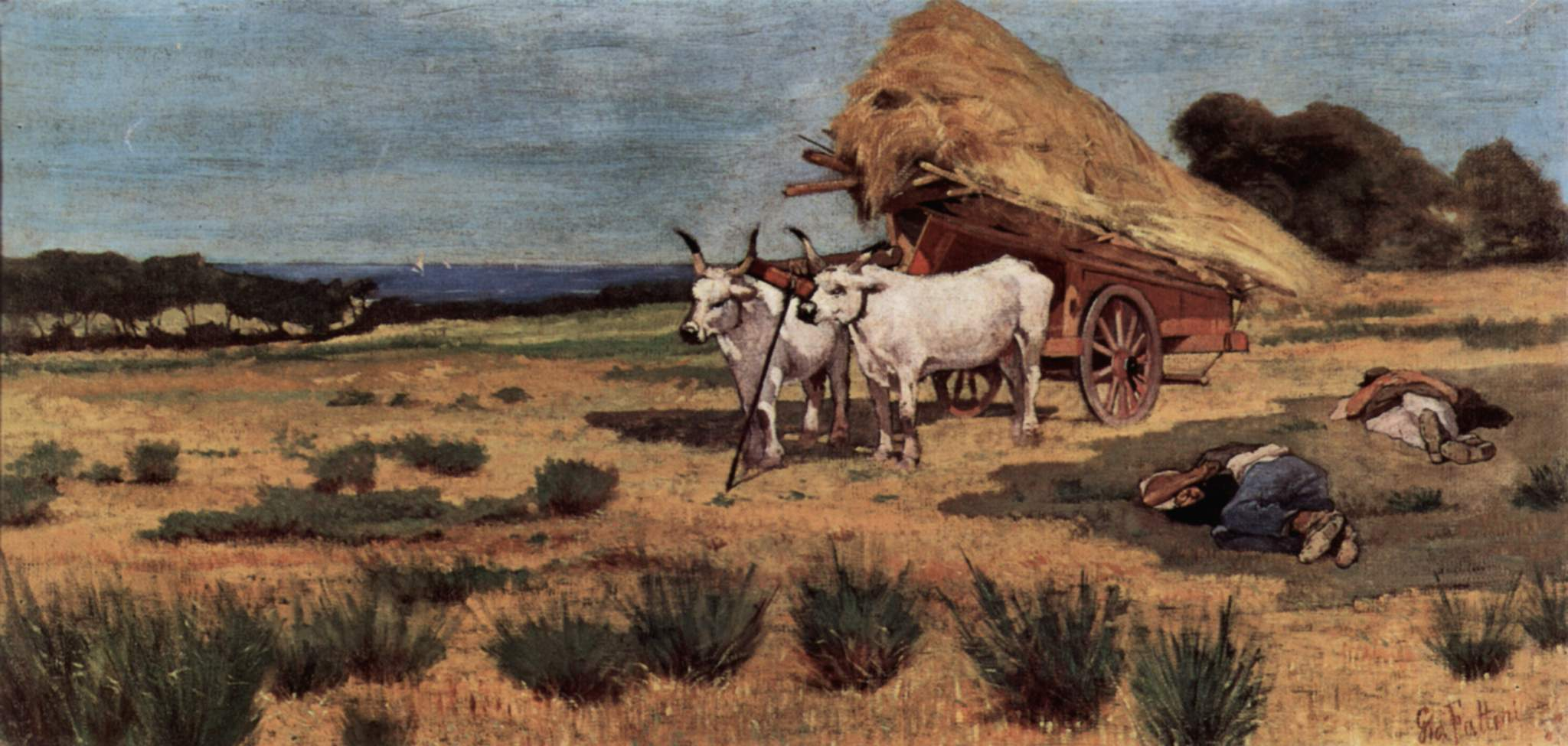
Pause in the Maremma with farmers and ox-cart, 1873–75

Fattori received an award at the Parma exhibition of 1870 for his battle scene Prince Amadeo Feritio at Custoza. On a trip to Rome in 1872, he made studies for Horse Market at Terracina (painting destroyed) for which he received a bronze medal at the World Exhibition of Vienna in 1873 and again at the Philadelphia World's Fair in 1876. The trip also provided material for Roman Carts (1872–1873).

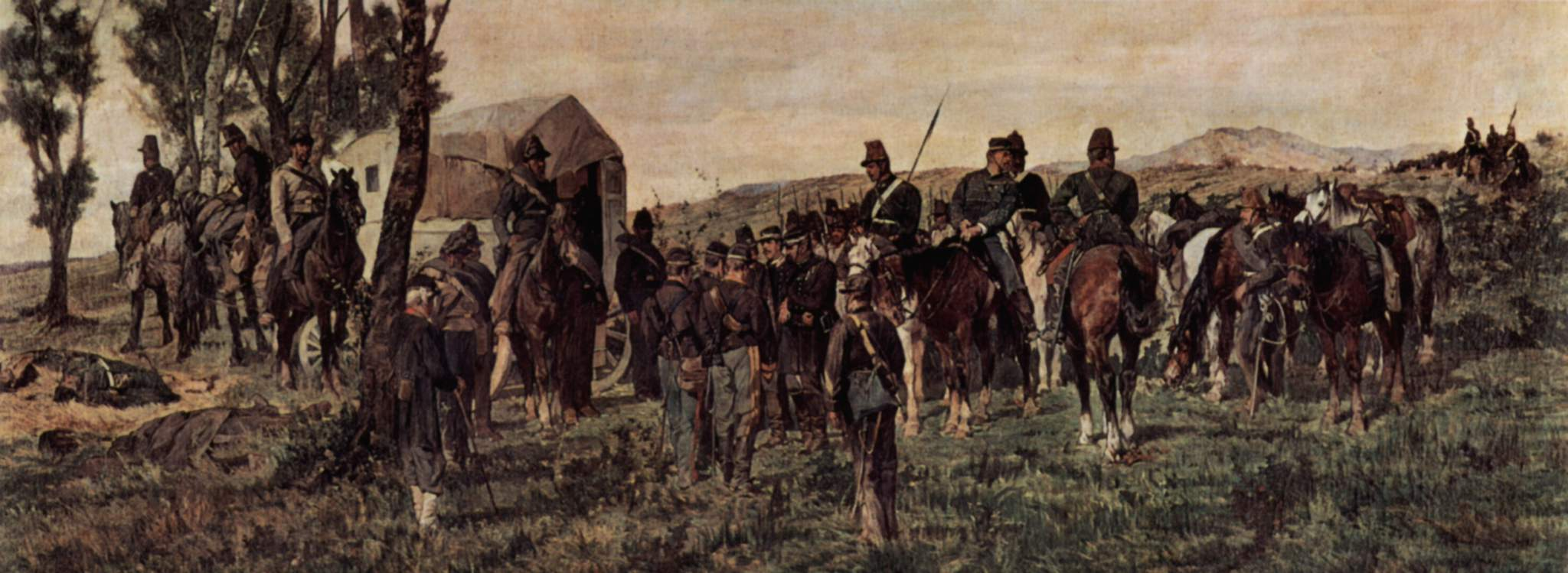
Prince Amadeo Feritio at Custoza, 1870

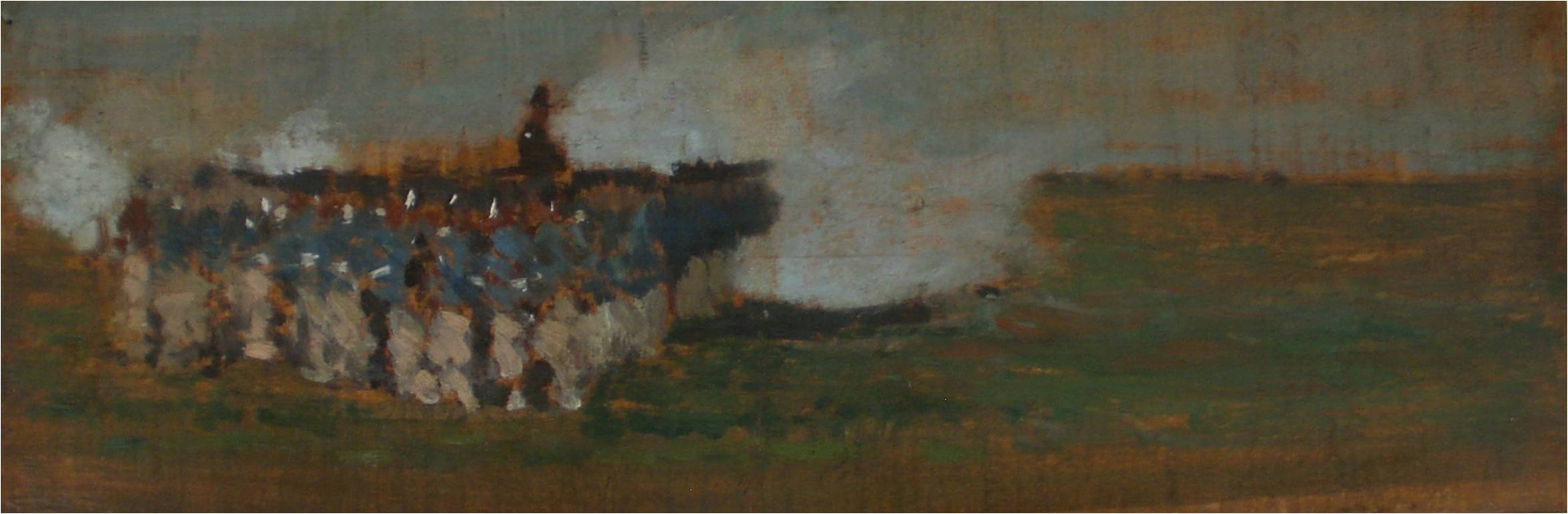
Quadrato di Villafranca or Esercitazione di Tiro, 1876–80

In 1875, Fattori, together with Francesco Gioli, Egisto Ferroni and Niccolò Cannicci, visited Paris, where he was exhibiting his work Repose at the Salon. Via Diego Martelli, who was now living in Paris, he came into contact with many French artists, among them Camille Pissarro and the expatriate Federico Zandomeneghi. But he reacted unenthusiastically to Impressionist works, expressing his preference for the artists of the Barbizon school and his deep admiration for Édouard Manet and Corot.

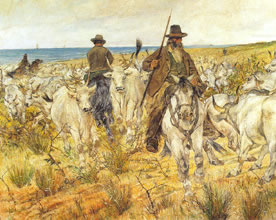
Cowboys of the Maremma Driving the Herds, 1893, oil on canvas, 200 x 300 cm, Livorno, Museo Civico Fattori

He started giving private painting lessons and, from 1869, he taught twice weekly at the Florentine Academy. Among these students was the young Amedeo Modigliani, who enrolled at the Florentine Academy around 1902. Though Modigliani would soon move toward a radically different aesthetic, his early training under Fattori grounded him in the Macchiaioli tradition of direct observation and tonal discipline, a foundation visible in his early figurative work before his departure for Paris in 1906. However, he experienced financial difficulties, as his battle scenes found few purchasers. When he was unable to pay his taxes, his property in Florence was confiscated; this and a broken kneecap further depressed him. In 1878, he sent two paintings to the Exposition Universelle of Paris, but was too impoverished to attend. His disillusionment is revealed in the harsher realism of his works from the late 1870s.

In the 1880s, he painted mainly rural themes, such as horses and cattle. His visits to the estate of the Princes Corsini in Maremma in 1881 and 1882 culminated in a series of paintings of cowherds, some of which were exhibited at the Esposizione Nazionale in Venice in 1887.

=== Later paintings and etchings (1884–1908) ===
From 1875 on, he began producing many graphics and, from 1884, a significant number of etchings. These met approval at the exhibition Promotrice in Florence (1886) and at the Esposizione Nazionale in Bologna (1888). In the same year, these last etchings were acquired by the Galleria Nazionale d'Arte Moderna in Rome. His etchings were innovative in their technique and composition.

In 1884, he produced an album with 20 original lithographs: 20 Ricordi del vero. In 1888, he was promoted to Resident Professor of Drawing in the Accademia of Florence and was also named Professor of Figure Study at the School of Architecture.

His painted sketches made outdoors are typically painted on small wood panels. These were used as reference material in painting larger compositions of rural subjects, such as his Branding of the Colts in the Maremma (1887) or Cowboys and Herds in the Maremma (1893). These large-scale canvases provide a visual drama and a spaciousness, lacking in most contemporary traditional formats.

Fattori participated in the exhibitions at Cologne (award, 1889), Bologna, Milan (Accademia di Brera, 1891), Turin (Accademia Albertina, 1900) and Florence. He was also present with one painting, the Brush Gatherers, at the Italian Exhibition in London. At exhibitions in Paris, he received an honourable mention in 1889 and the gold medal at the Exposition Universelle in 1900 for his etching 'Bovi al Carro' (Oxen to the Cart).

In 1891, Giovanni Fattori married for the second time, this time with his companion Marianna Bigozzi Martinelli. Despite the modest income his work provided, he lived in poverty. Financial trouble and rising debt forced him again to give private tuition. Lack of money to buy frames prevented him from participating in the exhibition in Dresden in 1896.

He also started drawing illustrations, first for I promessi sposi, a historical novel by Manzoni (1895) and in 1896, illustrations for the satirical newspaper Fiammetta (founded by his friend Diego Martelli).

In 1900, he became a member of the Accademia Albertina of Turin. After the death of his second wife in 1903, Fattori married again in 1906, this time to Fanny Marinelli.

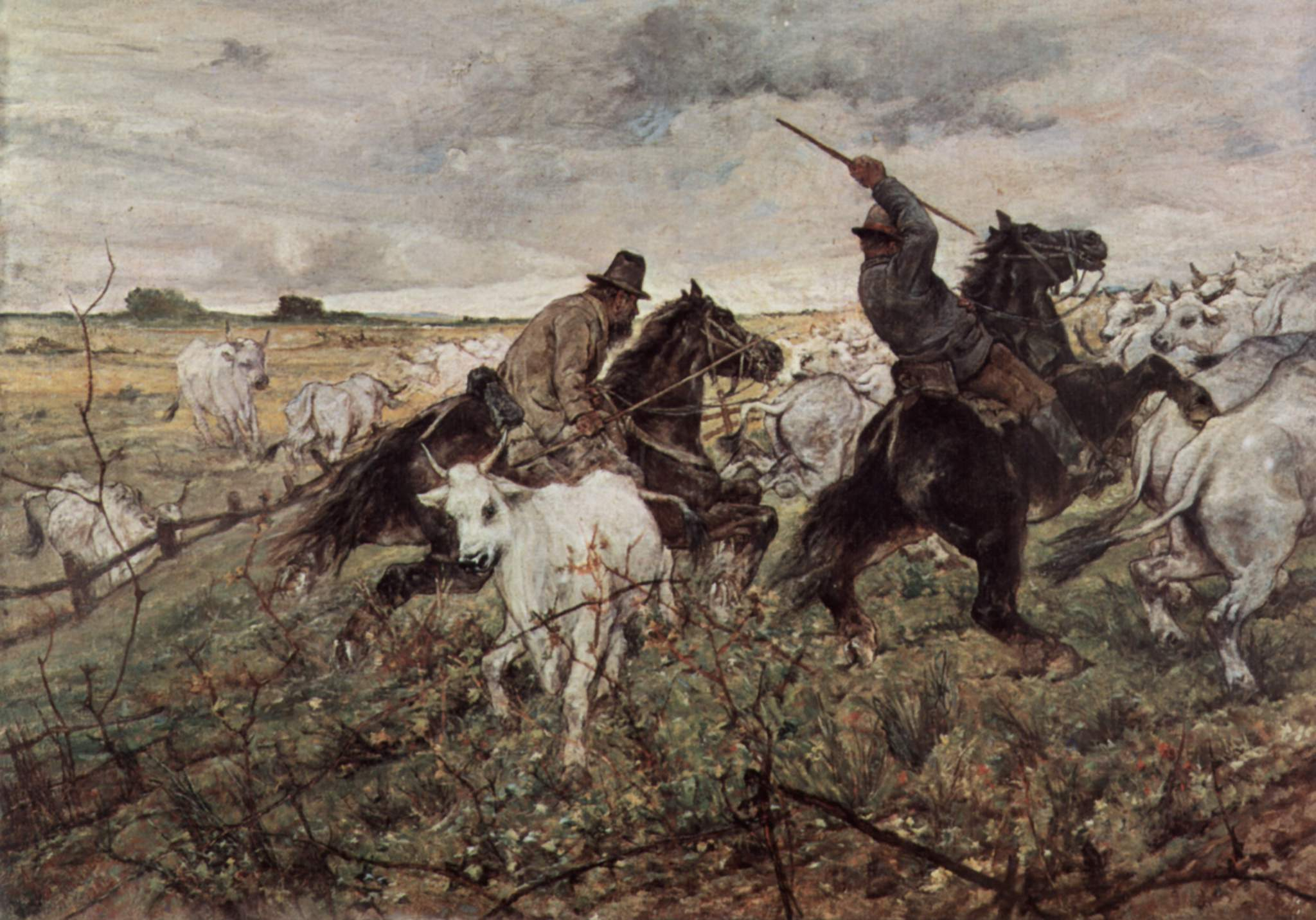
Cowboys and Herds in the Maremma, 1893, oil on canvas, 105 x 150 cm

His old age was marked by a bitter disillusionment with the social and political order that had emerged in post-unification Italy. He continued teaching at the Accademia, but preferred clinging to tradition instead of adopting new ideas. Known for his honesty and candour, Fattori deplored the direction he saw some of his students were taking in the 1890s, as a group of them, led by his favourite pupil Plinio Nomellini, adopted a Neo-impressionist style, the Divisionismo (Chromoluminarism). In 1891 he engaged in a polemic against pointillism.

Around 1903, he wrote: "Do you know which is the worst animal? Man. Why? Egotistical, false, and a betrayer ... I believe in nothing: I hold nothing sacred but my wife and my stepdaughter. I am an atheist because I do not believe that there must be a God upon whom good and evil depend ... I have spent my years hoping and I will end discouraged." Among his late works are several images expressive of his profound disappointment, notably The Dead Horse—What Now?

He died in Florence on 30 August 1908. He was buried, with other illustrious people from Livorno, in the loggia next to the church Santuario della Madonna di Montenero in the village of Monte Nero.

== Legacy ==
Giovanni Fattori is considered the most prominent member of the Macchiaioli. His work is dominated by military subjects, which are rarely battle scenes but rather soldiers in encampments, soldiers mustering, or infantry units at rest. He also painted sensitive portraits, landscapes, rural scenes and horses. But at the end of his life, he was out of touch with the new currents in painting, which led to his decline. His works didn't attract the interest of the public anymore, causing his financial troubles. Giovanni Fattori was respected by his colleagues, but due to his aloofness, he didn't get the recognition of the public at large.

Examples of his work are at Galleria Nazionale d'Arte Moderna in Rome; Pinacoteca metropolitana di Bari; Galleria Civica d'Arte Moderna e Contemporanea, in Turin, Pinacoteca di Brera, Milan, Galleria d'Arte Moderna in Palazzo Pitti; and in New Zealand, the Dunedin Public Art Gallery; in North America at Boston's Museum of Fine Arts. Among his pupils were Luigi Michelacci and Ruggero Panerai.

He is honoured in his home town by the Museo Civico Giovanni Fattori in Livorno.

== See also ==
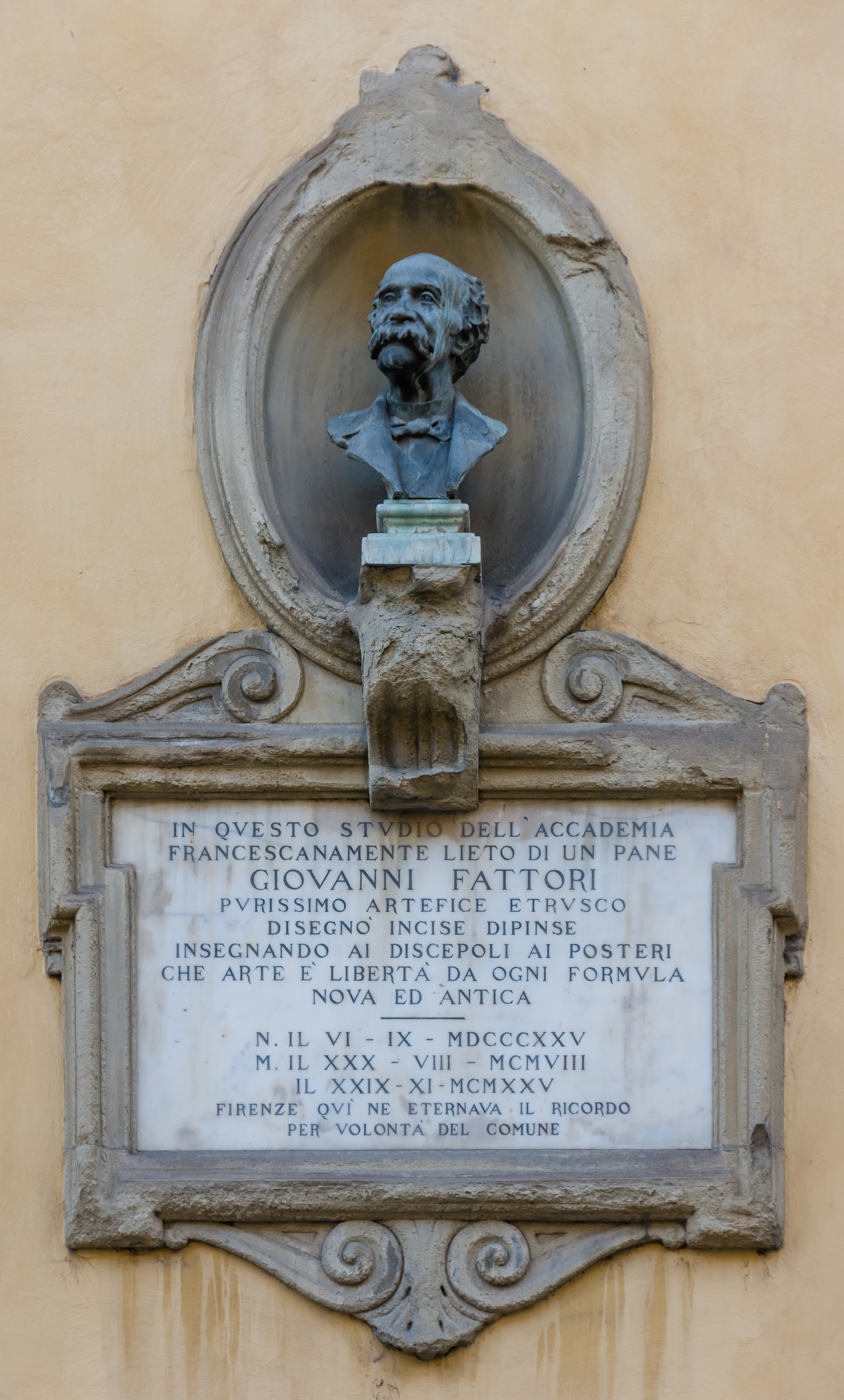
Monument to the Livornese painter Giovanni Fattori on the wall of the Accademia di Belle Arti di Firenze (Academy of Fine Arts of Florence), in Via Battisti. The bust is the work of the sculptor Fosco Tricca.

- Macchiaioli
- Landscape art

== Sources ==
- Broude, Norma (1987). The Macchiaioli: Italian Painters of the Nineteenth Century. New Haven and London: Yale University Press. ISBN 0-300-03547-0
- Steingräber, E., & Matteucci, G. (1984). The Macchiaioli: Tuscan Painters of the Sunlight : 14 March - 20 April 1984. New York: Stair Sainty Matthiesen in association with Matthiesen, London. OCLC 70337478
- Fattori, Giovanni, & Baboni, Andrea (2003). Giovanni Fattori: il sentimento della figura; Catalogue of an exhibition held at Villa La Versiliana, Marina di Pietrasanta, 5 July - 31 August 2003.
- Fattori, G., Polis, A., & Museo di Palazzo vecchio (Florence, Italy). (2002). Giovanni Fattori Acqueforti: Un segno dei tempi : imprintings. Firenze: Art'eventi. OCLC 500390746
- Benezit, E. (1976). Dictionnaire des Peintres, Sculpteurs, Dessinateurs et Graveurs. Librairie Gründ, Paris. ISBN 2-7000-0156-7 (in French)
- Turner, J. (1996). Grove Dictionary of Art. Oxford University Press. ISBN 0-19-517068-7
