= Pacific Highlands Ranch, San Diego =

- Community of San Diego
- Pacific Highlands Ranch
- Playground at The Village in Pacific Highlands Ranch.

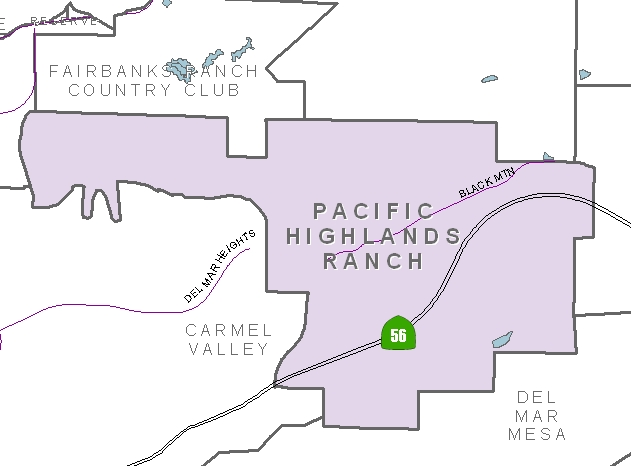
- Pacific Highlands Ranch and surrounding communities

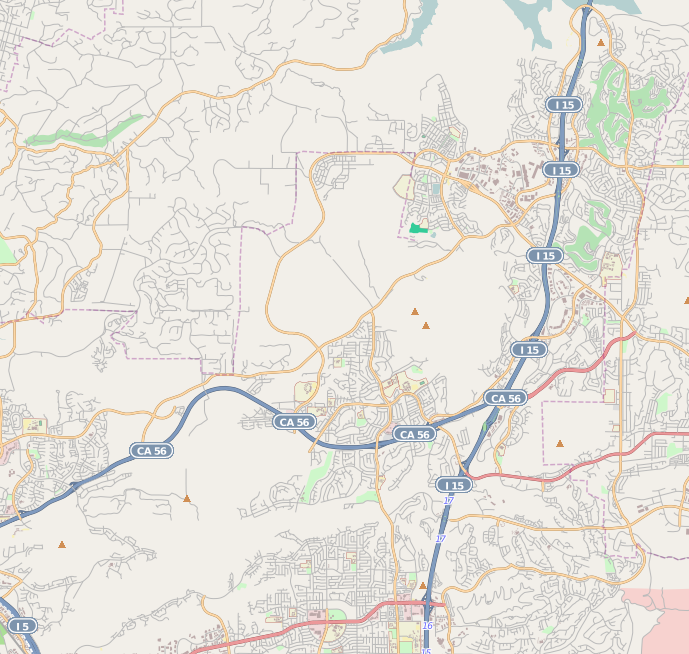
- Location within Northeastern San Diego Location within San Diego County, California
- Coordinates: 32°57′54.24″N 117°11′31.41″W
- Country: United States of America
- State: California
- County: San Diego
- City: San Diego

Pacific Highlands Ranch (often referred to as and considered a part of Carmel Valley, a community to its west) is a primarily residential community of approximately 2,652 acres (1,073 ha) in northern San Diego, California. As part of San Diego City Council District 1, it is represented by Joe LaCava, elected in 2020, and as part of District 3 of the San Diego County Board of Supervisors, it is represented by Terra Lawson-Remer, also elected in 2020. Both had not been elected to those positions before.

== History ==
=== Rancho Del Sol ===
The City of San Diego annexed the land in 1964 to build low-density housing in the area, which was previously known then as Rancho Del Sol.

Rancho Del Sol was largely used for agriculture prior to suburbanization, as it was largely made up of tomato and strawberry farms, as well as plant nurseries.

=== Rancho de los Diablos ===
The land was also home to an self-governing, informal migrant farm camp that was known as "Rancho de los Diablos", which housed up to 2,000 residents of the settlement when it first formed in the early 1970's, who worked in the farms and lived off of the land to survive. The encampment was home to a local elected town council, church services, medical clinic, general store, communal bathhouse, brothel, and many sports fields for soccer, basketball, and volleyball. San Diego PD noted that it was a vibrant crystal Methamphetamine hub that was subject to many daily patrols. The settlement was demolished in the summer of 1994 at the request by nearby communities.

The community later moved east to Torrey Highlands after becoming displaced to make way for the Pacific Highlands Ranch development.

=== Pacific Highlands Ranch ===
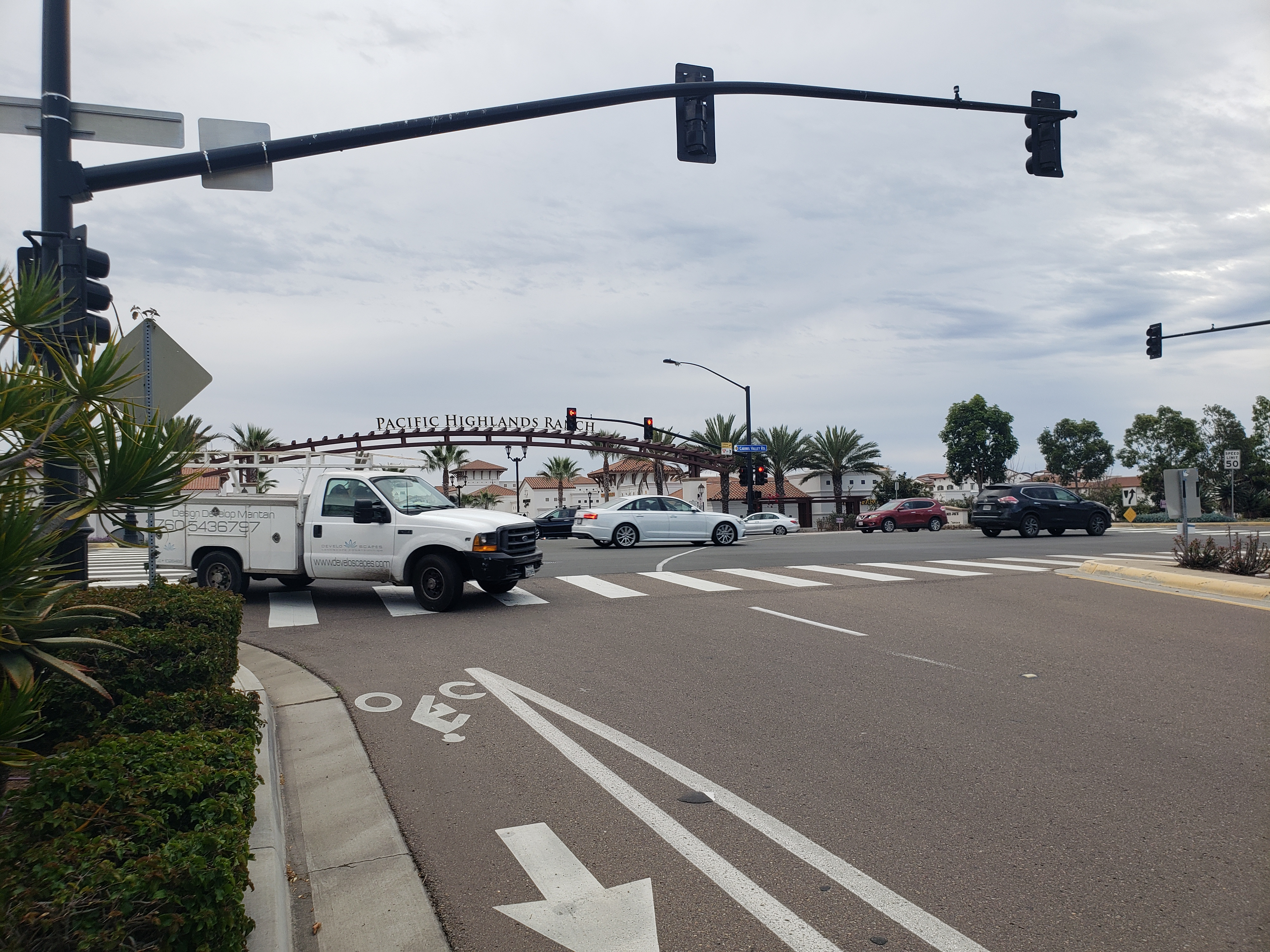
Intersection of Carmel Valley Road and Pacific Highlands Ranch Parkway.

The residential development of Pacific Highlands Ranch was approved by the City of San Diego in 1998, in which the majority of the community was developed by Pardee Homes in the 2000s.

== Geography ==
The community is bordered to the north by Fairbanks Ranch and Rancho Santa Fe, to the south by Del Mar Mesa, to the east by Torrey Highlands, and to the west by Carmel Valley. State Route 56 (Ted Williams Freeway) passes through this community.

1,300 acres (49 percent) of this community is preserved as natural habitat.

== Demographics ==
According to January 2010 estimates by the San Diego Association of Governments (SANDAG), there were 4,224 people and 1,655 households residing in the neighborhood. The estimated racial makeup was 68.5% White, 17.4% Asian & Pacific Islander, 11.7% Hispanic, 1.6% from other races, 0.4% African American, and 0.2% American Indian. The median age was 40.9 with 22.7% under the age of 18 and 13.2% over the age of 65. The estimated median household income was $269,757 (current dollars); 47% of the community made more than $200,000; 52% made between $60,000 and $199,999; and 1% made less than $60,000.

However, the January 1, 2019 SANDAG estimates indicated a total population of 10,422 made up of 3,211 households. The estimated racial & ethnic makeup was 43.1% White, 37.2% Asian, 0.5% Pacific Islander, 10.4% Hispanic, 5% 2 Or More, 2.5% Black, 1% American Indian, and 0.4% Other. The median age was 32.5 with 23.7% under the age of 18 and 11.9% over the age of 65. The estimated median household income was $163,136 in 2010 dollars ($194,434 in the then-current 2018 dollars); in 2010 dollars, 38% of households made $200,000 or more; 47% made between $60,000 and $199,999; and 16% made less than $60,000.

== Education ==
Public schools in this community include Sycamore Ridge Elementary School (Del Mar Union School District), Solana Ranch Elementary School (Solana Beach School District), and Pacific Trails Middle School and Canyon Crest Academy (San Dieguito Union High School District). There are also a number of residents who attend public school outside of Pacific Highlands Ranch, most notably Torrey Pines High School in Carmel Valley (San Dieguito Union High School District). The only private school in this community is Cathedral Catholic High School (Roman Catholic); however, San Diego Jewish Academy, located in Carmel Valley, is within close proximity of the western border of Pacific Highlands Ranch.
