= List of primary and secondary schools in San Diego =

This is a list of primary and secondary schools in San Diego, California, organized by school district.

San Diego Unified School District is the school district that serves the majority of San Diego. The district includes 121 elementary schools, 24 middle schools, 21 high schools, and 2 atypical schools. In the northern part of the city, Poway Unified School District and San Dieguito Union High School District are outside city limits, but serve several schools within city limits. In the southern part of the city, Sweetwater Union High School District serves multiple schools within city limits, although it is headquartered outside city limits.

== High schools ==
=== Charter ===
School	Neighborhood	Focus
Cortez Hill Academy	Cortez Hill (Downtown)	Liberal arts
E3 Civic High School	East Village	Biomedical health and digital media
Gary and Jerri-Ann Jacobs High Tech High Charter School	Liberty Station	Liberal arts
Gompers Preparatory Academy	Chollas View	College preparatory
Health Science High & Middle College	Corridor	Medicine
High Tech High charter schools	Point Loma	Liberal arts
The O'Farrell Charter schools	South Encanto and Skyline	College preparatory
Preuss School at UCSD	University City and La Jolla	College preparatory

=== Private denominational ===
School	Neighborhood	Religion
The Academy of Our Lady of Peace	University Heights	Roman Catholic
The Bishop's School	Village of La Jolla	Episcopal
Cathedral Catholic High School	Carmel Valley	Roman Catholic
Christian High School	City of El Cajon	Christian
Horizon Christian Academy	Clairemont Mesa West	Christian
Mater Dei High School	Otay Ranch	Roman Catholic
St. Augustine High School	North Park	Roman Catholic
St. Gregory the Great	Sycamore Estates	Roman Catholic
Santa Fe Christian	Solana Beach	Christian
Torah High Schools of San Diego	University City	Jewish
Victory Christian Academy	Oak Park	Lutheran

=== Private nonsectarian ===
School	Neighborhood
Army and Navy Academy	City of Carlsbad
Balboa City School	Bankers Hill
Excelsior Academy	City of La Mesa
Francis W. Parker School	Linda Vista
Futures Academy	Kensington
Grauer School	Encinitas
La Jolla Country Day School	University City
La Petite Ecole du Lycee Francais	Serra Mesa
Pacific Ridge School	Carlsbad

=== Poway Unified ===
School	Neighborhood
Abraxas High School	Poway
Del Norte High School	4S Ranch and Black Mountain Ranch
Mount Carmel High School	Rancho Peñasquitos
Poway High School	Poway
Rancho Bernardo High School	Rancho Bernardo
Westview High School	Torrey Highlands

=== San Diego Unified ===
School	Neighborhood
Canyon Hills High School	Tierrasanta
Clairemont High School	Bay Park and Clairemont Mesa West
East Village High School	East Village
Herbert Hoover High School	City Heights
James Madison High School	Clairemont Mesa East
Kearny High School	Linda Vista
La Jolla High School	Beach Barber Tract
Lincoln High School	Lincoln Park
Mira Mesa High School	Mira Mesa
Mission Bay High School	Pacific Beach
Patrick Henry High School	San Carlos
Point Loma High School	Loma Portal
Samuel F. B. Morse High School	Skyline and Bay Terraces
San Diego High School	East Village and Cortez Hill
San Diego School of Creative and Performing Arts	Bay Terraces
Scripps Ranch High School	Scripps Ranch
University City High School	University City
Will C. Crawford High School	El Cerrito

=== San Dieguito Union ===
School	Neighborhood
Canyon Crest Academy	Carmel Valley
La Costa Canyon High School	Carlsbad
San Dieguito Academy	Encinitas
Sunset High School	Encinitas
Torrey Pines High School	Carmel Valley

== Middle/junior high schools ==
=== Private nonsectarian ===
School	Neighborhood
Grauer School	Encinitas
The Child's Primary School	Clairemont Mesa West

=== Poway Unified ===
School	Neighborhood
Bernardo Heights Middle School	Rancho Bernardo
Black Mountain Middle School	Rancho Peñasquitos
Mesa Verde Middle School	Rancho Peñasquitos
Oak Valley Middle School	4S Ranch
Meadowbrook Middle School	Poway
Twin Peaks Middle School	Poway

=== San Diego Unified ===
School	Neighborhood
Bell Middle School	Bay Terraces
Challenger Middle School	Mira Mesa
Clark Middle School	Fairmount Village
Correia Middle School	Point Loma Heights
Dana Middle School	Roseville Fleet Ridge
De Portola Middle School	Tierrasanta
Keiller Leadership Academy	Jamacha-Lomita
Creative Performing Media Arts	North Clairemont
Lewis Middle School	Allied Gardens
Magnolia Science Academy - San Diego	Allied Gardens
Mann Middle School	El Cerrito
Marshall Middle Schoo	Scripps Ranch
Marston Middle School	Bay Park
Montgomery Middle School	Linda Vista
Muirlands Middle School	Muirlands
The O'Farrell Charter Middle School	South Encanto and Skyline
Pacific Beach Middle School	Pacific Beach
Pershing	Lake Murray
Roosevelt Middle School	Marston Hills
Standley Middle School	University City
Taft Middle School	Serra Mesa
Wangenheim Middle School	Mira Mesa
Wilson Middle School	Corridor

=== San Dieguito Union ===
School	Neighborhood
Carmel Valley Middle School	Carmel Valley
Diegueno Middle School	Encinitas
Earl Warren Middle School	Solana Beach
Oak Crest Middle School	Encinitas
Pacific Trails Middle School	Carmel Valley

== Elementary schools ==
=== Private independent ===
School	Neighborhood	Religion
The Child's Primary School	Clairemont Mesa West	Private, independent
Del Mar Pines School	Carmel Valley	None
Murphy Canyon Preschool	Kearny Mesa	None
Lifetime Montessori School	Santaluz, San Diego	Private, Independent, Montessori

=== Private classical ===
School	Neighborhood	Religion
The Cambridge School	Rancho Peñasquitos	Christian, classical

=== Private denominational ===
School	Neighborhood	Religion
The Cambridge School	Rancho Peñasquitos	Christian, Classical
Christian Unified of San Diego	El Cajon	Christian
Horizon Christian Academy	Clairemont Mesa West	Christian
Islamic School of San Diego	Clairemont Mesa East	Islam
Ramona Lutheran School	Ramona	Christian, Lutheran
Reformation Lutheran Church and School	Clairemont Mesa East	Christian, Lutheran (WELS)
St. Michael's School	Poway	Catholic
St. Paul's Lutheran School	Pacific Beach	Lutheran
St. Rita's School	Valencia Park	Catholic

=== Cardiff School District ===
School	Neighborhood
Ada Harris Elementary School (grades 3-6)	Encinitas
Cardiff Elementary School (grades K-2)	Encinitas

=== Encinitas Union ===
School	Neighborhood
Capri Elementary School	Leucadia
El Camino Creek Elementary School	Carlsbad
Flora Vista Elementary School	Encinitas
La Costa Heights Elementary School	Carlsbad
Mission Estancia Elementary School	Carlsbad
Ocean Knoll Elementary School	Encinitas
Olivenhain Pioneer Elementary School	Carlsbad
Park Dale Lane Elementary School	Encinitas
Paul Ecke Elementary School	Encinitas

=== Poway Unified ===
School	Neighborhood
Adobe Bluffs Elementary School	Rancho Peñasquitos
Canyon View Elementary School	Rancho Peñasquitos
Chaparral Elementary School	Poway
Creekside Elementary School	Sabre Springs
Deer Canyon Elementary School	Rancho Peñasquitos
Del Sur Elementary School	Black Mountain Ranch
Garden Road Elementary School	Poway
Highland Ranch Elementary School	Carmel Mountain Ranch
Los Peñasquitos Elementary School	Rancho Peñasquitos
Midland Elementary School	Old Poway
Monterey Ridge Elementary School	4S Ranch
Morning Creek Elementary School	Sabre Springs
Painted Rock Elementary School	Poway
Park Village Elementary School	Rancho Peñasquitos
Pomerado Elementary School	Poway
Rolling Hills Elementary School	Black Mountain Ranch
Shoal Creek Elementary School	Carmel Mountain Ranch
Stone Ranch Elementary School	4S Ranch
Sundance Elementary School	Rancho Peñasquitos
Sunset Hills Elementary School	Rancho Peñasquitos
Tierra Bonita Elementary School	Poway
Turtleback Elementary School	Rancho Bernardo
Valley Elementary School	Poway
Westwood Elementary School	Rancho Bernardo
Willow Grove Elementary School	Black Mountain Ranch Village

=== San Diego Unified ===
School	Neighborhood
Alice Birney Elementary School	University Heights
Balboa Elementary School	Shelltown
Barnard Asian Pacific Language Academy	Pacific Beach
Boone Elementary School	Bay Terraces
Central Elementary School	Teralta West
Cherokee Point Elementary School	Cherokee Point
Clairemont Canyons Academy	Clairemont Mesa East
Dingeman Elementary School	Miramar Ranch North
Edison Elementary School	Corridor
Ellen Browning (E.B.) Scripps Elementary School	Miramar Ranch North
Hage Elementary School	Mira Mesa
Hamilton Elementary School	City Heights
Hancock Elementary School	Allied Gardens
Innovations Academy	Kearny Mesa
Jerabek Elementary School	Scripps Ranch
John Adams Elementary School	Normal Heights
John G. Marvin Elementary School	Allied Gardens
John Paul Jones Elementary School	Serra Mesa
Johnson Elementary School	Emerald Hills
Joyner Elementary School	City Heights
Kumeyaay Elementary School	Tierrasanta
Linda Vista Elementary School	Linda Vista
Logan Memorial Educational Campus	Logan Heights and Memorial
McKinley Elementary School	North Park
Miller Elementary School	Tierrasanta
Miramar Ranch Elementary School	Scripps Ranch
Mt. Everest Academy	Clairemont Mesa West
Pacific Beach Elementary School	Pacific Beach
Rosa Parks Elementary School	Fairmount Village
Sandburg Elementary School	Mira Mesa
Sequoia Elementary School	Clairemont Mesa East
Spreckels Elementary School	University City
Tierrasanta Elementary School	Tierrasanta
Vista Grande Elementary School	Tierrasanta
Washington Elementary School	Little Italy

== Preschool through high school ==
=== Private denominational ===
School	Neighborhood	Religion
The Bishop's School	Village of La Jolla	Episcopalian
Horizon Christian Academy	Clairemont Mesa West	Christian
Little Lamb Land Christian Preschool	Mount Hope	Christian
Midway Baptist Schools	San Diego	Baptist
San Diego Academy	National City	Christian
San Diego Jewish Academy	Carmel Valley	Jewish
The Cambridge School	Rancho Peñasquitos	Christian

=== Private nonsectarian ===
School	Neighborhood
Au Clair de Lune	Linda Vista
Day-McKellar Preparatory School	La Mesa
Francis W. Parker (lower school)	Mission Hills
Francis W. Parker (upper school)	Linda Vista
Fusion Academy and Learning Center	Solana Beach
La Jolla Country Day School	La Jolla and University City
Leeway Sudbury School	Normal Heights
Ocean View Hills School	Ocean View Hills
San Diego French American School (K-8)	La Jolla Alta
Waldorf School of San Diego	City Heights

== Other schools ==
- Art of Problem Solving Online School offers math and computer science courses online at the middle school and high school level. This school offers courses directly to students and their families as well as through arrangements with other schools.
- Monarch School, a preschool-through-12 school exclusively for children impacted by homelessness, run as a public-private partnership between the Monarch School Project and the San Diego County Office of Education

== See also ==
- List of high schools in San Diego County, California
- List of school districts in San Diego County, California
