= List of school districts in San Diego County, California =

List of school districts in San Diego County, California

== Primary and secondary ==
- Alpine Union School District
- Bonsall Unified School District
- Borrego Springs Unified School District
- Cajon Valley Union School District
- Cardiff School District
- Carlsbad Unified School District
- Chula Vista Elementary School District
- Coronado Unified School District
- Dehesa School District
- Del Mar Union School District
- Encinitas Union School District
- Escondido Union School District
- Escondido Union High School District
- Fallbrook Union Elementary School District
- Fallbrook Union High School District
- Grossmont Union High School District
- Jamul-Dulzura Union School District
- Julian Union School District
- Julian Union High School District
- La Mesa-Spring Valley School District
- Lakeside Union School District
- Lemon Grove School District
- Mountain Empire Unified School District
- National School District
- Oceanside Unified School District
- Poway Unified School District
- Ramona Unified School District
- Rancho Santa Fe Elementary School District
- San Diego Unified School District
- San Dieguito Union High School District
- San Marcos Unified School District
- San Pasqual Union School District
- San Ysidro School District
- Santee School District
- Solana Beach School District
- South Bay Union School District
- Spencer Valley School District
- Sweetwater Union High School District
- Vallecitos School District
- Valley Center-Pauma Unified School District
- Vista Unified School District
- Warner Unified School District

== Post-secondary ==
- Grossmont-Cuyamaca Community College District
- Miracosta Community College District
- Palomar Community College District
- San Diego Community College District
- Southwestern Community College District

== See also ==
- Primary and secondary schools in San Diego, California
- List of high schools in San Diego County, California
- List of school districts in California by county
