= Del Mar Union School District =

School district in California, United States

Address
- 11232 El Camino Real San Diego, California, 92130; United States

District information
- Type: Public
- Grades: K–6
- Established: 1906
- Superintendent: Marisa Janicek
- NCES District ID: 0610740

Students and staff
- Students: 3,853 (2020–2021)
- Teachers: 202.22 (FTE)
- Staff: 229.65 (FTE)
- Student–teacher ratio: 19.05:1

Other information
- Website: www.dmusd.org

Del Mar Union School District (DMUSD) is a public school district based in Del Mar in San Diego County, California. The district was founded in 1906. In the 1970s, the district was small, with only two schools- Del Mar Hills (1974) and Del Mar Heights (1965), both west of the 5 Freeway. However, in the 1990s, the district's boundaries were expanded to include the newly developed Carmel Valley subdivision and Torrey Hills area in the City of San Diego. Carmel Del Mar School opened in 1992, followed by seven more new schools, all east of the 5 freeway. Today, approximately 3,600 children attend the district's nine schools. Enrollment has been declining for years.

As of 2025, the Superintendent is Marisa Janicek. Holly McClurg was previously Superintendent for 16 years. The two previous Superintendents Sharon McClain and Tom Bishop were fired in 2010 and 2008, and both of their contracts were bought out. McClain filed suit for "unlawful termination" and was awarded over $400,000 in damages.

The district also was involved in a lawsuit over the design of the re-build of a new Del Mar Heights campus that went on for several years, costing taxpayers millions of dollars in legal fees, re-design costs, and increases in materials and labor. The new school finally opened in 2024. Del Mar Hills Academy (0.7 miles away) was remodeled in 2024-2025.

== Academics ==
The district is well regarded for its high standardized test scores. In 2006, the district scored 939 on the Academic Performance Index, higher than any other district in San Diego County. This top-ranking was repeated in 2007. Individually, Sage Canyon School posted the highest Base APIs scores in the County from 2004 to 2008.

== Schools ==
The district consists of nine K-6 schools:

- Ashley Falls School
- Carmel Del Mar School
- Del Mar Heights School
- Del Mar Hills Academy
- Ocean Air School
- Pacific Sky School
- Sage Canyon School
- Sycamore Ridge School
- Torrey Hills School

Together with the schools in the Solana Beach School District, the Del Mar Union elementary schools generally feed into Carmel Valley Middle School, Pacific Trails Middle School, or Earl Warren Middle School and onto either Torrey Pines High School or Canyon Crest Academy, all part of the San Dieguito Union High School District.
