= Eben Dobson III =

American businessman

- Born: San Diego
- Occupations: American entrepreneur and businessman

Eben Dobson III is an American entrepreneur and businessman who is the founder of WISP Technologies. The company is best known for its appearance on the US television show Shark Tank.

== Personal life ==
Dobson lives in Solana Beach, but was born in San Diego.

== WISP ==
Dobson had founded WISP nearly six years prior to its appearance on Shark Tank, having thought of the idea after hurting his back bending over to consistently sweep his floor. He had got the name WISP by being able to hit a golf ball to its target from over 300 yards while being slight in stature.
