= University of San Diego (disambiguation) =

The University of San Diego is a private Roman Catholic research university in San Diego, California.

University of San Diego may also refer to the following in San Diego:

- University of California, San Diego, public research university in the UC school system
- San Diego State University, public research university in the California State University system
- University of San Diego High School, defunct Catholic high school that operated from 1957 to 2005

== See also ==
- Education in San Diego
