= San Dieguito Union High School District =

School district in California, United States

Address
- 710 Encinitas Boulevard Encinitas, California, 92024; United States

District information
- Type: Public
- Motto: Engaged, Inspired, Prepared
- Grades: 7–12
- Established: 1936; 90 years ago
- Superintendent: Anne Staffieri
- School board: Rimga Viskanta; Jodie Williams; Jane Lea Smith; Michael Allman; Phan Anderson
- Schools: 10
- NCES District ID: 0634380
- District ID: 3768346

Students and staff
- Students: 13,001 (2020–2021)
- Teachers: 515.28 (FTE)
- Staff: 938.8 (FTE)
- Student–teacher ratio: 25.23:1

Other information
- Website: www.sduhsd.net

San Dieguito Union High School District (SDUHSD) is a public school district based in northern San Diego County, California. Established in 1936, the district serves over 13,000 students in five middle schools, five comprehensive high schools, and one alternative high school.

== History ==
Prior to 1936, students who lived in coastal North County attended high school in Oceanside. In January 1936, the communities of Encinitas, Cardiff, Solana Beach, Del Mar, Green Valley, and Olivenhain voted in favor to form a new high school district. San Dieguito Union High School, now San Dieguito High School Academy was the flagship school of the district, in which the first classes were held in September 1936. Architect Lillian J. Rice was hired by the district board to design the school.

The district now serves students from five elementary school districts in North County: the Encinitas, Rancho Santa Fe, Cardiff, Solana Beach, and Del Mar School Districts. Students from those school districts matriculate through the middle schools and high schools.

== Boundary ==
The district includes Encinitas, Del Mar, Solana Beach, portions of Carlsbad and San Diego, the Fairbanks Ranch and Rancho Santa Fe census-designated places, and most of the Elfin Forest CDP.

Feeder elementary districts include: Cardiff Elementary School District, Del Mar Union Elementary School District, Encinitas Union Elementary School District, Rancho Santa Fe Elementary School District, and Solana Beach Elementary School District.

== Board of trustees ==
The district is governed by a five-member school board, called the Board of Trustees. Since 2017, trustees are elected directly by voters from five separate areas within the district's boundaries.

The current board trustees include Rimga Viskanta, Jodie Williams, Jane Lea Smith, Michael Allman, and Phan Anderson. Williams and Smith are board president and vice president, respectively. Williams was elected to a first term, and Allman was reelected to a second term in November 2024. Anderson, Smith, and Viskanta were elected to the board in November 2022. Williams succeeds Katrina Young, elected to the board in 2020, after she announced she would not be seeking reelection in 2024.

Viskanta is a policy analyst, and former board member for the Encinitas Union School District. Williams is an attorney and former EUSD board member. Smith is a businesswoman, and former school teacher and administrator. Allman was former chairman, president, and CEO of Southern California Gas Company at Sempra Energy. Anderson is a software engineer.

== Leadership and staff ==
The president of the board of trustees is Jodie Williams. She has served as president since December 2024. Williams previously was a member of the Encinitas Union School District board of trustees from 2016 to 2020. Anne Staffieri, former superintendent of the Escondido Union High School District, has served as superintendent since July 2023.

On May 10, 2023, the district announced in a press release that Anne Staffieri would serve as superintendent pending board approval of her contract beginning July 2023. Staffieri was superintendent of Escondido Union High School District from 2019 to 2023. Staffieri succeeds Tina Douglas, associate superintendent of business services, who had served as interim superintendent since April 2022.

Cheryl James-Ward, professor at San Diego State University and former CEO of E3 Civic High School, was hired in November 2021. James-Ward was placed on administrative leave in April 2022 after controversial comments she made about Asian Americans during a board workshop. Board trustees Muir, Allman, and Bronstein voted in favor, while Young voted against it. The board subsequently voted unanimously to terminate her contract on June 26, 2022, effective August 15, 2022, without cause.

The board appointed Lucile Lynch as interim superintendent in May 2021. She served in the role until the board hired James-Ward in November 2021. Lynch was preceded by Robert Haley, who served in the role beginning on November 1, 2018. He resigned in April 2021.

== School sites and properties ==
=== High schools ===
There are five high schools in the district, including four comprehensive schools and one alternative school. Although officially named academies, there is no official academic or educational difference between San Dieguito and Canyon Crest Academies and Torrey Pines and La Costa Canyon High Schools. SDUHSD uses school choice, which allows any student within the elementary and middle school boundaries to attend any of the four comprehensive high schools.

==== San Dieguito High School Academy ====
San Dieguito High School Academy (SDA), formerly San Dieguito Union High School, San Dieguito High School, and San Dieguito Academy, is the district's flagship school. Opening in 1936, the school is located in Encinitas around one mile from the coast. Similar to Canyon Crest Academy, SDHSA uses a semester class schedule, which allows students to take year-long courses in one semester. During the 2020-2021 school year, 2,059 students were enrolled.

==== Torrey Pines High School ====
Torrey Pines High School (TPHS) was established in 1974, located in the Del Mar Highlands area of San Diego. Torrey Pines enrolled 2,547 students during the 2020-2021 school year, making it the largest school in the district. It is a traditional high school, using a rotating block schedule with year-long courses. The school's rival is La Costa Canyon High School.

==== La Costa Canyon High School ====
La Costa Canyon High School (LCC), located in south Carlsbad, opened in 1996 and is the smallest high school in the district. The district's only International Baccalaureate (IB) World School, La Costa Canyon enrolled 1,834 students during the 2020-2021 school year. It is one of the district's two traditional high schools, using a rotating block schedule. La Costa Canyon is best known for its athletic programs, producing numerous professional sports players. The school's rival is Torrey Pines High School.

==== Canyon Crest Academy ====
Canyon Crest Academy (CCA) opened in 2004 in the Carmel Valley area of San Diego. The school uses the semester class schedule similar to San Dieguito Academy. During the 2020-2021 school year, CCA enrolled 2,503 students making it the second largest school in the district. Canyon Crest has been ranked the #1 high school in the state since 2018.

==== Sunset High School ====
Sunset High School is the district's alternative high school located in Encinitas.

=== Middle schools ===
The San Dieguito Union High School District currently operates five middle schools. Earl Warren Middle School is the district's first middle school located in Solana Beach. Oak Crest Middle School in Encinitas opened in 1957. Diegueño Middle School in Encinitas was established in 1985, located four miles away from La Costa Canyon High School. Carmel Valley Middle School opened in 1999 in the Carmel Valley community of San Diego. Pacific Trails Middle School was built in 2015, a half-mile away from Canyon Crest Academy.

== Recent events ==
March–June 2021

- On March 19, 2021, Area 5 trustee Kristin Gibson resigned from board, citing personal reasons. The board of trustees would have 60 days to either hold a special election or execute a provisional appointment. On March 29, 2021, the board of trustees voted 3-1 to execute a provisional appointment. Michael Allman, Mo Muir, and Melisse Mossy voted in favor of the process; Katrina Young voted against it.
- On April 22, 2021, Ty Humes was unanimously appointed to the board of trustees.
- At the April 27, 2021 special board meeting, president Mo Muir stated that the board accepted superintendent Robert A. Haley's voluntary resignation agreement effective April 30, 2021. The agreement stated he would receive one year's salary and the district would "maintain his health and welfare benefits until April 30, 2022."
- On April 30, 2021, Lucile Lynch was appointed as interim superintendent in a 4-1 vote. Allman, Humes, Muir, and Mossy voted in favor of the appointment; Young voted against it.
- On June 9, 2021, the district announced that a petition to hold a special election for the Area 5 board seat "was deemed legally sufficient." Humes was then vacated from the board.

October–November 2021

- On October 10, 2021, Cheryl James-Ward was announced as the lone finalist for superintendent. Subsequently, on October 14, 2021, the board voted 3-1 on her contract effective November 1, 2021. Allman, Muir, and Mossy voted in favor; Young voted against it.
- On November 3, 2021, Julie Bronstein won the Area 5 special election against Humes and a community member.

February 2022

- On February 10, 2022, the board selected three final trustee area maps in the 2020 census redistricting process, mandated by the California Voting Rights Act (CVRA). Maps 1C, 7, and 8 were chosen. Bronstein and Young voted against Maps 7 and 8, citing gerrymandering. Young motioned to include Map 1C in the final options, which passed unanimously 5-0. The deadline for final map adoption was March 1, 2022.
- On February 14, 2022, the board of trustees adopted Map 8 in a 3-2 vote. Allman, Muir, and Mossy voted in favor of the map; Bronstein and Young voted against it. Before the maps were adopted, superintendent Cheryl James-Ward indicated she received a letter from San Diego County superintendent of schools Paul Gothold. The letter stated the county board of education could take over the redistricting process if any delay were to occur due to litigation over the maps. Gothold also stated the county was informed that at least one of the maps considered could violate the CVRA. Days later, on February 22, 2022, a lawsuit was filed in the San Diego County Superior Court by two community members against the district. It claimed that the maps "disenfranchised" people of color and was gerrymandered.

April 2022

- On April 4, 2022, the San Diego County Board of Education voted unanimously to take over the trustee area map decision process for SDUHSD.
- On April 12, 2022, Melisse Mossy resigned from the board of trustees.
- On April 20, 2022, superintendent Cheryl James-Ward was placed on administrative leave for comments she made about Asian Americans at a diversity, equity and inclusion board workshop on April 11, 2022. The board of trustees voted 3-1. Allman, Bronstein, and Muir voted for placing her on leave; Young voted against it. The next day, the board unanimously appointed Tina Douglas, associate superintendent of business services, as interim superintendent at a special board meeting.

May–June 2022

- On May 22, 2022, an article was published by The San Diego Union-Tribune about text messages between board vice president Michael Allman and superintendent Cheryl James-Ward. The messages were read by community activist Mali Woods-Drake during public comments at the May 17, 2022 board meeting. James-Ward confirmed she sent the texts to Woods-Drake. The exchange was regarding a La Costa Canyon High School teacher's mask enforcement. Allman texted obscene language and profanity to James-Ward, and urged her to fire the teacher and the principal, Reno Medina: "I will out this SOB. End of story. Does he not know, or does he know and ignore? If he does not know, fire Medina. If he know and ignores, fire the teacher.”
- On June 26, 2022, superintendent Cheryl James-Ward was fired. The board of trustees voted unanimously 4-0 to terminate her contract, without cause, effective August 15, 2022.

August 2022

- On August 25, 2022, the board of trustees unanimously adopted a resolution regarding gun violence prevention written by La Costa Canyon High School student body presidents Andrew and Shane Baum. The resolution advocated for safe gun storage and common sense gun laws. It was the first resolution written by the community in district history.

November–December 2022

- On November 8, 2022, Rimga Viskanta, Jane Lea Smith, and Phan Anderson won election to the board of trustees. Anderson defeated incumbent Julie Bronstein in the Area 5 race.
- On December 13, 2022, Rimga Viskanta was elected as board president. The board of trustees voted 5-0.

== See also ==
- List of school districts in San Diego County, California
- List of primary and secondary schools in San Diego
- List of school districts in California
