= Carmel Valley, San Diego =

Community in San Diego, California, United States

Carmel Valley
- Community of San Diego
- One Paseo and Del Mar Highlands Town Center, two of the community’s primary shopping and dining districts, viewed from the southeast.

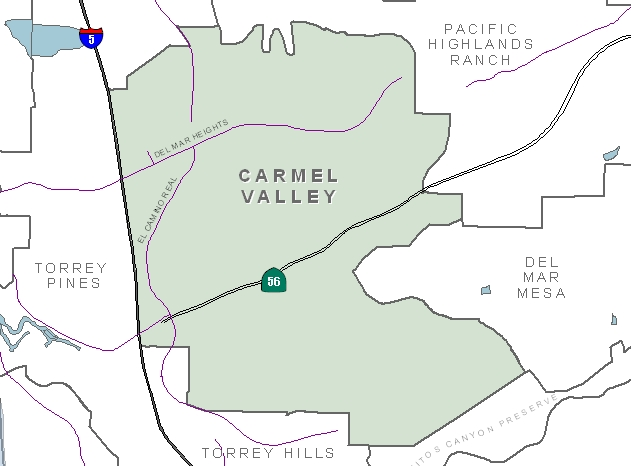
- Carmel Valley community boundaries and surrounding communities

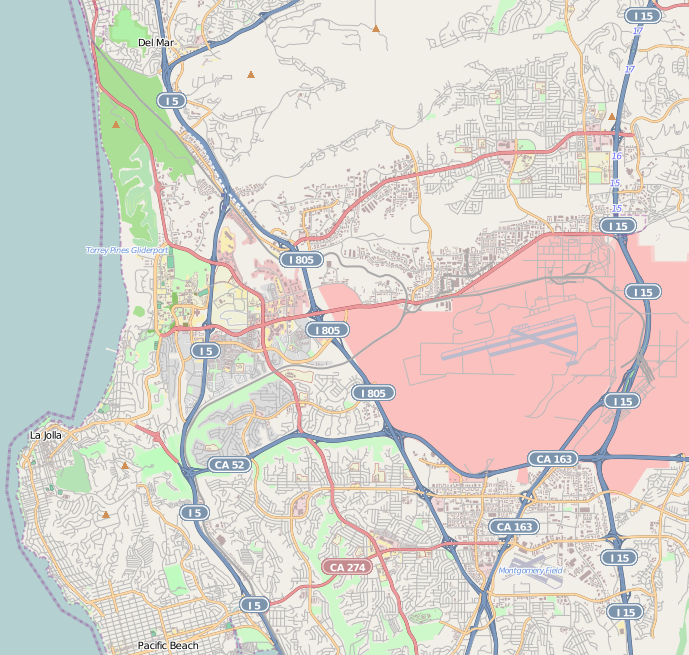
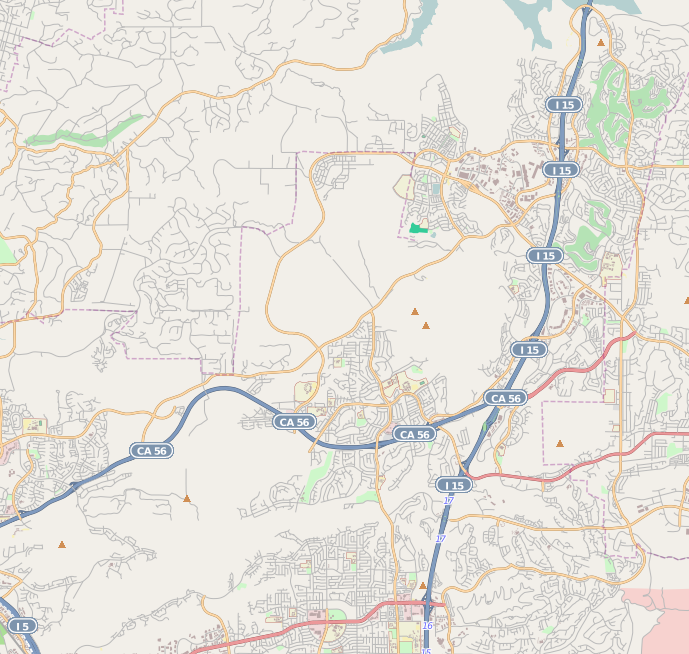
- Location within Northwestern San Diego Location within Northeastern San Diego
- Coordinates: 32.9436607°N 117.2088167°W
- Country: United States
- State: California
- County: San Diego
- City: San Diego

Government
  - Type: CA District 49

Population (2006)
  - Total: 42,047
- Time zone: UTC-8 (PST)
  - Summer (DST): UTC-7 (PDT)
- ZIP Code: 92130
- Area code: 858

Carmel Valley is a suburban planned community in the northwestern corner of San Diego, California, United States. The community is composed of commercial offices, residential units, hotels, retail stores and restaurants.

Named for Mount Carmel Ranch, a dairy farm established by the Catholic Sisters of Mercy in 1905 beneath the mesa they called Mount Carmel, now Carmel Mountain Preserve, the community was planned by the city in 1975 as North City West and built beginning in 1983, with the name Carmel Valley restored in 1991.

Carmel Valley is home to the One Paseo and Del Mar Highlands Town Center retail districts, Cathedral Catholic High School, Canyon Crest Academy, and Torrey Pines High School. The community lies at the western end of State Route 56 and Carmel Mountain Road, with Carmel Mountain Ranch at their eastern end.

== History ==
=== Ahwel-Awa ===
Native American Kumeyaay history within the area has been documented to 7,000 years ago, which was adjacent to a Kumeyaay village west of El Camino Real near the San Dieguito River in North City at the time of European contact with the Spanish known as Ahwel-Awa or ‘aqwilawa, meaning "twine house". The Portolá expedition in 1769, described it as "a large village... and many well built houses with grass roofs". The village were referred to various names by the Spanish such as Sellegua or Jellegua, and were given Christian names under Spanish rule such as San Jacome De la Marca, La Poza de Ozuna, or San Dieguito (name for the region).

Ahwel-Awa was the ancestral home of the Kwitlp clan of the Ipai-Kumeyaay people who spoke the Ipai dialect, and were one of the first Kumeyaay clans to convert to Catholicism in the 1770s under the leadership of Jamacuain "Benito" Culip, who was the kwaapay (leader) of the clan.

=== Cordero ===
After the Mexican War of Independence, the area was known to locals as Cordero as land grants were distributed to rancheros to promote settlement and dispossessed many local Kumeyaay peoples of their rights to the land. The Kwitlp clan were relocated inland into what is today, the Mesa Grande Band of Diegueno Mission Indians under the Quilp surname. The name Cordero comes from men with this surname who settled in the area in 1770s (Joaquin Ignacio, Francisco, Mariano Antonio, the sources also contain references to "Cordero brothers" that participated in the Portolá expedition), a ranch house owned by one or more of them was located to the east of El Camino Real and south of Carmel Valley Road.

Following the Mexican-American War and the California Gold rush, the area developed to support agriculture and horse farms. Some equestrian facilities remain in the area.

=== Carmel Valley ===
The name Carmel Valley comes from the Sisters of Mercy, founders of Mercy Hospital, who had come to San Diego in 1890 and in January 1899 acquired about 1,000 acres in the lower McGonigle Canyon from the McGonigle family, on favorable terms that one account attributes to the Sisters’ care of ill family members. The Sisters had named a nearby mesa Mount Carmel (later referred to as Carmel Mountain) after the Biblical Mount Carmel in present-day Israel. In 1900, they established the Carmel Valley Cemetery, north of the modern SR 56, and around 1905 built the main residence of a dairy farm, Mount Carmel Ranch.

From 1905 to 1945, the ranch supplied milk and produce to Mercy Hospital, housed elderly poor before 1916, and served as an orphanage during World War I. A botulism outbreak at the hospital in the mid-1930s was traced to the ranch’s milk, after which the Sisters leased out the operation. The main residence, a late Greek Revival farmhouse, is San Diego Historical Landmark No. 391 and was found eligible for the National Register of Historic Places in 1989. It stands at 11410 Carmel Country Road, owned by a Chabad center since 2004, while the outbuildings on Clews Ranch Road remain a horse ranch. The Sisters sold the ranch to George Gress in 1945, who sold it two years later to Ann and Robert Stephens; by then the name Carmel had attached to the valley, at first only the lower region of McGonigle Canyon.

The name extended east along Carmel Mountain Road (and later SR 56), laid out through Rancho Peñasquitos, acquired by developer Irvin Kahn in 1962, which extended into the canyon portion of present-day Carmel Valley. At the road’s eastern end, it became the namesake for Carmel Mountain Ranch, planned as Carmel Mountain East in 1971 and renamed in 1984.

Single-family homes in Carmel Valley.

In August 1970, the San Diego City Council began hearings on a development plan for Carmel Valley. Although the area was known locally as Carmel Valley, the resulting master plan gave it the institutional name North City West. It was approved by the Planning Commission on November 14, 1973, and was adopted by the City Council on February 27, 1975, covering 4,286 acres for a planned population of about 40,000 in 9 neighborhoods. The plan, influenced by urban designer Kevin Lynch, confined development to the mesa tops and preserved the canyons as open space, with Carmel Creek intended as a continuous corridor to the coast. Construction did not begin until 1983, delayed by opposition from residents and environmentalists. The first homes were built by Baldwin & Sons, followed by Pardee Homes, who owned much of the land.

In 1991, at the request of the community, the City Council restored the name to Carmel Valley. In 1999, developers agreed to transfer their approved building rights to Pacific Highlands Ranch, allowing roughly 300 acres of Carmel Mountain, the mesa the Sisters had named, to be dedicated as Carmel Mountain Preserve.

Development accelerated after SR 56 was extended east and joined to its Interstate 15 segment in 2004, connecting the community to inland San Diego.

== Geography ==
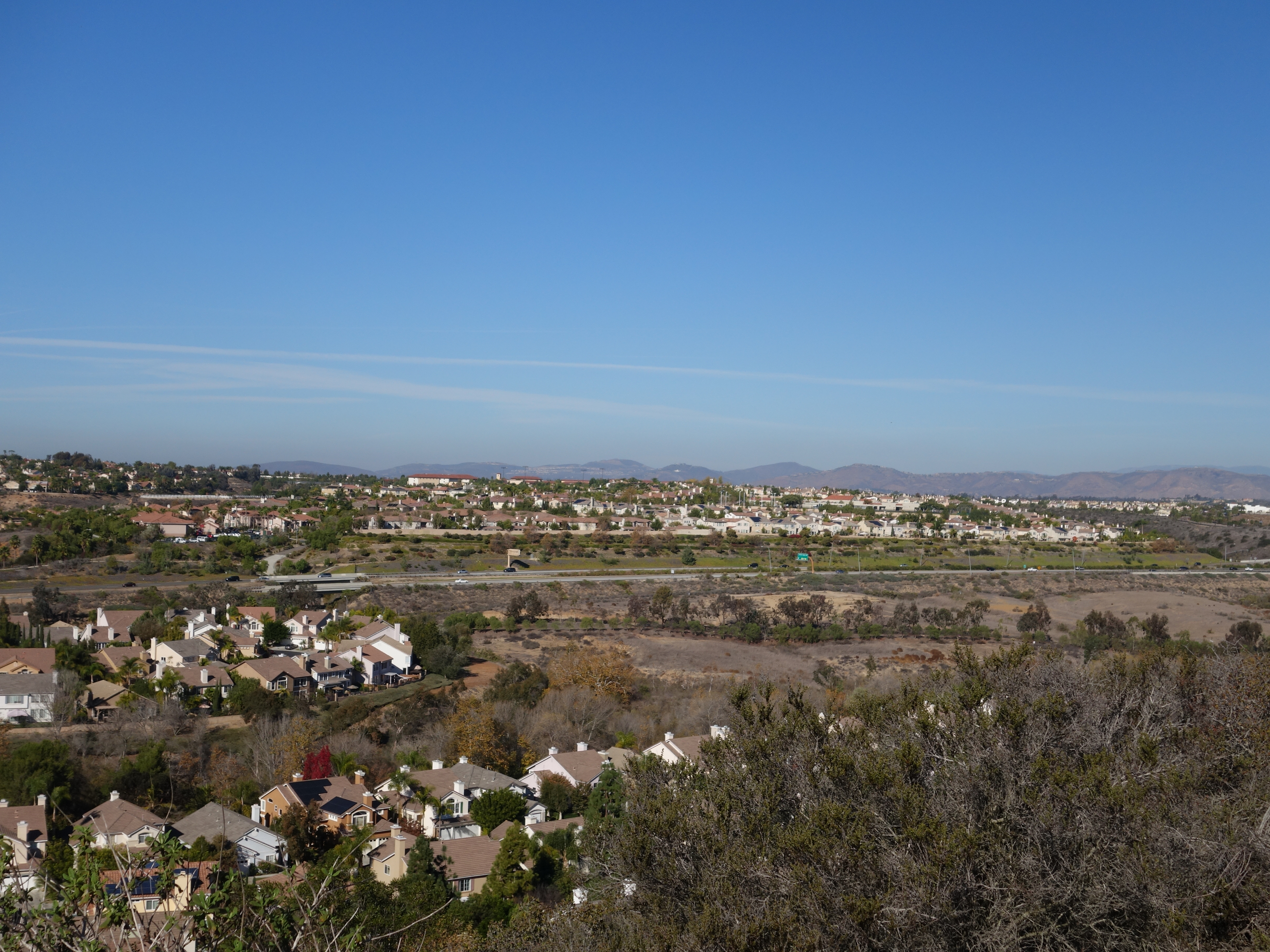
Looking north across SR 56 from Carmel Mountain; housing on the mesa tops with the canyons left as open space.

Los Peñasquitos Canyon Preserve, south of Carmel Mountain, along the community’s southern boundary.

Carmel Valley is bordered to the north by the North City Future Urbanizing Area (NCFUA) and Pacific Highlands Ranch; to the south by Los Peñasquitos Canyon Preserve and Torrey Hills; to the east by Pacific Highlands Ranch and Del Mar Mesa; and to the west by Interstate 5 and Torrey Pines. Nearby is Torrey Pines State Natural Reserve, an area in the hills which overlooks the ocean, where one of two stands of the endangered Torrey pine grows.

Carmel Mountain Road and the parallel SR 56 run east from Carmel Valley through Rancho Peñasquitos to Carmel Mountain Ranch, the two communities named for Carmel Mountain.

Colloquially, the entire 92130 ZIP code is referred to as Carmel Valley, containing Del Mar Mesa, Torrey Hills, and Pacific Highlands Ranch; the last is often treated as part of Carmel Valley proper and shares its community planning board. The community’s official boundaries, however, remain those of the 1975 community plan. The usage ends east of Pacific Highlands Ranch at Torrey Highlands, which falls in the 92129 ZIP code and is generally grouped with Rancho Peñasquitos.

== Demographics ==
According to the San Diego County Assessor's Office's 2006 estimates, there were 42,047 people living in the neighborhood, a 49.2% increase from 2000. The racial makeup of the neighborhood was 70.6% White, 18.0% Asian & Pacific Islander, 7.0% Hispanic, 3.4% from other races, 0.89% African American, and 0.001% American Indian.

The neighborhood is diverse in age with 30.2% under 18 and 6.5% over 65. The median age was 36.6. There were 2.7 persons per household. The annual median household income was $120,886.

According to the United States Census Bureau’s 2019-2023 American Community Survey, the 92130 ZIP Code Tabulation Area, which additionally includes Pacific Highlands Ranch, Del Mar Mesa, and Torrey Hills, had an estimated population of 59,768, up from 48,940 in the 2010 census. The racial makeup was 48.7% non-Hispanic White, 33.5% Asian, and 10.1% two or more races, with 9.1% Hispanic or Latino of any race. The median age was 39.7, with 27.8% under 18 and 10.4% over 65. The median household income was $201,731.

== Education ==
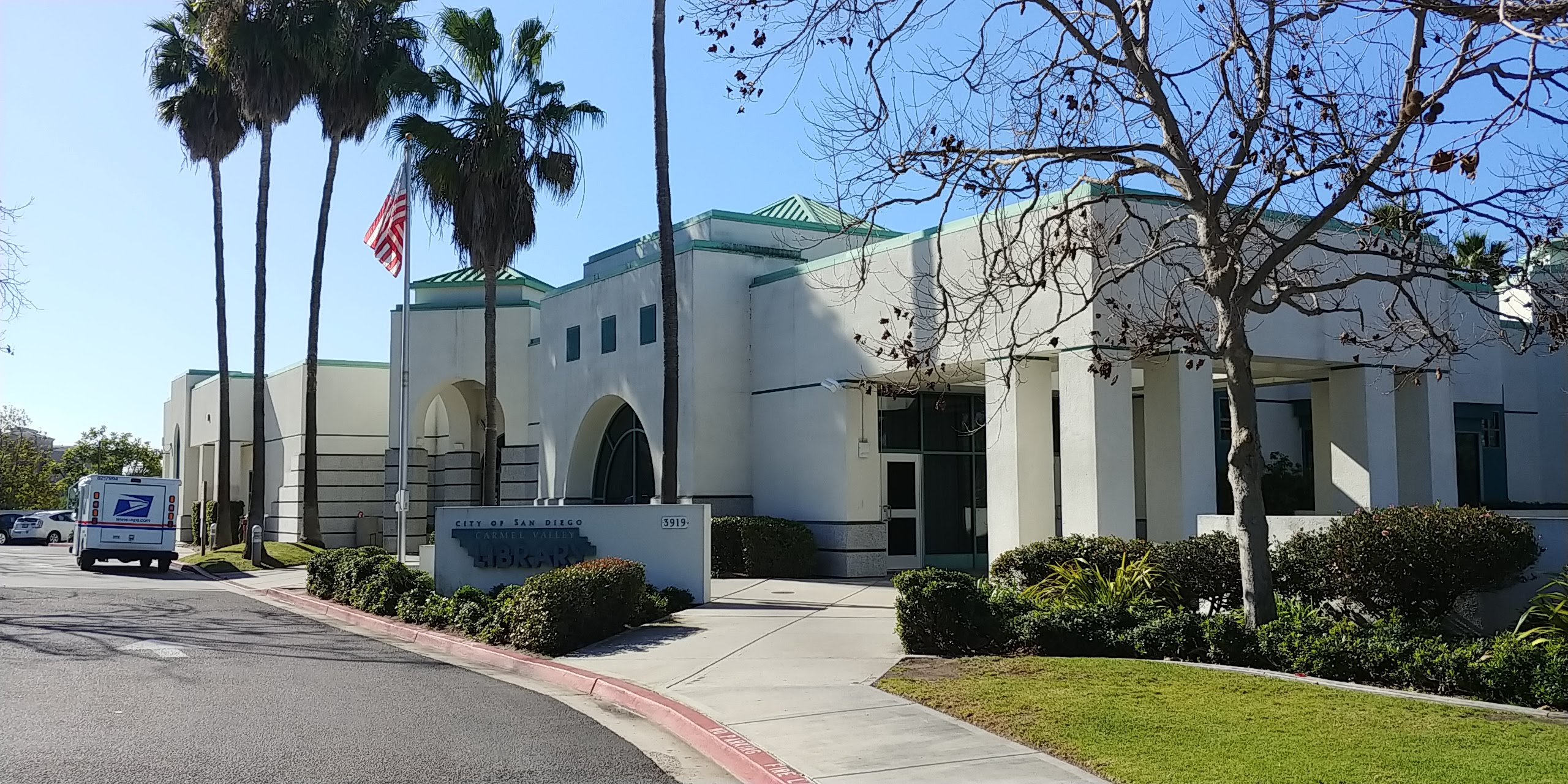
Carmel Valley Library.

Carmel Valley has an overlay of various school districts, frequently cited as a draw for families. For the elementary schools, the northern section is part of the Solana Beach School District (K-6). The southern section is managed by the Del Mar Union School District (K-6). Overlaying the entire community, the San Dieguito Union High School District manages the middle schools and high schools. Some Carmel Valley residents attend schools in the bordering communities of Pacific Highlands Ranch, Torrey Hills, and Torrey Pines.

=== Elementary schools ===
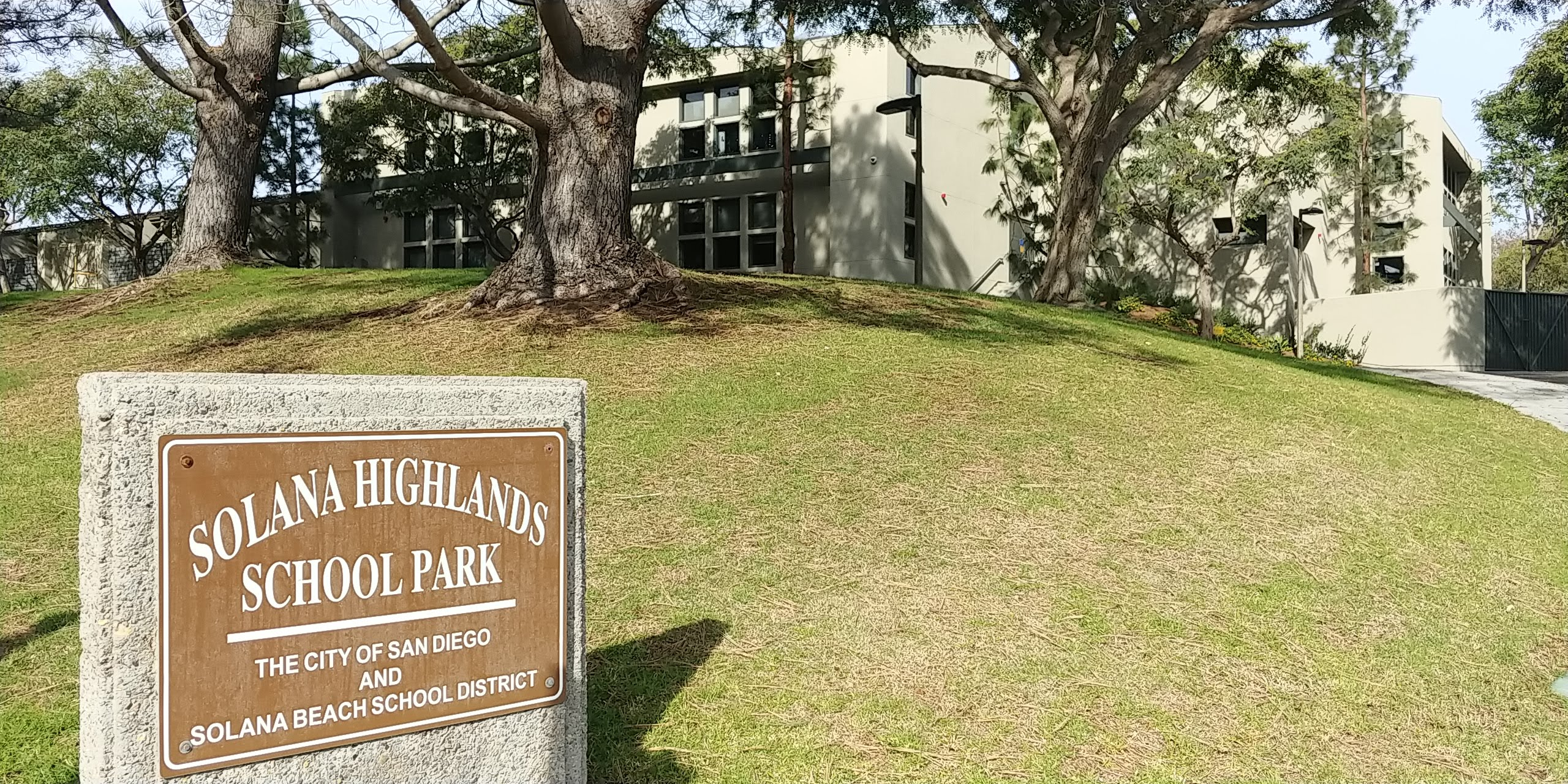
Solana Highlands Elementary School.

- Ashley Falls (Del Mar Union School District)
- Carmel Creek (Solana Beach School District)
- Carmel Del Mar (Del Mar Union School District)
- Del Mar Pines (private, nonsectarian)
- Ocean Air (Del Mar Union School District)
- Pacific Sky (Del Mar Union School District); located in Pacific Highlands Ranch
- Sage Canyon (Del Mar Union School District)
- Solana Highlands (Solana Beach School District)
- Solana Santa Fe (Solana Beach School District)
- Solana Pacific (Solana Beach School District)
- Solana Ranch (Solana Beach School District)
- Sycamore Ridge (Del Mar Union School District); located in Pacific Highlands Ranch
- Torrey Hills (Del Mar Union School District); located in Torrey Hills

=== Middle schools and junior high schools ===
- Carmel Valley Middle School (San Dieguito Union High School District)
- Pacific Trails Middle School (San Dieguito Union High School District)
- Earl Warren Middle School (San Dieguito Union High School District); located in Solana Beach

=== K–8 ===
- Notre Dame Academy (Roman Catholic)
- Del Mar Pines School (Private)

=== High schools ===
- Torrey Pines High School (San Dieguito Union High School District)
- Canyon Crest Academy (San Dieguito Union High School District)
- Cathedral Catholic High School (Catholic)
- Westview High School (Poway Unified School District)

=== K–12 ===
- San Diego Jewish Academy (Jewish)

== Economy ==
The large office, retail, entertainment and academic facilities in University City a.k.a. UTC (over 9 million sq. ft. of office space), Sorrento Mesa/Sorrento Valley (also over 9 million sq. ft.), Torrey Pines (over 2.6 million sq. ft.), and Del Mar Heights/Carmel Valley (over 4.4 million sq. ft.), together form San Diego's "North City edge city", edge city being a major center of employment outside a traditional downtown.

Among residents of the 92130 ZIP code, 77% of employed workers held management, business, science, and arts occupations in 2019–2023, with professional and scientific services (28.1%), education and health care (21.8%), and manufacturing (15.5%) the largest industries; 31.8% of workers worked from home.
