= Canyon Crest Academy =

Public high school in San Diego, California, United States

Coordinates: 32°57′27.81″N 117°11′20.46″W

Location
- 5951 Village Center Loop Rd; San Diego, California 92130; United States

Information
- Type: Public secondary
- Established: 2004
- Status: Open
- School district: SDUHSD
- Principal: Brett Killeen
- Teaching staff: 83.34 (on an FTE basis)
- Grades: 9-12
- Enrollment: 2,147 (2024-2025)
- Student to teacher ratio: 25.76
- Campus: Suburban
- Student Union/Association: CCA ASB
- Color
- Athletics: CCA Athletics
- Mascot: Rupert the Raven
- Team name: Ravens
- Accreditation: Western Association of Schools and Colleges (WASC)
- National ranking: 1st Public School in CA (Niche) 30th Public School in the U.S.
- Yearbook: Conspiracy
- Website: cc.sduhsd.net
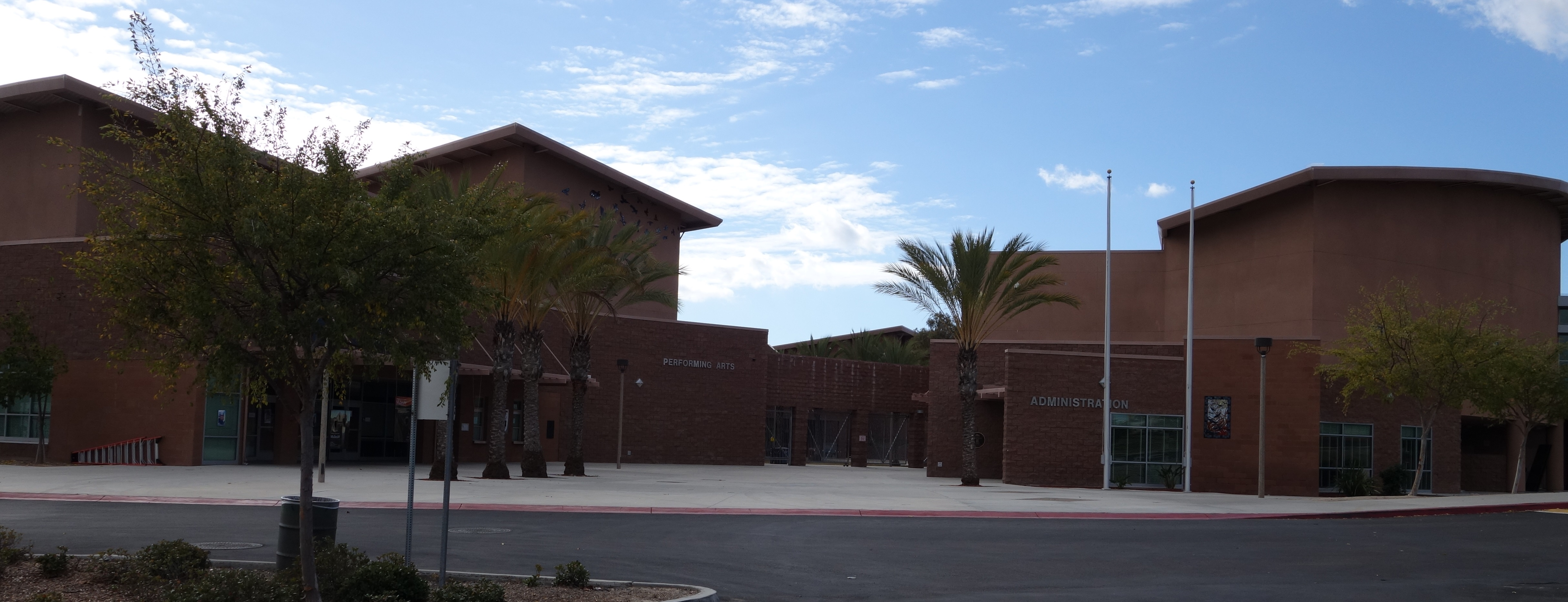

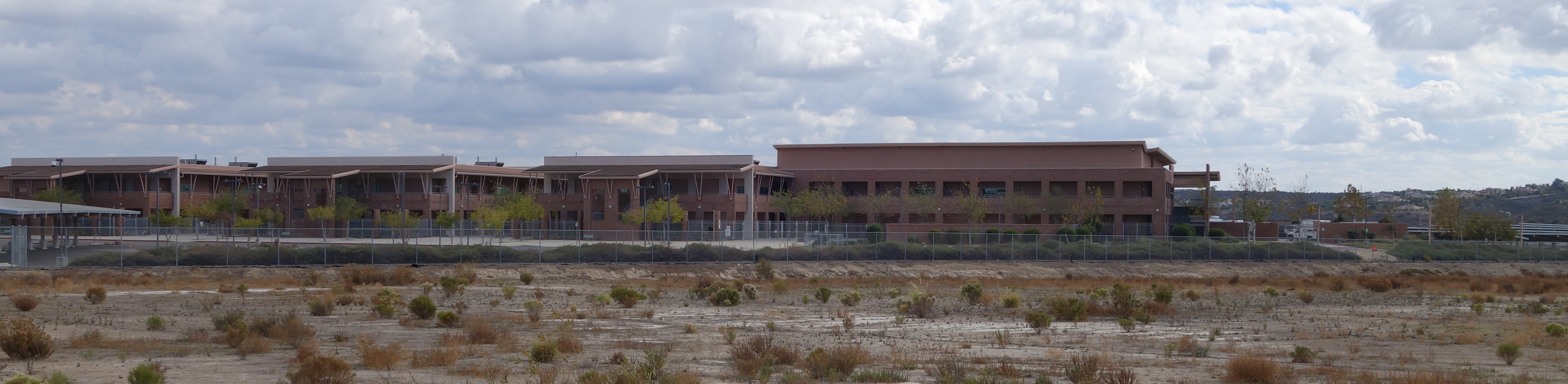

Canyon Crest Academy (CCA) is a public high school in San Diego, California. Founded in 2004, the school is part of San Dieguito Union High School District and is located in Pacific Highlands Ranch (often considered part of Carmel Valley), a residential suburb neighborhood of San Diego.

== History ==
During the first school year (2004–05) at CCA, only first-year students were admitted into the student body, with a new class being added with each subsequent year. As a result, a complete student body did not exist on campus until the fourth year of instruction (2007–08), when the first class were in their final year. During the first school year, the students were instructed in portable trailers located in the school's parking lot. All facilities were open and construction of the original buildings was completed by the end of the second school year (2005–06). The overall cost of building the campus amounted to $103 million. Until 2014, a lottery was held to determine admission to the school, as the number of students who wished to attend exceeded the school's maximum enrollment. However, as of 2014, the lottery is no longer held and all students in the district who wish to attend can do so. A new building, the B building, was added in early 2016, and was opened by August 2017, to alleviate the capacity issues.

The first group of students chose the raven as the school's mascot, after the poem by Edgar Allan Poe.

=== CCAF financial reporting concerns and student whistleblower retaliation (2024–2025) ===
In 2024, Canyon Crest Academy seniors Kevin Wang and Litong Tian published an online report questioning the financial practices and administrative fees of the Canyon Crest Academy Foundation (CCAF), a nonprofit that fundraises for school programs. After an emergency San Dieguito Union High School District (SDUHSD) board meeting in September 2024, the district announced an independent audit of all associated school foundations. The district-commissioned audit summary for fiscal year 2023–24 reported that the independent auditor’s opinion for CCAF was modified because auditors were unable to obtain all required financial information, and it also identified broader governance issues including the absence of a standardized memorandum of understanding (MOU) between the district and foundations and a lack of clear authorization terms related to facility use. In December 2025, SDUHSD approved an MOU increasing district oversight of foundations, capping administrative fees, and moving non-school facility rentals under district control (with an earlier effective date for CCAF).

Wang told KPBS that shortly after the report’s release, he was pulled out of class and taken to the principal’s office, where he said the principal tried to intimidate him into taking the report down. In reporting on the dispute, The Coast News quoted the school principal characterizing the students’ report as inaccurate and misleading, while KPBS reported that CCAF disputed the students’ findings without providing specific rebuttals.

=== PaymoneyWubby livestream gym rental use (2025) ===
In December 2025, the Canyon Crest Academy Foundation approved the rental of the school gym for a 24-hour livestreamed production organized by the online personality PaymoneyWubby; local reporting described the livestream as being broadcast on Twitch and sponsored by the adult subscription platform Fansly.

CCA principal Brett Killeen wrote to families that the production was inappropriate and said it violated standards in the district and foundation’s facilities-use agreement; an attorney for the production disputed that claim and said the production complied with the contract’s terms and limitations. The foundation’s executive director said the production had been described as “PG-13” and that the foundation was not informed of the event’s full nature in advance.

== Curriculum ==
CCA follows a semester class schedule with four classes per semester. Students can choose to take one free period per semester for a total course load of 6–8 classes a year.

== Athletics ==
CCA is a member of the Avocado West league in San Diego, along with Torrey Pines High School, La Costa Canyon High School, Carlsbad High School, San Dieguito Academy, and Sage Creek High School. The mascot of Canyon Crest Academy is the raven. Canyon Crest Academy Stadium is a multi-purpose stadium located on the school's campus.

Fall sports include Boys Water Polo, Girls Golf, Girls Tennis, Girls Volleyball, Cross Country, Girls Field Hockey, and Girls Flag Football; winter sports include Boys Basketball, Boys Soccer, Girls Basketball, Girls Soccer, Girls Water Polo, and Wrestling. Spring sports include Badminton, Boys Golf, Boys Lacrosse, Boys Tennis, Boys Volleyball, Girls Lacrosse, Baseball, Softball, Swim & Dive, Track & Field, and Beach Volleyball CCA does not have a tackle football team or cheerleading squad, but a girls' flag football team was added in the 2023-2024 school year, and the program was continued for 2024-2025, now having both a varsity and junior varsity team.

== Awards and honors ==
The Envision Music Program has been selected as one of 130 finalists nationwide for the 2008 and 2011 Grammy Signature Schools National Award for Excellence in School Music Programs.

The school's vocal and theater arts performed The Drowsy Chaperone which was nominated for the Ben Vereen Awards in 2016, with the pit orchestra winning an award, along with awards being given for many individual actors and other school shows.

Canyon Crest's average SAT score in 2015 was 1892, with the national average being 1490; the average ACT score was a 28.5 with a national average of 21.0. In 2007, the College Board announced that CCA's class of 2008 led the nation in AP World History scores for schools of its size. The AP World History: Modern teacher was Mark Van Over. The AP Calculus BC teacher was Garret Happ. This accolade was published by the College Board in the 2007 AP Report to the Nation.

- In 2012, Newsweek ranked CCA as the 97th best high school in the United States, 20th best west of the Mississippi River, and 10th best in California.
- In 2013, Newsweek ranked CCA as the 78th best high school in the United States.
- In 2014, Newsweek ranked CCA as the 72nd best high school in the United States.
- In 2015, U.S. News ranked CCA as the 89th best public high school in the United States.
- In 2018, CCA was ranked #1 in California and #132 nationally; however, private schools were also included in the rankings.
- In 2019, CCA was ranked the best public high school in California.
- In 2021, CCA was again ranked the best public high school in California.
- On February 25, 2015; Canyon Crest Academy broke the world record for the biggest group hug in a school library. The record set was 191, beating the previous record of 74.

== Student body ==
CCA's demographic is dominated by White and Asian students from the surrounding neighborhoods of North San Diego County such as Carmel Valley, Torrey Hills, Rancho Santa Fe, Del Mar, Solana Beach, and Encinitas. Before 2014, if the number of students who desired to attend CCA after middle school exceeded the number of spaces, a lottery was held. However, the lottery has not been necessary since 2014 and all students who wished to attend were able to. The average graduating class size is about 600 students.

CCA awards GPAs based on a 4.0 scale, with AP or weighted classes on a 5.0 scale.

== Notable alumni ==
- Riley Adams, baseball player
- Matt Dinerman, broadcaster
- Ryn Weaver, singer
- Lili Simmons, actress (did not complete)

== See also ==
- Primary and secondary schools in San Diego, California
