= Waldorf School of San Diego =

Coordinates: 32°44′36″N 117°05′08″W

- 3547 Altadena Ave; San Diego, California 92105; United States

Information
- Type: Private, Waldorf school
- Established: 1981
- Enrollment: 284
- Website: waldorfsandiego.org

Waldorf School of San Diego (WSSD) is an independent Waldorf school located in the Oak Park of San Diego, California, United States. It offers preschool/kindergarten through 12th grade, and had an enrollment of 284 in 2011. Founded in 1981, it is one of approximately more than 250 independent North American and 1,000 worldwide Waldorf schools. The school is an accredited member school of the Association of Waldorf Schools of North America.

In September 2008, the school inaugurated its high school program with Grade 9.

The school has received financial support and guidance from the Rudolf Steiner Foundation.

The Waldorf School of San Diego also serves as a campus for the Waldorf teacher training program of the Waldorf Institute of Southern California.

== Curriculum ==
The curriculum of the Waldorf School of San Diego is based on the educational philosophy developed by Rudolf Steiner. Each grade provides educational activities that are designed to respond to the physical, emotional, intellectual and spiritual needs at that stage of the children's development. The visual arts, music and other performing arts, and handcrafts are emphasized, as well as traditional subjects including reading, English, history, mathematics, science, and geography.

The hallmark of a Waldorf education is the schooling of the head, heart and hands. The school's goal is not only to develop each child's intellect but to ensure that they will engage themselves in the world with an open heart. Working with the hands is one of the ways to develop the neurological passageways that establish the foundation of thinking. Conscious development and training of the hands using diverse mediums such as copper work, stained glass, beeswax, woodwork, blacksmithing, and felting, leads to enhanced cognition and understanding for the students. Another hallmark is the integration of an artistic component into every academic subject, even history, math and science. This keeps the students interested and engaged in the most difficult topics exciting and fun.

The early childhood program is play-based so that each child can develop vital social and emotional skills, as well as artistic and imaginative skills (the foundation for memory and retention). The focus is also on building a strong, healthy physical body through plenty of outdoor play, bio-dynamic gardening, daily movement in circle time with songs, verses and games, and organic food served daily. The fine and gross motor skills are refined so that a foundation is laid for the academic work that begins in grade 1.

In grades 1-8, there is no testing or grading, so the work done by each student comes from a genuine love of learning. The Main lesson teacher who leads most of the academic work consistently assesses each student's progress throughout the year, and parents receive a substantial year-end report. There is also a short written report from each of the 7-8 Special Subjects teachers.

The school's gardening program has included instruction in biodynamic composting and a project to plant fruit trees on the campus.

Following the strong foundation of early childhood and the elementary grades, the students are well prepared for the rigorous academic work brought in high school, where they receive a broad and rich education. In high school, the students are developmentally ready for testing and grading, which is documented in mid-year and year-end report cards - all closely monitored by the student in conjunction with each subject teacher (up to 14 different teachers, each an expert in their field of study). The social and community service that is an integral part of the high school journey helps the teenager navigate adolescence with a warm heart and a sense of purpose. The end result is an enlivening education which puts a high value on Waldorf students at colleges and universities across the country and abroad.

Curriculum related field trips begin in grade 1 and continue through to grade 12. There is a particular focus on sustainable outdoor adventure, along with social and community service in the two week trips at the end of grade 8 and grade 11.

The school offers a wide variety of sports, including track and field, golf, soccer, swimming, tennis, water polo, and dance. Beginning in the 6th grade, students may join the girls' or boys' basketball team, or the co-ed soccer team, all of which compete in local leagues.

== See also ==
- Waldorf education
- Curriculum of the Waldorf schools

== Additional articles ==
- High School on the Horizon: Waldorf to Break Ground Soon, Vision Magazine, December 2007. Accessed 2008-09-23.
- San Diego Magazine, January 2011. Accessed 2011-12-20.
