= Rancho Santa Fe Elementary School District =

School district in California, United States

Address
- 5927 La Granada Rancho Santa Fe, California, 92067; United States

District information
- Type: Public
- Grades: K–8
- Schools: 1 elementary school (K–5), 1 middle school (6–8) on a single site
- NCES District ID: 0631740

Students and staff
- Students: 547 (2020–2021)
- Teachers: 42.78 (FTE)
- Staff: 38.75 (FTE)
- Student–teacher ratio: 12.79:1

Other information
- Website: rsfschool.net

Rancho Santa Fe Elementary School District is a public school district based in Rancho Santa Fe, California, United States. It consists of only one site, R. Roger Rowe School, which comprises a public elementary school (K–5) and a public middle school (6–8).

It includes most of Elfin Forest and Rancho Santa Fe census-designated places. It feeds into San Dieguito Union High School District.
