= San Dieguito High School Academy =

Public school in Encinitas, California, US

Coordinates: 33°2′14.82″N 117°16′30.07″W

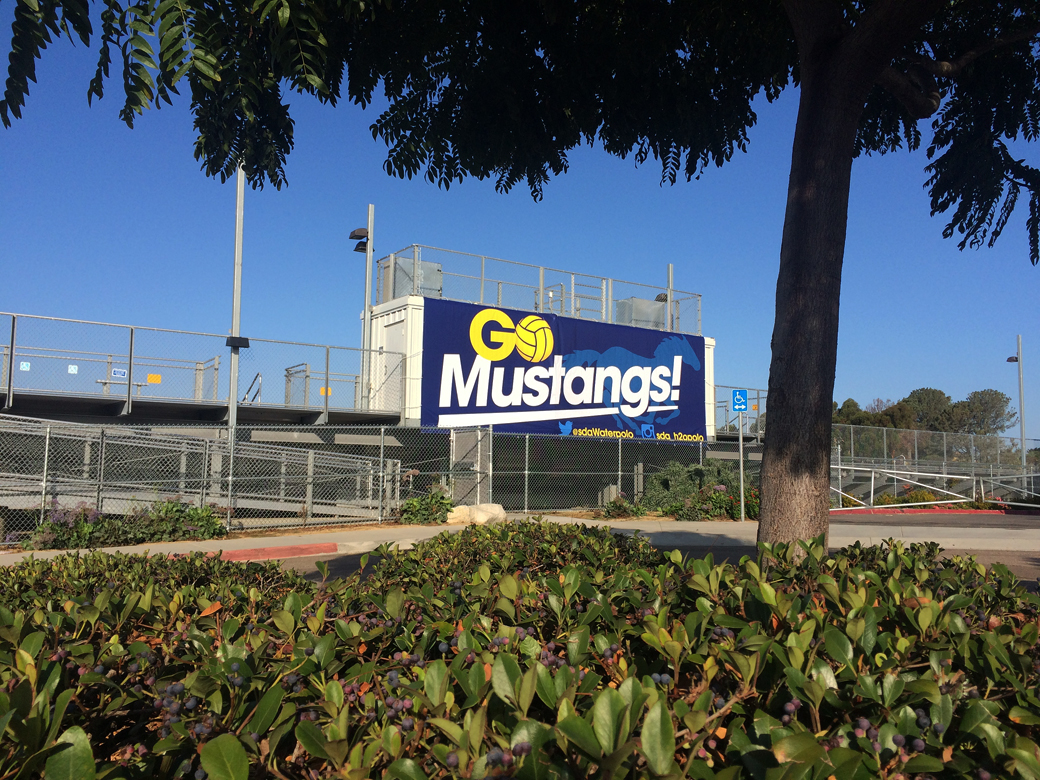
- Boys Water Polo banner at San Dieguito High School Academy in Encinitas

Location
- 800 Santa Fe Dr. Encinitas, California 92024

Information
- Type: Public
- Established: 1936
- School district: San Dieguito Union High School District
- Principal: Justin Conn
- Faculty: 115
- Teaching staff: 81.54 (FTE)
- Grades: 9-12
- Enrollment: 1,954 (2023–2024)
- Student to teacher ratio: 23.96
- Colors: Navy and White
- Mascot: Mustang
- Newspaper: The Mustang
- Yearbook: The Hoofprint
- Website: http://sd.sduhsd.net/

San Dieguito High School Academy, originally known as San Dieguito Union High School and San Dieguito High School, is a public high school in Encinitas, California. It is part of San Dieguito Union High School District. The school was established in 1936.

As of the 2020–21 school year, 2,059 students were enrolled at San Dieguito High School Academy with a senior class of over 450 students. The pupil-teacher ratio is 25:1. The average SAT score in 2013–2014 was 1840 and the average ACT score was 27. The student body is 67% White, 22% Hispanic, 4% Asian/Pacific Islander, and 5% other. During the 2020–21 school year, San Dieguito Academy's senior class had a 97.9% graduation rate.

== History ==
The school was founded in 1936 as the first public high school within the new San Dieguito Union High School District, educating students in grades 8 through 12. Since the campus had not yet been built when school started September 14, 1936, students attended classes in tents.

In 1996, San Dieguito High School was re-designed as a "school of choice" and renamed San Dieguito High School Academy to offer a student centered environment for a maximum of 1,450 students.

All students living within the district may enroll at either La Costa Canyon High School or Torrey Pines High School within their attendance areas, but they are also eligible to attend San Dieguito Academy and Canyon Crest Academy, both of which are designed to be "schools of choice." Typically, more students apply than there are available spaces, so a lottery of applicants is conducted to determine who may attend. New students with siblings that already attend SDA are automatically enrolled to the school.

Many years this lottery is challenged due to students and parents desire to go to San Dieguito Academy. In 2022 a lottery was reimplemented for the first time since 2015 because 491 students chose the school as their top choice and only 428 spots were available. This would raise the capacity to 137 more students than there were in the 2021–2022 school year. In an attempt to amend the lottery, many argued that students living within walking distance should be given priority, however, under the Open Enrollment Act of 1993, location cannot be used to prioritize individuals in a lottery.

One hallmark of a San Dieguito Union High School District academy is a "4x4" class schedule as opposed to a more traditional "rotating block schedule". This means that students may take four 90-minute classes every day during an 18-week course, completing eight classes (80 credits) a year.

In 1998, the school had roughly 1000 students, and by 2002, had 1500 (population limits of district high schools and academies are required to grow relative to the district). Fall 2003 enrollment was 1462.

In the fall of 2015, construction began on the new Math and Science building in the place of old Senior Court. Construction funded by SDUHSD voter-approved Proposition AA bond measure.

In March 2020, SDUHSD began its Distance Learning Plan by closing schools district wide. Many students were able to return to campus on January 4, 2021, in a hybrid setting, allowing students to choose to learn from home or return to campus. Students were welcomed back to campus full time at the start of the 2021–2022 school year.

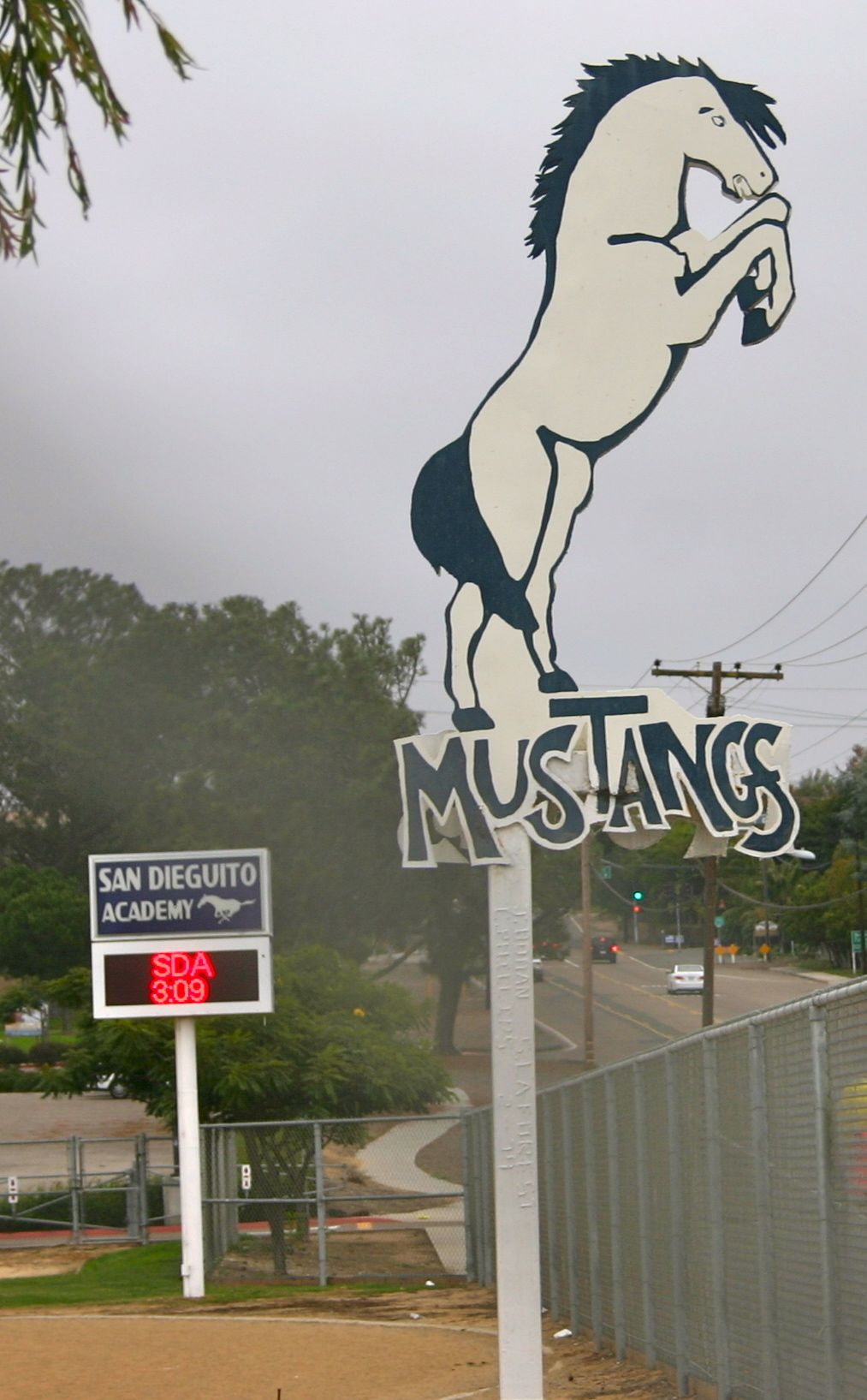
Historic Mustangs signboard before being removed in 2013 and restored in 2017

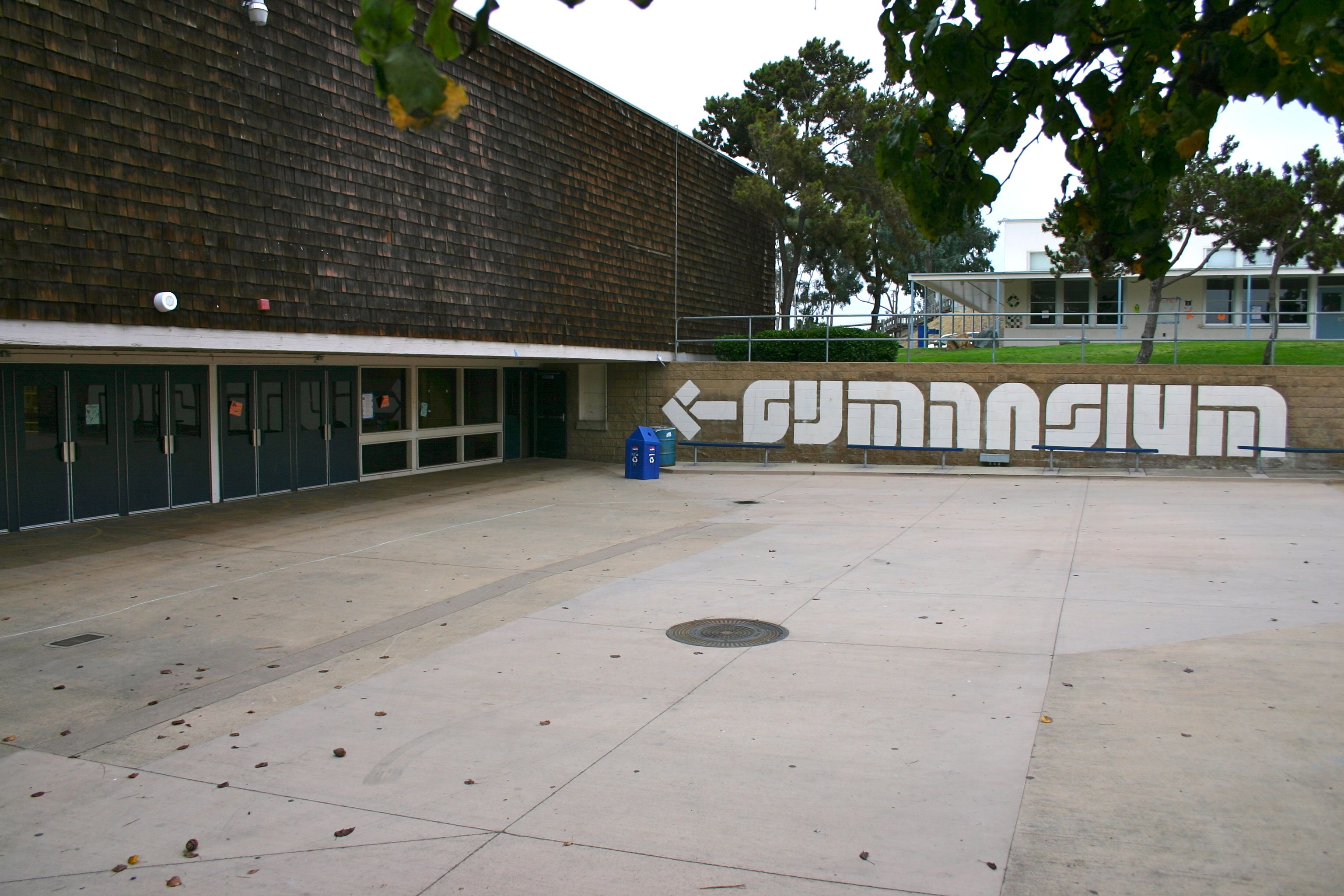
San Dieguito gymnasium

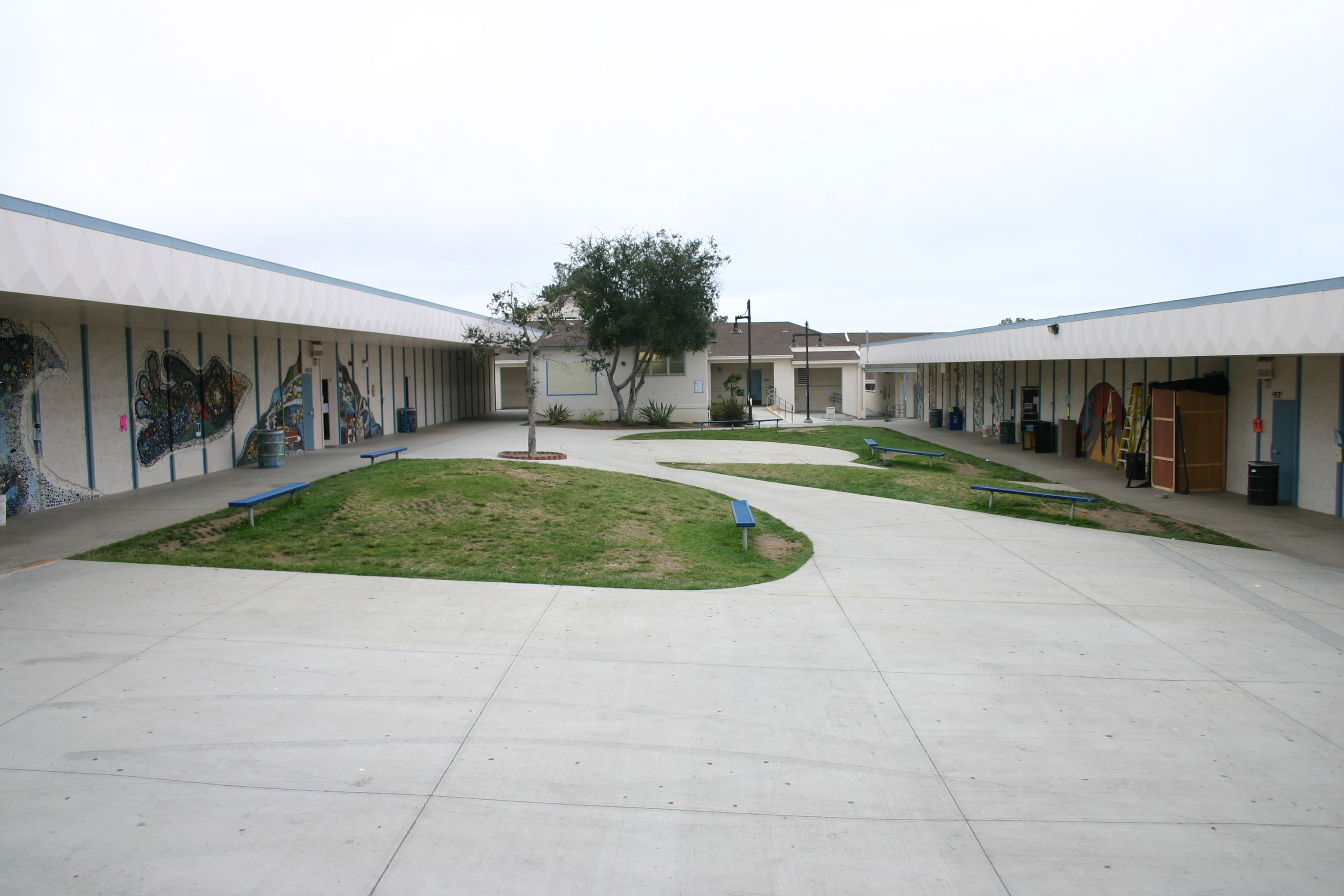
The school's senior court prior to its demolition in 2015 as part of constructing a new math and science building

== Athletics ==
San Dieguito Academy is part of the California Interscholastic Federation (CIF), and is a member of the North County Conference of the San Diego Section. The school has teams in 15 sports (one boys' team, three girls' teams, three coed teams, and eight sports with both boys' and girls' teams).

== Notable alumni ==
- Travis Browne, former UFC heavyweight fighter
- Michael Chang, former professional tennis player, winner of 1989 French Open
- Tom Dempsey, former professional football placekicker, record-setter for longest field goal ever (1970), participant in 1969 Pro Bowl
- John Fairchild, former professional basketball player, Los Angeles Lakers, 16th pick of 1965 NBA draft
- Jon Foreman, songwriter and lead singer of alternative rock band Switchfoot
- Tim Foreman, bassist of alternative rock band Switchfoot
- Tak Fujimoto, cinematographer
- Lukas Gage, actor
- Ian Goodfellow, Apple Inc. executive
- Kurt Grote, gold medalist in 400 meter medley relay swim at 1996 Summer Olympics
- Frankie Hejduk, Olympic and professional soccer player
- Chris Hillman, bass guitarist, The Byrds
- Jonathan Jones, singer/songwriter for We Shot the Moon and Waking Ashland
- Keith Kartz, former professional football player, Denver Broncos, played in Super Bowl
- Mike Kozlowski, former professional football player for Miami Dolphins, played in two Super Bowls
- Cole Liniak, former professional baseball player, Chicago Cubs Boston Redsox
- Rob Machado, former professional surfer
- Greg Minton, former professional baseball pitcher, San Francisco Giants
- Denise Mueller-Korenek, bicycle speed world record holder
- Andy Parker, former professional football player, Los Angeles Raiders and San Diego Chargers
- Jon Dette, former drummer for Slayer, Testament, and fill in drummer for Anthrax and Volbeat
- Dan Quinn, football player, MMA fighter, and boxer
- Emily Ratajkowski, model and actress
- Bridget Regan, actress, star of television series Legend of the Seeker
- Shane Salerno, screenwriter, producer, and documentary filmmaker
- Anoushka Shankar, sitar player and composer
- Jon Stanley, volleyball player, 1964 and 1968 Olympics
- Eddie Vedder, lead singer of alternative rock band Pearl Jam (dropped out senior year)
- Bryce Wettstein, Olympic skateboarder
