= Solana Beach, California =

City in California, United States

- City
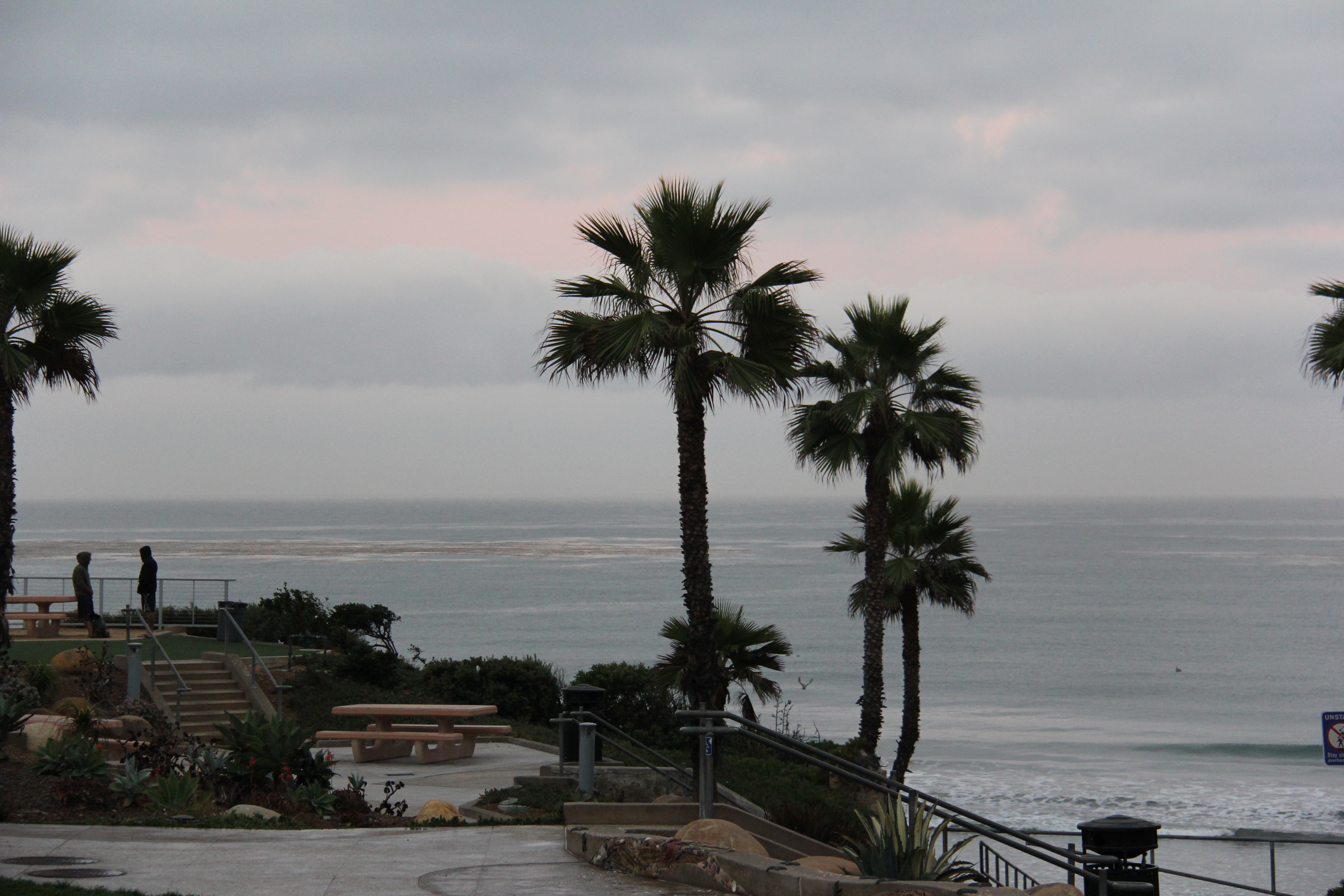
- The Pacific Ocean as seen from Fletcher Cove Beach Park, photographed in October 2013

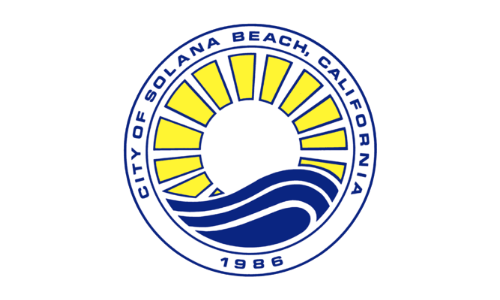
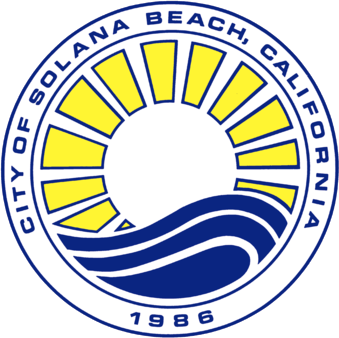
- Flag Seal
- Interactive map of Solana Beach, California
- Location in the United States Solana Beach (California) Solana Beach (southern California)
- Coordinates: 32°59′43″N 117°15′37″W
- Country: United States
- State: California
- County: San Diego
- Incorporated: July 1, 1986

Government
  - Mayor: Lesa Heebner (2024-2028)

Area
  - City: 3.52 sq mi (9.11 km^{2})
  - Land: 3.41 sq mi (8.84 km^{2})
  - Water: 0.10 sq mi (0.27 km^{2}) 2.96%
- Elevation: 72 ft (22 m)

Population (2020)
  - City: 12,941
  - Density: 3,790/sq mi (1,460/km^{2})
  - Metro: SD-TJ: 5,105,768
- Time zone: UTC-8 (PST)
  - Summer (DST): UTC-7 (PDT)
- ZIP code: 92075
- Area code: 858
- FIPS code: 06-72506
- GNIS feature IDs: 1656633, 2411923
- Website: cityofsolanabeach.ca.gov

Solana Beach (Solana, Spanish for "sunny side") is a beach city in San Diego County, California, on the South Coast. Its population was at 12,940 at the 2020 U.S. census, up from 12,867 at the 2010 census.

== History ==
The area was first settled by Indigenous people of the San Dieguito complex, early Holocene inhabitants of the area. The area was later inhabited by the Kumeyaay, who set up a village they called Kulaumai, on the southern banks of San Elijo Lagoon. During the Spanish colonial era, trails heading north near Solana Beach crossed inland to avoid the marshes and inlets of the area.

The George H. Jones family were the first European settlers in the area, arriving in 1886. Until 1923, the area had been called Lockwood Mesa. When Lake Hodges Dam was built in 1917–1918, the area began to develop rapidly. The creation of the 12,000-acre (49 km^{2}) Santa Fe Irrigation District in 1918 ensured that the area from Rancho Santa Fe through Solana Beach would prosper and expand. The coastline from Solana Beach to Oceanside began to boom in the early 1920s. In 1922 Colonel Ed Fletcher, an early community leader and developer, purchased 140 acres (0.57 km^{2}) at $20 per acre from farmer George H. Jones to develop the town of Solana Beach, with the help of his brother-in-law Eugene Batchelder. To provide access to the beach for the development, hydraulic water pressure was used to erode away tons of earth and create the Fletcher Cove entry and beach. This took one man three months with a fire hose, using water that was coming over the spillway at Lake Hodges Dam. The beach was opened with great fanfare including horse races on the beach on July 4, 1925.

The community grew slowly, but steadily throughout the rest of the century, with particular booms occurring in the decade after World War II and a real estate boom in the last quarter of the 20th century. In 1986 the community incorporated as the city of Solana Beach. That year, the city hosted the funeral services for Desi Arnaz, who had died in Del Mar. Arnaz's funeral was held at St. James Roman Catholic Church, part of the Diocese of San Diego.

The city received national news coverage in 2003 upon becoming the first city in the continental United States to enact a smoking ban on its public beaches, a trend which has continued as many other coastal California towns have followed suit in banning smoking on their beaches. Solana Beach was the last coastal community in North San Diego County to ban alcohol on the beach, doing so for at least a year in an action unanimously approved by the City Council.

On April 25, 2008, retired veterinarian and 38-year resident Dr. David Martin, 66 years old, suffered a fatal injury from an extremely rare great white shark bite while swimming with a group approximately 150 yards (140 m) off shore near Solana Beach's Fletcher Cove. The group of swimmers reportedly began their swim at Tide Beach Park to the north. Surfers in the area of Fletcher Cover noted harbor seals in the water and a wounded seal on the beach at Fletcher Cove just before the attack, the latter being a typical sign of sharks feeding in the area. Recent increases in the seal population along the Southern California coast — and the seals' tendency to swim in close proximity to human swimmers — are suspected to be contributing factors in the attack.

=== Eden Gardens ===
The neighborhood of La Colonia de Eden Gardens, also known as La Colonia and Eden Gardens, is one of the oldest residential areas of Solana Beach. The community was formed in the 1920s by Mexican farmers who were hired by the owners of large ranches in adjacent Rancho Santa Fe. These farmers wanted their families nearby, hence the formation of La Colonia (the colony). The name Eden Gardens came later from a land developer as a marketing tool. Many residents still refer to the area as La Colonia. Famous residents include Chicano rapper Lil Rob, who was born and raised in the community.

== Geography and climate ==
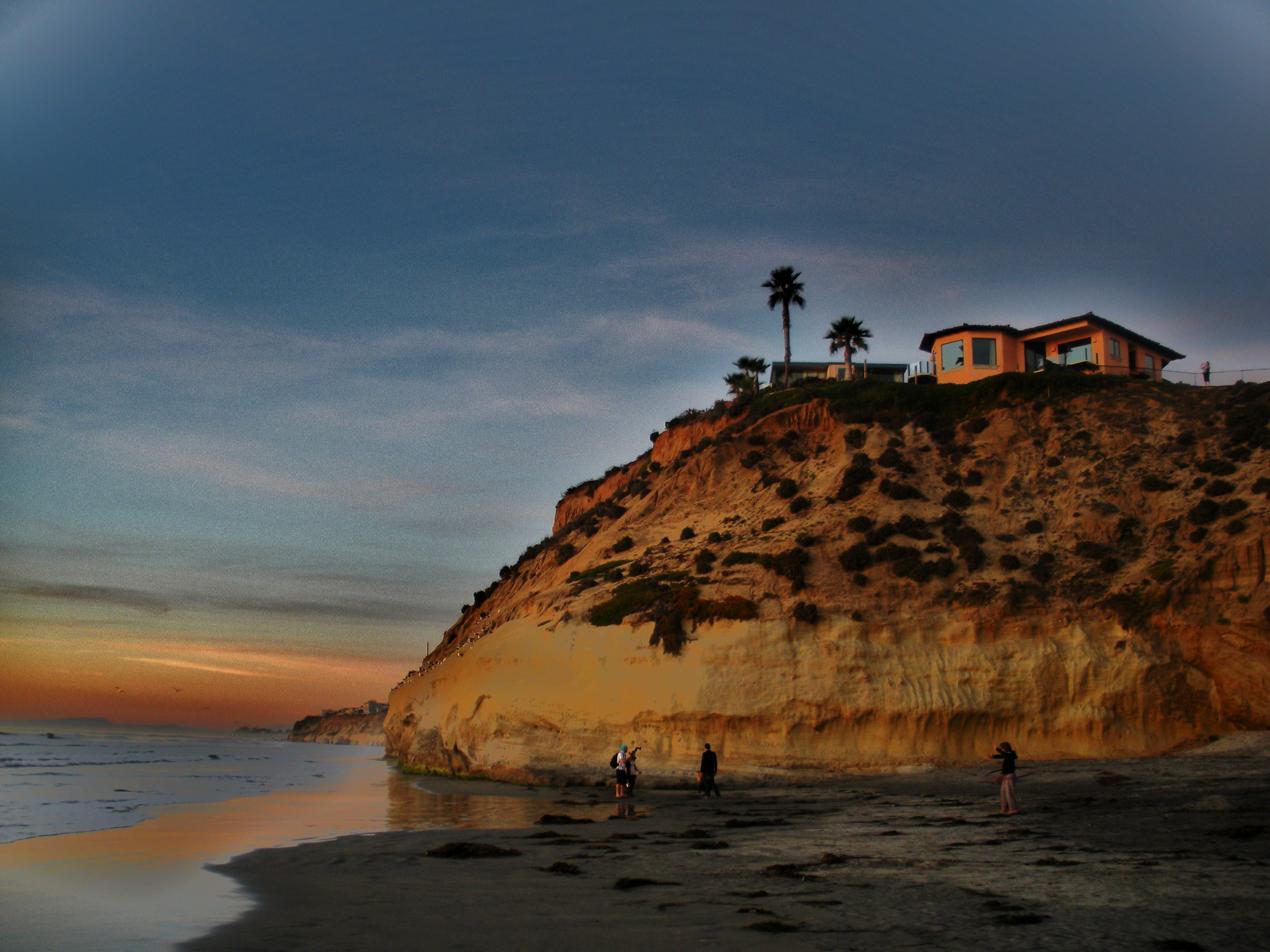
A bluff along the coast in Solana Beach

Before the city incorporated, the county allowed highly concentrated development of large condominiums atop the sandstone bluffs. Geologists studying erosion in period between 1947 and 1977 found little change in the face of the bluffs. It turned out this was a time of very few storms with very little erosion along the coast. The city has had to deal with bluffs collapsing onto the beach and damaging the improvements above. Owners threatened by wave and storm damage to the cliffs have few options.

The Pacific Ocean is to the west; the community of Cardiff-by-the-Sea to the north, and the City of Del Mar to the south. The unincorporated village of Rancho Santa Fe is located on the east side.

Solana Beach is located at 32°59′43″N 117°15′37″W (32.992937,-117.271135).

According to the United States Census Bureau, the city has a total area of 3.5 square miles (9.1 km^{2}). 3.4 square miles (8.8 km^{2}) of it is land and 0.1 square miles (0.26 km^{2}) of it (2.96%) is water.

Climate data for Solana Beach, California
Month	Jan	Feb	Mar	Apr	May	Jun	Jul	Aug	Sep	Oct	Nov	Dec	Year
Record high °F (°C)	92 (33)	94 (34)	97 (36)	103 (39)	103 (39)	105 (41)	112 (44)	109 (43)	110 (43)	105 (41)	98 (37)	90 (32)	112 (44)
Mean daily maximum °F (°C)	65 (18)	65 (18)	67 (19)	68 (20)	69 (21)	71 (22)	75 (24)	77 (25)	76 (24)	73 (23)	69 (21)	66 (19)	70 (21)
Mean daily minimum °F (°C)	46 (8)	47 (8)	49 (9)	52 (11)	56 (13)	60 (16)	63 (17)	64 (18)	62 (17)	57 (14)	49 (9)	45 (7)	54 (12)
Record low °F (°C)	25 (−4)	27 (−3)	32 (0)	36 (2)	41 (5)	41 (5)	52 (11)	54 (12)	49 (9)	39 (4)	29 (−2)	26 (−3)	25 (−4)
Average precipitation inches (mm)	2.50 (64)	2.31 (59)	2.25 (57)	0.81 (21)	0.21 (5.3)	0.09 (2.3)	0.03 (0.76)	0.11 (2.8)	0.28 (7.1)	0.40 (10)	1.03 (26)	1.35 (34)	11.39 (289)

== Demographics ==
Historical population
Census	Pop.	Note	%±
1970	5,023		—
1980	13,047		159.7%
1990	12,962		−0.7%
2000	12,979		0.1%
2010	12,867		−0.9%
2020	12,941		0.6%
U.S. Decennial Census; 1860–1870 1880-1890; 1900 1910 1920; 1930 1940 1950; 1960 1970 1980; 1990 2000 2010; 2020

=== Racial and ethnic composition ===
Solana Beach city, California – Racial and ethnic composition Note: the US Census treats Hispanic/Latino as an ethnic category. This table excludes Latinos from the racial categories and assigns them to a separate category. Hispanics/Latinos may be of any race.
Race / Ethnicity (NH = Non-Hispanic)	Pop 2000	Pop 2010	Pop 2020	% 2000	% 2010	% 2020
White alone (NH)	10,250	9,944	9,742	78.97%	77.28%	75.28%
Black or African American alone (NH)	62	56	77	0.48%	0.44%	0.60%
Native American or Alaska Native alone (NH)	29	26	22	0.22%	0.20%	0.17%
Asian alone (NH)	430	506	558	3.31%	3.93%	4.31%
Native Hawaiian or Pacific Islander alone (NH)	14	19	6	0.11%	0.15%	0.05%
Other race alone (NH)	18	23	77	0.14%	0.18%	0.60%
Mixed race or Multiracial (NH)	254	245	606	1.96%	1.90%	4.68%
Hispanic or Latino (any race)	1,922	2,048	1,853	14.81%	15.92%	14.32%
Total	12,979	12,867	12,941	100.00%	100.00%	100.00%

=== 2020 census ===
As of the 2020 census, Solana Beach had a population of 12,941 and a population density of 3,790.6 inhabitants per square mile (1,463.6/km^{2}). The racial makeup was 10,074 (77.8%) White, 82 (0.6%) Black or African American, 55 (0.4%) American Indian and Alaska Native, 571 (4.4%) Asian, 10 (0.1%) Native Hawaiian and Other Pacific Islander, 799 (6.2%) from some other race, and 1,350 (10.4%) from two or more races. Hispanic or Latino of any race were 1,853 people (14.3%).

The whole population lived in households. There were 5,646 households, of which 24.6% had children under the age of 18 living in them. Of all households, 48.4% were married-couple households, 7.1% were cohabiting couple households, 27.4% had a female householder with no spouse or partner present, and 17.1% had a male householder with no spouse or partner present. About 30.0% of households were one person, and 13.4% were one person aged 65 or older. The average household size was 2.29. There were 3,450 families (61.1% of all households).

The age distribution was 17.9% under the age of 18, 6.7% aged 18 to 24, 22.5% aged 25 to 44, 29.3% aged 45 to 64, and 23.6% who were 65 years of age or older. The median age was 47.2 years. For every 100 females, there were 93.3 males, and for every 100 females age 18 and over there were 90.2 males.

There were 6,574 housing units at an average density of 1,925.6 units per square mile (743.5 units/km^{2}), of which 5,646 (85.9%) were occupied. Of the occupied units, 62.5% were owner-occupied and 37.5% were occupied by renters. Of all housing units, 14.1% were vacant, with a homeowner vacancy rate of 1.0% and a rental vacancy rate of 7.8%.

100.0% of residents lived in urban areas, while 0.0% lived in rural areas.

=== 2023 ACS estimates ===
In 2023, the US Census Bureau estimated that the median household income was $150,820, and the per capita income was $93,265. About 2.5% of families and 5.5% of the population were below the poverty line.

=== 2010 census ===
At the 2010 census Solana Beach had a population of 12,867. The population density was 3,550.7 inhabitants per square mile (1,370.9/km^{2}). The racial makeup of Solana Beach was 11,039 (85.8%) White, 60 (0.5%) African American, 62 (0.5%) Native American, 513 (4.0%) Asian, 19 (0.1%) Pacific Islander, 738 (5.7%) from other races, and 436 (3.4%) from two or more races. Hispanic or Latino of any race were 2,048 persons (15.9%).

The whole population lived in households, no one lived in non-institutionalized group quarters and no one was institutionalized.

There were 5,650 households, 1,323 (23.4%) had children under the age of 18 living in them, 2,730 (48.3%) were opposite-sex married couples living together, 360 (6.4%) had a female householder with no husband present, 193 (3.4%) had a male householder with no wife present. There were 325 (5.8%) unmarried opposite-sex partnerships, and 42 (0.7%) same-sex married couples or partnerships. 1,745 households (30.9%) were one person and 647 (11.5%) had someone living alone who was 65 or older. The average household size was 2.28. There were 3,283 families (58.1% of households); the average family size was 2.85.

The age distribution was 2,378 people (18.5%) under the age of 18, 738 people (5.7%) aged 18 to 24, 3,518 people (27.3%) aged 25 to 44, 3,829 people (29.8%) aged 45 to 64, and 2,404 people (18.7%) who were 65 or older. The median age was 43.7 years. For every 100 females, there were 97.5 males. For every 100 females age 18 and over, there were 95.3 males.

There were 6,540 housing units at an average density of 1,804.7 per square mile, of the occupied units 3,401 (60.2%) were owner-occupied and 2,249 (39.8%) were rented. The homeowner vacancy rate was 1.4%; the rental vacancy rate was 6.3%. 7,919 people (61.5% of the population) lived in owner-occupied housing units and 4,948 people (38.5%) lived in rental housing units.

== Economy ==
The Cedros Design District is located in Solana Beach, and consists of more than 85 art galleries, import and antique stores, boutiques and cafes. The Design District is also home to the Solana Beach Farmers Market, which operates every Sunday from 12pm to 4pm and offers locally grown fresh cut flowers, baked goods, organic produce and veggies. Another prominent venue on Cedros Avenue is the Belly Up, a live music space operating since 1974.

The headquarters of Nisus Software, developers of the Nisus Writer word processor for the Apple Macintosh, are located in Solana Beach.

== Arts and culture ==
The city has hosted a free annual community event, Fiesta Del Sol, for the past 40+ years. The festival is a two day event filled with activities for children, food, and performances from over a dozen local entertainers. The festival includes interactive games, rides, and entertainment.

Solana Beach hosts a free annual summer concert series known as "Concerts at the Cove," held at Fletcher Cove Park.

Solana Beach operates a Junior Lifeguard Program offering an ocean safety curriculum that includes beach and ocean safety, CPR, and first aid training..

== Government ==
Solana Beach is a general-law city operating under a Council-Manager form of government. The City Council serves as a legislative body and consists of five Council members, one of whom is chosen to act as Mayor for a one-year term on a rotating basis.

In the state legislature, Solana Beach is located in:

- the 38th senatorial district, represented by Democrat Catherine Blakespear.
- the 77th Assembly district, represented by Democrat Tasha Boerner.

In the United States House of Representatives, Solana Beach is in California's 49th congressional district, represented by Democrat Mike Levin.

== Education ==
Solana Beach is served by the Solana Beach School District and the San Dieguito Union High School District.

=== High schools ===
Public high schools serving the area are Canyon Crest Academy, San Dieguito Academy, and Torrey Pines High School. Santa Fe Christian Schools is a private school serving ages K-12.

=== Middle school ===
- Earl Warren Middle School
- Saint James Academy

=== Elementary schools ===
- Skyline Elementary School
- Solana Vista Elementary School
- Saint James Academy

== Transportation ==
Solana Beach is served by Amtrak's Pacific Surfliner and Coaster commuter rail at Solana Beach station. Interstate 5 is a major freeway bisecting the community.

== Notable people ==
- George Brent, actor
- Jim Dennis, Hall of Fame harness racing driver
- Patrick J. Hannifin, United States Navy Vice admiral
- Patti Page, singer
- Lil Rob, rapper
- Julian Sayin, Quarterback for the Ohio State Buckeyes
