= Torrey Pines High School =

Public high school in San Diego, California, United States

Location
- 3710 Del Mar Heights Rd; San Diego, California 92130; United States; 32°57′28″N 117°13′30″W

Information
- Type: Public secondary
- Motto: WeAreTp We Take Pride BringTheChaos
- Established: 1974
- School district: SDUHSD
- Principal: Rob Coppo (RESIGNED)
- Faculty: 220
- Grades: 9–12
- Gender: CoEd
- Enrollment: 2,644 (2023-2024)
- Campus: Suburban
- Student Union/Association: Torrey Pines ASB: TPASB.com
- Colors: Cardinal and gold
- Athletics: Division I, Open Division
- Mascot: Freddy The Falcon
- Nickname: Falcons
- Accreditation: California Acc., Blue Ribbon
- National ranking: Volleyball: #1
- Newspaper: The Falconer
- Yearbook: Freeflight
- Affiliations: AP Capstone, College Board Advanced Placement
- Website: tp.sduhsd.net

Torrey Pines High School is a public secondary school in the North County area of San Diego, California. The school is named after the Torrey pine tree that grows in the area. Torrey Pines High School is a member of the San Dieguito Union High School District and serves the communities of Rancho Santa Fe, Del Mar, Fairbanks Ranch, Solana Beach, and Carmel Valley in San Diego County. Students from Encinitas may attend as well.

Torrey Pines is one of five high schools in its district, the others being San Dieguito Academy, La Costa Canyon High School, Sunset High School and Canyon Crest Academy.

== Academics ==
The school is a three-time National Blue Ribbon School and a California Distinguished School. In 2005, Torrey Pines was ranked as one of the 100 Best High Schools in the nation by Newsweek magazine. In 2012, Torrey Pines appeared as 110th and in 2011, as 90th. In 2015, Torrey Pines was ranked 336th. In 2016, Torrey Pines was ranked No. 284 nationally and #43 in California. Torrey Pines offers 26 Advanced Placement courses and had a 2012–2013 API score of 895. That same year, Torrey Pines seniors scored an average of 1860 on the SAT I, with 41 and 31 of them being recognized as National Merit Scholarship Semifinalists and Finalists respectively.

In December 2006, Torrey Pines received the Claes Nobel School of Distinction Award from the National Society of High School Scholars (NSHSS)

In 2007, Torrey Pines had students designated AP scholars by the College Board. Torrey Pines is well known for its numerous AP advanced students. In the 2013–14 school year, 72% of seniors took at least one AP exam at their time at high school, with 5.1 being the average of exams taken per test taker. 84% of AP exams taken were passed.

== History ==
Prior to 1936, students in all of coastal North County went to high school in Oceanside, California, as the areas of Carmel Valley and Torrey Hills were not developed for several decades.

In 1936, the San Dieguito Union High School District was created and San Dieguito High School in Encinitas opened to serve students living in Del Mar, Solana Beach, Rancho Santa Fe, and Encinitas. It remained the only high school in the district until Torrey Pines High School opened in 1974.

Based on population growth in the late 1960s and early 1970s, and projections, a second high school was needed. At the time, San Dieguito High School and Earl Warren Middle School were forced to do double sessions to deal with the shortage of space. Earl Warren at the time also had the ninth grade freshman class attending its school.

In the early 1970s after two defeats, a bond issue placed on the ballot finally passed. A location was chosen at what seemed out-of-the-way at the time; however, the location was based on the projected growth of what was then known as “North City West” – commonly known today as Carmel Valley.

Torrey Pines High School opened in the fall of 1974. The architecture reflects the era with stained/painted wood and the avocado greens, yellow, and orange decor popular in the era 1970s. When it initially opened, access to the school came from the original alignment of the two-lanes only Black Mountain Rd., but the access road was later modified when Del Mar Heights Rd. was extended east.

The architecture of the school was considered modern at the time. Design features included an open courtyard and wide hallways with large carpeted podium-like benches one could sit on. The classrooms had no windows, and many did not have doors. It also had its own Black Box Theater. The large library (the Media Center) was considered state-of-the-art at the time. In 2016, construction began on the Media Center to build a new exterior and entrance. Construction was completed December 2016.

There were many logistical problems in its initial opening, including an immediate shortage of classrooms and lockers, and lack of a food service building and a football stadium. As a result, portable classrooms and a bank of vending machines were used. Football games were played at San Dieguito High School. The school rid of all lockers in the 1990s.

In the 1980s, the school expanded. Various changes include the Media Center building's expansion towards Del Mar Heights Rd., the addition of a parking/transportation area, the repurposing of portable classrooms into athletics and weight rooms, the addition of a football stadium, and the conversion of the original black box theater into a lecture hall (with a second black box theater, a converted machine shop, later added in the Arts building). In 2003, Building E and G were built. Stairs were added to the main building. In the summer of 2008, more stairs were constructed leading from the parking lot nearest Del Mar Heights Road to the English building.

In November 2012, Prop AA, a $449 million bond initiative aimed at improving the public school district, was passed by tax payers. Since then, ongoing construction is taking place to include a performing arts center (the PAC), culinary arts center, revamping the student/front entry way, building more science and technology based classrooms, building a weight room, and moving classrooms in temporary buildings into permanent structures. The school's newly constructed Performing Arts Center opened on May 1, 2019.

== Demographics ==
Torrey Pines High School has a primarily White, Asian, and Hispanic student body. Students from the districts of Del Mar, Solana Beach and Rancho Santa Fe school districts, with the exception of the area north of Escondido Creek in the Rancho Santa Fe School District, are eligible to attend.

The student body is largely reflective of the surrounding area of Torrey Pines, characterized mainly by a level of affluence. Most adults in the area are highly educated, and a strong majority have a bachelor's and master's degree. The median household income is over $100,000.

In the 2019–20 school year, there were 2,479 students (58.7% White, 21.4% Asian, 14.3% Hispanic, 1% Black, <2% Other) attending Torrey Pines High School.

== Publications ==
=== The Falconer ===
The Falconer is the monthly school newspaper. It placed first at the 1995 JEA/National Scholastic Press Association (NSPA) Spring National High School Journalism Convention in San Diego and again in March 1999 at the Spring National High School Journalism Convention in Phoenix. It placed first once again at the 2009 JEA/NSPA Convention and received a Pacemaker Award at the 2010 convention in Kansas City, Missouri. It also placed first at both the spring 2012 JEA/NSPA Convention in Seattle and the spring 2014 JEA/NSPA Convention in San Diego. At the fall 2017 spring JEA/NSPA Convention in Dallas it placed 8th in the nation. At the fall 2018 JEA/NSPA Convention in Chicago it placed 7th in the nation. The Falconer placed 6th at the 2022 fall JEA/NSPA Convention in St. Louis and 8th at the 2023 spring JEA/NSPA Convention in San Francisco. It won the NSPA Pacemaker award in 1998, 2000, 2001, 2002, 2003, 2004, 2005, and 2010.

=== First Flight ===
First Flight is the school literary magazine. Its 2005–06 edition placed first in the 2006 JEA/NSPA Fall National High School Journalism Convention in Chicago, Illinois and the 2006–07 edition won first place Best in Show at the 2007 JEA/NSPA Fall National High School Journalism Convention in Nashville, Tennessee. First Flight again won first place Best in Show at the 2010 JEA/NSPA Fall National High School Journalism Convention in Kansas City, Missouri. At the spring 2018 JEA/NSPA Convention in San Francisco it placed 4th in the nation.

== Notable faculty ==
- David Carson (1982–1987), graphic designer

== Notable alumni ==
- Ryan Abadir, former CS:GO player for Cloud9
- John Allred, retired NFL player for the Chicago Bears (1992)
- Rachel Buehler, member of 2008 gold medal Olympic Women's Soccer Team (2003)
- Chris Dudley, retired NBA player for the New York Knicks (1983)
- Hayden Epstein (born 1980), ex-NFL kicker for the Denver Broncos (1998)
- Taylor Fritz (born 1997), professional tennis player
- David Gilboa, co-founder of Warby Parker (1999)
- Joshua Groban, California Supreme Court justice
- Tony Hawk, professional skateboarder (1986)
- Muni He, Chinese professional golfer on the LPGA tour.
- Glen Hirshberg, writer of literary fiction and horror (1984).
- Chad Hutchinson, ex-St. Louis Cardinals pitcher and Dallas Cowboys quarterback, Stanford University (1995)
- Sara Jacobs, Representative for California's 53rd congressional district
- Jake (born 1996), retired professional Overwatch player for Houston Outlaws, Overwatch League caster (attended 2010-2014)
- BC Jean (born c. 1987), singer-songwriter
- Poomi Jensen, grandson of the King of Thailand (2001)
- Sirikitiya Jensen, member of the Thai Royal Family (2003)
- Adam Johnson, retired MLB player for the Minnesota Twins (1997)
- Nick Kerr, basketball head coach (2011)
- Michael Kim (born 1993), golfer
- Matt Kunitz, television creator and executive producer, best known for Fear Factor and Wipeout (2008 U.S. game show) (1986)
- Matt Lauter, college football tight end for the Boise State Broncos (2021)
- Michelle Lee, plastic surgeon and TV personality (2000)
- Jamie Lovemark, professional golfer, 2007 NCAA champion
- Tom Luginbill, ESPNU college football analyst (1992)
- John Lynch, retired all-pro safety for the Tampa Bay Buccaneers & Denver Broncos and general manager of the San Francisco 49ers (1990)
- Catarina Macario, soccer player for Lyon and the United States national team.
- Marco Notarainni, college football linebacker (2021)
- Pat Perez, professional golfer (1994)
- Scot Pollard, sportscaster and retired NBA player (1993)
- Tristan Prettyman, singer/songwriter (2000)
- Avalon Robbins, model and actress (2019)
- Jason Ross, DJ and record producer (2007)
- Cecilia Rouse, economist and 30th Chair of the Council of Economic Advisers (1981)
- Andy Schatz, video game designer
- Kerry Simmonds, gold medalist in Women's Rowing at 2016 Summer Olympics (2007)
- Armistead Burwell Smith IV, musician, member of Pinback and Three Mile Pilot
- Taylor Steele, surfing videographer: "King of surf cinema"
- CJ Stubbs (born 1996), Major League Baseball catcher for the Washington Nationals (2015)
- Garrett Stubbs (born 1993), Major League Baseball catcher for the Philadelphia Phillies (2011)
- Ray Suen, multi-instrumentalist (2004)
- Finn Sullivan, basketball player (2018)
- Soren Thompson (born 1981), Olympic and world champion épée fencer (1999)
- Shaun White (born 1986), professional snowboarder and skateboarder (attended 2001–02)
- Carson Williams (born 2003), professional baseball player (2021)
- Taylor Williamson, stand-up comic and actor (2004)
