= Cathedral Catholic High School =

Private school in San Diego, California, United States

Location
- 5555 Del Mar Heights Road; Carmel Valley, San Diego; 92130; United States; 32°57′37″N 117°12′1″W

Information
- Former name: University of San Diego High School
- Type: Private; Coeducational
- Motto: Scientia Pro Deo et Patria (Education For God and Country)
- Religious affiliations: Roman Catholic; Roman Catholic Diocese of San Diego
- Established: 1957 (relocated in 2005)
- CEEB code: 052896
- President: Kevin J. Calkins
- Teaching staff: 107.0
- Grades: 9–12
- Enrollment: 1,700 (2025-26)
- Average class size: 24
- Student to teacher ratio: 14.6
- Colors: Red and gold
- Slogan: Roll Dons, Once a Don, Always a Don
- Athletics: 42 sports
- Athletics conference: CIF – San Diego Section
- Mascot: The Don
- Team name: The Dons
- Rivals: Saint Augustine High School
- Accreditation: Western Association of Schools and Colleges
- Publication: El Sol (art/literary magazine)
- Newspaper: El Cid
- Yearbook: Presidio
- Tuition: $21,972
- Website: www.cathedralcatholic.org

Cathedral Catholic High School (CCHS) is a private coeducational Catholic college preparatory day school in San Diego, California, serving grades 9–12. It is operated by the Diocese of San Diego. In 1970, Cathedral Girls High School, a girls’ school dating back to 1939 and located in downtown San Diego, merged with the all-boys University High School (UHS or Uni) founded in 1957. In 1971, the newly constituted and expanded University of San Diego High School graduated its first coeducational class. Uni, or the University of San Diego High School (USDHS), was located in the Linda Vista neighborhood of San Diego. Construction began on CCHS at its current location on Del Mar Heights Road in Carmel Valley in 1999. In 2005, the school moved to that campus and changed its name to Cathedral Catholic High School.

Cathedral Catholic High School is accredited by the Western Catholic Education Association (WCEA), the Western Association of Schools and Colleges (WASC) and holds membership with the College Board.

== History ==
=== University of San Diego High School ===
University High School (known as UHS or Uni) was founded in 1957 as a Catholic college preparatory high school for boys. It was located in the San Diego neighborhood of Linda Vista, on a site overlooking Mission Bay to the west and Mission Valley to the south, across the street from the University of San Diego which had been founded in 1949. The first principal was Reverend Father James Cadden, a scholar of church history. For the first few years of the school's existence the faculty consisted entirely of ordained priests.

Its sister-school Cathedral Girls High School had been founded in 1943 and was located on a downtown campus. In 1970 it merged with UHS to become a co-educational high school. The class of 1971 was the first co-educational graduating class in UHS history. In 1986 the name of the school was changed to University of San Diego High School (USDHS). As of 2005, over 10,000 students had graduated from the school.

Students at Uni were also afforded opportunities to participate in a wide variety of extracurricular activities including fine arts, athletics, clubs, service organizations and leadership roles. The athletic teams were the Dons, and all students and alumni were referred to as Dons, with the motto "once a Don, always a Don". In 1998 USDHS was honored by the United States Department of Education as a Blue Ribbon School.

The Linda Vista campus held 1,450 students. In 1999, the Diocese of San Diego proposed a plan to relocate the school to a larger campus. Construction was begun on a brand new campus in a location in Carmel Valley. The new school was to have larger facilities to accommodate up to 2000 students, and host many extracurricular activities and sports such as football, swim/dive, water polo, basketball, sailing, soccer, field hockey, lacrosse, softball and baseball. The majority of these activities had been holding practices and events outside of the Linda Vista campus due to the lack of facilities. Dr. Richard Kelly was the principal from 1991 to 2004, the longest-serving principal of that school. He did not transition to CCHS but facilitated the move.

=== Transition ===
The new campus was completed in the summer of 2005, and USDHS officially shut down after the 2004–2005 school year. The new school opened as Cathedral Catholic High School in August 2005, with all the same faculty, administration, and the remaining three classes of students from USDHS (Classes of 2006, 2007, and 2008). On May 31, 2008, the final class of USDHS students, who had been freshmen at the time of the transition, graduated from CCHS.

Cathedral Catholic continued all of the traditions from USDHS, including the Dons mascot for the athletic teams. The names of the yearbook (Presidio), newspaper (El Cid), and art/literary magazine (El Sol) were also preserved.

The Dons Athletic Hall of Fame was moved to the gymnasium at CCHS. The statues and relics from the old campus, such as the Mary statue from the quad, were all moved to locations around the Cathedral Catholic campus. The dedicated walk of fame from the quad at Uni was originally proposed to be moved and installed on the quad of CCHS around a new memorial fountain. But due to deterioration and costly efforts, the stones were not brought to CCHS. Those who had names there were honored with a memorial display, which was hung in the USDHS library at CCHS during the 50th anniversary celebration. Notable dedications for major Uni/CCHS contributors have been engraved into the stone benches and lamp posts around CCHS' quad as well.

The Linda Vista campus was temporarily occupied by Notre Dame Academy from June 2005 to January 2006, while that school's new campus, also in the Carmel Valley area, was being completed. In 2008 the Linda Vista campus was sold to the Irvine Company for development. The site is now the home of a 500+ unit apartment complex called Carmel Pacific Ridge.

=== Cathedral Catholic High School ===
The CCHS campus in Carmel Valley opened in 2005. It is designed to resemble a Tuscan village. The founding principal was Mike Deely, himself a graduate of USDHS; he served as principal until 2015. In 2021 the diocese appointed the school's first female principal, Marlena Conroy.

At approximately 1700 students, CCHS is the largest high school in the Diocese of San Diego. The 54-acre campus includes ten major buildings including a chapel, theater, and gymnasium.

== Academics ==
=== AP classes ===
CCHS offers Advanced Placement classes in art history, biology, calculus AB & BC, chemistry, English language, English literature, environmental science, Macroeconomics, Physics C, Spanish language, studio art, US history, US government and World history.

Dual-enrollment classes with MiraCosta College are also offered, as well as honors courses.

=== Visual and performing arts ===
Visual and performing arts classes at CCHS include drama and advanced drama 1–2, multimedia authoring 1–2, CCTV broadcast and video journalism, journalism, photography, digital imaging, art 1–2, art 3–4, ceramics, 3D design, introduction to guitar, choral music, concert and pep band, AP art history and AP studio art. After-school courses in band, journalism and Yearbook are also available.

== Student life ==
CCHS offers more than 80 extracurricular activities including music, drama, publications, and robotics.

Schoolwide masses are held on various feasts and solemnities of the Church throughout the school year. In addition to the schoolwide liturgies, daily mass and lauds (morning prayer) are held each morning before school in the St. Therese Chapel on campus.

== Athletics ==
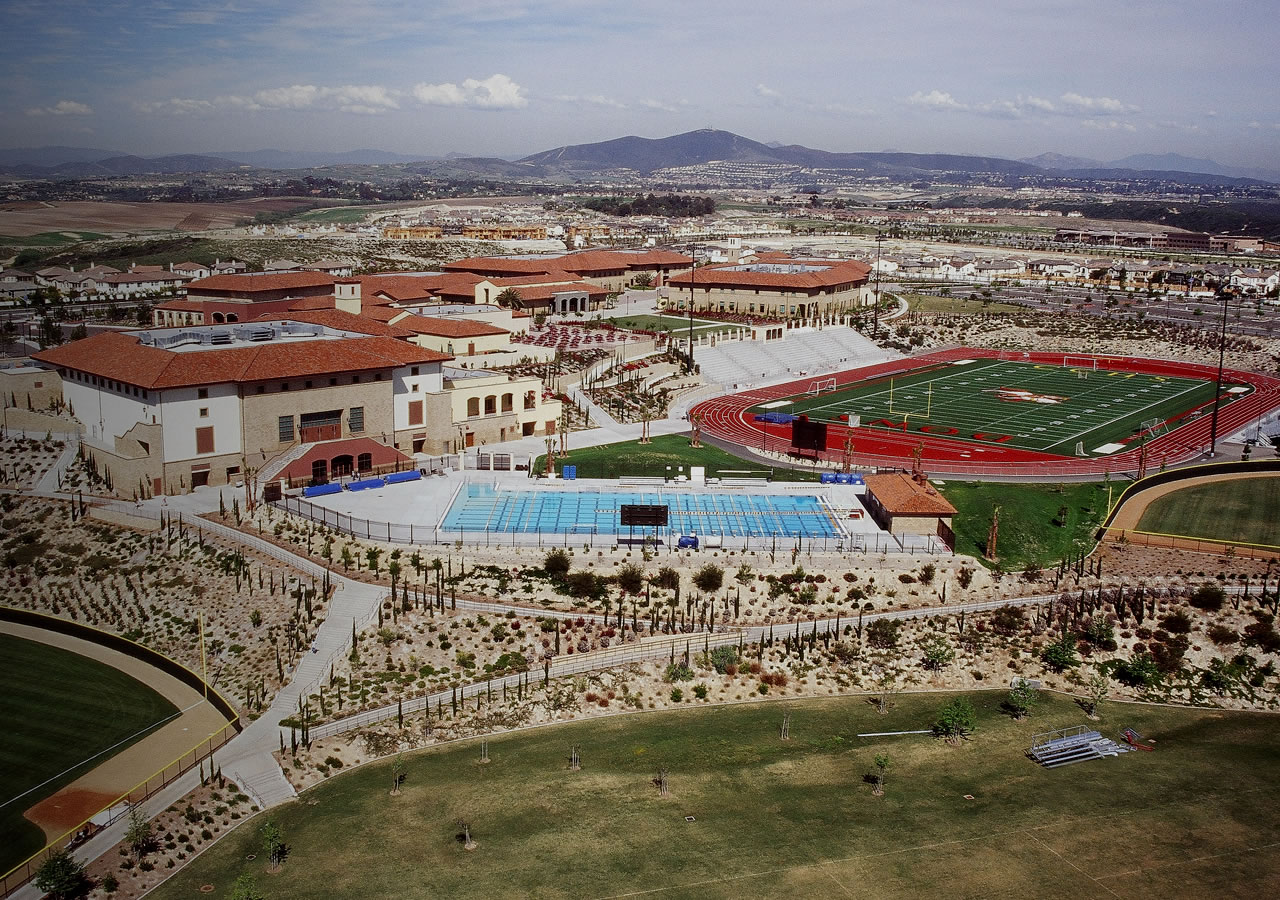
An aerial shot of CCHS's athletic facilities (2005). In the far bottom left is part of right field of the baseball diamond. At the bottom is the multipurpose practice field. In the center is the pool. On the right is left field of the softball diamond. Manchester Stadium (track and turf field) is visible in the background. The Claver Center (basketball/volleyball court, wrestling room) is opposite Manchester.

Cathedral Catholic has the following sports:

- Fall sports: cross country, field hockey, American football, women's tennis, women's golf, women's volleyball and men's water polo
- Winter sports: men's basketball, women's basketball, men's and women's soccer, rugby, women's water polo, wrestling and surfing
- Spring sports: badminton, baseball, men's golf, men's tennis, softball, swimming and diving, men's and women's lacrosse, track and field and men's volleyball
- Non-seasonal sports: sailing, cheerleading, rowing, fencing, equestrianism and dance team

Cathedral Catholic's mascot is the Don. The Dons maintain a longstanding rivalry with the Catholic all-male high school St. Augustine, known as the Saints; the high-profile annual game between the rivals is called the Holy Bowl.

Between USDHS and CCHS the Dons have won a CIF San Diego Section championship 161 times; that includes 46 championships as CCHS.

=== State champions ===
Year	Sport	Division	
2008	List of California state high school football champions	Division II	Cathedral Catholic (San Diego) def. St. Mary's (Stockton) 37-34
2016	football	Division 1-AA	Cathedral Catholic (San Diego) def. St. Mary's (Stockton) 38-35 OT
2021	football	Division 1-AA	Cathedral Catholic (San Diego) def. Folsom 33-21
2025	football	Division 1-AA	Cathedral Catholic (San Diego) vs. Folsom

== In popular culture ==
The film Miracle at Manchester is based on a true story about a student with brain cancer at CCHS, and principal photography took place there.

== Notable alumni ==
=== USDHS ===
- Raul Campillo – 2005 valedictorian, attorney and politician
- Mike Carey – football referee
- Cameron Crowe – filmmaker
- Steve Dunning – baseball player
- Billy Eppler (1993) – baseball executive
- Justin Green – football player
- Dave Kellett (1992) – cartoonist
- Gloria Calderon Kellett (1993) – television writer
- Maddie Mercado (2019) – soccer player
- Phil Mickelson (1988) – golfer
- Scott Peterson (1990) – convicted murderer
- Mark Prior (1998) – baseball player
- Carlos Quentin – baseball player
- Chris Richard – baseball player
- Kelly Rulon (2002) – water polo player
- Jerry Trainor (1995) – actor
- Moriah van Norman – water polo player
- Luke Walton (1998) – NBA player and head coach
- Barry Zito – baseball player

=== CCHS ===
- Brady Aiken – first overall pick of the 2014 MLB Draft
- Sean Bouchard – MLB first baseman and outfielder
- Ice Brady – basketball player
- Daniel Camarena – first pitcher since 1898 to hit a grand slam on his first hit
- Megan Faraimo – college softball pitcher
- Tyler Gaffney – NFL running back
- Jordan Genmark Heath – professional football player
- Stephen Gonsalves – MLB pitcher for Minnesota Twins
- Brandon McCoy – professional basketball player
- Dylan Mulvaney – internet celebrity and actress
- Marcus Ratcliffe – college football safety for the Texas A&M Aggies
- Lucky Sutton – college football running back for the San Diego State Aztecs
- Casey Toohill – NFL defensive end

== See also ==
- Primary and secondary schools in San Diego, California
