= Cardiff School District =

School district in California, United States

Address
- 1888 Montgomery Avenue Cardiff-by-the-Sea, California, 92007; United States

District information
- Type: Public
- Grades: K–6
- Superintendent: Jill Vinson
- NCES District ID: 0607470

Students and staff
- Students: 632 (2020–2021)
- Teachers: 32.4 (FTE)
- Staff: 49.75 (FTE)
- Student–teacher ratio: 19.51:1

Other information
- Website: www.cardiffschools.com

Cardiff School District is a public school district serving the community of Cardiff in the city of Encinitas, in the North County area of San Diego County, California. It consists of two schools: Cardiff Elementary (grades K-3) and Ada Harris Elementary (grades 3-6). It is managed by an elected five-member board of trustees.
