= La Costa Canyon High School =

- Carlsbad, California; United States

Information
- Type: Public
- Established: 1996; 30 years ago
- School district: San Dieguito Union High School District
- Principal: Karen DuBerke
- Teaching staff: 73.03 (on an FTE basis)
- Grades: 9–12
- Gender: Coeducational
- Enrollment: 1,642 (2023–24)
- Student to teacher ratio: 22.48
- Campus: Suburban
- Campus size: 88 acres
- Student Union/Association: LCC ASB
- Colors: Green, blue, and gold
- Athletics: 27 varsity athletic teams
- Mascot: Maverick
- Accreditation: Western Association of Schools and Colleges (WASC)
- Website: lc.sduhsd.net

La Costa Canyon High School (LCC) is a public high school in Carlsbad, California. It is an International Baccalaureate World School and is part of the San Dieguito Union High School District, serving northwestern San Diego County.

Established in 1996, La Costa Canyon serves the San Diego County communities of Encinitas, south Carlsbad, Leucadia, Olivenhain, Cardiff-by-the-Sea, and Rancho Santa Fe. It enrolled 1,642 students during the 2022–2023 school year.

== Student body ==
The student body in 2022–2023 was roughly 70.8% White, 17.8% Hispanic, 3.9% Asian, 0.8% Black, 0.5% American Indian or Alaskan Native, 0.2% Native Hawaiian or Pacific Islander, and 5,7% multiracial.

The music department includes programs in concert band, beginning guitar, rock band, musical instrument digital interface (MIDI) composition, International Baccalaureate (IB) music, colorguard, jazz band, and indoor percussion. It also hosts The Maverick Brigade, the only marching band on the district. The Maverick Brigade, as of 2023, has also been open to students from San Dieguito Academy, Oak Crest Middle School, Diegueno Middle School, and Earl Warren Middle School.

LCC students can participate in more than 45 extra-curricular student clubs, a nationally-recognized Speech and Debate program, the LCC Theatre Company, and the Peer Assisted Listeners program, Yearbook, and school broadcast network MavNation.

== Faculty and staff ==
La Costa Canyon has 110 certificated staff members and 47 full-time classified staff members. Certificated staff includes 96 teachers, five school counselors, one wellness counselor, two school psychologists, one school social worker, one speech therapist, and three assistant principals. Classified staff includes special education instructional assistants, one bilingual instructional assistant, two AVID tutors, one athletic trainer, nutrition services workers, two campus supervisors, clerical staff, custodial staff, one health technician, and one theater technician.

Justin Conn has been principal since July 2022, preceded by Reno Medina. Leo Fletes.

== Academics ==
La Costa Canyon operates 10 academic departments, including English, Math, Science, Social Sciences, Visual and Performing Arts, World Languages, AVID, Career and Technical Education, Computer Science, and Special Education. Within the school district, high school graduation requirements include 4 English courses, 3 mathematics courses, 2 science courses, 3 mathematics courses, one visual or performing arts course, 2 physical education courses, one practical art course, and 7 elective courses.

The World Languages department offers Spanish, French, and American Sign Language. The most extensive program and popular program is Spanish.

The Career and Technical Education department offers business management, software systems and development, food service and hospitality, education, graphic design, professional theater, and video film production courses.

La Costa Canyon is the only International Baccalaureate World School in the district, offering the IB Diploma Programme since the 2018-2019 school year. The first cohort of candidates graduated and earned full IB diplomas in June 2020. In July 2023, the district announced that all 13 candidates received IB diplomas, the first cohort to have a 100% passing rate.

La Costa Canyon offers college-preparatory courses, as well as honors courses that are unweighted. AP and IB Higher Level courses are weighted on a 4.0 GPA scale.

LCC offers 22 Advanced Placement (AP) courses. During the 2020-2021 school year, LCC students took 1014 AP exams, and the AP pass rate was 73%.

The pupil-teacher ratio is approximately 24:1. Approximately 95% of the students are college bound. The district does not rank students or name valedictorian or salutorian. An estimated 25 percent of the student body receives the State Seal of Biliteracy.

The school receives accreditation approval from the Western Association of Schools and Colleges (WASC). Concurrent enrollment programs are provided in large by MiraCosta College.

== Athletics ==
La Costa Canyon is a member of the California Interscholastic Federation, the governing body for high school sports in the state of California. LCC has many teams ranked highly on both a national and statewide level and has produced numerous league, CIF, and Open Division titles, and professional sports players. Over 85% of the student body competes in school sports teams and clubs.

La Costa Canyon offers the following sports:

Fall sports	Winter sports	Spring sports	Club sports
Cheerleading	Basketball	Baseball	Beach volleyball (men)
Cross country	Soccer	Softball	Rugby
Field hockey	Wrestling	Gymnastics	Dance
Football	Water polo (women)	Track and field	Surf
Water polo (men)		Lacrosse	
Volleyball (women)		Volleyball (men)	
Tennis (women)		Swim and dive	
Golf (women)		Tennis (men)	
Flag football (women)		Golf (men)	
		Beach volleyball (women)	

== Notable alumni ==
- Eric Avila, former professional soccer player in Major League Soccer
- Chase Budinger, former NBA player for the Houston Rockets, Indiana Pacers, Minnesota Timberwolves; 2024 Paris Olympics Team USA in beach volleyball.
- Dasha Burns, journalist
- Andrew Briedis, writer
- Phillip Evans, baseball player for New York Mets, Chicago Cubs, Pittsburgh Pirates
- Cubbie Fink, former bassist for Foster the People
- Samantha Ginn, actress and stage director
- Ryan Guy, former professional soccer player in the Major League Soccer
- Spencer Jones, baseball player for the New York Yankees
- Karsta Lowe, Olympic volleyball player on 2016 United States women's national volleyball team
- Erik Magnuson, NFL football player for the San Francisco 49ers
- Mickey Moniak, baseball player selected first overall by the Philadelphia Phillies in 2016 MLB draft
- Kevin O'Connell, former NFL player, current head coach of the Minnesota Vikings
- Vinny Perretta, former NFL player for the Minnesota Vikings
- David Quessenberry, NFL football player for the Houston Texans, Tennessee Titans, Buffalo Bills, Minnesota Vikings
- Scott Quessenberry, NFL football player for the Los Angeles Chargers, Houston Texans
- Sebastian Soto, American soccer player for Austria Klagenfurt
- Kendyl Stewart, swimmer for the U.S. national team
- Kenny Stills, former NFL football player for the Miami Dolphins, New Orleans Saints, Houston Texans, Buffalo Bills
- Joe Toledo, former NFL football player for the Miami Dolphins, San Diego Chargers, Green Bay Packers, San Francisco 49ers, Seattle Seahawks, Philadelphia Eagles
