= Solana Beach School District =

School district in California, United States

Address
- 309 North Rios Avenue Solana Beach, California, 92075; United States

District information
- Type: Public
- Grades: K–6
- Established: 1925
- Superintendent: Dr. Jennifer Burks
- NCES District ID: 0636990

Students and staff
- Students: 2,720 (2020–2021)
- Teachers: 137.9 (FTE)
- Staff: 205.63 (FTE)
- Student–teacher ratio: 19.72:1

Other information
- Website: www.sbsd.k12.ca.us

Solana Beach School District is a public school district based in San Diego County, California, United States, that serves the communities of Solana Beach, Carmel Valley, Fairbanks Ranch, and Rancho Santa Fe. The district was founded in 1925 and encompasses seven elementary schools and a Child Development Center. Enrollment consists of approximately 3,000 students in grades pre-kindergarten through sixth grades. The district is governed by a five-member Board of Education.

== Schools ==
- Carmel Creek
- Skyline k-6
- Solana Highlands
- Solana Pacific
- Solana Ranch
- Solana Santa Fe
- Solana Vista
