= Black Mountain =

Black Mountain may refer to:

== Places ==
=== Australia ===
- Black Mountain (Australian Capital Territory), a mountain in Canberra
- Black Mountain, New South Wales, a village in Armidale Regional Council, New South Wales
- Black Mountain, Queensland, a locality in the Shire of Noosa
- Kalkajaka National Park also known as Black Mountain National Park, in Shire of Cook, Queensland

=== Canada ===
- Black Mountain, one of two named summits forming the Cypress Mountain Ski Area in West Vancouver, British Columbia
- Black Mountain, a mountain near Horsefly Lake in the Cariboo region of the Central Interior of British Columbia
- Black Mountain, a summit west of the south end of Shuswap Lake in the Southern Interior of British Columbia
- Black Mountain, a mountain on the east side of Kelowna in the Okanagan Valley of British Columbia
- Dark Mountain, formerly known as Black Mountain, in the Cassiar Country of northern British Columbia
- Coquihalla Mountain, formerly known as Black Mountain, in the Yale Division Yale Land District of southwestern British Columbia

=== India ===
- Kalapahar, Manipur, town in Manipur, literally Black Mountain

=== Iran ===
- Arasbaran, mountain range in Iran, known as Qaradagh (Black Mountain) in Azeri language
  - Karadaghis, Azeri tribe living in the region

=== Ireland ===
- Clermont Carn, County Louth, also known as Black Mountain

=== Montenegro ===
- Montenegro, literal translation of the country's name
  - Црна Гора or Crna Gora, literally 'Black Mountain', nickname of its national basketball team

=== Norway ===
- Svartfjellet, Kvaløya, a mountain near Hammerfest whose name translates literally to "[the] Black Mountain"

=== Pakistan ===
- Tor Ghar, also known as Kala Dhaka, historically known as Black Mountain of Hazara
  - The Black Mountain tribes

=== Slovakia ===
- Black Mountain, Slovakia, a mountain range in the Slovak Ore Mountains

=== Turkey ===
- Nur Mountains, historically known as the Black Mountain

=== United Kingdom ===
- Black Mountain (Belfast), a mountain beside Belfast, Northern Ireland
  - Black Mountain (District Electoral Area)
  - Black Mountain transmitting station, a transmitter on top of the mountain
- Black Mountain (hill), a 703-metre (2300') peak in the Black Mountains range, the only peak on the English-Welsh border
- Black Mountain (range), a mountain range in South and West Wales
- Black Mountain, a townland in County Antrim, Northern Ireland

=== United States ===
- Black Mountain (Alaska), a summit in Glacier Bay National Park
- Black Mountain, a peak in the Little Ajo Mountains, Arizona
- Black Mountain (Maricopa County, Arizona), a mountain
- Black Mountain (Pima County, Arizona), a mountain
- Black Mountain (Fresno County, California), a ridge
- Black Mountain (Inyo and Fresno counties, California), on Sierra crest
- Black Mountain, a mountain of the El Paso Mountains, Kern County, California, part of the Mojave Desert
- Black Mountain (Mono County, California), a summit in Hoover Wilderness
- Black Mountain (San Benito County, California), a summit
- Black Mountain Wilderness (San Bernardino County, California), a mesa and surrounding wilderness area in the Mojave Desert
- Black Mountain Open Space Park, a summit within the city limits of San Diego
- Black Mountain (San Diego County, California), a summit in San Diego County, but outside the San Diego city limits
- Black Mountain (near Los Altos, California), a summit on Monte Bello Ridge in the Santa Cruz Mountains
- Black Mountain Ranch, San Diego, California, a community in San Diego city's northeast
  - Black Mountain Open Space Park, the community's city park
- Black Mountain (Milpitas, California), in eastern Santa Clara County
- Black Mountain, a San Francisco Bay Area summit in Marin County
- Black Mountain and Little Black Mountain, several San Francisco Bay Area summits in Sonoma County
- Black Mountain (Moffat County, Colorado), a mountain in Moffatt County
- Black Mountain (Park County, Colorado), a mountain in Park County
- Black Mountain (Georgia), a mountain in Dawson County
- Black Mountain (Kentucky), highest point in the Commonwealth of Kentucky
- Black Mountain of Maine, a ski area in Rumford, Maine
- Black Mountain (Michigan), a large hill in Presque Isle County, Michigan
- Black Mountain (Missouri), a summit in Madison County, Missouri
- Black Mountain (Montana), a summit in Park County
- Black Mountain (Nevada), a mountain in southern Nevada
- Black Mountain Ski Area, Jackson, New Hampshire
- Black Mountain (Catron County, New Mexico)
- Black Mountain (Hamilton County, New York)
- Black Mountain (Washington County, New York)
- Black Mountain, North Carolina, a town near Asheville, North Carolina
  - Black Mountain College (1933–1957), a school founded in 1933 in Black Mountain, North Carolina
  - Black Mountain poets, sometimes called projectivist poets, a group of mid-20th-century poets centered on Black Mountain College
- Black Mountain, a mountain in the Blue Mountains and one of the highest points in Oregon
- Black Mountain (Jeff Davis County, Texas), a summit in the Davis Mountains
- Black Mountain (Washington), a summit in the Glacier Peak Wilderness
- Black Mountain Conservation Area, a protected mountain in Dummerston, Vermont, abutting the West River
- Black Mountain (West Virginia), a summit in Pocahontas County

== Sports venues ==
- Black Mountain Golf Club, a golf facility in Hua Hin, Thailand

== Entertainment ==
- Black Mountain (band), a Canadian psychedelic-rock band
  - Black Mountain (album), a 2005 debut rock album by the band
- "Black Mountain Side", Jimmy Page guitar solo
- Songs from Black Mountain, a 2006 album by Live
- Black Mountain poets, a group of mid-20th-century American postmodern poets
- The Black Mountain (novel), a 1954 Nero Wolfe mystery novel by Rex Stout
- The Black Mountain (film), a 1994 Chinese film by Zhou Xiaowen

== Other ==
- Battle of the Black Mountain, a 1794 battle in Capmany, Catalonia, Spain
- Black Mountain Monpa ('Olekha), an endangered Tibeto-Burman language of western Bhutan
- Black Mountain College, a former private college in North Carolina (1933–1957)
  - Black Mountain: An Exploration in Community, 1972 book by Martin Duberman about the college
- Kalapahar (lit. 'Black Mountain'), 16th-century Muslim general of the Bengal Sultanate

== See also ==
- Black Mountains (disambiguation)
- Black Peak (disambiguation)
- Black Volcano, an inactive volcano near Albuquerque, New Mexico
- Black Hill (disambiguation)
- Black Hills (disambiguation)
- Black Rock (disambiguation)
- Back Mountain, a region in Luzerne County, Pennsylvania, U.S.
- Čierna Hora (disambiguation), which has the same meaning in Slovak
- Černá Hora (disambiguation), which has the same meaning in Czech
- Crna Gora (disambiguation), which has the same meaning in Serbo-Croatian and Macedonian
- Mali i Zi (disambiguation), which has the same meaning in Albanian
- Kala Dhaka (Black Mountain of Hazara)
- Kara Dag (disambiguation), same in Turkic languages
- Montenegro (disambiguation), which has the same meaning in many Romance languages
- Mount Black, in Antarctica
- Mount Black (Tasmania)
- Qaradağlı (disambiguation), alternate Turkic form
- 黑山 (disambiguation), alternate East Asian form
- Heishan (disambiguation)
- Czarna Góra (disambiguation)
