= Gorkhas in Manipur =

People of Gorkkha descent in Manipur, India

ꯃꯅꯤꯄꯨꯔ ꯒꯣꯔꯈꯥꯁꯤꯡ
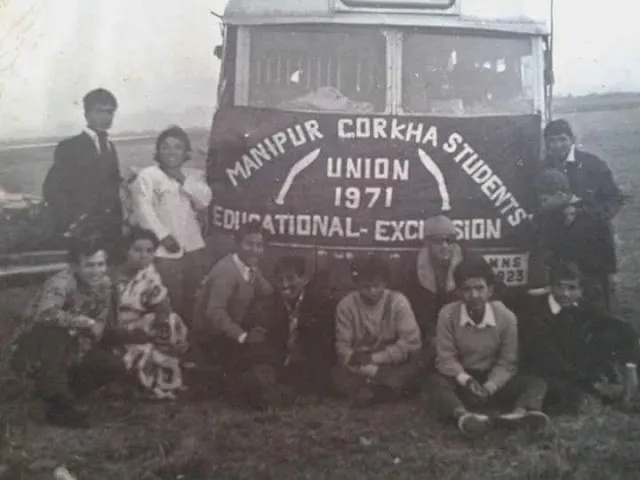
- Gorkha Students Union in Manipur

Total population
- 63,756 (2011)

Regions with significant populations
- Kangpokpi, Senapati, Imphal valley

Languages
- Nepali, Meiteilon

Religion
- Hinduism

Related ethnic groups
- Indian Gorkhas

Gorkhas or Nepalis are the largest non-tribal community other than the Meiteis in the state of Manipur.

== History ==
In 1819, a Burmese army under General Maha Bandula invaded Manipur during the expansion of Burmese power under Bagyidaw. Marjit Singh was defeated and fled to Cachar, while Chourajit Singh later redistributed the confiscated territories among the Manipuri princes. On 5 March 1824, the First Anglo-Burmese War was declared, and the British allied with Gambhir Singh to expel the Burmese from Manipur. A group known as "Raja Gambhir Singh's Levy" joined the British forces at Badarpur in April 1824 and advanced towards Manipur under Lieutenant R. B. Pemberton. The force reached Maklang in June 1825 and drove the Burmese out of Manipur, restoring Gambhir Singh to power.

The arrival of Nepalis or Gorkhas in Manipur is traced to at least 1819, though some traditions place their presence in the region much earlier. The first organised batch of Gorkhas came during the reign of Raja Gambhir Singh in 1824, when soldiers of the 16th Sylhet Local Battalion, later the 8th Gorkha Rifles, were incorporated into Gambhir Singh's Police Levy. To strengthen Manipur's defences against Burmese incursions, Gambhir Singh raised an army in 1825 and recruited Gorkhas from Sylhet; the force became known as the "Victoria Paltan". Contemporary records, including the Cheitharol Kumbaba, mention Gambhir Singh entering the capital in December 1825 accompanied by British officers and hosting a feast for the "Four Victoria Battalion".

The Gorkhas earned the confidence of the British administration and were employed not only as soldiers and guards for Political Agents but also as cooks, milkmen, traders and agriculturists. Their population in Manipur increased significantly after the transfer of the 23rd, 43rd and 44th battalions of the 8th Gorkha Rifles to the region around 1880. Official records of the Chief Commissioner of Assam note the relocation of 400 Gorkha soldiers from Golaghat and 200 from Silchar, followed by further transfers from other parts of Assam in 1891. During the Anglo-Manipur War of 1891, the British deployed the 42nd, 43rd and 44th Gurkha Rifles in the campaign against Manipur. Among those associated with the conflict was Niranjan Singh Chhetri a former British soldier who later became a companion and bodyguard of Bir Tikendrajit. He was executed by the British inside the palace in 1891 for participating in the war against them. He is regarded by many as the first Nepali or Gorkha martyr in India and is remembered as one of the unsung figures of the Anglo-Manipur War. Maharaja Chandrakriti's reign also witnessed continued Gorkha migration into Manipur. During his regime, Nepali labourers and coolies are believed to have migrated into Manipur during to assist in the construction and repair of the Imphal-Mao Road, at a time when the kingdom suffered from a shortage of manpower after the Burmese invasions. According to some accounts, the first Nepali settlement in Manipur emerged at Koirengei, about 9 km north of Imphal, around 1885. However, some scholars dispute this claim, arguing that the mere presence of Gurkhas near military cantonments does not constitute evidence of permanent settlement. Temple records instead associate the area with a retired officer named Anand, after whom "Anandgram" was reportedly named in 1945.

In the early 20th century, Gorkhas formed a substantial component of the Assam Military Police across the northeast. During the First World War, the 2nd Gorkha Rifles stationed at Imphal were replaced in 1915 by the Darang Military Police, which was reorganised as the 4th Assam Rifles in 1917, with Gorkhas comprising the majority of its personnel.

The Gurkha soldiers maintained close relations with the already-settled Gorkha population around Imphal and gradually acquired land in the region. Many Gorkha soldiers settled permanently in Manipur after retirement, and the British administration allotted land to them in areas including Thangmeiband, Eroisemba, Chingmeirong, Mantripukhri, New Checkon, Kangpokpi, Pangei, Kanglatombi and Torbung. They initially engaged in cattle rearing and grazing before later shifting to cultivation through forest clearance. Captain Tintai Lama is remembered as one of the earliest settlers in the Koirengei area before later moving to Chingmeirong, where some of his descendants are believed to remain settled.

In 1899, soldiers of the 44th Gurkha Rifles, including Subedar Gopal Singh Chhetri, Subedar Ran Singh Chhetri, Major Jit Bahadur Limbu and Durlabh Singh Chhetri, were reportedly settled by the British in Kanglatombi, Koirengei, Mantripukhri and Pangei. Areas such as Maram in present-day Senapati district also had Nepali populations by 1894. A poet named Tulachand Ale, who lived there, wrote Manipurko Sawai, regarded among the earliest printed works connected with Manipuri literary history. From the early 20th century, settled Gorkha communities increasingly took up cattle rearing and agriculture in the Kanglatombi-Kangpokpi region. After 1945, former personnel of Subhas Chandra Bose's Indian National Army also settled in Manipur. During the period of military rule in Myanmar, Indian-origin communities, including Nepalis of Myanmar, faced restrictive laws, limited civil rights and periodic political instability. As a result, sections of the Nepali population migrated from Myanmar into India. Some entered through the border town of Moreh in present-day Tengnoupal district of Manipur, while others from nearby Tamu in the Sagaing Region moved further into India through Imphal and Kangpokpi. A portion of these migrants later settled permanently in Manipur. In 1990, the Bhutanese government expelled Nepalis, known as Lhotshampas, following protests against state policies including the Driglam Namzha code of conduct. Around 100,000 Lhotshampas left Bhutan, with many taking refuge in camps in Nepal while others dispersed to regions such as Darjeeling and Sikkim in India. Contemporary estimates suggested that between 30,000 and 50,000 displaced persons settled across different parts of India.

Migration from Nepal and Bhutan into Manipur had already been noted prior to 1958, particularly in the Kangpokpi region, where concerns regarding settlement and land ownership were periodically raised before the Manipur administration. By 1980, official verification records reportedly identified a large proportion of suspected foreign settlers in the state as originating from Nepal and Bhutan.

== Distribution ==
As per the 2011 census, tehsils with the largest proportion of Nepalis are Sadar Hills West (33.0%), Saitu-Gamphazol (9.54%), and Lamshang (10.85%). Districts with the largest Nepali population are Senapati - 39,039 (8.15%), Imphal West - 10,391 (2.01%) and Imphal East - 6,903 (1.51%). In the northern hills, they are in many settlements developed in areas suitable for cultivation and grazing, including Charhazare–Motbung, Koubru Leikha, Pashupati, Santolabari–Prasain, Kalapahar, Toribari IT Road, Irang, Taphou Nepali, Maram Khunou, Lairouching and Maram. In the Imphal valley, Nepali communities are found in Mantripukhri–Koirengei in the urban area, as well as in Pangei, Sagolmang, Aikul and Serou.

In recent decades, sections of the Nepali population have gradually shifted from interior settlements in the Kangpokpi and Saikul areas towards more concentrated settlements such as Kanglatongbi, Charhazare and Kalapahar. Migration outside Manipur has also continued, particularly among families associated with government service and security forces, many of whom settled in regions such as Siliguri and Darjeeling in West Bengal. There is also a settlement of Nepalis in Moreh.

== Contribution and Status ==
As the Gorkha families settled permanently in Manipur (as they had a strong background in cattle grazing, terrace farming and hillside cultivation), they expanded their agricultural activities and cultivated vegetables, maize and seasonal crops, contributing to local markets and rural economies. Their cultivation of sloped and previously underused land supported agricultural production and food availability in several parts of the state. Through gradual adaptation to local conditions, the settled communities became integrated into the agrarian economy of Manipur. The Nepali community has also contributed to dairy farming in Manipur. Although official statistics on community-based dairy production are limited, studies indicate that the state has long depended on small-scale dairy producers to meet local milk requirements. In many rural areas, Nepali families were engaged in cattle rearing and milk production, supplying fresh milk to local markets and supporting both rural and urban households.

Education became another important area of contribution during the 20th century, particularly as schools expanded into remote and underserved regions of Manipur. Improved access to education encouraged many Nepali families to enter teaching, administration and other service-oriented professions. Nepali teachers served in rural schools across the state and contributed to the development of local educational institutions, teaching students from diverse communities and backgrounds. Small businesses operated by Nepali families have contributed to the economic life of Manipur through eateries, tailoring services, retail shops, transport services and mechanical workshops across different districts. Members of the community have also been involved in transport operations connecting remote areas, facilitating the movement of goods and passengers in difficult terrain and weather conditions.

The Nepali community has additionally contributed to agricultural and environmental practices in the state. Many families traditionally relied on organic manure, crop rotation and mixed cultivation methods, which supported soil conservation and reduced erosion in ecologically fragile areas. During the 2023–2026 Manipur conflict, the Nepali Gorkha community submitted a memorandum to national leaders, urging attention to security and humanitarian concerns. During British rule in Manipur, a department for foreigners administered taxes such as foreigner tax, grazing tax, income tax, cattle tax, export tax and trading licence fees. Foreign communities, including mainland Indians, were introduced into the state under the colonial administration, and issues relating to Nepali settlement were periodically addressed by both the British Political Agency and the Manipur Durbar.

The British-era foreigner permit regulations later influenced the enactment of the Manipur Naturalisation Act, 1947, which defined conditions for citizenship and granted the Manipur State Council the authority to revoke such status. During the pre-merger period, migration into the state remained comparatively limited under the permit system.

Following the merger of Manipur with India, the foreigner permit system was abolished in 1950 by the administration of Chief Commissioner Himmat Singh. Subsequent legal changes, including the implementation of the Foreigners (Protected Areas) Act, 1958, facilitated increased migration into Manipur. The Act excluded subjects of Nepal from the definition of 'foreigner', contributing to the growth of the Nepali population in the state during the post-independence period. Later amendments introduced restrictions on Nepali entry in 1978. Rising population concentrations in certain areas also influenced electoral and administrative changes, including the conversion of some constituencies from Scheduled Tribe reserved status to unreserved constituencies. Some Nepali castes and communities in Manipur were recognised as Other Backward Classes (OBC) by the state government in 1994. Under the Panchayati Raj system, the community was also allotted one Zila Parishad and five Gram Panchayats. Members of the Nepali community additionally participated in local political processes and contested elections to the Autonomous District Council during the period from 1973 to 1984. Kishore Thapa was elected as a member of the Kangpokpi Assembly Constituency for three consecutive terms after the constituency was converted from a Scheduled Tribe reserved seat into a general constituency. Badi, Sarki, Gainay, Damai and Kami have been asked to get granted OBC.

The Nepalis are predominantly Hindu. Despite settling in the region since the nineteenth century alongside other the ethnic groups, they have largely retained their distinct cultural identity. Cultural assimilation remained limited, as the community continued to follow its own traditions and customs while maintaining cordial social relations with neighbouring groups through festival greetings and interactions. The Nepalis particularly admire the values and ethics of the Meiteis and Kukis. Cultural exchange was more prominent with the Meiteis, especially in dress patterns and certain social practices, which has been attributed to the shared influence of Hinduism.

At the same time, Nepali youth participated in festivals such as Chavang Kut, the harvest festival of the Kukis, and Christmas celebrations with Kuki friends, though there was little inclination toward adopting the religious practices of other communities, particularly those of the Kukis. Nevertheless, aspects of Kuki social organisation, including community unity, collective participation, flexible ceremonial practices, and the reduced social burden on poorer households during ceremonies, were viewed positively by sections of the Nepalis.

Manipur Gorkha Welfare Union (MGWU), All Manipur Gorkha Students' Union (AMGSU), Bharatiya Gorkha Parisangh Manipur Branch, Nepali Sahitya Parishad Manipur (NSP), Manipureli Kirat Sangh (MKS), All Manipur Gorkha Ex-Serviceman Association (AMGESA) and Nepali Sanskriti Suraksha Parishad Manipur (NSSPM) are recognised to represent the Gorkha community by all Gorkha civil society organisations (CSOs). The Manipur Gorkha Union (MGU), Gorkha Youth of India (GYI) and the All Manipur Gorkha Youth Association (AMGYA) which are newly emerged are not said to be recognised. The Sadar Hills Gorkha Union is an independent body established to look after the welfare and development of the Gorkhas particularly in Sadar Hills.
