= Czarna Góra =

Czarna Góra (Polish for "black mountain") may refer to:

- Czarna Góra, Lesser Poland Voivodeship (south Poland)
- Czarna Góra, Puck County in Pomeranian Voivodeship (north Poland)
- Czarna Góra, Wejherowo County in Pomeranian Voivodeship (north Poland)
- Czarna Góra, Warmian-Masurian Voivodeship (north Poland)
- Czarna Góra Ski Resort, near Sienna, Lower Silesian Voivodeship (south Poland)

== See also ==
- Černá Hora (disambiguation)
- Schwarzenberg (disambiguation)
- Montenegro (disambiguation)
- Black Mountain (disambiguation)
