= Černá Hora =

Černá Hora may refer to:

- Černá Hora (Blansko District), a market town in the Czech Republic
- Černá hora (Bohemian Forest), a peak in the Bohemian Forest
- Černá hora, a peak in the Giant Mountains
- Montenegro, a country called Černá Hora in Czech

== See also ==
- Montenegro (disambiguation)
- Black Mountain (disambiguation)
- Černohorský, a surname
