= Crna Gora (disambiguation) =

Crna Gora is the native name of Montenegro.

Crna Gora (i.e. black mountain in Serbo-Croatian and Macedonian) may also refer to:

- Užička Crna Gora, region in western Serbia
- Skopska Crna Gora, mountainous region on the Serbian–Macedonian border
- Banatska Crna Gora, region in western Romania
- The Serbo-Croatian and Macedonian name for Mali i Zi (region), region in northeastern Albania
- Radio Crna Gora, radio station in Montenegro

== See also ==
- Montenegro (disambiguation)
- Mali i Zi (disambiguation)
- Black Mountain (disambiguation)
