= Svartfjellet =

Svartfjellet may refer to several mountains in Norway:

- Svartfjellet (Kvaløya), a mountain in Hammerfest municipality in Finnmark county
- Svartfjellet (Kvænangen), a mountain in Kvænangen Municipality in Troms county
- Svartfjellet (Loppa), a mountain in Loppa Municipality in Finnmark county
- Svartfjellet (Norddal), a mountain in Fjord Municipality in Møre og Romsdal county
- Svartfjellet (Nordreisa), a mountain in Nordreisa Municipality in Troms county
- Svartfjellet (Rendalen), a mountain in Rendalen Municipality in Innlandet county
- Svartfjellet (Senja), a mountain in Senja Municipality in Troms county
