= Černohorský =

Černohorský (feminine: Černohorská) is a Czech surname. It is a toponymic surname derived from the market town of Černá Hora or from one of several Czech peaks called Černá hora (lit. 'black mountain'). Notable people with the surname include:

- Bohuslav Matěj Černohorský (1684–1742), Czech composer
- Helena Černohorská (born 1970), Czech biathlete
- Jan Černohorský (1898–1976), Czech fencer
- Lukáš Černohorský (born 1984), Czech politician
- Martin Černohorský (1923–2024), Czech physicist
- Walter Oliver Cernohorsky (1927–2014), Czech-New Zealand malacologist
- Zdeněk Černohorský (1910–2001), Czech lichenologist
