= Gurkha regiment =

Gurkha regiment or Gorkha regiment may refer to:

- Brigade of Gurkhas, Nepalese soldiers who serve within the British Army
- Gorkha regiments (India), various infantry regiments in the Indian Army, recruited primarily from Nepal
- 1st Gorkha Rifles (The Malaun Regiment), senior Gorkha infantry regiment of the Indian Army
- 3rd Goorka (The Kumaon) Regiment or 3rd Gorkha Rifles, an Indian Army rifle regiment
- 4th Goorkha Regiment or 4th Gorkha Rifles, an infantry regiment of the Indian Army

== See also ==
- Gurkha (disambiguation), Nepalese soldiers recruited by various armies and forces
- Gurkha Rifles (disambiguation)
- 2nd King Edward VII's Own Gurkha Rifles (The Sirmoor Rifles), former regiment of the British Indian Army
- Royal Gurkha Rifles, a rifle regiment of the British Army
