= 黑山 =

黑山 (Hanyu Pinyin: Hēishān; Japanese: 黒山; rōmaji: Kuroyama; Korean: 흑산; romaja: Heuksan), meaning "black mountain", may refer to:

== Chinese ==
- Chinese name for the country of Montenegro
- Heishan bandits (黑山賊), an offshoot of the Yellow Turban Rebellion during the Eastern Han dynasty

Locations in China

- Heishan County, Jinzhou, Liaoning

Towns

- Heishan, Heilongjiang, in Bayan County
- Heishan Town, Liaoning, in Heishan County

Townships

- Heishan Township, Shaanxi, in Shangzhou District, Shangluo
- Heishan Township, Shandong, in Changdao County

== Korean ==
- Heuksan Island in the Yellow Sea, administratively part of Sinan County, Jeollanam-do, South Korea

== Japanese ==
- Kuroyama Station, Hakushin Line station in Niigata, Niigata Prefecture, Japan

== See also ==
- Black Mountain (disambiguation), for names with a similar meaning in other languages
- Heishan (disambiguation)
