= Heishan =

Heishan (黑山; literally black mountain) may refer to:

- Chinese name for the country of Montenegro
- Heishan bandits (黑山賊), an offshoot of the Yellow Turban Rebellion during the Eastern Han dynasty

Locations in China

- Heishan County, Jinzhou, Liaoning

Towns

- Heishan, Heilongjiang, in Bayan County
- Heishan Town, Liaoning, in Heishan County

Townships

- Heishan Township, Shaanxi, in Shangzhou District, Shangluo
- Heishan Township, Shandong, in Changdao County

== See also ==
- 黑山 (disambiguation)
- Black Mountain (disambiguation)
