= Martin Duberman =

American historian, playwright, and gay rights activist (born 1930)

- Born: Martin Bauml Duberman; August 6, 1930 (age 96); New York City, New York, U.S
- Education: Yale University (BA); Harvard University (MA, PhD)

Martin Bauml Duberman (born August 6, 1930) is an American historian, biographer, playwright, and gay rights activist. Duberman was Professor of History and Distinguished Professor Emeritus at Lehman College in the Bronx, New York City.

== Early life ==
Duberman was born into a Jewish family. His father, born in Ukraine, was initially a manual laborer but later founded a successful clothing business that sold uniforms to the government during World War II. His family used the money to move to Mount Vernon, New York, and send Martin to the Horace Mann School, an elite private prep school. He would later graduate from Yale College and Harvard University.

== Activism ==
In 1968, he signed the "Writers and Editors War Tax Protest" pledge to refuse tax payments in protest against the Vietnam War. He was jailed, as a member, for a sit-in protest on the floor of the US Senate. His numerous essays on "The Black Struggle", "The Crisis of the Universities", "American Foreign Policy", and "Gender and Sexuality" have been collected in two volumes of his essays: The Uncompleted Past and Left Out: The Politics of Exclusion, 1964–1999.

He came out as a gay man in some of the autobiographical reflections in his 1972 book Black Mountain: An Exploration in Community. A founder and keynote speaker of the Gay Academic Union (1973), he later founded and served as first director (1986–1996) of the Center for Lesbian and Gay Studies at the CUNY Graduate School. In 1997 he edited two volumes, "A Queer World" and "Queer Representations" containing selections from the Center's conferences. He was also a member of the founding boards of the National Lesbian and Gay Task Force, Lambda Legal Defense Fund, and Queers for Economic Justice.

== Writing ==
External videos
- Appearances on C-SPAN

He has written more than 25 books on subjects such as James Russell Lowell (a National Book Award finalist in 1966), Charles Francis Adams, Sr. (Bancroft Prize winner in 1961), Black Mountain College in the book Black Mountain: An Exploration in Community, Paul Robeson, the Stonewall riots, Howard Zinn, and the Haymarket affair, The Martin Duberman Reader-2013 and the memoir Cures: A Gay Man's Odyssey, 1991, 2002. His 2007 book The Worlds of Lincoln Kirstein was runner-up for the Pulitzer Prize.

Duberman's play In White America won the Vernon Rice/Drama Desk Award for Best Off-Broadway Production in 1963. Two of his other plays, Visions of Kerouac (about writer Jack Kerouac; Little Brown, 1977) and Mother Earth (about activist Emma Goldman; St. Martins Press, 1991) have received multiple productions. An anthology of his plays, Radical Acts: Collected Political Plays (The New Press, 2008), includes those mentioned, as well as Posing Naked.

Duberman edited (1994–1997) two series (a total of 14 books), "The Lives of Notable Gay Men and Lesbians," and "Issues in Gay and Lesbian Life". He also won three Lambda Awards one for Hold Tight Gently: Michael Callen, Essex Hemphill, and the Battlefield of AIDS in 2015, and two for Hidden from History: Reclaiming the Gay and Lesbian Past, an anthology he co-edited; a special award from the American Academy of Arts and Letters for his "contributions to literature", 1988 winner of the Manhattan Borough President's Gold Medal in Literature, 1989 winner of the NYPL's George Freedley Memorial Award for "best book of the year" for the biography Paul Robeson.

Duberman's numerous other awards include the 1995 Public Service Award from the Association of Lesbian and Gay Lawyers, the 1996 Public Service Award from the Association of Gay and Lesbian Psychiatrists, the 2007 Lifetime Achievement Award from the American Historical Association, the Founding Father award, HGLC, the 2008 Whitehead Award for Lifetime Achievement in Non-Fiction, Bill Whitehead Award, 2009, Distinguished Writing award, The Antioch Review, 2010. In 2012 Amherst College conferred on him an Honorary Degree, Doctor of Humane Letters, the Lambda Literary Award for Nonfiction for Hold Tight Gently, 2014, the American Library Association's Stonewall Honor Book for Non-Fiction, 2015. Duberman received an honorary Doctor of Letters from Columbia University in May 2017. In 2024 he received the Harvard Centennial Medal for his "contributions to society."

Duberman's novel Jews Queers Germans, was published by Seven Stories Press in March 2017. His most recent novel, Luminous Traitor: The Just and Daring Life of Roger Casement, a Biographical Novel, was published by the University of California Press in November 2018. His two most recent books are: Naomi Weisstein: Brain Scientist, Rock Band Leader, Feminist Rebel (Levellers Press, 2020), a collection of essays edited by Duberman, and the critical biography Andrea Dworkin: The Feminist as Revolutionary (The New Press, 2020).

His 2023 memoir Reaching Ninety was shortlisted for the 2024 Lambda Literary Award for Gay Memoir or Biography.

== Selected works ==
- In White America, 1965
- Black Mountain: An Exploration in Community, 1972
- Paul Robeson: A Biography, 1989
- Stonewall, 1993
- Left Out: A Political Journey, 1999
- Haymarket: A Novel, 2004
- The Worlds of Lincoln Kirstein, 2007
- Radical Acts: Collected Political Plays, The New Press, 2008
- Howard Zinn: A Life on the Left, 2012
- Hold Tight Gently: Michael Callen, Essex Hemphill, and the Battlefield of AIDS, New Press, 2014
- Jews Queers Germans, Seven Stories Press, 2017
- Has the Gay Movement Failed?, 2018
- Luminous Traitor: The Just and Daring Life of Roger Casement, a Biographical Novel, University of California Press, 2018
- Naomi Weisstein: Brain Scientist, Rock Band Leader, Feminist Rebel, Levellers Press, 2020
- Andrea Dworkin: The Feminist as Revolutionary, The New Press, 2020
- Reaching Ninety, Chicago Review Press, 2023

== See also ==
- LGBTQ culture in New York City
- List of LGBTQ people from New York City
- NYC Pride March
