= Christmas Card Lane =

Holiday light display in San Diego, California

Coordinates: 32.96825°N 117.129770°W

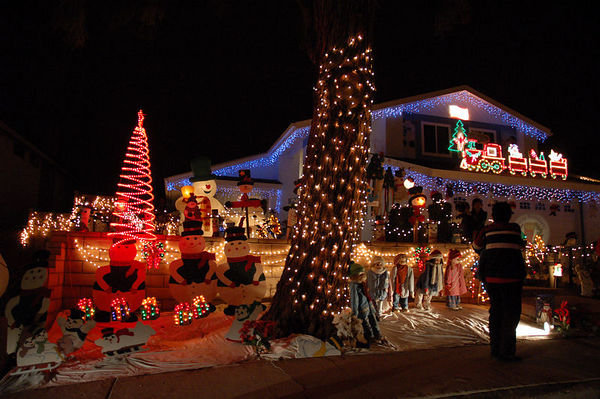
Typical Christmas Card Lane display

Christmas Card Lane is a holiday light display in San Diego, California, in the community of Rancho Peñasquitos. It is one of the most famous holiday displays in San Diego. Residents erect giant plywood greetings in their front yards depicting cartoon characters, religious images, or Christmas themes.

== History ==
Christmas Card Lane was started in 1982 by resident Alana Hastings as a way to share the Christmas spirit of the tight-knit community with others in the city. Residents began to call local radio stations to advertise Christmas Card Lane. Initially 15 families on Ellingham Street participated. Now there are about 200, spreading onto Oviedo and Renato streets.

Displays range from Mickey Mouse representing the noted "Christmas Carol" story, to testing out the new naughty-or-nice software. Some displays are so elaborate that residents keep parts up all year.

The displays start going up right after Thanksgiving, with most in place by the second week of December and staying there through New Year's. Some displays require weeks of preparation.
