= Irvin Kahn =

American real estate developer (1916–1973)

Irvin J. Kahn
- Born: January 31, 1916; Pennsylvania, United States
- Died: September 10, 1973 (aged 57)
- Occupation(s): Attorney; Real estate developer
- Spouse: Eleanor Barlin Kahn
- Children: Samuel Kahn

Irvin J. Kahn (1916–1973) was an American attorney and real estate developer who played a major role in the expansion of the city of San Diego in the 1950s, 1960s, and 1970s. He received frequent press coverage for his ongoing role in developing Clairemont, University City and Rancho Peñasquitos. He is also notable for having built one of the first skyscrapers in downtown San Diego.

== Early life ==
Born in 1916, Kahn was the son of Abraham J. Kahn, a Russian Jewish immigrant who settled in San Diego in 1922. Abraham operated a bootlegging business during prohibition, which he transitioned into a successful liquor import business after the end of prohibition. Irvin had two younger brothers – Julius and Yale.

== Career ==
Observing his father's frequent run-ins with the courts due to his bootlegging past, Irvin was inspired to pursue a career as a criminal defense attorney. Irvin Kahn began his professional career as a defense attorney representing a number of high-profile clients, including several local labor unions. He also worked as a lobbyist on city affairs, representing the Veterans Cab Company in their bid to increase the number of taxi permits issued by the City of San Diego. In 1952, Kahn, along with KFMB-TV founder Jack O. Gross, became one of the owners of the San Diego Padres, then a minor-league team in the Pacific Coast League. (The sale was delayed by several years due to concerns over his father's bookmaking activities and brother Yale's professional gambling.) Though he had been opportunistically acquiring land throughout the 1940s, Kahn's first major real estate development project was a 312 unit apartment complex in Point Loma, started in 1951 as part of a 9,000 unit military housing initiative in San Diego.

=== Development projects ===
Beginning in the mid-1950s, Irvin Kahn began to receive frequent press coverage due to his high-profile development activities. Between 1952 and his death in 1973, Kahn initiated a series of large and small development projects that by some estimates involved 25% of all developable land in the city of San Diego. Kahn's first major project was the Clairemont Subdivision. The project was initiated by Carlos Tavares and Lou Burgener in 1950, but Kahn took a leadership role in the venture in 1955. He was responsible for the development of the Clairemont Shopping Center as well as hundreds of new housing units built in the late 1950s. He also launched development projects in Chula Vista and La Mesa during that time.

In the early 1960s, as the Clairemont subdivision was reaching completion, Kahn turned his attention to nearby University City. He partnered with Carlos Tavares and brought in developer Louis Lesser as a minority partner to develop the approximately 4,400 acres.

In 1962, Kahn acquired the approximately 14,000 acre Rancho Peñasquitos with financing from Sixty Trust, the employee pension fund of airplane manufacturer Textron, Inc. (Rancho Peñasquitos was one of only a handful of large ranches still operating within the city limits.) Kahn planned to develop the land into a massive $1 billion housing development with a golf course, apartments, single-family tract homes, retirement housing, and shopping centers. Kahn's broad vision set in motion a series of additional planning processes that created lengthy delays for the project, with the San Diego City Planning Commission voting to delay consideration of Kahn's subdivision plan for several years until a master plan could be developed for the area. By 1965 the project was in danger of foreclosure and required additional financing. Kahn recruited Louis Lessor's help in obtaining financing from the Teamsters Pension Fund through Lessor's relationship with Morris Shenker, who was the gatekeeper for the Pension Fund's investments. Shenker arrange a $10M mortgage from the Mercantile Trust Company National Association and an additional $3.5M in financing from the Teamsters Pension Fund. In exchange, the Teamsters Pension Fund received a first deed of trust on Rancho Peñasquitos, and a 20% share in the Rancho Peñasquitos development corporation.

By the early 1970s, additional capital was needed to finance the large-scale development that was expected to take place in the 1970s – Kahn's plan involved creating homes for more than 150,000 people. Though Kahn was able to refinance the project, his sudden death in 1973 put those plans in jeopardy. The vision for Rancho Peñasquitos shifted significantly after Kahn's death, with larger single-family homes taking the place of the apartment complexes and small-lot tract housing that Kahn had envisioned. Today Rancho Peñasquitos is home to roughly 55,000 residents, little more than a third of the size of the community originally envisioned.

=== Bowling alleys and other projects ===
In addition to Clairemont, University City, and Rancho Peñasquitos, Kahn was involved in a number of notable projects in the history of the City of San Diego. In the late 1950s, he participated in smaller development projects in Chula Vista and La Mesa and was a vocal advocate for the "Shattuck Plan" to convert Horton Plaza to a convention hall. In 1960 he was part of a group of developers who pooled together a $4M loan for low income housing in Mexico. Also in the early 1960s, Kahn erected two 'skyscrapers' in Centre City. At the time they were two of the tallest buildings in San Diego, surpassed only by the El Cortez hotel (1927) and the Executive Complex (1963). Kahn built a bowling alley and nightclub in El Cajon with Louis Lesser, and eventually expanded his bowling holdings to include 11 alleys. He also developed two resort hotel properties on Shelter Island, the first of their kind on the small strip of reclaimed land adjacent to the canneries of Point Loma, and was Chairman & CEO of the Continental Connector Corporation, which held a controlling interest in the iconic Dunes Hotel, Casino & Country Club. In addition to San Diego, Kahn participated in real estate development activities in San Francisco, Arizona & Nevada.

== Teamsters pension fund controversy ==
Beginning in the mid-1960s, Kahn financed his increasingly ambitious development projects with loans from the International Brotherhood of Teamsters' Central States, Southeast and Southwest Areas Pension Fund, which brought him under scrutiny from the FBI and IRS. Newspapers after his death reported that an IRS trailer had been semi-permanently parked outside his company headquarters, reviewing the accounting books from Kahn's numerous businesses. (Despite the thorough review, the IRS effort turned up little incriminating information aside from Kahn's tendency to wait until the last minute to pay bills.) Similarly, the FBI monitored Kahn's activities for several years and raided a "high-stakes gambling ring" at his Murrieta Hot Springs resort. (The raid 'nabbed' dozens of elderly female spa guests who had been playing mah-jong and bridge, an outcome that was covered humorously in the contemporary press.)

== Personal life and death ==
Kahn was married to Eleanor Barlin (1925–2011); they had one son, Samuel “Sandy” Kahn. Kahn and his wife were active in San Diego Jewish philanthropy. Kahn died suddenly in September 1973 from a heart attack while watching the Ali-Norton fight on closed circuit television. At the time of his death, he owed nearly $180 million to the Teamsters Pension Fund (nearly $1 billion in 2015 dollars), making the Irvin Kahn Organization & subsidiaries the fund's largest investment. Kahn's 19-year-old son Samuel, then a college freshman, took over the companies and the settlement of the estate, divesting the Kahn family companies from their association with the Teamsters and refocusing on less risky real estate development activities.
