= Black Peak =

Black Peak may refer to the following mountains:

- Black Peak (Vitosha), in the Vitosha Massif, Bulgaria
- Black Peak (Šar Mountains), in the Šar Mountains, Kosovo
- Black Peak (Pohorje), in the Pohorje mountains, Slovenia
- Black Peak (Alaska), a volcano in Alaska, US
- Black Peak (Chigmit Mountains), in Alaska, US
- Black Peak (New Zealand), Otago Region, New Zealand
- Black Peak (Washington), in the Cascade Range, Washington State, US
- Kalanag, also known as Black Peak, in the Himalayas
- Piz Nair, Black Peak in Romansh, a mountain of the Albula Alps in Switzerland
