= Mali i Zi =

Mali i Zi (i.e. black mountain in Albanian) may refer to:

- Malzi, an Albanian tribe and a region in Albania
- The Albanian name for Montenegro, a country in Europe
- The Albanian name for Skopska Crna Gora, a mountain and a region in the Balkans

== See also ==
- Montenegro (disambiguation)
- Crna Gora (disambiguation)
- Black Mountain (disambiguation)
