= Gurkha Rifles =

Gurkha Rifles may refer to several different regiments of Gurkhas:

== Regiments of the British Indian Army ==
- 1st Gorkha Rifles (The Malaun Regiment)
- 2nd King Edward VII's Own Gurkha Rifles (The Sirmoor Rifles)
- 3rd Queen Alexandra's Own Gurkha Rifles
- 4th Prince of Wales's Own Gurkha Rifles
- 5th Gorkha Rifles (Frontier Force)
- 6th Queen Elizabeth's Own Gurkha Rifles
- 7th Duke of Edinburgh's Own Gurkha Rifles
- 10th Princess Mary's Own Gurkha Rifles
- 11th Gurkha Rifles
- 14th Gurkha Rifles
- 25th Gurkha Rifles
- 26th Gurkha Rifles
- 29th Gurkha Rifles
- 38th Gurkha Rifles
- 42nd Gurkha Rifles
- 44th Gurkha Rifles
- 56th Gurkha Rifles
- 710th Gurkha Rifles

== Regiments of the Indian Army ==
- 1st Gorkha Rifles (The Malaun Regiment)
- 3rd Gorkha Rifles
- 4th Gorkha Rifles
- 5th Gorkha Rifles (Frontier Force)
- 8th Gorkha Rifles
- 9th Gorkha Rifles
- 11th Gorkha Rifles

== See also ==
- Gurkha (disambiguation)
- Gurkha Rifles (disambiguation)
