= Rancho Peñasquitos, San Diego =

- Community of San Diego
- Rancho Peñasquitos
- Nicknames: "PQ", Rancho Pinoy-quitos
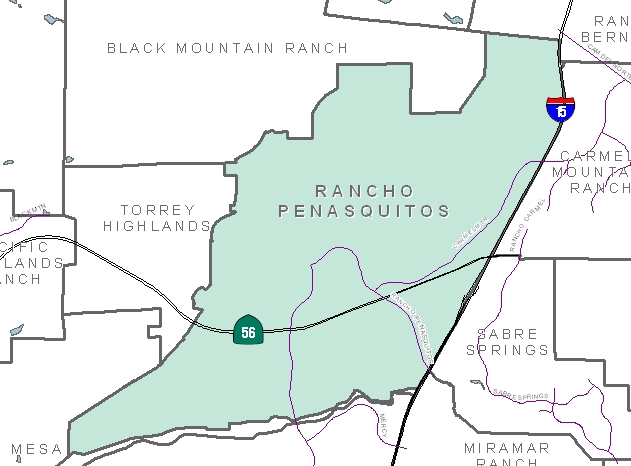
- Rancho Peñasquitos and neighborhood boundaries

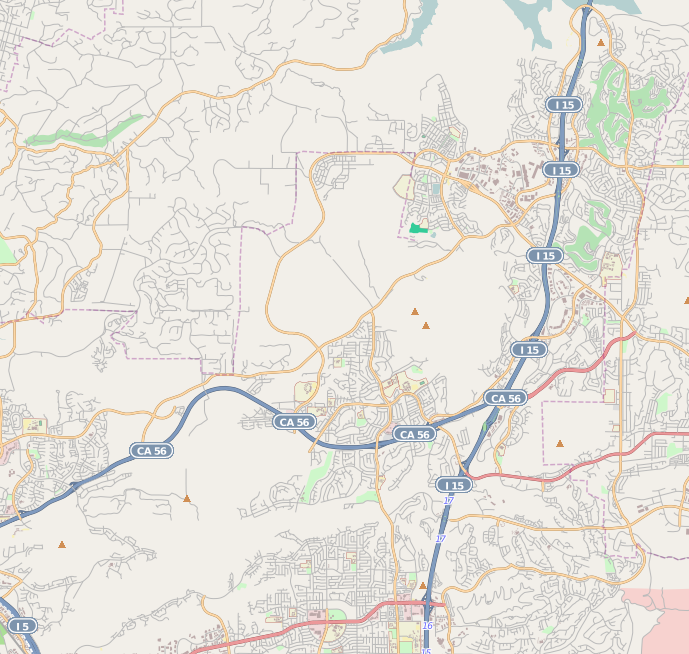
- Location within Northeastern San Diego Rancho Peñasquitos (San Diego County, California)
- Coordinates: 32°57′33.84″N 117°06′56.07″W
- Country: United States
- State: California
- County: San Diego
- City: San Diego
- Website: Official website

Rancho Peñasquitos is a suburban community in northeastern San Diego, California. It is named after the first Mexican land grant in San Diego County, Rancho Santa Maria de Los Peñasquitos. (Peñasquitos is Spanish for "little cliffs".) The community abuts Los Peñasquitos Canyon Preserve, an open space preserve that offers hiking, biking, and equestrian trails. The community is commonly abbreviated "PQ."

The population of Rancho Peñasquitos is approximately 60,000. it is located in ZIP Code 92129. The telephone area codes are 619 and 858.

== Geography ==
Rancho Peñasquitos is roughly bounded:

- On the north by Black Mountain Ranch and Rancho Bernardo
- On the south by Los Peñasquitos Canyon Preserve and Mira Mesa
- On the east by Carmel Mountain Ranch and Sabre Springs
- On the west by Torrey Highlands and Del Mar Mesa.

The highest point in the community is Black Mountain, which rises to an elevation of 1,500 feet (460 m).

== History ==
Native American Kumeyaay history within the area has been documented to 7,000 years ago. The area was home to a Kumeyaay settlement which was known to them as 'Awil Nyawa'. Remains of the prehistoric culture can still be found.

Gradually ethnic Spanish colonists moved into the area, following the establishment of missions and other settlements along the coast. Rancho de los Peñasquitos was the first rancho, the Rancho Santa Maria de Los Peñasquitos, within the boundaries of present-day San Diego County. In 1823, one league (4,243 acres; 17 km^{2}) was awarded to Captain Francisco María Ruiz, a Commandant of the Presidio of San Diego. This one league was at the eastern part of the Los Peñasquitos Canyon and extended into Sabre Springs and up to Rancho Bernardo.

It was a way station on the Wagon road from San Diego to Warner's Ranch. From 1857 to 1860, it was a station on that road for the San Antonio-San Diego Mail Line between San Diego and Vallecito via San Pasqual, Santa Ysabel Asistencia, Warner's, and Rancho Valle de San Felipe. The ranch operated until 1962, when real estate developer Irvin Kahn acquired the 14,000- acre parcel with the intent of building a 150,000-resident planned community.

In 1964, San Diego annexed most of the area, building out from Irvin Kahn's community.

== Demographics ==
=== 2010 census ===
As of the census of 2010, there were 51,536 people, 17,009 households, and 14,093 families residing in the community. The racial makeup of the town was 58.2% White, 2.6% African American, 0.3% Native American, 30.0% Asian, 2.7.% from other races, and 6.0% from two or more races. Hispanic or Latino of any race were 9.8% of the population.

There were 17,009 households, of which 43.6% had children under the age of 18 living with them, 67.8% were married couples living together, 10.7% had a female householder with no husband present, 4.3% had a male householder with no wife present, and 17.1% were non-families. Of all households 2.4% were made up of individuals, and 3.3% had someone living alone who was 65 years of age or older. The average household size was 3.03 and the average family size was 3.30.

The median age in the town was 38 years. 26.8% of residents were under the age of 18; 65.3% were between the ages of 18 and 64; and 7.9% were 65 years of age or older. The gender makeup of the community was 50.5% female and 49.5% male.

== Transportation ==
Rancho Peñasquitos is a car-dependent area, according to WalkScore.com. Black Mountain Road is the main north–south artery, and Carmel Mountain Road/Rancho Peñasquitos Boulevard is the main east–west artery. State Route 56 traverses east–west through the central portion of the community. Interstate 15 forms an eastern boundary of Rancho Peñasquitos, with Carmel Mountain Ranch lying on the far side.

The San Diego Metropolitan Transit System (MTS) operates a bus through the area, #20, with a stop on Carmel Mountain Road. The MTS Rapid #235 bus operates from the Sabre Springs/Peñasquitos Transit Station, arriving in downtown San Diego after only 5 stops.

== Community events ==
- Mt. Carmel Tournament of Bands is an annual high school marching band parade and field show competition, fully volunteer-run by the Mt Carmel Music Foundation. It has been held in late October every year since 1976. It is the most widely attended parade and field competition in San Diego, where more than 30 bands from San Diego county and the Los Angeles metropolitan area perform.
- The Fiesta de Los Penasquitos and Parade is on the first weekend in May, held since 1995. PQ residents and community organizations partner to celebrate the city with a 5K Fun Run, Street Fair, and Parade (as of 2015). a) The annual PQ5K Fun Run (since 2007) is a free event sponsored by the Peñasquitos Stake of the Church of Jesus Christ of Latter-day Saints in partnership with the Peñasquitos Town Council. The event begins the Saturday before the Fiesta de los Peñasquitos. b) In 2015, the Rancho Peñasquitos Town Council held its Inaugural Parade for the fiesta. The event is managed by Rancho Peñasquitos Town Council, and is supported by a City of San Diego Arts & Culture Grant. http://www.rpcouncil.com/
- The Rancho Peñasquitos Recreation Council sponsors a fireworks show for July 4 at Westview High School; it is usually held on July 3. Funding was not available in 2019 for a fireworks show.
- Christmas Card Lane, since 1982 families on several local streets have installed increasingly elaborate displays and lights for the season. In addition, some groups rent vehicles for touring and singing Christmas carols.

== Emergency services ==
=== Fire service ===
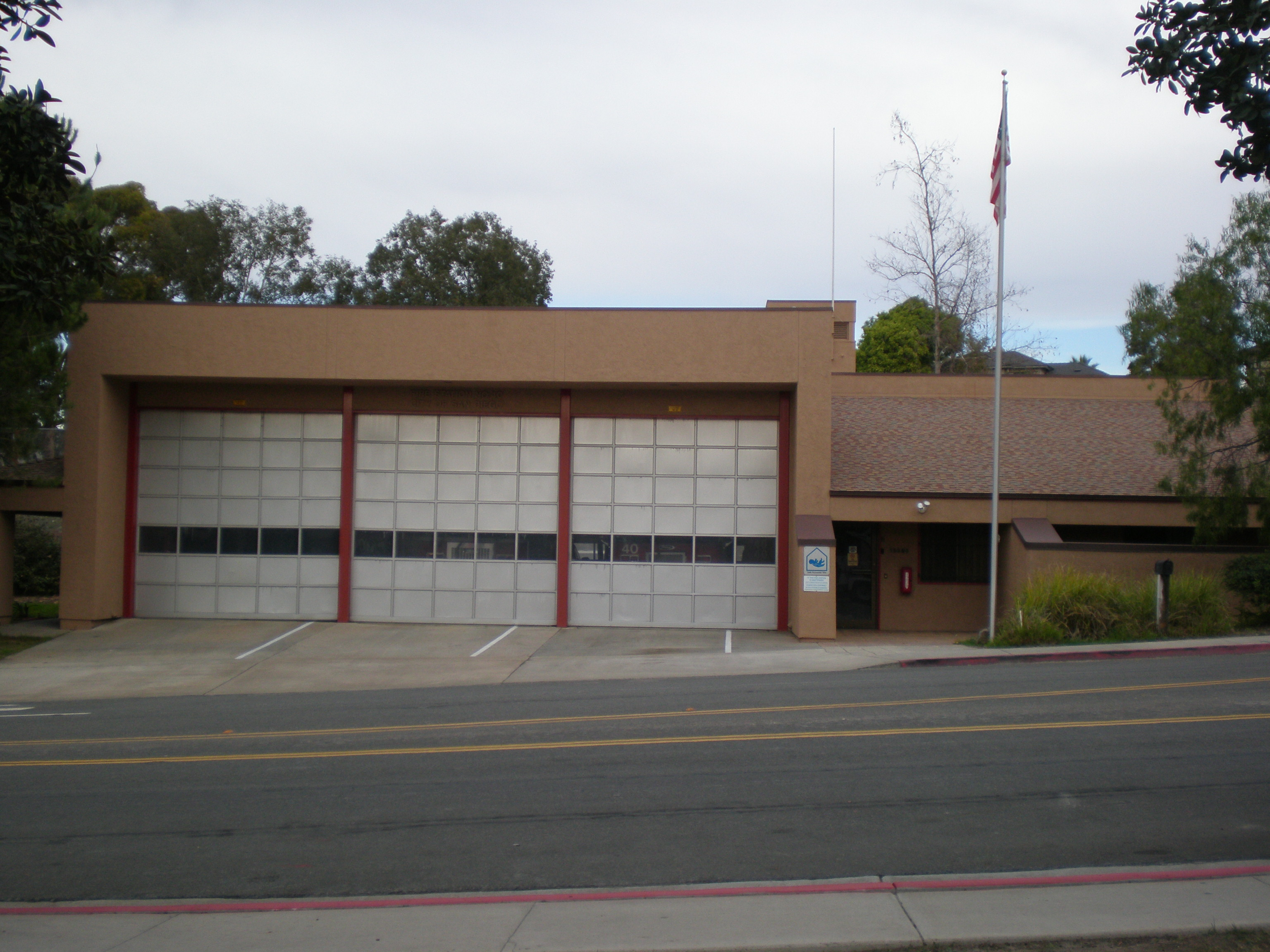
SDFD Fire Station 40

Fire protection and emergency medical services are provided by the San Diego Fire-Rescue Department fire station #40 at 13393 Salmon River Road in the area of Rancho Peñasquitos. This station is in the 7th Battalion.

=== Police service ===
The San Diego Police Department operates from a station on 13396 Salmon River Road, serving the neighborhood.

== Parks ==
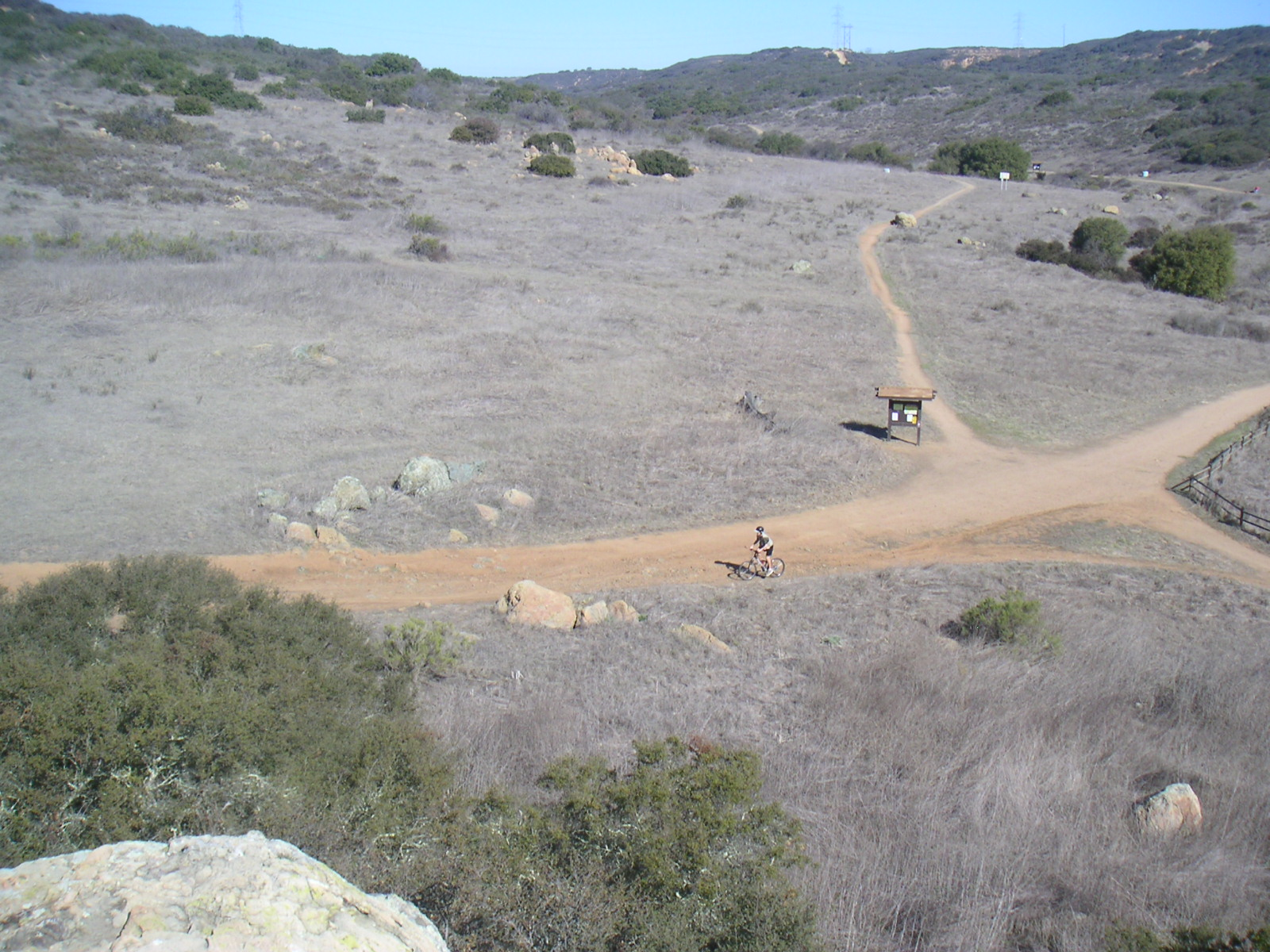
A bicyclist enjoys Los Peñasquitos Canyon Preserve near the waterfall.

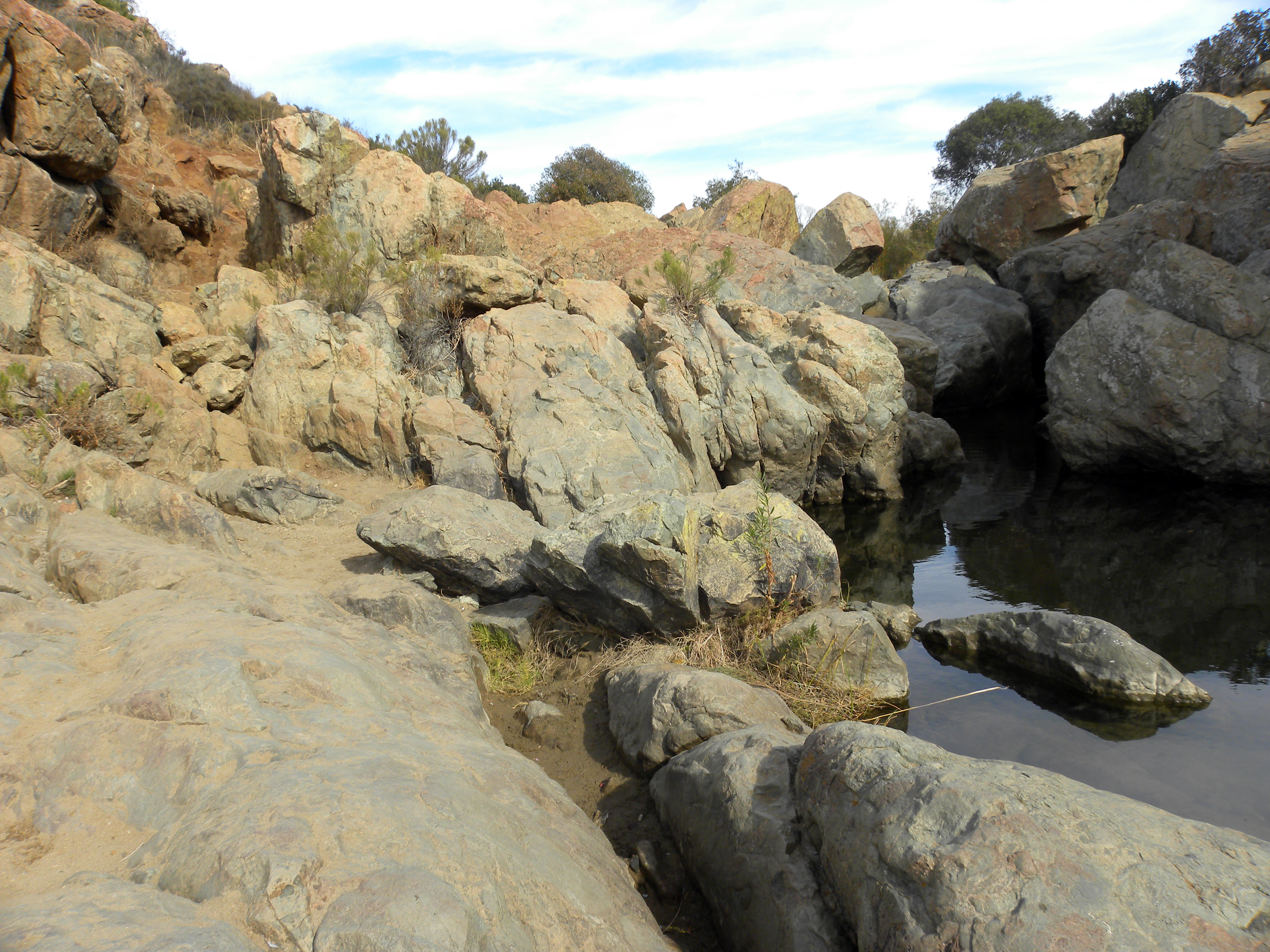
Waterfall in Los Peñasquitos Canyon Preserve.

- PQ Skate Park
- Canyonside Recreation Center
- Hilltop Recreation Center
- Peñasquitos Creek Park
- Rolling Hills Park
- Black Mountain Open Space Park
- Los Peñasquitos Canyon Preserve
- Twin Trails Neighborhood Park

== Schools ==
Rancho Peñasquitos is in the Poway Unified School District.

=== High schools ===
- Mt. Carmel High School
- Westview High School

=== Middle schools ===
- Black Mountain Middle School
- Mesa Verde Middle School

=== Elementary schools ===
- Adobe Bluffs Elementary School
- Canyon View Elementary School
- Deer Canyon Elementary School
- Los Peñasquitos Elementary School
- Park Village Elementary School
- Rolling Hills Elementary School
- Sundance Elementary School
- Sunset Hills Elementary School

== Churches ==
- St. Timothy's Episcopal Church
- Our Lady of Mt. Carmel Parish
- The Church of Jesus Christ of Latter-day Saints
- The New Hope Church of Penasquitos
- Penasquitos Lutheran Church

== In popular culture ==
The private home filming location of the 2007 film Paranormal Activity is in Rancho Peñasquitos.

== Notable people ==
- Arianna Afsar, actress
- Billy Beane, Major League Baseball player
- Eric Chavez, Major League Baseball star
- John T. Earnest, perpetrator of the Poway synagogue shooting
- James Holmes, perpetrator of the 2012 Aurora, Colorado, shooting
- Troy Johnson, writer, food critic, and TV personality
- Adam Lambert, singer and actor
- Liza del Mundo, voice actress
- Eric Munson, Major League Baseball star
- Kelly Marie Tran, actress
- Usha Vance, lawyer, wife of JD Vance
