= Black Peak (Chigmit Mountains) =

Mountain in Alaska, United States

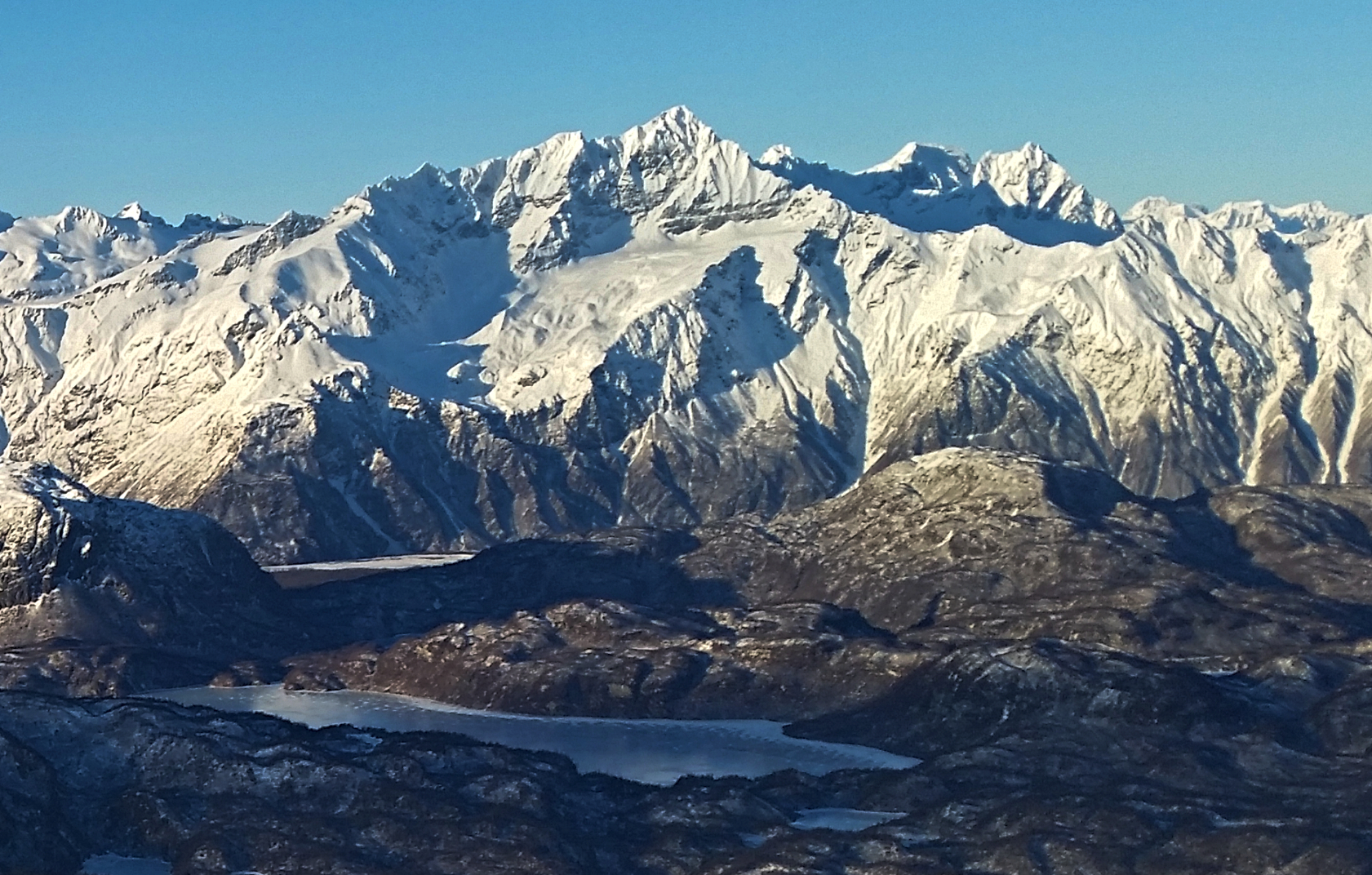
- Black Peak, southeast aspect Aerial view in winter

Highest point
- Elevation: 6,385 ft (1,946 m)
- Prominence: 3,386 ft (1,032 m)
- Parent peak: Double Peak (6,818 ft)
- Isolation: 10 mi (16 km)
- Coordinates: 60°51′12″N 152°25′27″W

Geography
- Location within Alaska
- Location: Lake Clark National Park; Kenai Peninsula Borough; Alaska, United States
- Parent range: Chigmit Mountains; Aleutian Range
- Topo map: USGS Kenai D-7

Climbing
- Easiest route: Mountaineering

Black Peak is a prominent 6,385 ft-high (1,946 m) glaciated mountain summit located in Lake Clark National Park and Preserve, in the Chigmit Mountains of the Aleutian Range, in the US state of Alaska. It is the second-highest non-volcanic peak in the Chigmit Mountains, and fourth-highest overall. The mountain is situated 22 mi (35 km) west of Cook Inlet, 90 mi (145 km) west-southwest of Anchorage, and 10.2 mi (16 km) northeast of Double Peak, which is the nearest higher peak. Although modest in elevation, relief is significant since the mountain rises up 6,200 ft (1,900 m) from North Fork Big River in about two miles. The mountain's descriptive name was published in 1912 by the United States Coast and Geodetic Survey. The months May through June offer the most favorable weather for viewing or climbing the peak.

== Climate ==
Based on the Köppen climate classification, Black Peak is located in a subarctic climate zone, with long, cold, snowy winters, and cool summers. Winter temperatures can drop below −20 °C with wind chill factors below −30 °C. Precipitation runoff from the mountain and meltwater from its glaciers drains into Cook Inlet via Big River.

== See also ==
- List of the most prominent summits of the United States
- List of mountain peaks of Alaska
- Geography of Alaska
