= Black Mountain Open Space Park =

Open space park and nature area in San Diego, CA, USA

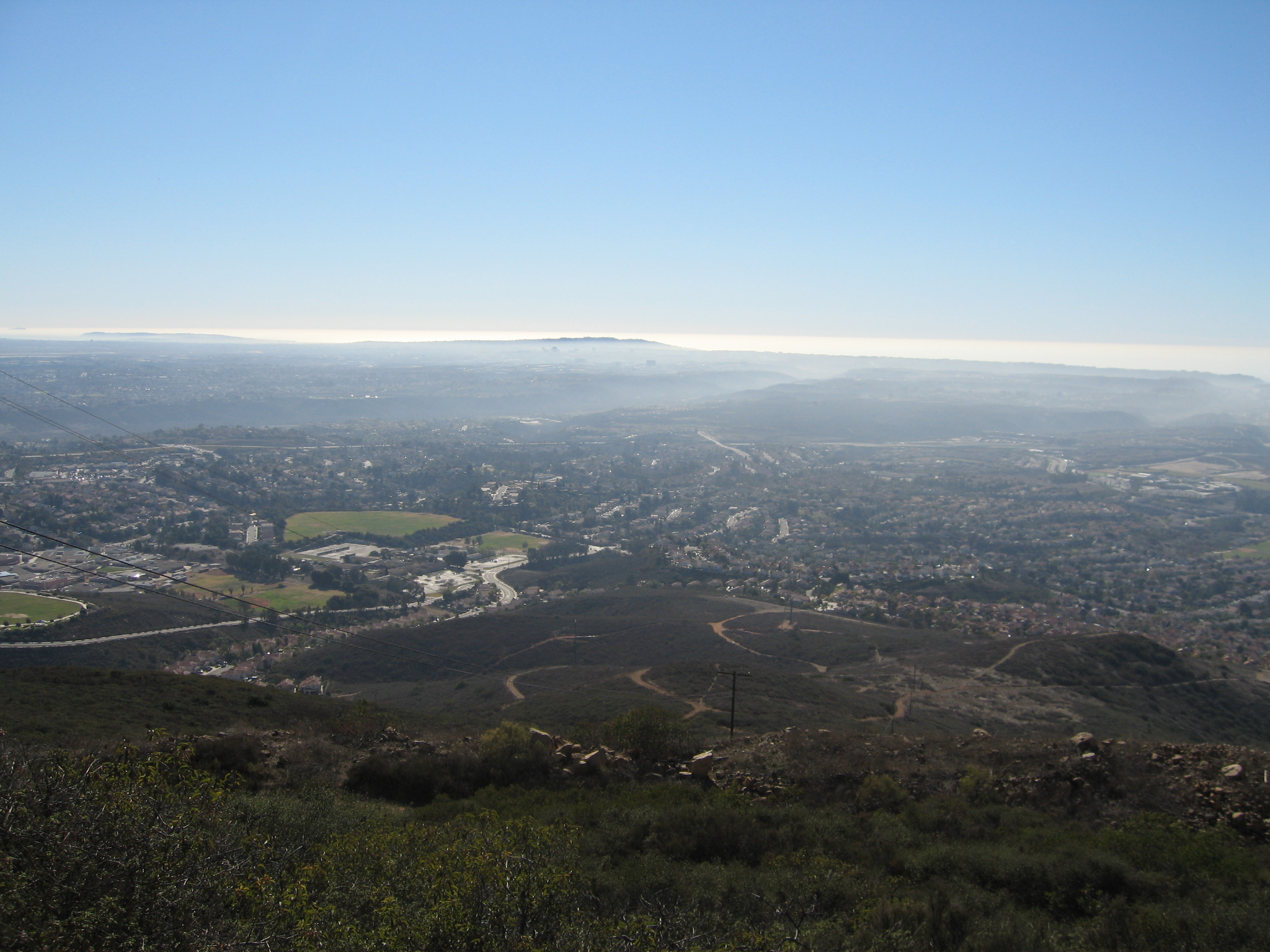
- View from the top of Black Mountain overlooking the city of San Diego
- Interactive map of Black Mountain Open Space Park
- Coordinates: 32°58′54″N 117°06′59″W
- Area: 2,352 acres (952 ha)
- Operator: San Diego Park and Recreation Department

Black Mountain Open Space Park is a city park in the northern suburbs of San Diego, California.

== Description ==
The park covers 2,352 acres (9.52 km^{2}) in the Black Mountain Ranch and Rancho Peñasquitos area of northern San Diego. The park offers numerous trails for hiking and biking, and boasts a variety of native animal and plant species.

=== Plant species ===
Native plant species preserved in Black Mountain Open Space Park include both chaparral and coastal sage scrub. Native to the east and north sides of the mountain, the chaparral community includes manzanita, laurel sumac, lemonade berry, coffee berry, chamise, toyon, and California lilac. The coastal sage scrub, native to the south and west faces of the mountain, include Californian white sage and Californian black sage, California sagebrush, California buckwheat, and California sunflower.

=== Animal species ===
The Black Mountain Open Space Park is home to a wide variety of animal species. Mammals include mule deer, bobcat, desert woodrat, and Pacific kangaroo rat, and many others. Among the more than 80 birds species that can be found in the park, rare birds like the California gnatcatcher, rufous-crowned sparrow, and northern harrier reside in the area. Reptiles include the red diamond rattlesnake and amphibians include the Pacific chorus frog and slender salamander.

== Black Mountain ==
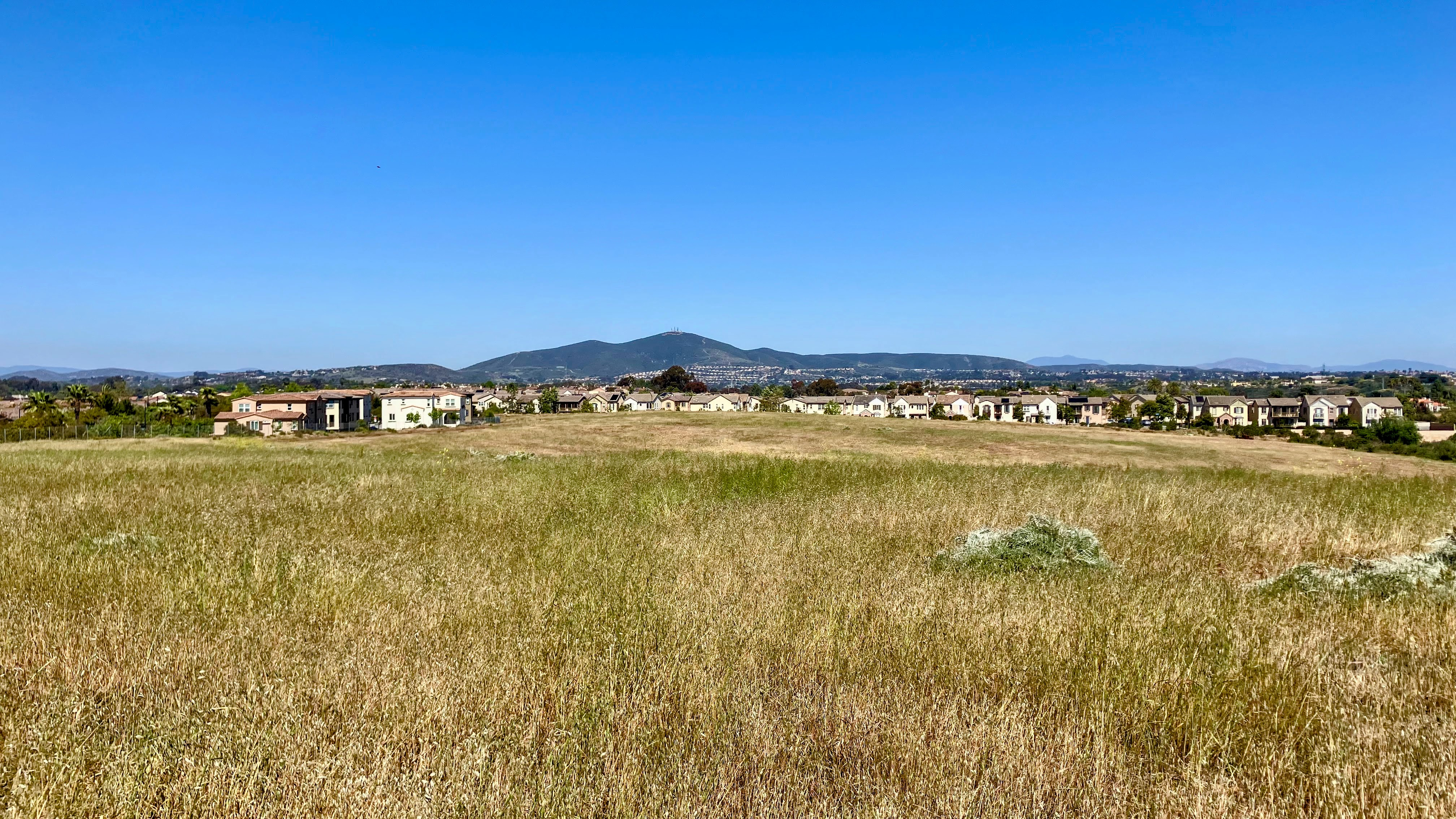
View of Black Mountain from the west (Pacific Highlands Ranch)

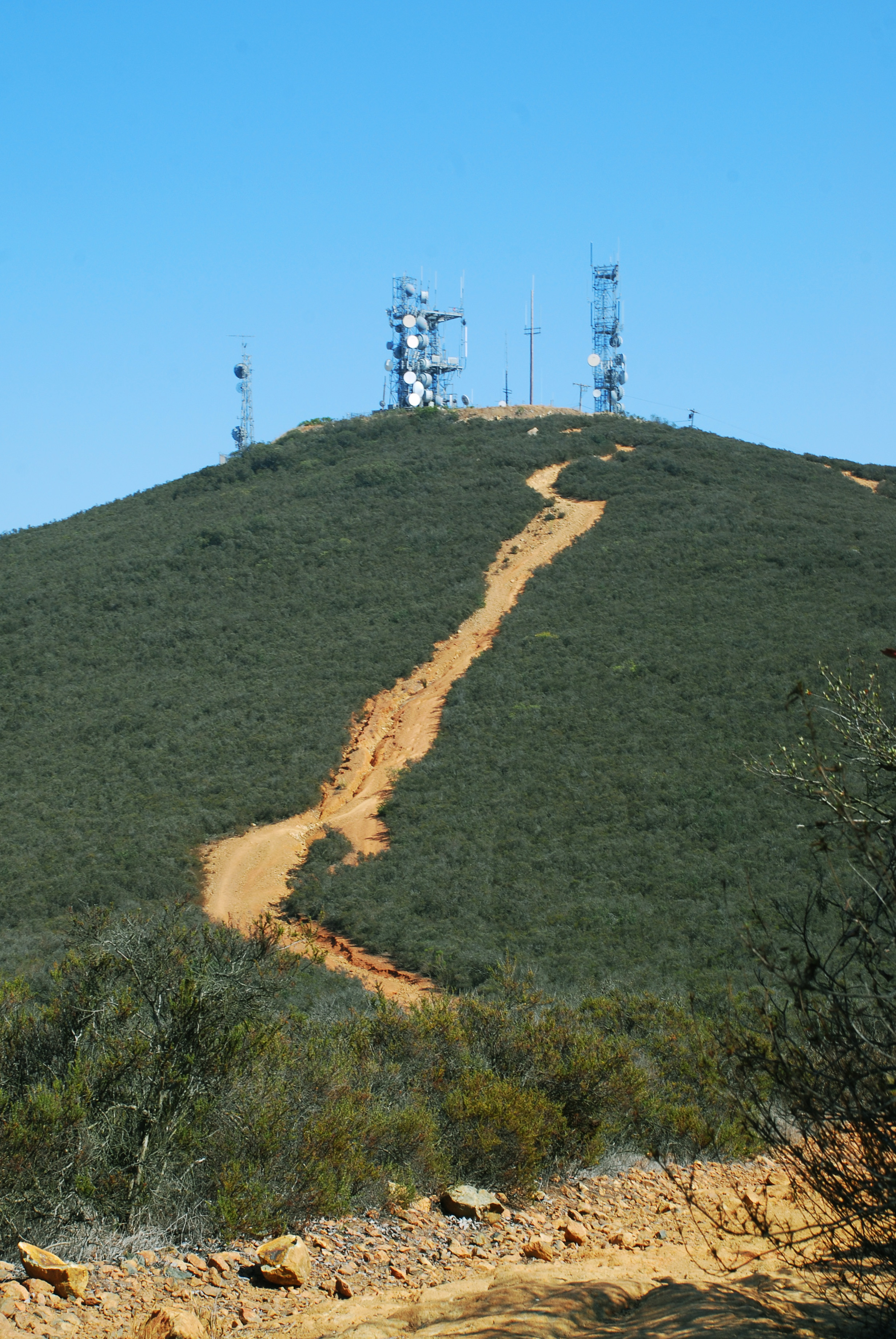
View of Black Mountain as seen from one of the hiking trails on a nearby peak, from the north of the summit

Black Mountain is the central feature of Black Mountain Open Space Park, standing at 1,554 feet (474 m) tall. At its peak, Black Mountain is host to a handful of communication towers, including a retired AT&T microwave repeater tower and a Verizon wireless communication facility.

Prior to European contact, the Kumeyaay lived on the mountain and referred to it as "Amat Kwanyil".

The mountain is also an extinct volcano, having last erupted 118–125 million years ago. Black Mountain is a part of the Santiago Peak Volcanics, which are a group of volcanoes that originated as a chain of volcanic islands 150 million years ago.

=== Mine ===
Tucked away in the Black Mountain canyon is an abandoned arsenic mine, accessible via pathways branching off of the park's Miner's Ridge Loop trail. The mine was established in the 1920s by Escondido rancher, rodeo cowboy, and actor Frank Hopkins, due to the demand for white arsenic, a key ingredient in pesticides that attacked infesting boll weevils. As the boll weevil population shrank, the demand for white arsenic fell, causing the abandoning of the mine in 1927. According to a 1939 article, published in the Vista Press, Hopkins also used this mine to find gold.

In 2016, the University of San Diego conducted soil sampling in the vicinity of the mine site. Some locations, including portions of the Miner's Ridge Loop trail, revealed high levels of arsenic present. As of January 6, 2017, the San Diego City Attorney recommended closure of the lower sections of the trail pending further study.

The Jas Arnold Trail for All People (located at the Miner's Ridge Loop parking lot), a handicapped-accessible trail named in honor of the park's long-serving Chair of the Citizen's Advisory Committee who passed in May 2016, remains open to the public. The Lilac Canyon Trail which connects this same parking lot to the Glider Port also remains open.

== Hiking ==
The park is a popular hiking spot, offering numerous trails of varying length and difficulty.

In June 2024, a hiker died on Black Mountain while hiking Nighthawk Trail.

=== Trails ===
- Lusardi Creek Loop Trail
- East Rim Trail
- Miner's Ridge Loop Trail
  - 2.3 miles (3.7 km) with 670 feet (200 m) of climbing
  - Accessible via Carmel Valley Rd.
- Glider Point Trail
- Nighthawk Trail
  - Accessible via Hilltop Community Park
- Little Black Loop Trail
- South Point View Trail

== See also ==
- List of parks in San Diego
