= Gurkha (disambiguation) =

Gurkhas are soldiers from Nepal.

Gurkha, Gorkha or Gorkhali may also refer to:

== People ==
- Nepalis, citizens of Nepal, also known as Gorkhas and Gorkhalis
- Indian Gorkha, the Nepali-speaking people of India
- Burmese Gurkha, the Nepali-speaking people of Myanmar

== Military ==
- Nepalese Army, also known as the Gorkha or Gorkhali Army
- Brigade of Gurkhas, British Army units composed of soldiers from Nepal
- Royal Gurkha Rifles, Rifle regiment of the British Army, forming part of the Brigade of Gurkhas
- Gorkha regiments (India), Indian Army units composed of soldiers mostly from Nepal and Nepali-speaking soldiers from India
- Gurkha Contingent, a department of the Singapore Police Force composed of soldiers from Nepal
- Gurkha Reserve Unit, Brunei para-military force composed of soldiers from Nepal
- HMS Gurkha, the name of several Royal Navy ships

== Places ==
- Kingdom of Nepal, also called the Gorkha Empire
- Gorkha District, a district in Nepal
- Gorkha Municipality, a municipality in Nepal
- Gorkha Kingdom, the kingdom from which the modern Nepal was formed
- Gorkhaland Territorial Administration, a autonomous administrative division in India

== Companies ==
- Gorkha Airlines, an airline in Nepal
- Gorkha Beer, a brand of beer brewed in Nepal

== Organizations ==
- British Gurkhas Nepal, Administrative organisation of the British Army in Nepal
- Bharatiya Gorkha Parisangh, an non-government organisation in India
- Darjeeling Gorkha Hill Council, a semi-autonomous body in India
- Gorkha Janmukti Morcha, a political party in India
- Gorkha National Liberation Front, a political party in India

== Wars ==
- Anglo-Nepalese War, also known as Anglo-Gurkha War
- Sino-Nepalese War, also known as Sino-Gorkha War
- Nepal–Sikh war, also known as Gorkha–Sikh War

== Other uses ==
- Gorkhapatra, a state-run newspaper in Nepal
- Terradyne Armored Vehicles Gurkha, an tactical armored vehicle
- Force Gurkha, an SUV by Force Motors
- Gorkhali (newspaper), a Nepali-language newspaper in India
- Gurkha (film), a 2019 Indian Tamil-language comedy film
- Gorkha (film), an unreleased Indian film about Gorkha regiments of the Indian Army
- The Gurkha (foaled 2013), an Irish Thoroughbred racehorse

== See also ==
- Kukri, a curved knife also known as a Gurkha knife
