= Užička Crna Gora =

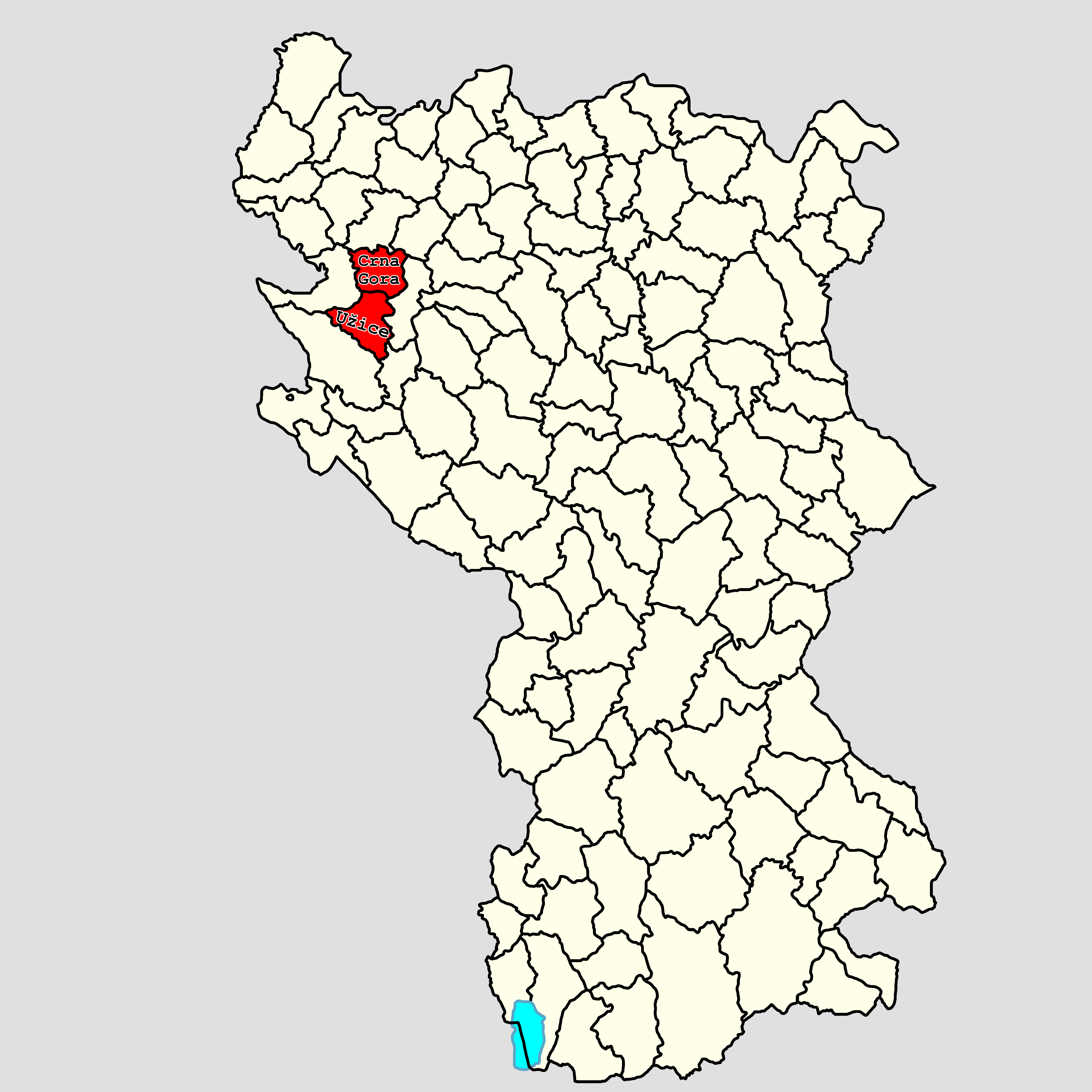
Borders of the Užice Crna Gora Region in the Kingdom of Serbia

Užička Crna Gora (Serbian Cyrillic: Ужичка Црна Гора, "Black Mountains of Užice") is a mountainous region in western Serbia around the town of Užice. To the east lies Šumadija; Užička Crna Gora borders to the region of Rudnik, which lies in Šumadija, however, the border between the two is unclear due to historical administrative changes.
