= Black Mountain (Montana) =

Summit in Montana, United States

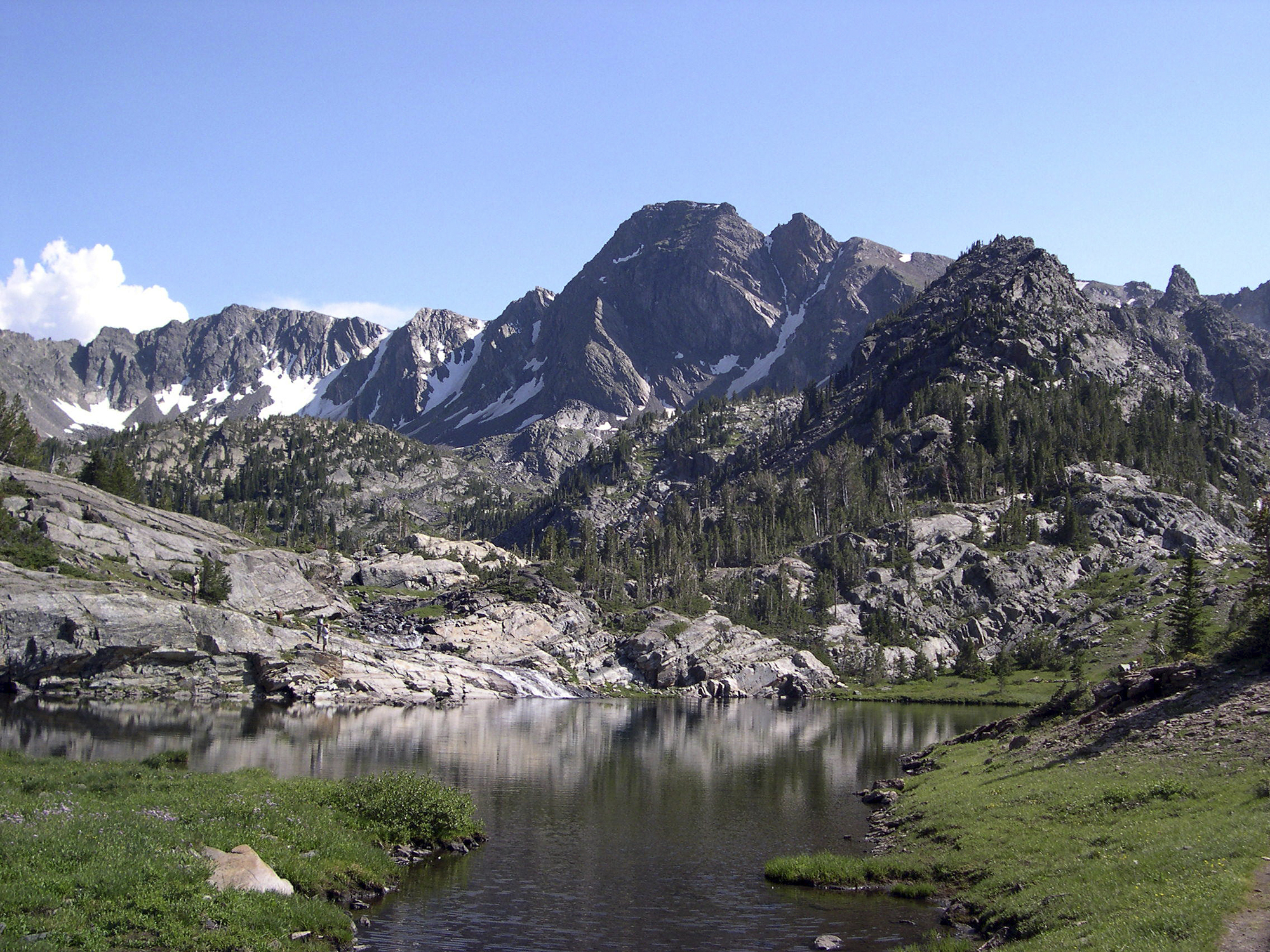
- North aspect

Highest point
- Elevation: 10,941 ft (3,335 m)
- Prominence: 1,321 ft (403 m)
- Parent peak: Mount Cowen (11,217 ft)
- Isolation: 5.76 mi (9.27 km)
- Coordinates: 45°28′17″N 110°27′59″W

Geography
- Location within Montana Location within the United States
- Country: United States
- State: Montana
- County: Park County
- Protected area: Absaroka–Beartooth Wilderness
- Parent range: Rocky Mountains; Absaroka Range
- Topo map: USGS Mount Cowen

Climbing
- Easiest route: class 2 hiking

Black Mountain is a 10,941-foot (3,335-metre) summit located in Park County, Montana, United States.

== Description ==
Black Mountain is located in the Absaroka Range which is a subrange of the Rocky Mountains. It is situated five miles (8.0 km) southeast of Pine Creek, Montana, and 13 miles (21 km) south-southeast of Livingston. The peak is set within the Absaroka–Beartooth Wilderness on land managed by Gallatin National Forest. Precipitation runoff from the mountain drains into headwaters of Pine Creek which is a tributary of the Yellowstone River. Topographic relief is significant as the west aspect rises over 4,300 feet (1,300 meters) above South Fork Pine Creek in 1.2 mile, and the north aspect rises 1,900 feet (580 meters) above Pine Creek Lake in three-quarters mile. The mountain's descriptive toponym was officially adopted in 1923 by the United States Board on Geographic Names.

== Climate ==
Based on the Köppen climate classification, Black Mountain is located in a subarctic climate zone characterized by long, usually very cold winters, and short, cool to mild summers. Winter temperatures can drop below −10 °F with wind chill factors below −30 °F.

== See also ==
- Geology of the Rocky Mountains
- Mountains of Park County, Montana

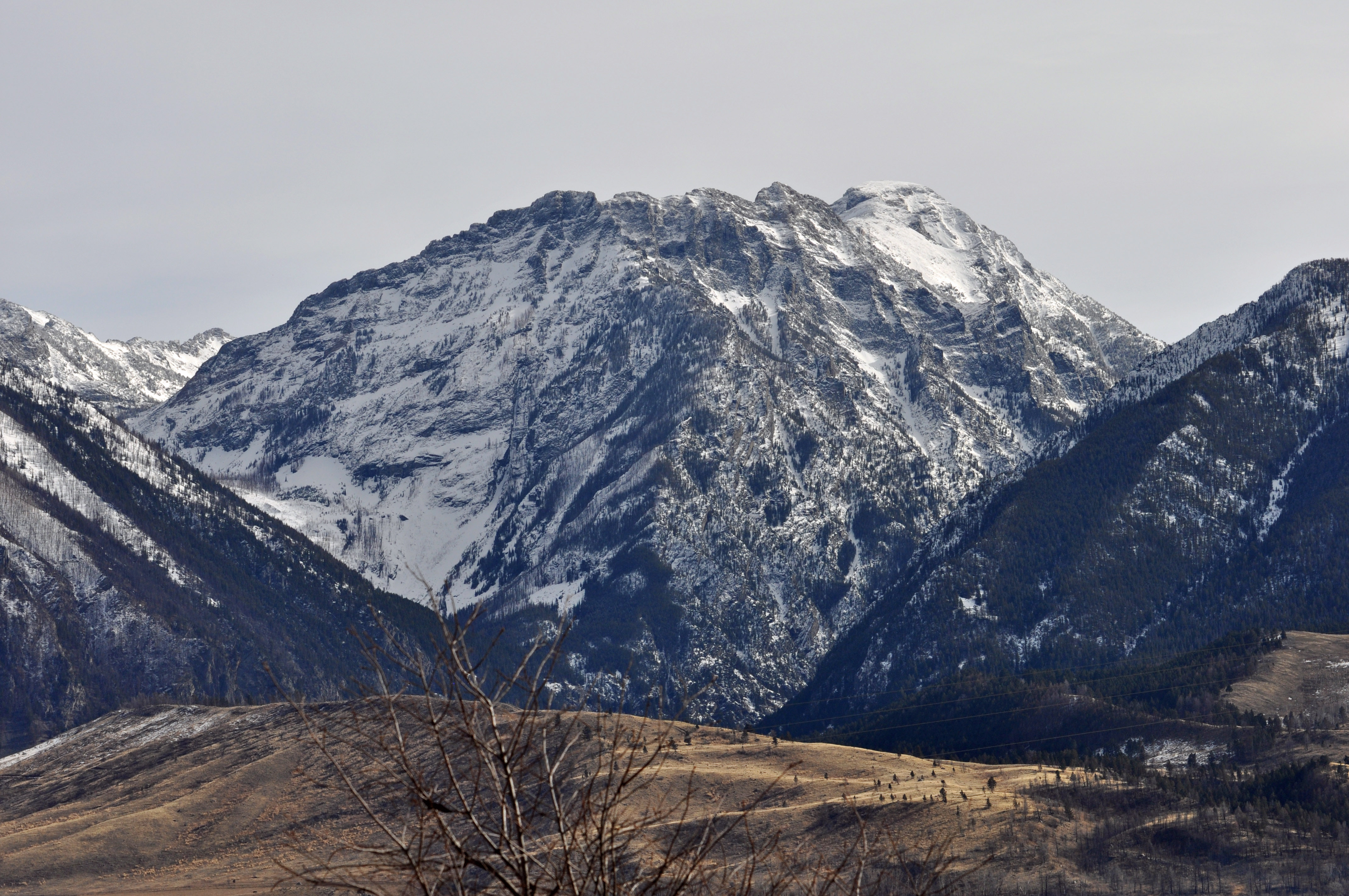
West aspect of Black Mountain
