= Black Mountain (San Benito County, California) =

Highest point
- Elevation: 3,758 ft (1,145 m) NAVD 88
- Coordinates: 36°22′58″N 120°51′21″W

Geography
- Location: San Benito County, California, U.S.
- Parent range: Diablo Range
- Topo map: USGS Hernandez Reservoir

Black Mountain is a mountain in the Diablo Range of San Benito County, California, west of the Hernandez Reservoir and approximately 20 miles (32 km) southeast of Pinnacles National Park.
