= Gorkhali (newspaper) =

Gorkhali was a Nepali-language weekly newspaper published in Varanasi, India. It began publication in 1919. Devi Prasad Sapkota was the editor of the newspaper.

Gorkhali was critical of the Rana rule in Nepal, arguing that their rule was to blame for mass poverty in the country and the cause behind emigration amongst Gurkhas. The publication also gave its support to the Indian nationalist movements, the Non-Cooperation Movement and satyagrahs.

Personalities associated with the publication included Nan Singh Gurung, Lakshmi Prasad Sapkota, Dharanidhar Koirala, Dinanath Sharma and Pandit Krishna Prasad.

The paper was banned by the British colonial authorities in 1922.
