= Martin Černohorský =

Czech physicist and academic (1923–2024)

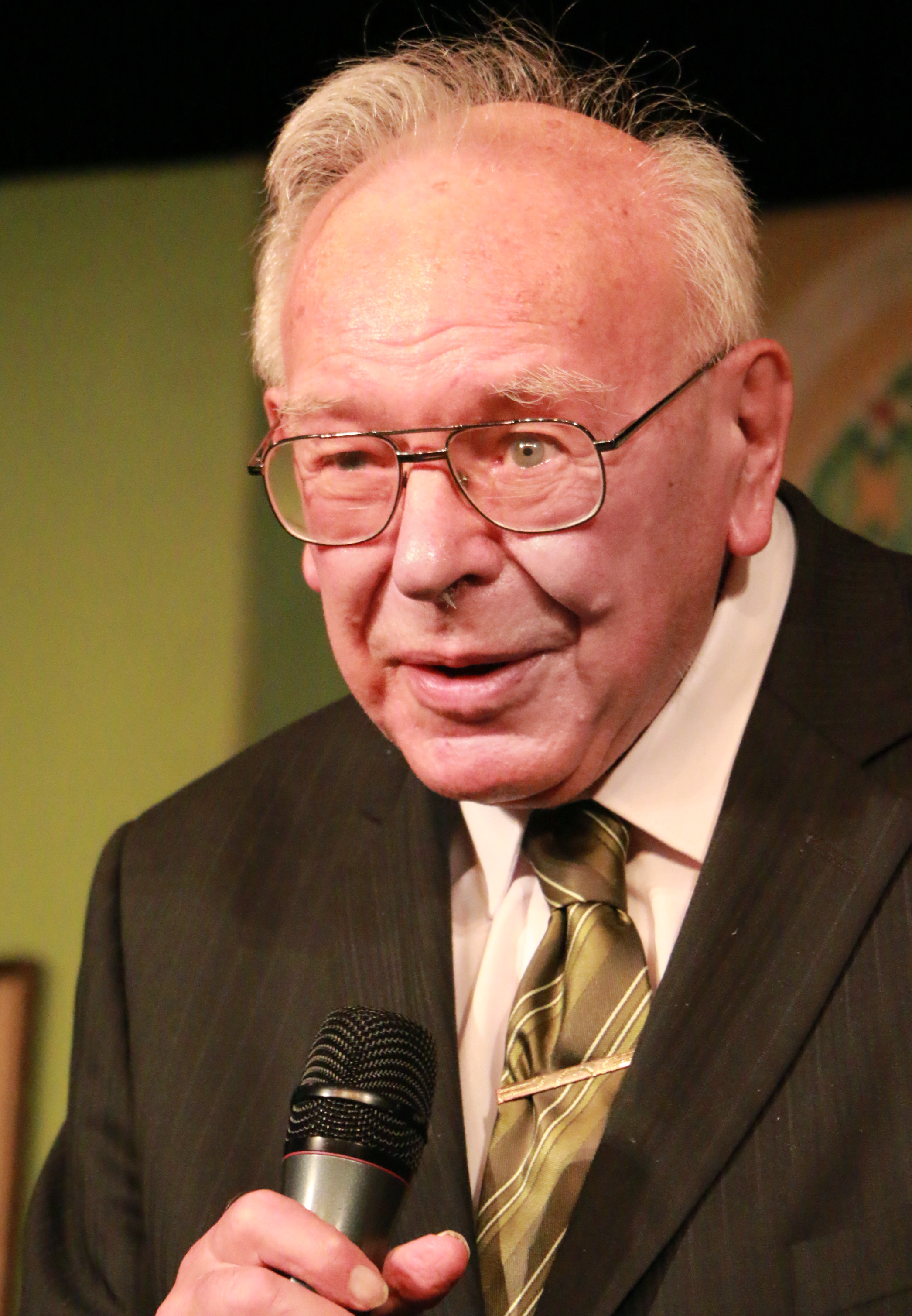
Černohorský in 2016

Martin Černohorský (31 August 1923 – 9 February 2024) was a Czech physicist, professor of physics at Masaryk University, and the first rector of the Silesian University in Opava. Černohorský died on 9 February 2024, at the age of 100.

== Education and academic qualifications ==
- 1990: Professor. Masaryk University, Brno.
- 1967: Associate Professor. Masaryk University, Brno.
- 1963: Candidate of Sciences (CSc., Ph.D.-equiv). Czechoslovak Academy of Sciences, Prague.
- 1952. Dr. rer. nat. Faculty of Science, Masaryk University, Brno. Dissertation: Mikrostrukturní analysa Röntgenovými paprsky [Microstructural analysis by X-rays]
- 1950: Teacher of Mathematics and Physics. Faculty of Science, Masaryk University, Brno.
- 1942: Matura. Reform Grammar School, Brno.

== Select publications ==
- Černohorský, M. (1988) The rotation in Newton's wording of his First Law of Motion. In Proceedings of the Tercentenary Celebration "Isaac Newton's Philosophiae Naturalis Principia Mathematica", Lublin 1987, Singapore–New Jersey–Hong Kong: World Scientific Publ. Co., pp. 28-46
- Černohorský, M. (1975) Newtonova formulace prvního pohybového zákona [Newton's formulation of the First Law of Motion]. In Pokroky matematiky, fyziky a astronomie [Advances in mathematics, physics and astronomy], Prague: Union of Czech Mathematicians and Physicists, vol. 20, pp. 344-349
- Černohorský, M. (1968) Metrologie mřížkových parametrů [Metrology of grid parameters] I. Rozpravy Československé akademie věd - řada technických věd [Proceedings of the Czechoslovak Academy of Sciences - Technical Sciences Series], Prague: Academia, vol. 78, no. 5
- Černohorský, M. (1967) Přesné měření parametrů atomových mřížek [Precise measurement of atomic lattice parameters]. In Šafránek J.: Referáty semináře "Metodika práce na rtg. difrakčním goniometru" [Papers of the seminar "Methodology of work on X-ray diffraction goniometer"], Živohošť, 15-27 May 1967, Prague: Ústřední dům techniky Československé vědecko-technické společnosti [Central House of Technology of the Czechoslovak Scientific and Technical Society], pp. 255-259 and 265-271
- Černohorský, M. (1961) A new set of charts for two-parameter lattices. Acta Crystallographica, vol. 14, pp. 1081-1083
- Černohorský, M. (1961) Effective D-method for lattice parameter determination of cubic, hexagonal and tetragonal substances. In American Crystallographic Association. Abstracts of the Annual Meeting July 31 – August 4, 1961, University of Colorado, Boulder, p. 16
- Černohorský, M. (1961) Summer School in Modern Methods of Crystal-Structure Determination. Czechoslovak Journal of Physics, vol. 11, pp. 227-228
- Černohorský, M. (1960) Determination of accuracy in measuring the parameters of tetragonal and hexagonal lattices. Czechoslovak Journal of Physics, vol. 10, pp. 225-232
- Černohorský, M. (1959) Měření mezirovinných vzdáleností zářením různých vlnových délek [Measurement of interplane distances with radiation of different wavelengths]. Práce Brněnské základny Československé akademie věd [Works of the Brno Branch of the Czechoslovak Academy of Sciences], vol. 31, pp. 148-156
- Černohorský, M. (1959) Rentgenová, elektronová a neutronová difraktografie. – Elektrická a magnetická analysa. – Kalorimetrie [X-ray, electron and neutron diffraction. - Electrical and magnetic analysis. - Calorimetry]. In Píšek F.: Nauka o materiálu II [The science of materials], Prague: Academia, pp. 14-30, 78-96, 97-159, and 648-650
- Černohorský, M. (1958) Nomogramy pro kubické mřížky [Nomograms for cubic grids]. Works of the Brno Branch of the Czechoslovak Academy of Sciences, Brno, vol. 30, pp. 131-153
- Černohorský, M. (1958) Grafické řešení Braggovy rovnice [Graphical solution of the Bragg's law]. Works of the Brno Branch of the Czechoslovak Academy of Sciences, vol. 30, pp. 155-159
- Černohorský, M. (1952) Podílová metoda pro absolutní rentgenografické stanovení mřížkových konstant rovinnou komorou [The ratio method for absolute X-ray determination of lattice parameters by the flat camera]. Spisy Přírodovědecké fakulty Masarykovy univerzity v Brně, vol. 1952/10, no. 342, pp. 327-354

== See also ==
- Tomáš W. Pavlíček and Barbora Kulawiaková (eds.): Martin Černohorský. Studenti v centru pozornosti [Martin Černohorský. Students at the centre of attention], Brno: Masaryk University, 2023. ISBN 978-80-280-0428-6
