= Black Mountain (Michigan) =

Hill located at Presque Isle County in Michigan

Coordinates: 45.5248°N 84.2677°W

Black Mountain is a large hill in Presque Isle County, Michigan. Located 10 miles north of Onaway, Michigan, the mountain is a popular recreational activity site and is part of the state-owned Black Mountain Forest Recreation Area, which is operated by the Michigan Department of Natural Resources.

== History ==
Black Mountain and the range in which it is situated were created by the glacial movement of the last major ice age. Gradually, the areas around Black Mountain have been developed. The Brighton area is now home to over 7000 people; Black Mountain lies in a residential zone of varying density. Due to deforestation, erosion has become an increasingly severe problem on parts of the mountain.

Beginning in the 1990s, the property around Black Mountain was developed; this process continues today. The road next to the mountain was extended. To date, two houses have been built at the base of the mountain. The owners of the mountain have donated the land to the state of Michigan and it is now a state park.

== Geography and climate ==
Black Mountain was created by glaciers in the last major ice age. The range is characterized by medium to steep grade, with deep valleys and high peaks. Located in northeastern Michigan, the base elevation is approximately 950 feet (290 m), while the highest point is over 1,000 feet (300 m). Black Mountain and the surrounding hills range in vertical rise from as little as 20 feet (6.1 m) to as much as 100 feet (30 m) on the mountain itself. Woodland Lake lies at the base of the western hills, and is around 50 feet (15 m) deep.

The area experiences a four-season temperate climate, with cold winters and hot summers. The largest amounts of precipitation occur in the months of December and January, while July and August are the driest. The typical winter season begins in November and lasts well into March. Annual snowfall averages 70 to 90 inches (2,300 mm). Daily January temperatures normally reach 20 to 30 °F (−1 °C), with nighttime lows of 5 to 15 degrees. July highs are 75 to 85 degrees, and lows are 55 to 65 degrees.

== Other attractions ==
There are multiple trails going around Black Mountain and through it. The network of paths throughout the mountain, while most often used for dirt biking, are also used for mountain biking, and other similar sports. During the winter season, the paths on the mountain are a popular attraction for area snowmobilers.
