= Black Mountain: An Exploration in Community =

1972 book by Martin Duberman

- Author: Martin Duberman
- Subject: Black Mountain College
- Publisher: E. P. Dutton
- Publication date: 1972
- Pages: 527

Black Mountain: An Exploration in Community is a 1972 book about Black Mountain College by Martin Duberman.

== Bibliography ==
- Anfam, David (2005). "Review of Black Mountain College: Experiment in Art". The Burlington Magazine. 147 (1228): 500. ISSN 0007-6287. JSTOR 20074052.
- Conkin, Paul K. (1973). "Review of Black Mountain: An Exploration in Community". The Journal of American History. 60 (2): 510–512. doi:10.2307/2936861. ISSN 0021-8723. JSTOR 2936861.
- Davenport, F. Garvin (1975). "Review of Black Mountain: An Exploration in Community". The American Historical Review. 80 (2): 524–525. doi:10.2307/1850719. ISSN 0002-8762. JSTOR 1850719.
- Ferrell, Henry C. (1973). "Review of Black Mountain: An Exploration in Community". The Journal of Southern History. 39 (3): 469–470. doi:10.2307/2206294. ISSN 0022-4642. JSTOR 2206294.
- Friedenberg, Edgar Z. (November 16, 1972). "Schools for Scandal". The New York Review of Books. ISSN 0028-7504.
- Goldberg, Maxwell H. (1973). "Review of Black Mountain: An Exploration in Community". The Journal of Higher Education. 44 (9): 736–737. doi:10.2307/1980607. ISSN 0022-1546. JSTOR 1980607.
- Murray, Savannah Paige (2017). "Review of Black Mountain: An Exploration in Community". Appalachian Journal. 44/45: 632–635. ISSN 0090-3779. JSTOR 45124323.
- Tindall, George B. (1973). "Review of Black Mountain: An Exploration in Community". The North Carolina Historical Review. 50 (2): 197–199. ISSN 0029-2494. JSTOR 23528942.
- Weber, Ronald (1974). "History: Personal and Impersonal". The Review of Politics. 36 (1): 185–189. ISSN 0034-6705. JSTOR 1406087.
- Zinnes, Harriet (1974). "Review of Black Mountain: An Exploration in Community". Paideuma. 3 (1): 129–132. ISSN 0090-5674. JSTOR 24725496.
