= Svartfjellet, Kvaløya =

Mountain in Hammerfest, Norway

Svartfjellet (Norwegian); Muvrarášša (Northern Sami)
- Location of the mountain

Highest point
- Elevation: 629 m (2,064 ft)
- Prominence: 629 m (2,064 ft)
- Coordinates: 70.5843°N 23.8593°E

Geography
- Location: Finnmark, Norway
- Topo map: 1936 III Hammerfest

Svartfjellet (Norwegian) or Muvrarášša (Northern Sami) is the highest mountain on the island of Kvaløya in Finnmark county, Norway. The 629-metre (2,064 ft) tall summit lies in Hammerfest Municipality, about 11 kilometres (6.8 mi) southeast of the town of Hammerfest.
