= Shangzhou District =

Shangzhou 商州区
- District
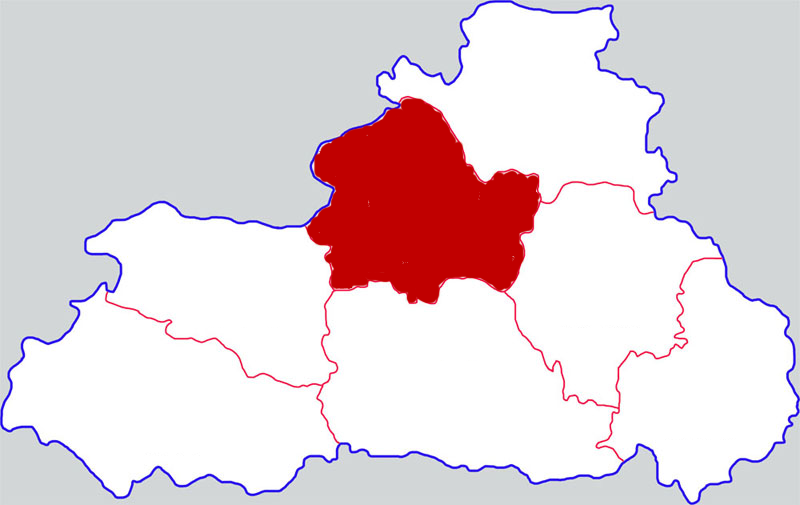
- Shangzhou in Shangluo

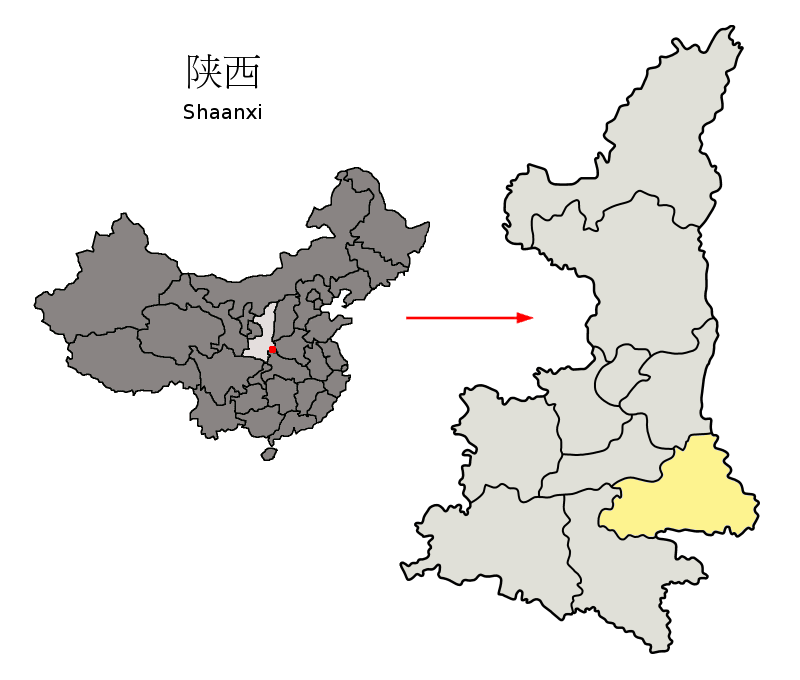
- Shangluo in Shaanxi
- Country: People's Republic of China
- Province: Shaanxi
- Prefecture-level city: Shangluo

Area
  - Total: 2,672 km^{2} (1,032 sq mi)

Population (2018)
  - Total: 540,500
  - Density: 202.3/km^{2} (523.9/sq mi)
- Time zone: UTC+8 (China standard time)
- Postal code: 726000
- Licence plates: 陕H

Shangzhou District (simplified Chinese: 商州区; traditional Chinese: 商州區; pinyin: Shāngzhōu Qū), formerly Shangxian (or Shang County) and Shangzhou County-level City, is a district of Shangluo, Shaanxi, China.

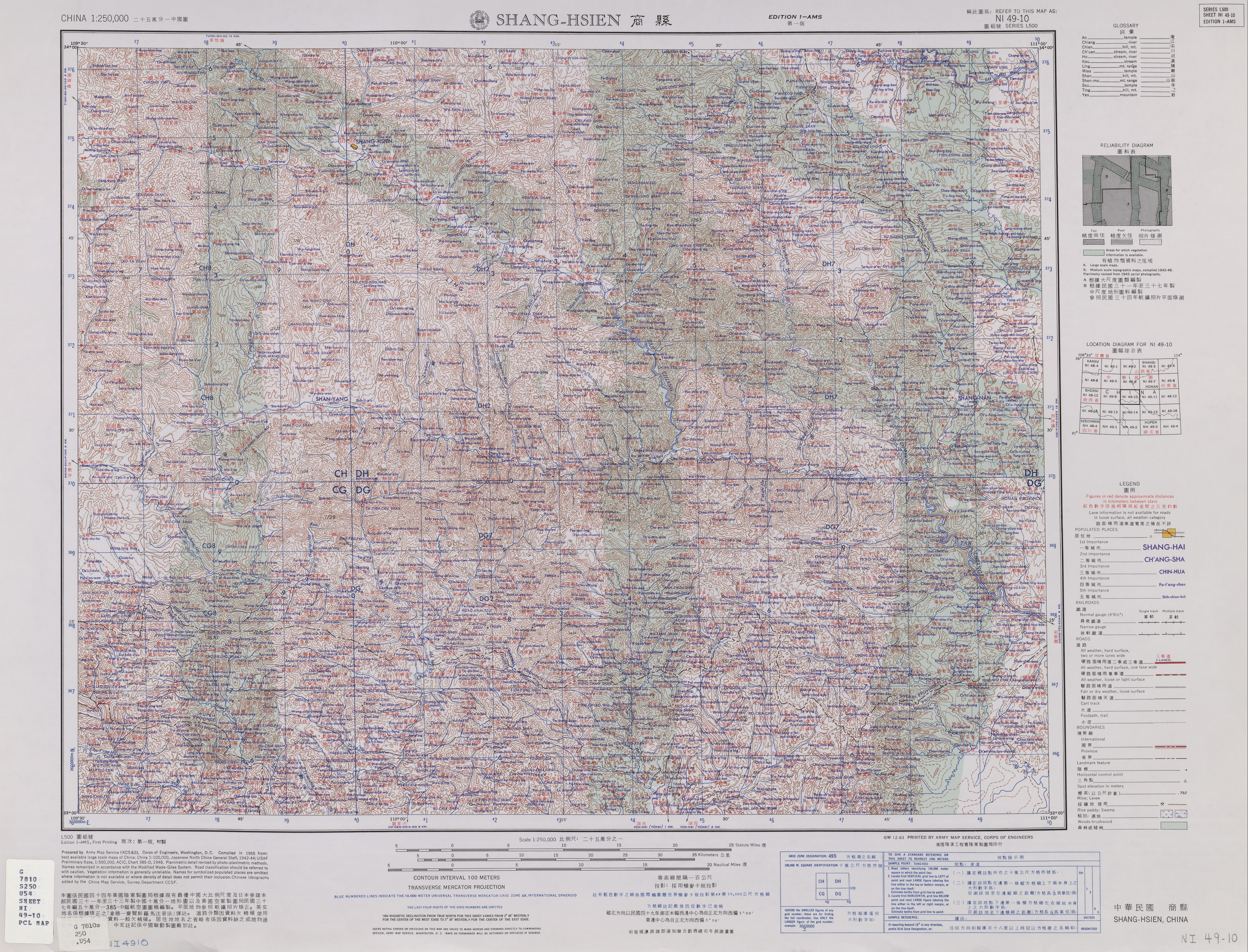
Map including Shang County (labeled as 商縣 SHANG-HSIEN (walled)) (AMS, 1955)

Shangzhou District governs 37 townships-level divisions.

== Administrative divisions ==
As of 2019, Shangzhou District is divided to 4 subdistricts, 14 towns and 9 others.

Subdistricts

- Chengguan Subdistrict (城关街道)
- Dazhaoyu Subdistrict (大赵峪街道)
- Chenyuan Subdistrict (陈塬街道)
- Liuwan Subdistrict (刘湾街道)

Towns

- Yecun (夜村镇)
- Shahezi (沙河子镇)
- Yangyuhe (杨峪河镇)
- Jinlingsi (金陵寺镇)
- Heishan (黑山镇)
- Yangxie (杨斜镇)
- Majie (麻街镇)
- Muhuguan (牧护关镇)
- Dajing (大荆镇)
- Yaoshi (腰市镇)
- Banqiao (板桥镇)
- Beikuanping (北宽坪镇)
- Sanchahe (三岔河镇)
- Yancun (闫村镇)

Others

- Erlongshan Reservoir(二龙山水库)
- Nanqin Reservoir(南秦水库)
- Erlongshan State Forest Farm(二龙山国营林场)
- Shangdan Circulation Industrial Park(商丹循环工业园)
- Jinghe Industrial Park(荆河工业园)
- Jinghe Agricultural Demonstration Park(荆河农业示范园)
- University Park(高校园区)
- Shangluo Vocational and Technical College Township(商洛职业技术学院)
- Silicon Fluoride Industrial Park (氟化硅产业业园)

== Climate ==
Climate data for Shangzhou, elevation 747 m (2,451 ft), (1991–2020 normals, extremes 1981–2010)
Month	Jan	Feb	Mar	Apr	May	Jun	Jul	Aug	Sep	Oct	Nov	Dec	Year
Record high °C (°F)	17.9 (64.2)	23.7 (74.7)	30.3 (86.5)	34.6 (94.3)	36.3 (97.3)	40.7 (105.3)	38.2 (100.8)	38.4 (101.1)	39.3 (102.7)	31.6 (88.9)	25.8 (78.4)	21.3 (70.3)	40.7 (105.3)
Mean daily maximum °C (°F)	6.4 (43.5)	9.7 (49.5)	15.2 (59.4)	21.5 (70.7)	25.4 (77.7)	29.3 (84.7)	30.6 (87.1)	29.1 (84.4)	24.2 (75.6)	19.2 (66.6)	13.6 (56.5)	8.0 (46.4)	19.3 (66.8)
Daily mean °C (°F)	0.6 (33.1)	3.6 (38.5)	8.5 (47.3)	14.3 (57.7)	18.4 (65.1)	22.5 (72.5)	24.6 (76.3)	23.4 (74.1)	18.6 (65.5)	13.2 (55.8)	7.4 (45.3)	2.2 (36.0)	13.1 (55.6)
Mean daily minimum °C (°F)	−3.7 (25.3)	−0.9 (30.4)	3.3 (37.9)	8.5 (47.3)	12.6 (54.7)	17.0 (62.6)	20.3 (68.5)	19.4 (66.9)	14.7 (58.5)	8.9 (48.0)	3.0 (37.4)	−2.1 (28.2)	8.4 (47.1)
Record low °C (°F)	−12.4 (9.7)	−10.3 (13.5)	−8.6 (16.5)	−2.0 (28.4)	2.4 (36.3)	9.3 (48.7)	13.1 (55.6)	11.1 (52.0)	3.9 (39.0)	−4.6 (23.7)	−9.1 (15.6)	−13.9 (7.0)	−13.9 (7.0)
Average precipitation mm (inches)	8.3 (0.33)	12.9 (0.51)	28.0 (1.10)	43.9 (1.73)	69.6 (2.74)	79.2 (3.12)	123.2 (4.85)	106.3 (4.19)	107.8 (4.24)	58.8 (2.31)	25.5 (1.00)	6.2 (0.24)	669.7 (26.36)
Average precipitation days (≥ 0.1 mm)	4.8	5.5	7.5	8.0	10.1	9.9	12.3	11.2	11.5	10.3	6.6	3.8	101.5
Average snowy days	6.3	5.2	2.4	0.2	0	0	0	0	0	0	1.7	3.9	19.7
Average relative humidity (%)	56	58	58	59	64	67	75	77	78	74	66	58	66
Mean monthly sunshine hours	150.0	135.1	162.8	190.9	199.7	200.3	200.5	191.3	143.6	144.8	144.2	155.2	2,018.4
Percentage possible sunshine	48	43	44	49	46	47	46	47	39	42	47	51	46
Source: China Meteorological Administration
