= Kalapahar, Manipur =

Kalapahar
- Town
- Location in Manipur, India Kalapahar (India)
- Coordinates: 25.114°N 93.954°E
- Country: India
- State: Manipur
- District: Kangpokpi
- Elevation: 1,005 m (3,297 ft)

Population (2011 census)
  - Total: 7,476

Languages
  - Official: Thadou, Thangal Naga, Nepali
- Time zone: UTC+5:30 (IST)
- PIN: 795122
- Telephone code: 03880
- Vehicle registration: 03W
- Coastline: 0 kilometres (0 mi)
- Nearest city: Imphal
- Sex ratio: 989/1000 ♂/♀
- Literacy: 83%
- Lok Sabha constituency: Outer Manipur

Kalapahar, Manipur in Northeast India falls under Kangpokpi District, previously Senapati District

== Gallery ==
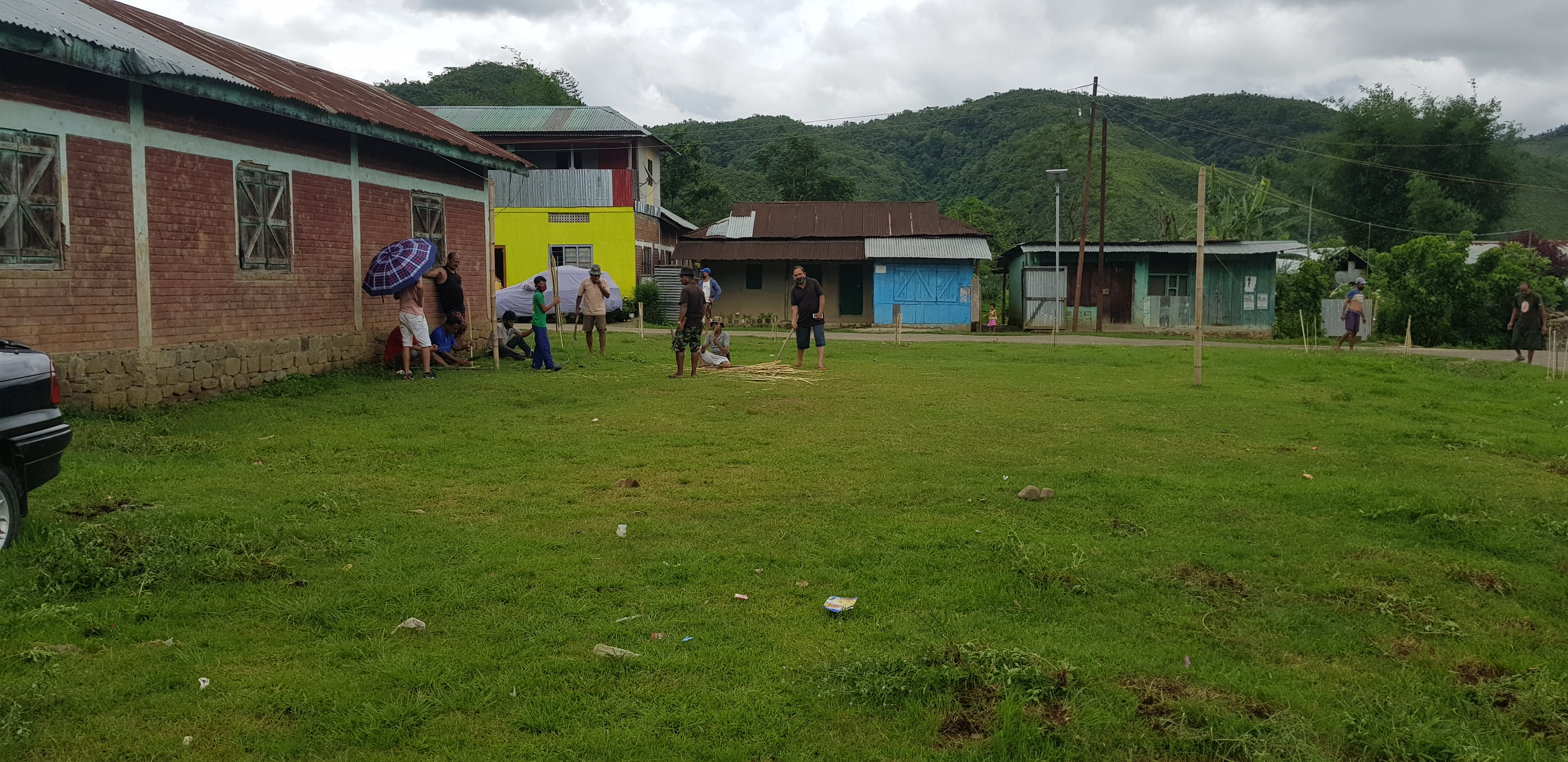
Thursday Bazar area

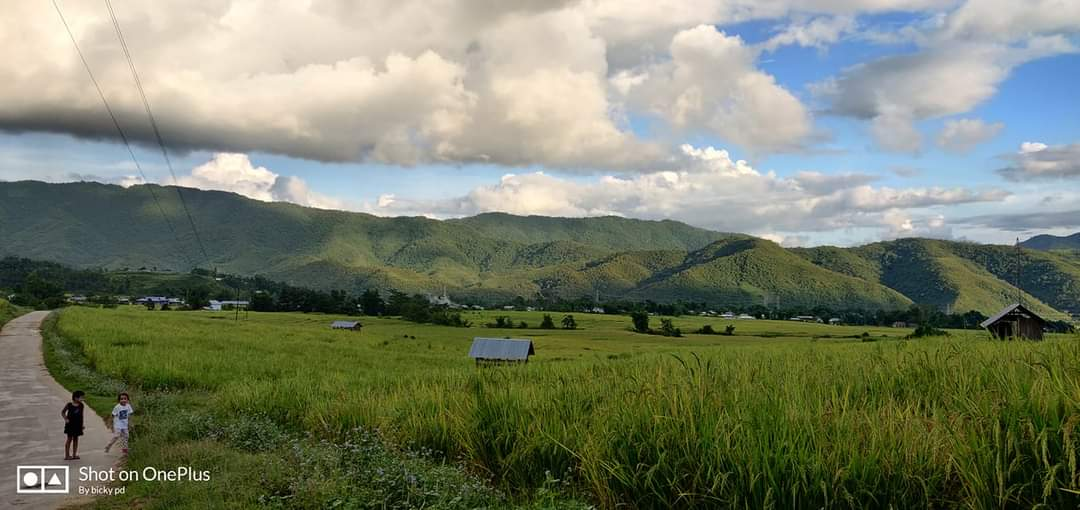
Paddy Fields of Upper Kalapahar

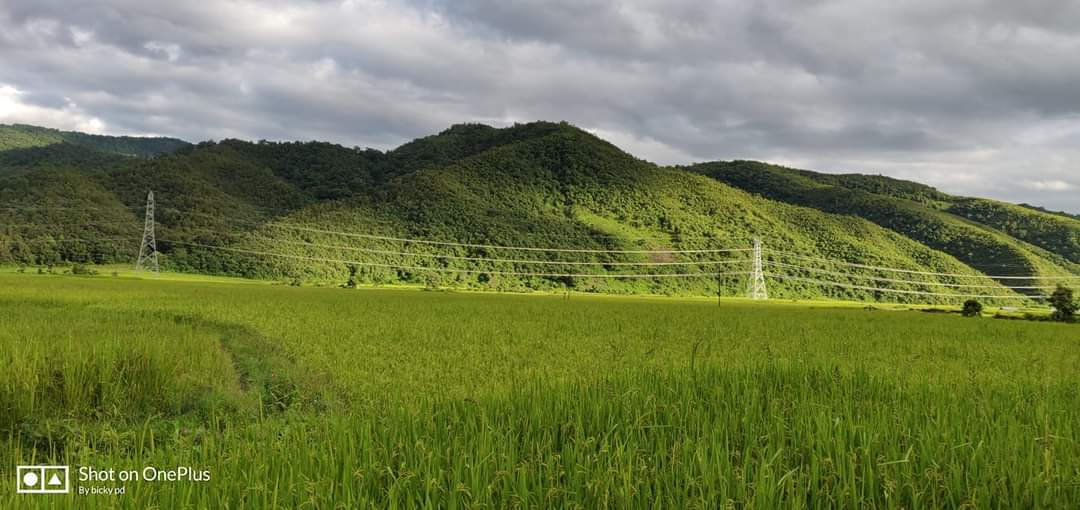
Greenary of Paddy field and the low mountain

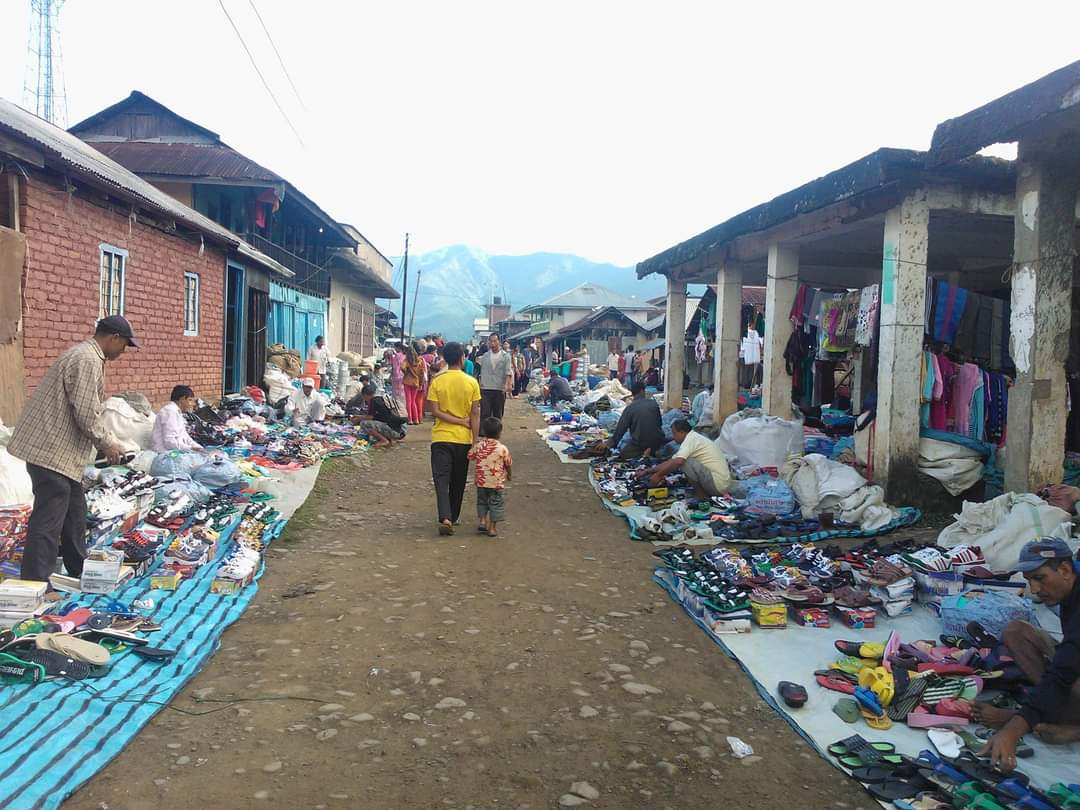
Thursday market.

== Population ==
The Lower Kalapahar village has population of 1725 of which 851 are males while 874 are females as per the census 2011. The Upper Kalapahar village has population of 472 of which 261 are males while 211 are females as per the census of 2011.
