= Černá Hora (Blansko District) =

- Market town
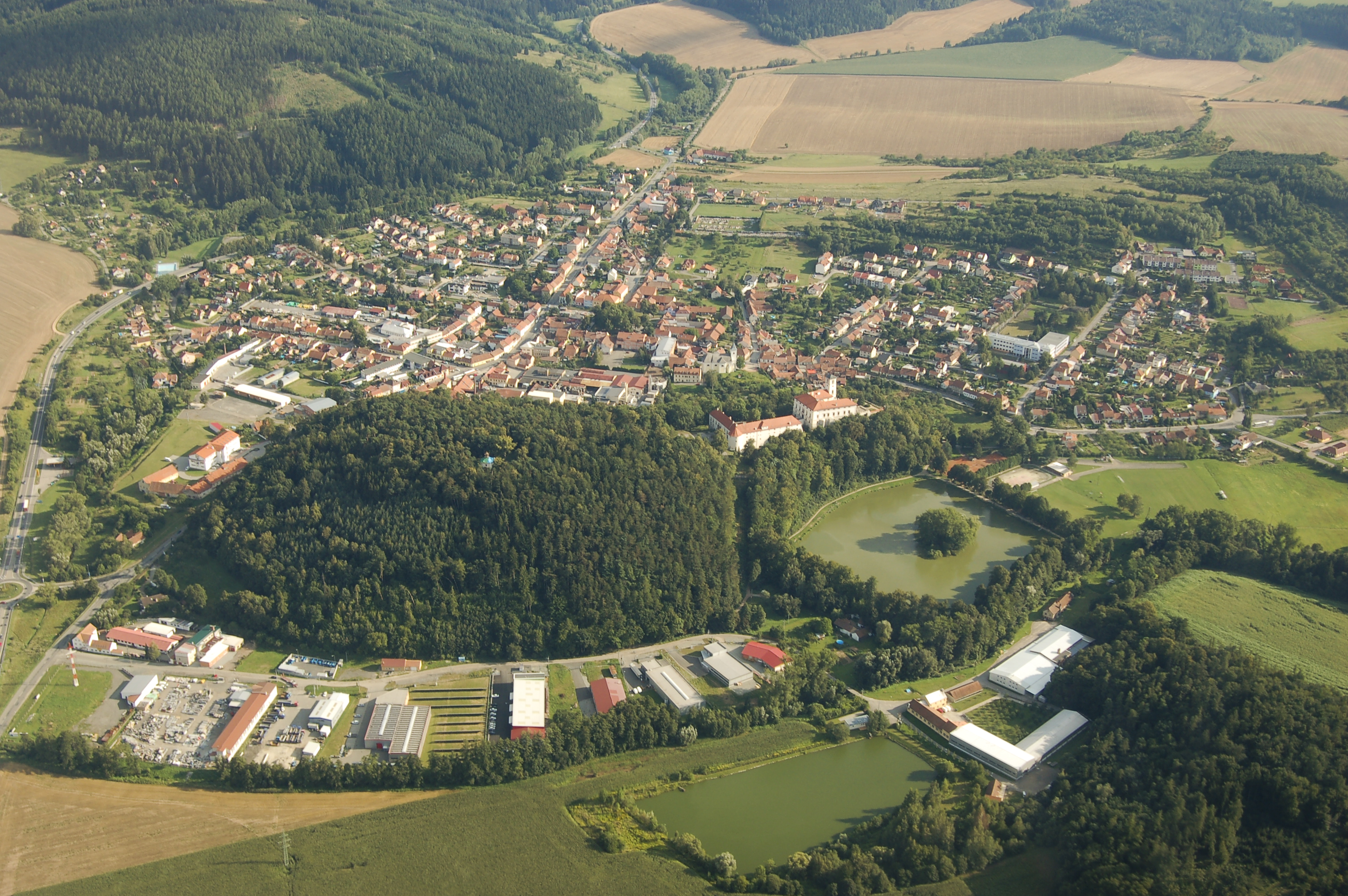
- Aerial view of Černá Hora

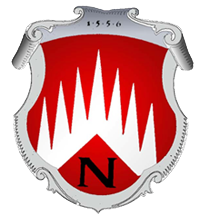
- Flag Coat of arms

- Location in the Czech Republic
- Coordinates: 49°24′49″N 16°34′53″E
- Country: Czech Republic
- Region: South Moravian
- District: Blansko
- First mentioned: 1279

Area
  - Total: 16.29 km^{2} (6.29 sq mi)
- Elevation: 328 m (1,076 ft)

Population (2026-01-01)
  - Total: 2,124
  - Density: 130.4/km^{2} (337.7/sq mi)
- Time zone: UTC+1 (CET)
  - Summer (DST): UTC+2 (CEST)
- Postal code: 679 21
- Website: www.cernahora.eu

Černá Hora (Czech pronunciation: [ˈtʃɛrnaː ˈɦora]) is a market town in Blansko District in the South Moravian Region of the Czech Republic. It has about 2,100 inhabitants.

== Etymology ==
The name Černá Hora (literally 'black mountain') comes from a hill whose coniferous vegetation looked darker than the surrounding deciduous vegetation. In Latin texts the place is called Nigromons or Czernahora, in German texts Czernahora.

== Geography ==
Černá Hora is located about 11 kilometres (7 mi) east of Blansko and 20 km (12 mi) northeast of Brno. It lies mostly in the Drahany Highlands, the northern part of extends into the Boskovice Furrow. The highest point is at 577 m (1,893 ft) above sea level. A dominant feature of the town is the hill Zámecký vrch at 377 m (1,237 ft). The Býkovka Stream flows through the northern part of the town.

== History ==
The first written mention of Černá Hora is from 1279, when the Černá Hora Castle was mentioned. It was located on crossroads of two trade routes. In 1390, it was first referred to as a market town. From 1333 to 1597, it was owned by the Černohorský of Boskovice noble family. In 1597, the estate was acquired by marriage by the Liechtenstein family. In 1859, the castle was bought by the Fries family. In 1945, the castle was confiscated by the state.

== Demographics ==
Historical population

Year	Pop.	±%
1869	1,105	—
1880	1,297	+17.4%
1890	1,224	−5.6%
1900	1,399	+14.3%
1910	1,541	+10.2%

Year	Pop.	±%
1921	1,534	−0.5%
1930	1,536	+0.1%
1950	1,501	−2.3%
1961	1,853	+23.5%
1970	1,910	+3.1%

Year	Pop.	±%
1980	2,002	+4.8%
1991	1,904	−4.9%
2001	1,913	+0.5%
2011	1,999	+4.5%
2021	2,201	+10.1%

Source: Censuses

== Transport ==
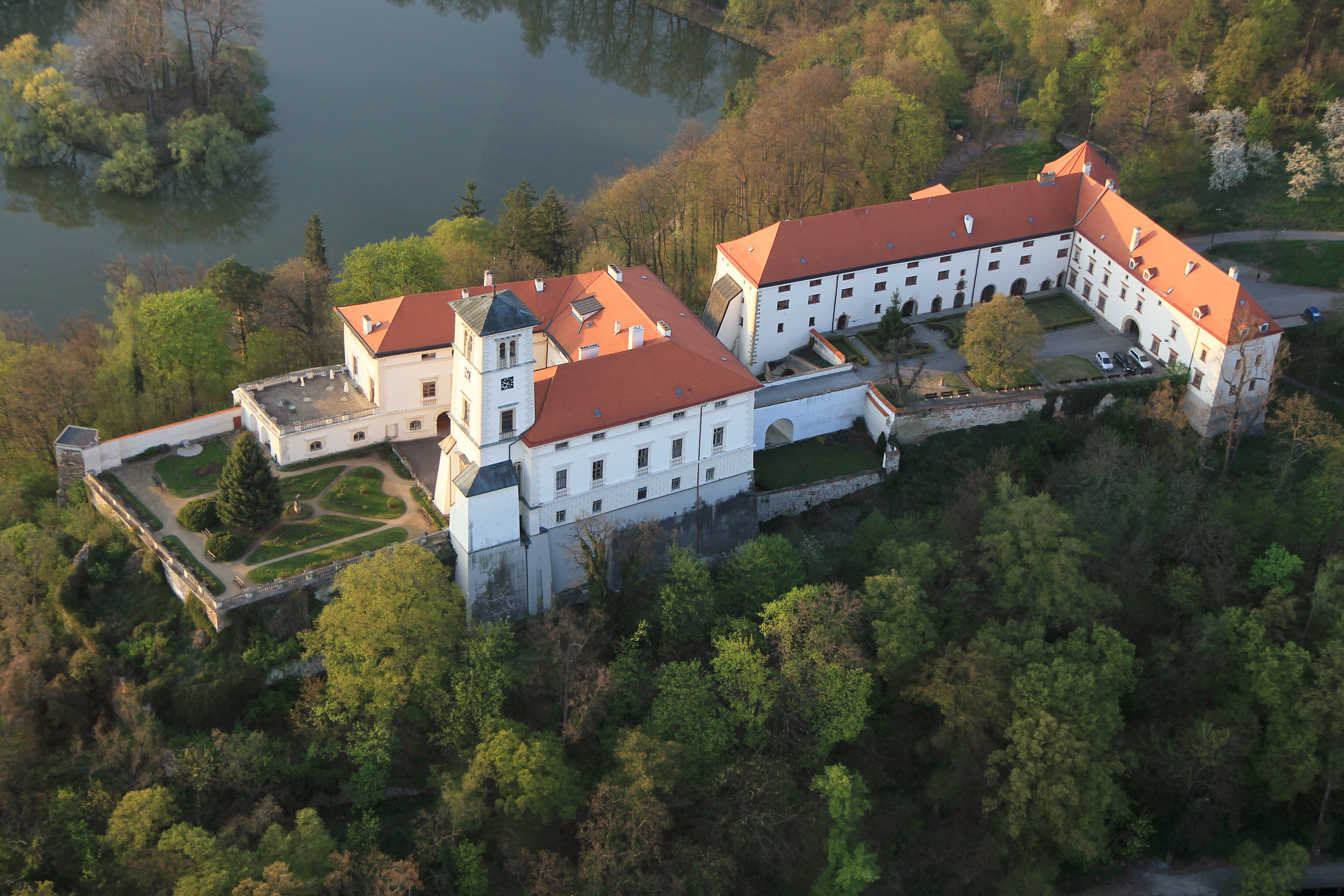
Černá Hora Castle

The I/43 road (part of the European route E461) from Brno to Svitavy runs next to the market town.

== Sights ==
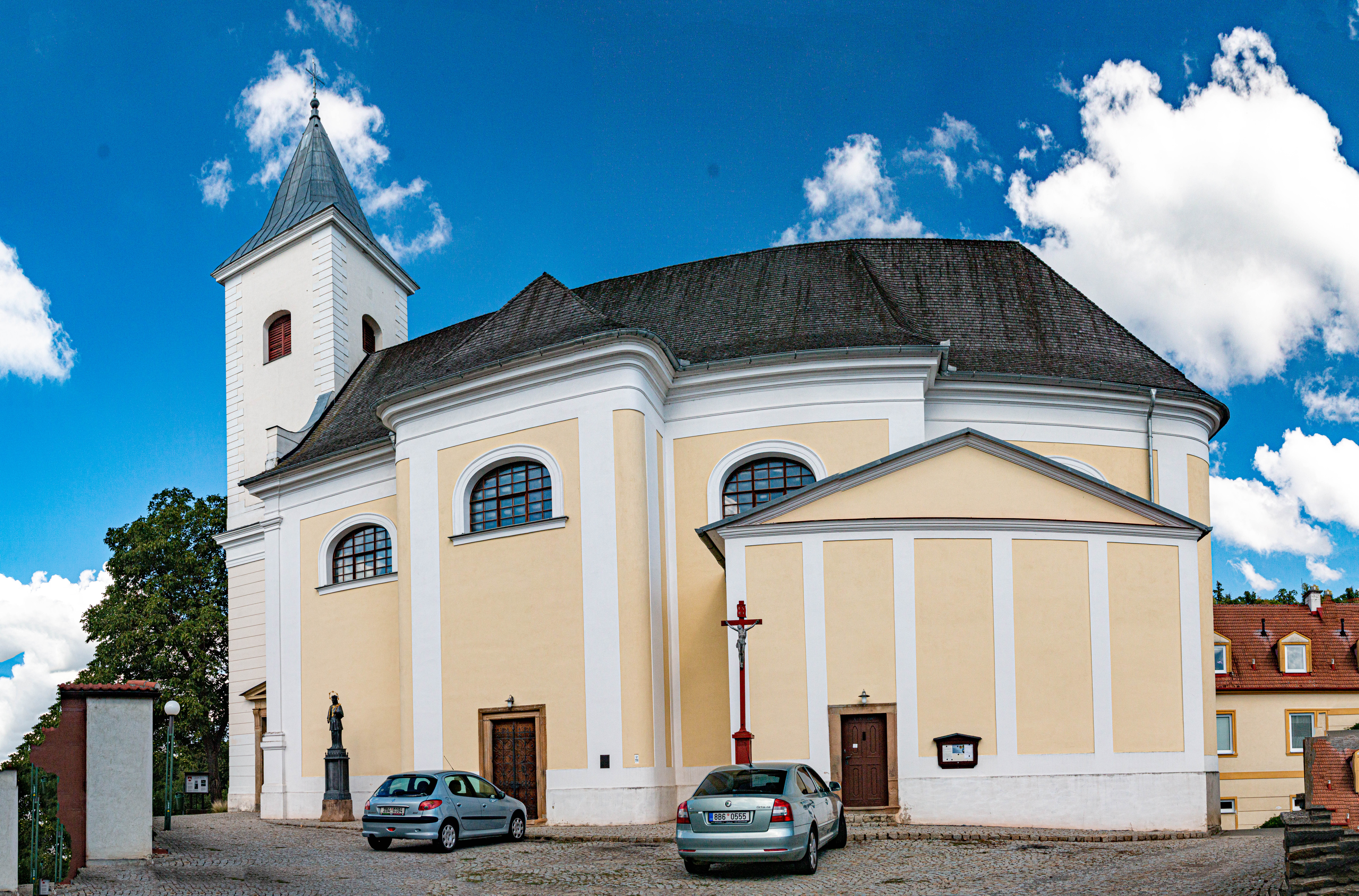
Church of Saint Lawrence

The main landmark of the market town is the Černá Hora Castle. The original Gothic castle was rebuilt in the Renaissance style in 1561. After it was destroyed by a fire in 1724, part of it was rebuilt in the Baroque style in 1830. After 1859, it was completely rebuilt in the pseudo-Renaissance style by the architect Theophil Hansen. In the same time, the castle park with alleys and exotic trees was founded. Since 1950, it houses a retirement home.

A Gothic church in Černá Hora was first documented in 1424, but it was destroyed during the Thirty Years' War. The current Church of Saint Lawrence was built in the Baroque style in 1707–1710. The tower was added in 1840.

== Notable people ==
- Leopold Löw (1811–1875), Hungarian rabbi
