= Sabre Springs, San Diego =

- Community of San Diego
- Sabre Springs
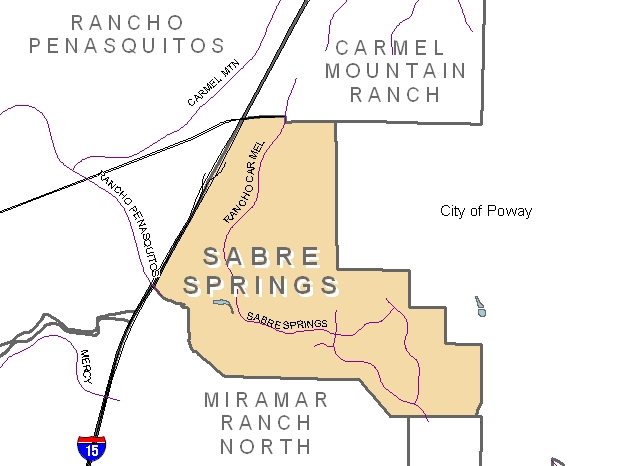
- Sabre Springs and neighborhood boundaries

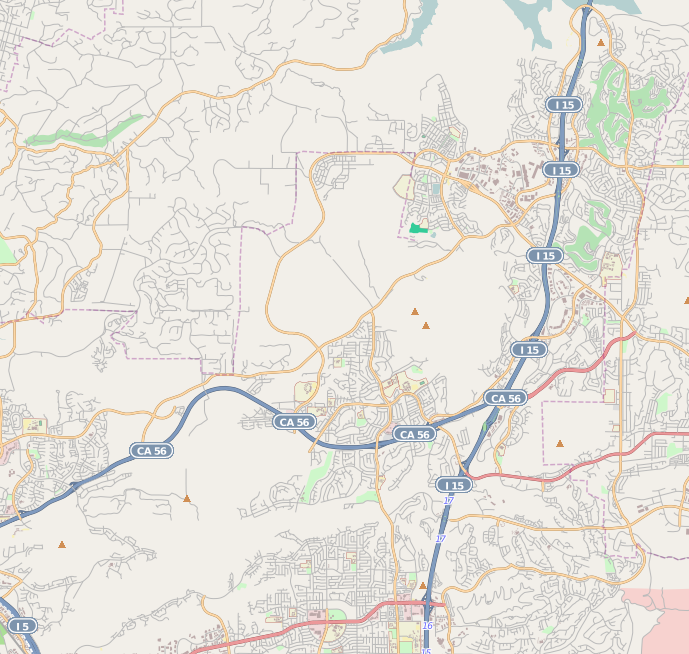
- Location within Northeastern San Diego Sabre Springs, San Diego (San Diego County, California)
- Coordinates: 32°57′07″N 117°05′49″W
- Country: United States of America
- State: California
- County: San Diego
- City: San Diego

Sabre Springs is a community in San Diego, California, located in the northeastern part of the city. It is bounded by the city limits of Poway on the east, Ted Williams Parkway on the north, Interstate 15 on the west, and the community of Miramar Ranch North to the south. Sabre Springs is bisected north-south by Poway Road.

The surrounding communities are Carmel Mountain to the north, Rancho Peñasquitos to the west, and Scripps Ranch to the south.

Sabre Springs also features a business park which includes several notable businesses such as General Atomics - Aeronautical (composite manufacturing facility), Bridgepoint Education and Hospira.

The telephone area code is 858, and the ZIP code is 92128.

== History ==
Three Native American cultural groups have occupied Sabre Springs in three different periods. The San Dieguito from 12,000 to 8,000 years ago, the La Jolla from 8,000 to 3,000 years ago, and the Northern Diegueno from 2,500 years ago to the Spanish period. Site surveys indicate two villages. One was located along Chicarita Creek, and the other along Peñasquitos Creek.

After the Spanish arrival, the area that became Sabre Springs was located near the two large ranches of Rancho Peñasquitos and Rancho Bernardo. The area was operated variously as cattle and sheep ranches by a series of owners in the 1800s and 1900s.

In the 1900s, a considerable portion of what is now Sabre Springs was owned by the family of swimmer Florence Chadwick. It was subsequently owned by the Sabre Petroleum Corporation. Until the 1980s, there was no substantial development of the land.

No plans to develop this area existed until the 1970s. In 1979, the City of San Diego formulated a growth management policy to guide development within the city. In 1982, the Sabre Springs Community Plan was adopted that laid out a largely residential community with industrial areas and large open spaces.

Pardee Homes began construction of the residential neighborhoods, the first of which opened in 1985. Residential construction continued throughout the 1990s, and Sabre Springs was largely built-out by 2010.

== Parks ==
Sabre Springs Park is located east of the intersection of Sabre Springs Parkway and Evening Creek Drive South. It features two tot-lots and two Little League fields.

South Creek Park is located on Wickerbay Cove and is next to Creekside Elementary School. It features a playground, Little League field, and direct access to the Peñasquitos Creek trail.

North of Ted Williams Parkway is the Carmel Mountain Ranch / Sabre Springs Recreation Center. This park is technically entirely within Carmel Mountain, despite sharing its name between both communities. It contains basketball courts, two baseball diamonds, and a playground.

Two trails run through Sabre Springs. One is located along Chicarita Creek between Evening Creek Drive and Sabre Springs Parkway. A second trail runs along Peñasquitos Creek between Springhurst Drive and Interstate 15. It is part of the Trans-County Trail corridor.

== Schools ==
Sabre Springs is served by the Poway Unified School District. The community hosts two elementary schools, but the middle school and high schools are located in neighboring communities.

=== Elementary schools ===
The following schools are located within Sabre Springs:

- Creekside Elementary School
  - Built in 2000
  - Mascot: Geckos
- Morning Creek Elementary School
  - Built in 1990
  - Mascot: Colts

=== Middle schools ===
- Meadowbrook Middle School
  - Built in 1964
  - Mascot: Mustangs

=== High schools ===
- Mount Carmel High School
  - Built in 1974
  - Mascot: Sundevils
- Rancho Bernardo High School
  - Built in 1990
  - Mascot: Broncos
  - Students in Sabre Springs attended Rancho Bernardo High School from September 1990 to August 2002.

== See also ==
- Rancho Santa Maria de Los Peñasquitos
- Ranchos of California
