= Carmel Mountain Ranch, San Diego =

- Community of San Diego
- Carmel Mountain Ranch
- Carmel Mountain Ranch's community entrance sign.

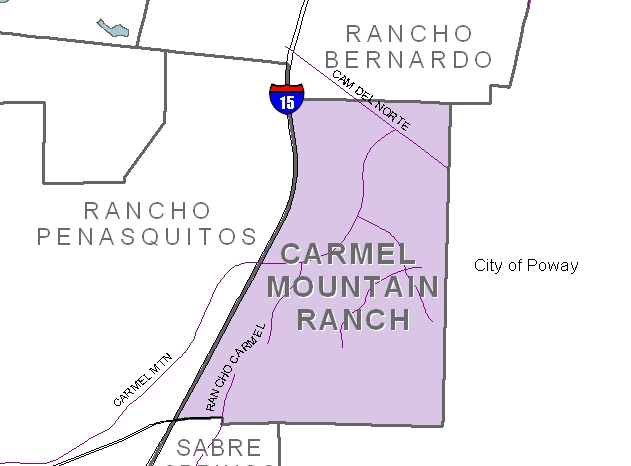
- Carmel Mountain Ranch and neighborhood boundaries

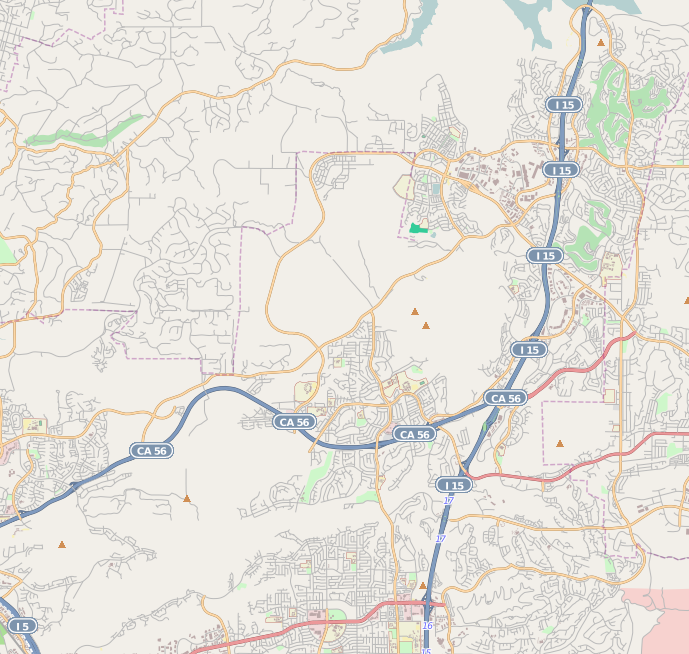
- Location within Northeastern San Diego Carmel Mountain Ranch, San Diego (San Diego County, California)
- Coordinates: 32°58′40.27″N 117°4′45.26″W
- Country: United States of America
- State: California
- County: San Diego
- City: San Diego

Carmel Mountain Ranch, sometimes shortened to simply Carmel Mountain, or abbreviated to CMR by local residents and organizations, is a community of San Diego, California, United States, in the northeastern part of the city. It lies in the shadow of Black Mountain at the eastern end of Carmel Mountain Road and State Route 56, where it ends and continues as Ted Williams Parkway, with Carmel Valley and Carmel Mountain Preserve around their western end.

== Geography ==
The community is bounded by the city of Poway to the east, and other communities of San Diego on all other sides: Rancho Bernardo to the north, Rancho Peñasquitos to the west, and Sabre Springs to the south.

== History ==
Carmel Mountain Ranch is a 1,489-acre community in the northeastern part of San Diego. It was originally home to the Kumeyaay people.

The name is derived from the Carmel Mountain mesa (now Carmel Mountain Preserve) in Carmel Valley, at the western end of the SR 56 corridor. It reached the inland area by way of Carmel Mountain Road, laid out as an east-west artery in the 1962 and 1970 master plans for Rancho Peñasquitos after developer Irvin Kahn acquired the 14,000-acre rancho in 1962.

The real development of the community began in the 1970s with early planning efforts such as the 1971 Carmel Mountain East Plan and the 1981 Rancho Carmel Community Plan. The 1971 plan contained about 6,200 homes but was never fully brought to life. The 1981 plan created a more balanced mix of residential, industrial, and commercial uses with approximately 7,185 homes and a higher employment base.

Following a change in ownership in 1983, Presley of San Diego, a division of the Presley Companies, revised the plan, and the City Council adopted it as the Carmel Mountain Ranch Community Plan on August 14, 1984, giving the community its current name.

Throughout the 1990s, Carmel Mountain Ranch continued to grow. Amendments in 1994 and 1999 adjusted the zoning to allow for a library, post office, and more park sites. By 1999, major infrastructure including Carmel Mountain Road, Ted Williams Parkway, and Camino del Norte were completed along with nearly 5,000 homes.

== Economy ==
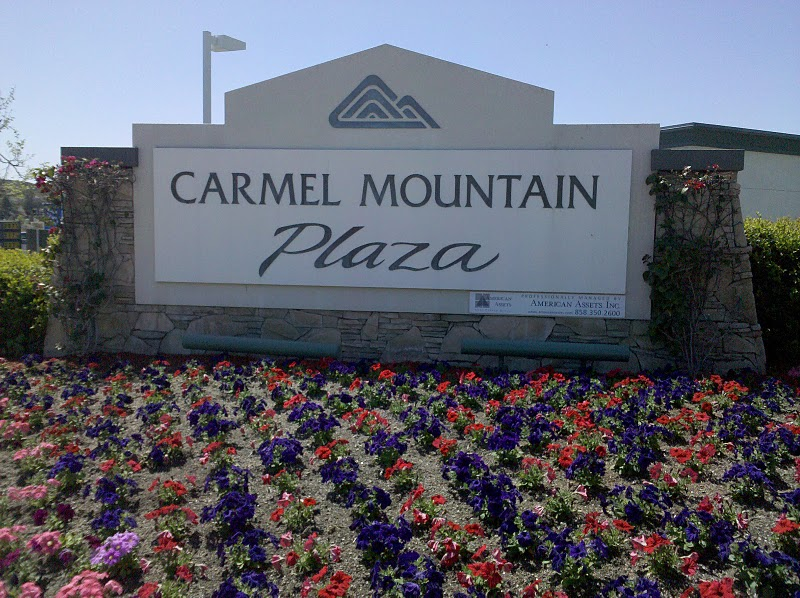
At Home (formerly Kmart, later Sears Essentials), Petco, and Best Buy are among the biggest retailers in this shopping center; however, there are dozens of others, and a directory can be viewed on the referenced website below. It is the largest in terms of area of the centers.

=== Retail ===
Several shopping centers are located adjacent to one another:

- Carmel Mountain Plaza
- Carmel Mountain Ranch Town Center
- Carmel Mountain Ranch Home Center
- Price Plaza (anchored by Costco Wholesale/opened as Price Club in 1992)
- The Courtyard at Carmel Mountain Ranch
- Rancho Carmel Plaza

=== Commercial ===
The Carmel Mountain Ranch/Rancho Bernardo submarket is the fifth-largest office space submarket in San Diego County, with over 6 million square feet of office space. It is part of an "I-15 edge city", edge city being a major center of employment outside a traditional downtown.

The Carvin Corporation is headquartered near these centers.

In 1993, the United States Postal Service opened the Margaret L. Sellers Processing and Distribution Center. The facility is over 15 acres and employs over 1,500 people. Sorting mail destined as far north as Fallbrook, and as far east as Tecate, during the holiday season the facility processes over 300 million items. It replaced the Midway Processing and Distribution Facility, in the Midway neighborhood, which opened in 1972 and stopped processing regional mail in 1993; that facility was built on the site of the Dutch Flats Airport, once utilized by Charles Lindbergh prior to his transatlantic flight.

== Transportation ==
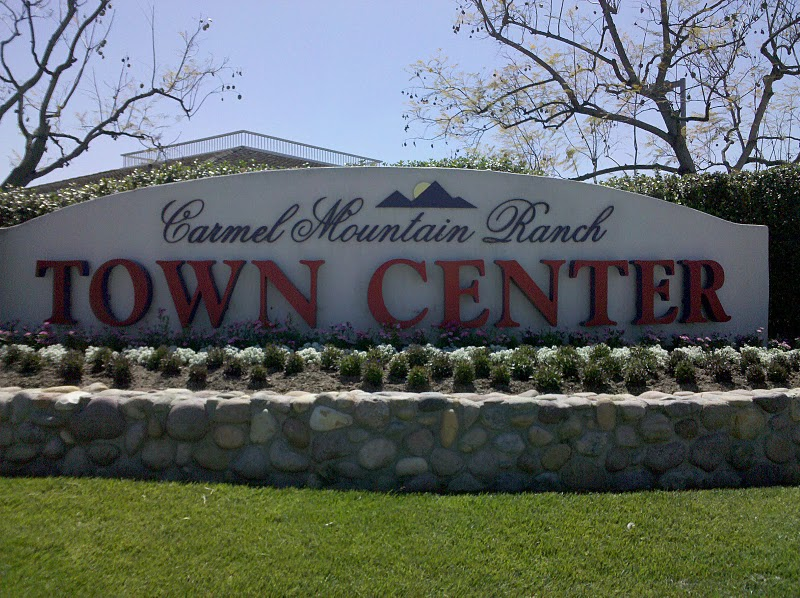
A Ralphs grocery store, banks, and retail shops are located here.

=== Thoroughfares ===
I-15 runs along the western edge of Carmel Mountain, and a noticeable stone marker, complete with sign and flags, is visible from the northbound lanes to act as a gateway immediately before the Carmel Mountain Road exit, which is the primary road serving the community. The eastern terminus of SR 56 becomes Ted Williams Parkway as it enters the community; however, it retains its freeway characteristics until it crosses Rancho Carmel Drive. Transportation access from the eastern end of SR 56, the Ted Williams Parkway and I-15 express lane exits make this community attractive to area commuters.

=== Public ===
There are local bus routes. While Carmel Mountain does not share in the name, the Sabre Springs / Penasquitos Transit Station, which provides direct access to the managed express lanes on I-15, is adjacent to the community.

== Community events ==
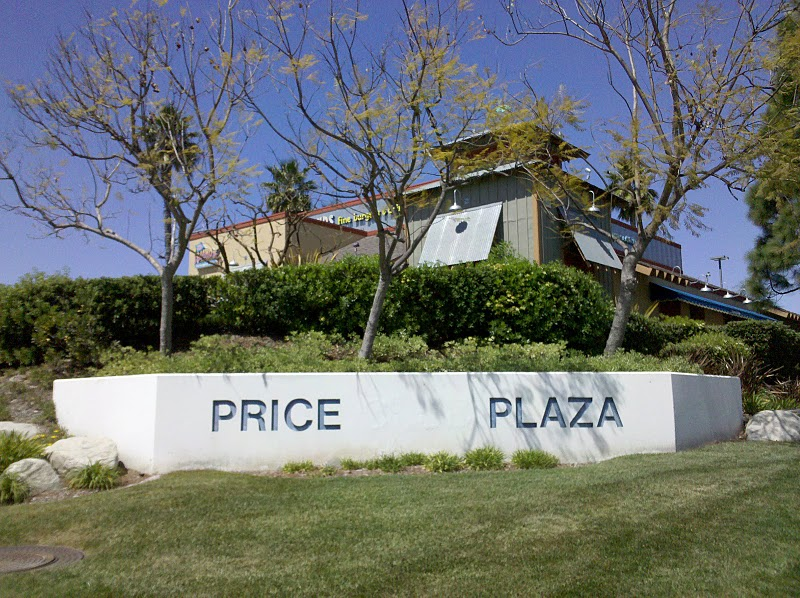
Costco Wholesale is the main anchor here; however, there are also smaller stores, such as eateries and a bank.

Every year the local Chamber of Commerce, headquartered within the community, hosts a fall festival at which local businesses, community organizations, and school representatives set up information booths and interact with attendees.

Fairway Village, a neighborhood division of Carmel Mountain Ranch running east-to-west on Stoney Gate Place, parallel to Ted Williams Parkway and crossed by Shoal Creek Drive, presents an annual Christmas light show called "Holiday Magic at Fairway Village." The neighborhood lights more than 85 homes from December 1 to January 1. Each year on the Saturday before Christmas, the neighborhood holds an evening block party that is open to the public, where visitors can walk through the neighborhood, enjoy the lights and festivities, and partake of snacks and hot drinks offered by many homes. This event has been featured in several San Diego Family magazine articles. The neighborhood is also very popular at Halloween due to it being a large cul-de-sac street with no hills.

== Parks and recreation ==
Carmel Mountain Ranch Community Park is located just north of Ted Williams Parkway on Rancho Carmel Drive, just east of the 15. Highland Ranch Park is located north of Eastbourne Road and slightly northeast of Highland Ranch Road.

The Carmel Mountain Ranch Country Club, a golf course in the community, closed on July 8, 2018, with the former owner citing rising water costs. Residents organized against redevelopment of the land, much of which was subsequently rebuilt as housing.

== Schools ==
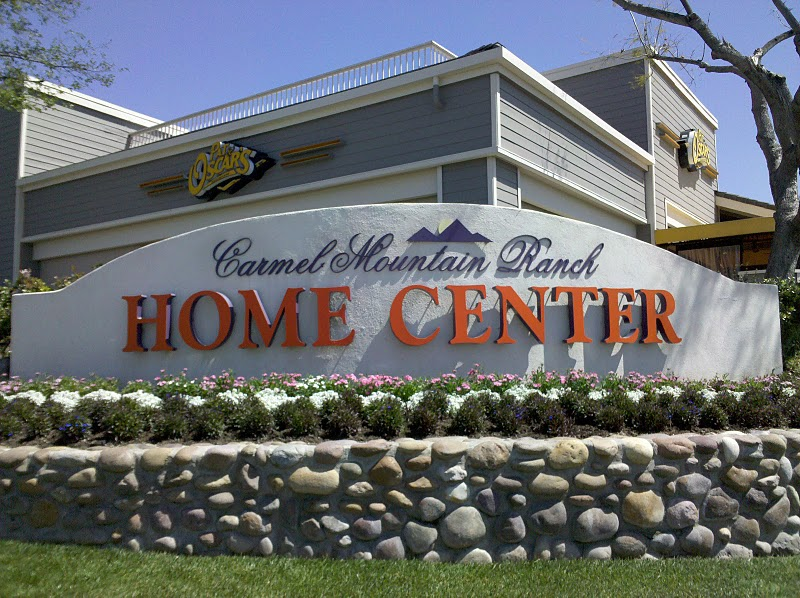
The Home Depot is the anchor of this center; however, there are multiple restaurants and smaller shops as well.

Carmel Mountain Ranch is served by the Poway Unified School District.

=== High schools ===
Middle school students at Carmel Mountain Ranch's three middle schools feed into Mt. Carmel High School, Poway High School, or Rancho Bernardo High School.

=== Middle schools ===
Elementary students feed into Bernardo Heights Middle School in Rancho Bernardo, Meadowbrook Middle School, or Black Mountain Middle School in Rancho Peñasquitos.

=== Elementary schools ===
- Highland Ranch Elementary
- Shoal Creek Elementary
- Creekside Elementary
- Morning Creek Elementary

== Sports ==
There is a baseball league for kindergarten - 8th grade. There are also a youth basketball league and other recreational sports.
