= 4S Ranch, California =

Unincorporated community in California, United States

4S Ranch
- Locale
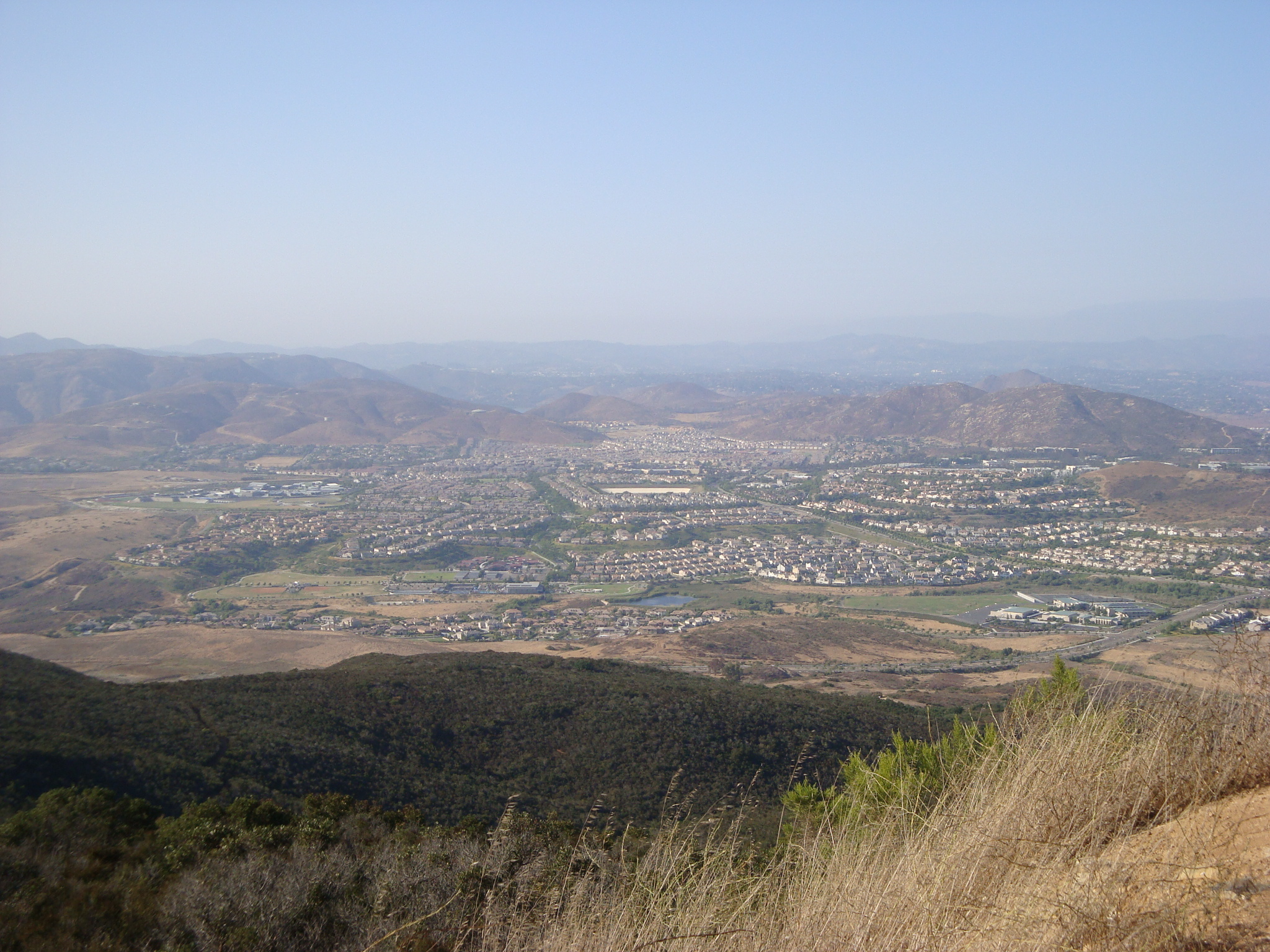
- 4S Ranch from the summit of Black Mountain

- Location within the state of California 4S Ranch (the United States)
- Coordinates: 33°1′3″N 117°6′42″W
- Country: United States
- State: California
- County: San Diego
- Time zone: UTC-8 (Pacific (PST))
  - Summer (DST): UTC-7 (PDT)
- ZIP codes: 92127
- Area code: 858

4S Ranch is an unincorporated, master-planned community in the North County area of San Diego County, California. It is located about 25 miles (40 km) north of downtown San Diego and 13 miles (21 km) east of the Pacific Ocean, just outside the incorporated city limits of San Diego.

The community spans about 2,900 acres of unincorporated San Diego County, bordering the San Diego communities of Rancho Bernardo to the east, Black Mountain Ranch to the west, and Rancho Peñasquitos to the south.

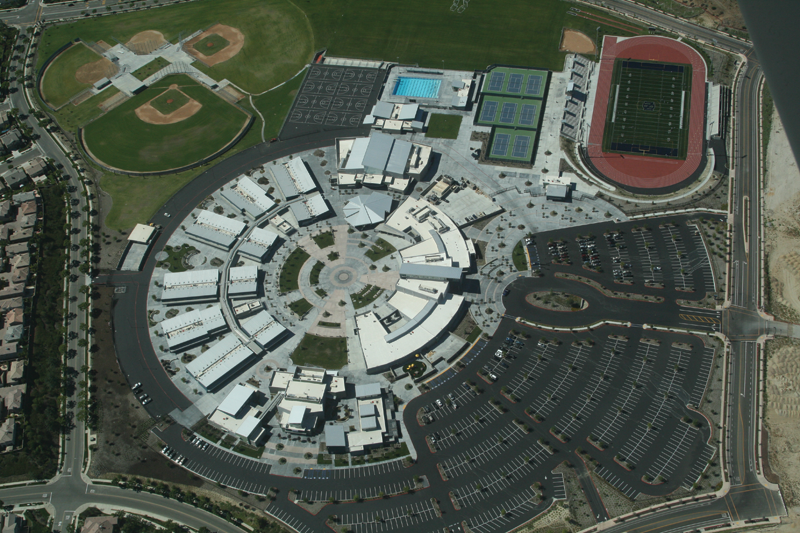
Aerial photo of Del Norte High School

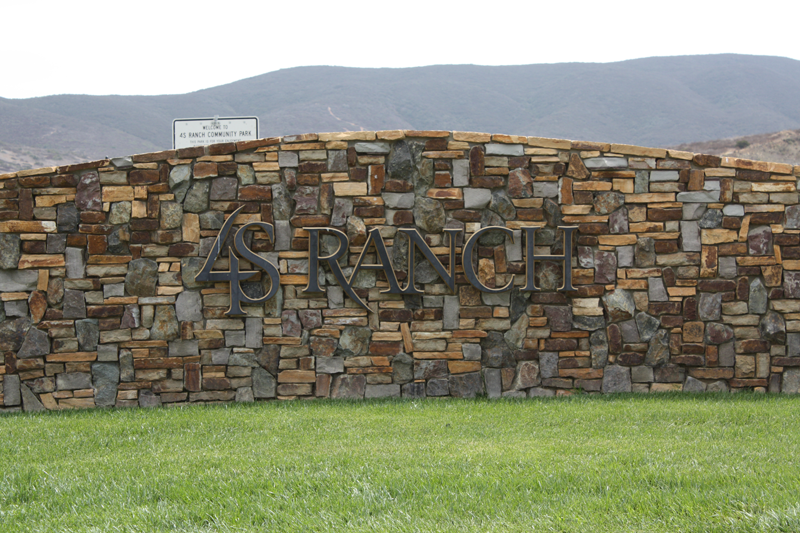
4S Ranch sign

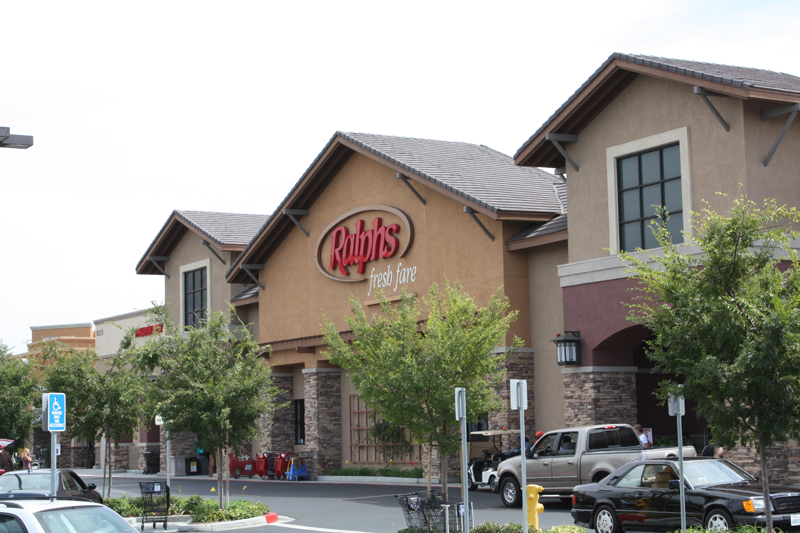
Ralphs in the 4S Commons shopping center

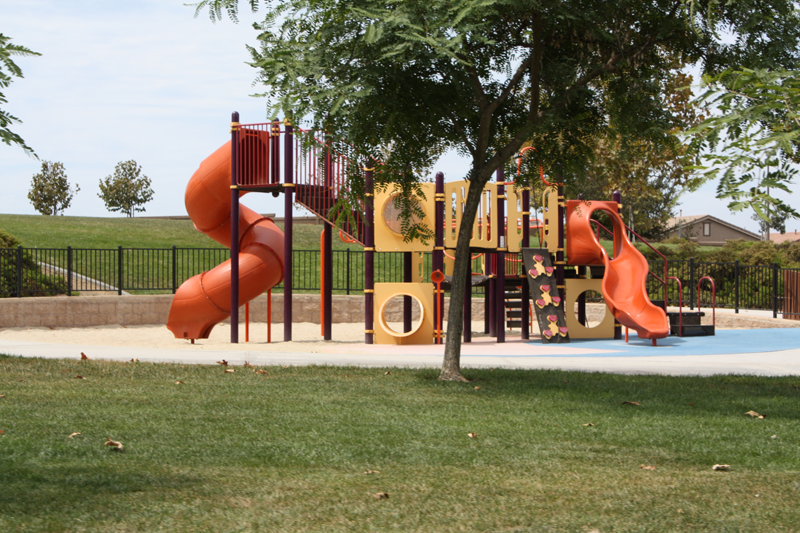
Heritage Park in 4S Ranch

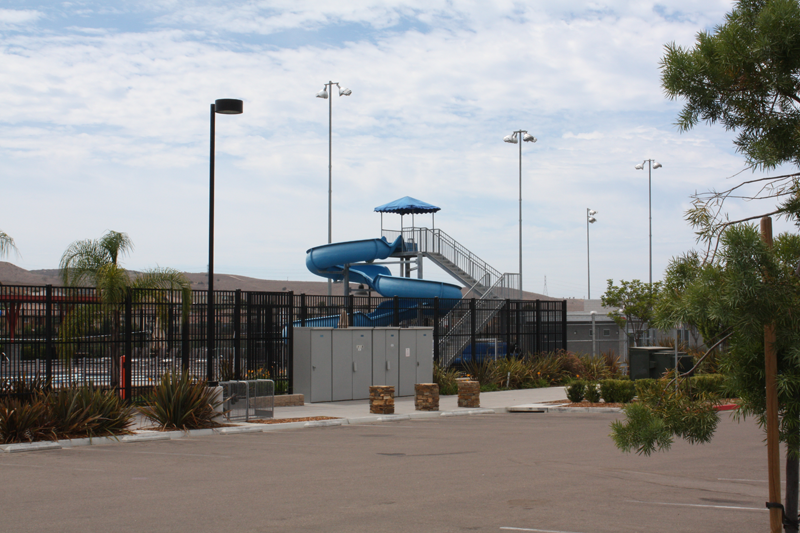
Boys and Girls Club in 4S Ranch

== History ==
The first recorded owner of Rancho San Bernardo, as the area in which 4S Ranch is currently situated, was English sea captain Joseph Snook "Captain Snook" (who later became a Mexican citizen and changed his name to Jose Francisco Snook), who acquired the land in 1842 and 1845 through grants from the Mexican Governor of California. After his death, Snook's heirs sold the property to James McCoy for $4,020.

Between 1847 and the turn of the century, the site of 4S Ranch was used extensively for the grazing of both sheep and longhorn cattle. By 1915 4S Ranch had been obtained by the San Dieguito Mutual Water Company, a subsidiary of Santa Fe Railroad. The railroad erroneously believed that eucalyptus trees would make excellent railroad ties and planted thousands of them. This was unsuccessful.

The San Diego Union of August 3, 1918 reported that W. J. Stowe of Los Angeles bought 3,000 acres of the ranch of the Eucalyptus Culture Company. On October 1, 1918, Stowe registered his 4S brand with San Diego County. The brand he chose represented the four Stowe family members living on the ranch.

4S Ranch was sold numerous times before being purchased by Albert E. Smith. In 1928, Albert Smith built the Spanish mission style house on a ridge overlooking Lake Hodges. This house remains today. Soon after, the property was acquired by William A. Clark, founder of the Los Angeles Philharmonic Orchestra. After Clark died in 1938, his widow sold 4S Ranch to Albert G. Ralphs of the Ralphs family, owners of the southern California grocery chain. 4S Ranch was primarily used by the Ralphs family for recreational and farming purposes until crop yields fell. Grass fires in 1944 and 1981 burned large portions of the original eucalyptus and citrus groves.

In the early 1980s, the Ralphs family agreed to develop the southern portion of their property (what is now the 4S Ranch master planned community by Newland Communities) and retain the northern 1,200 acres (4.9 km^{2}) as a family retreat which had been operated as a working ranch for 50 years. In the 1980s the third generation of the Ralphs family was granted stewardship of 4S Ranch. Albert's grandson and granddaughter Bob Ralphs and Linda Ralphs spearheaded the family's efforts to develop the property since 1979. They received approval in 1984 from the county to develop 634 acres (257 ha) of the property, with the rest set aside for development at least until after 1992. A portion of 4S Ranch was within a Williamson Act Agricultural Preserve until the contract expired at the end of 1992. The development plans began in general for a $100-million first phase of development at 4S Ranch business park component that totaled 180 acres (73 ha), enough for about 3 million square feet of research and light-industrial space.

Development began in 1987 that was primarily a business park. Housing development began in the early 2000s and was completed in 2014. At least 4,700 homes spread over 2,900 acres make up the community. Of the remaining 1,184 acres owned by the Ralphs family in the most northerly area of 4S Ranch, approximately 90 percent is designated natural open space with a potential 11 single family homes to be built on large estates accessible via Ralphs Ranch Road.

== Geography ==
4S Ranch is underlain by Jurassic Santiago Peak Volcanics, Tertiary Stadium conglomerate, and slope wash alluvium. The land of 4S Ranch before development consisted of a variety of landforms ranging from nearly flat-lying mesas and gently rolling hills to rugged, steeply-sloping hillside terrain. Elevations range from about 300 to 1,150 feet (91 to 351 m) above mean sea level. 1,600 acres (650 ha) of open space exceeded the mitigation requirement by 1,100 acres, and the loss of 3.8 acres of wetland habitat is mitigated by the creation of 9 acres of high quality wetland habitat.

== Retail ==
The 4S Ranch retail area surrounds the intersection of Dove Canyon and Camino del Norte and is composed of three main sections: the 4S Ranch Village Center, 4S Commons Town Center and the 4S Health Center. The 4S Ranch Village Center includes the area's only gas station, veterinary care, restaurants, salons, and a Starbucks. 4S Commons Town Center has two grocery stores, restaurants, shopping and services, such as dry cleaning and shipping. The 4S Health Center is home to a variety of medical specialties including family medicine, oncology, pediatric dentistry, women's health, oral surgery, and facial plastic surgery.

== Transportation ==
Route 880 (4S Ranch Express) debuted on March 30, 2009, providing service to Sorrento Valley/UTC During peak commute times via MTS. The premium express service is a commuter service with limited stops by premium coach buses with service to Sorrento Valley and University Town Center transit center. In 2014, Route 880 and all bus service to the 4S Ranch area had been cancelled. Service to Sorrento Valley has been replaced by Route 270 out of the Rancho Bernardo transit center. The station is a 30-minute walk or a 15-minute bike ride.

Camino del Norte and Rancho Bernardo Road provide the primary access for the community, and lead east to Interstate 15. Other major roads providing access to 4S Ranch are Camino del Sur and Carmel Valley Road, which both lead to the south and west and lead to California State Route 56 and Interstate 5, respectively.

== Community events ==
- Fall Festival includes merchants with food, rides and games
- Annual Easter Egg Hunt
- Thank You Run/Walk 5K/10K Thanksgiving Day
- Summer Movie Nights
- 4S Ranch Fourth of July Carnival and Street Faire Activities
- 4S Ranch Fourth of July Fireworks Fireworks at Del Norte High School
- 4S Ranch Pumpkin Festival
- Concerts in the Park

== Parks and recreation ==
There are several county parks including

- 4S Ranch Sports Park
- Heritage Park
- 4S Ranch Community Park
- Patriot Park
- Pioneer Park
- Liberty Park
- Homestead Park

== Schools ==
4S Ranch is served by numerous schools within the Poway Unified School District that opened beginning in 2004 when Stone Ranch Elementary opened and culminated with the opening of Design 39 Campus in August 2014.

=== High schools ===
- Del Norte High School

=== Middle schools ===
- Oak Valley Middle School

=== Elementary schools ===
- Stone Ranch Elementary School
- Monterey Ridge Elementary School
- Del Sur Elementary School

=== K-8 schools ===
- Design 39 Campus

=== Private schools ===
- Maranatha Christian Schools

== Law enforcement and fire protection ==
4S Ranch is served by the San Diego County Sheriff's Office, with a substation located at 10282 Rancho Bernardo Road. Fire services are provided by the Rancho Santa Fe Fire Department, with a station located at 16930 Four Gee Road. Traffic related crimes and incidents are handled by the California Highway Patrol out of the San Diego Area Office due to the community being unincorporated.

== Community organizations ==
=== Youth sports ===
- 4S Ranch Youth Football & Cheer
- 4S Ranch Little League Baseball
- Boys & Girls Club 4S Ranch Basketball, Volleyball, Community Pool, Camps
- 4S Ranch Soccer
- Arsenal FC San Diego
- 4S Ranch Girls Softball

=== Religious services ===
- GC2 Church
- Maranatha Chapel
- The City Church
- Restoration Church

=== Charitable organizations ===
- 4S Ranch~Del Sur Community Foundation

== Library ==
The 4S Ranch branch of the San Diego County Library opened to the public on April 26, 2007. The 4S Ranch Library is located in 4S Commons Center and serves as a community hub, focused on their large population of children and teens. The 4S Ranch branch is 7,214 square feet and has a fluctuating collection size of around 28,000 items.
