= Fairway Village =

- Community of San Diego
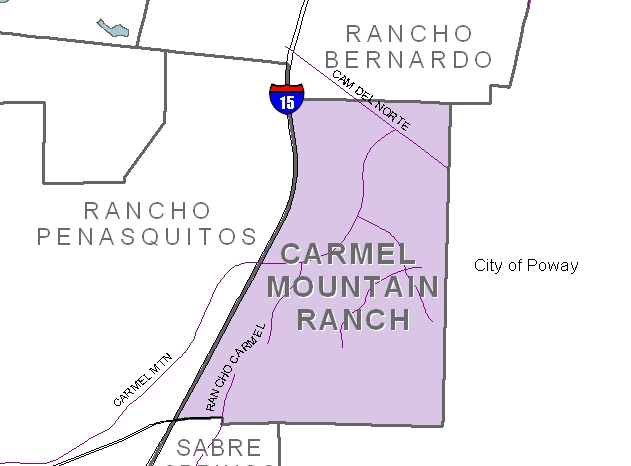
- Carmel Mountain Ranch and neighborhood boundaries

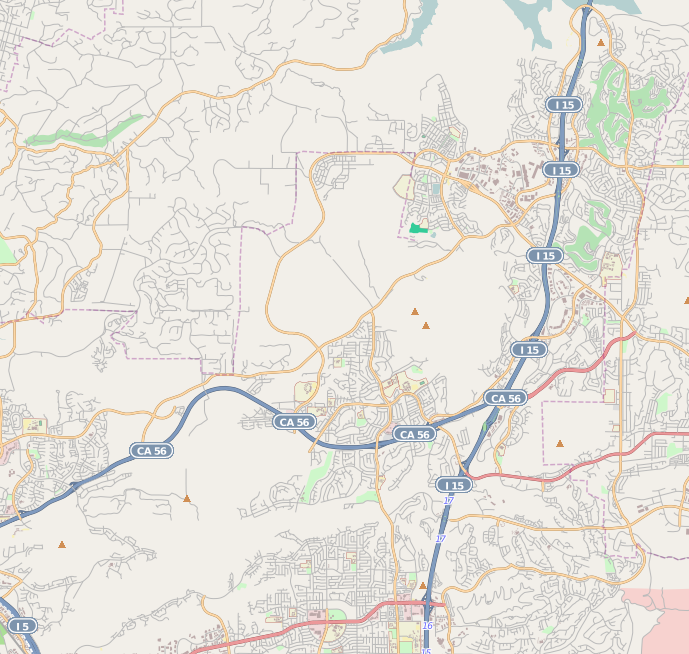
- Location within Northeastern San Diego Fairway Village (San Diego County, California)
- Coordinates: 32°58′40.27″N 117°4′45.26″W
- Country: United States of America
- State: California
- County: San Diego
- City: San Diego

Fairway Village is a neighborhood division of Carmel Mountain Ranch, located along Stoney Gate Place, parallel to Ted Williams Parkway and crossed by Shoal Creek Drive, in San Diego, California.

== Geography ==
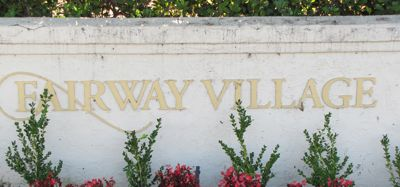

The neighborhood is entirely residential (no commercial buildings) and consists of one street (Stoney Gate Place) running east-to-west, and crossed in the middle by Shoal Creek Drive. It is one of several neighborhoods that make up the greater Carmel Mountain Ranch community. It generally parallels the Carmel Mountain Ranch Golf Course from holes 4 to 7.

There are approximately 70 homes on the west end, which is completely flat, and 60 homes on the east end, which has a slight incline.

== Community events ==
The neighborhood presents an annual Christmas light show called "Holiday Magic at Fairway Village." The neighborhood lights 85+ homes from December 1 to January 1. Each year on the Saturday before Christmas, the neighborhood holds an evening block party that is open to the public, where visitors can walk the neighborhood, enjoy the lights and festivities, and partake of snacks and hot drinks offered by many homes. This event has been featured in several San Diego Family magazine articles. The neighborhood is also very popular at Halloween due to it being a large cul-de-sac street with no hills.

== Parks and recreation ==
Carmel Mountain Ranch Community Park is located just north of Ted Williams Parkway on Rancho Carmel Drive, just east of the 15, and is the closest park to Fairway Village.

The Carmel Mountain Ranch Country Club sprawls much of the community and is available for golf tournaments, weddings, and other events.

== Schools ==
The schools of Fairway Village are all within the Poway Unified School District.

=== High schools ===
High school students feed into Rancho Bernardo High School.

=== Middle schools ===
Middle school students feed into Meadowbrook Middle School.

=== Elementary schools ===
Elementary school students attend Shoal Creek Elementary School
