= Halfaker =

Halfaker is a surname. Notable people with the surname include:

- Aaron Halfaker (born 1983), American computer scientist
- Frances Dawn Halfaker (born 1979), American veteran, veterans' advocate, entrepreneur, and philanthropist
