= California State Route 56 =

East–west state highway in the U.S. state of California

State Route 56
- Ted Williams Freeway
- State Route 56 highlighted in red

Route information
- Maintained by Caltrans
- Length: 9.210 mi (14.822 km)
- Existed: 1964–present

Major junctions
- West end: I-5 in Carmel Valley, San Diego
- East end: I-15 in Rancho Peñasquitos, San Diego

Location
- Country: United States
- State: California
- Counties: San Diego

Highway system
- State highways in California; Interstate; US; State; Scenic; History; Pre‑1964; Unconstructed; Deleted; Freeways
← SR 55	→ SR 57

State Route 56 (SR 56) is an east–west state highway in the U.S. state of California. It runs 9.210 miles (14.822 km) from Interstate 5 (I-5) in the Carmel Valley neighborhood of San Diego to I-15. The eastern terminus of the highway is also the western end of the Ted Williams Parkway, which continues to Poway through Carmel Mountain Ranch. SR 56 serves as an important connector between I-5 and I-15, being the only east–west freeway between SR 78 in north San Diego County, several miles away, and SR 52 near Marine Corps Air Station Miramar. It is also named the Ted Williams Freeway, after the San Diego-born baseball player.

SR 56 was added to the state highway system in 1959 as Legislative Route 278, and was renumbered SR 56 in the 1964 state highway renumbering. Plans in 1964 were to connect SR 56 to the north end of SR 125 and continue east to SR 67, but these plans did not come to fruition. The eastern end from Black Mountain Road to I-15 was completed in 1993; the western end from I-5 to Carmel Creek Road was completed in 1995 after several lawsuits filed by the Sierra Club and other community groups. The two ends were not connected until the middle portion of the freeway was completed in 2004. The delay was largely due to funding issues and environmental concerns.

== Route description ==
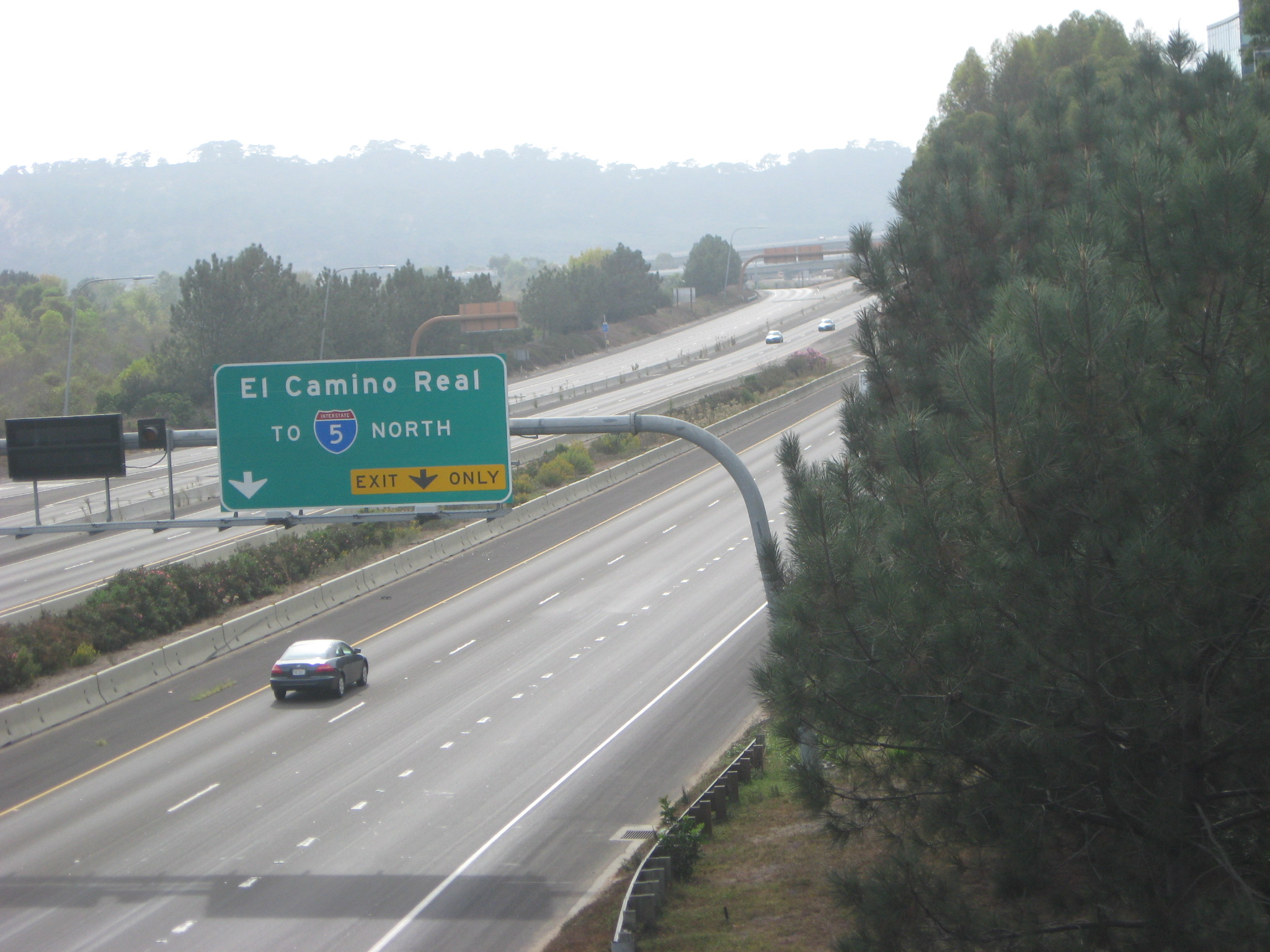
SR 56 west at the Carmel Creek Road interchange

Route 56 is defined in section 356 of the California Streets and Highways Code, and that the highway is "from Route 5 north of La Jolla to Route 67". The highway is not fully constructed to extend east to Route 67 as it is defined.

Eastbound SR 56 begins as a ramp from the northbound I-5's local bypass lanes. The interchange is not complete; southbound I-5 traffic must exit to Carmel Valley Road before entering SR 56. Westbound traffic on SR 56 merges into the southbound I-5 local bypass lanes, which provide access to I-805. Continuing east, the route then has an interchange at Carmel Creek Road, which provides access to the nearby San Diego Jewish Academy, and proceeds eastward through a residential area. After passing milepost 2, the freeway has another interchange with Carmel Country Road south of the community of Torrey Hills.

SR 56 meets Carmel Valley Road and curves northward, passing Canyon Crest Academy before turning southeastward. The route passes over McGonigle Creek before intersecting Camino Del Sur, which serves the nearby Westview High School. Southeast of Camino Del Sur, SR 56 curves back east, passing under Carmel Mountain Road without an exit. The route encounters exits with Black Mountain Road and Rancho Peñasquitos Boulevard in Rancho Peñasquitos in a primarily residential area before meeting its terminus at a partial cloverleaf interchange with I-15. Past the bridge over I-15, the road continues as Ted Williams Parkway, ending at Twin Peaks Road in Poway.

SR 56 is part of the California Freeway and Expressway System; and is part of the National Highway System, a network of highways that are considered essential to the country's economy, defense, and mobility by the Federal Highway Administration. In 2014, SR 56 had an annual average daily traffic (AADT) of 32,000 vehicles between I-15 and the eastern terminus at Ted Williams Parkway, and 81,000 vehicles between Carmel Creek Road and Carmel Country Road, the latter of which was the highest AADT for the freeway.

== History ==
=== Planning and initial construction ===
Planning for SR 56 started in 1956, according to San Diego Councilwoman Barbara Warden. The route was first added to the California State Highway System in 1959 as Legislative Route Number 278 (LRN 278). The routing ran from LRN 2, which later became US 101, all the way east to LRN 198, which is now SR 67. In the 1964 state highway renumbering, LRN 278 was renumbered SR 56 and was designated to run from I-5 to SR 67. On December 30, 1980, the City of Poway included SR 56 in their city plan extending all the way east through the city to a northern extension of SR 125. In 1983, both the cities of San Diego and Poway supported the extension of SR 56 all the way to SR 67, although Poway wanted the route moved and had reservations about the freeway ending in their city. Nevertheless, as of 2014 there are no plans to construct the portion of SR 56 east of I-15; several arterial roads connect the eastern end of the SR 56 freeway with SR 67, including Ted Williams Parkway, Twin Peaks Road, Espola Road (CR S5), and Poway Road (CR S4). Ted Williams Parkway itself was built by the City of San Diego as a primary arterial along the corridor and road profile Caltrans had proposed for SR 56, and was completed into Poway in 1998.

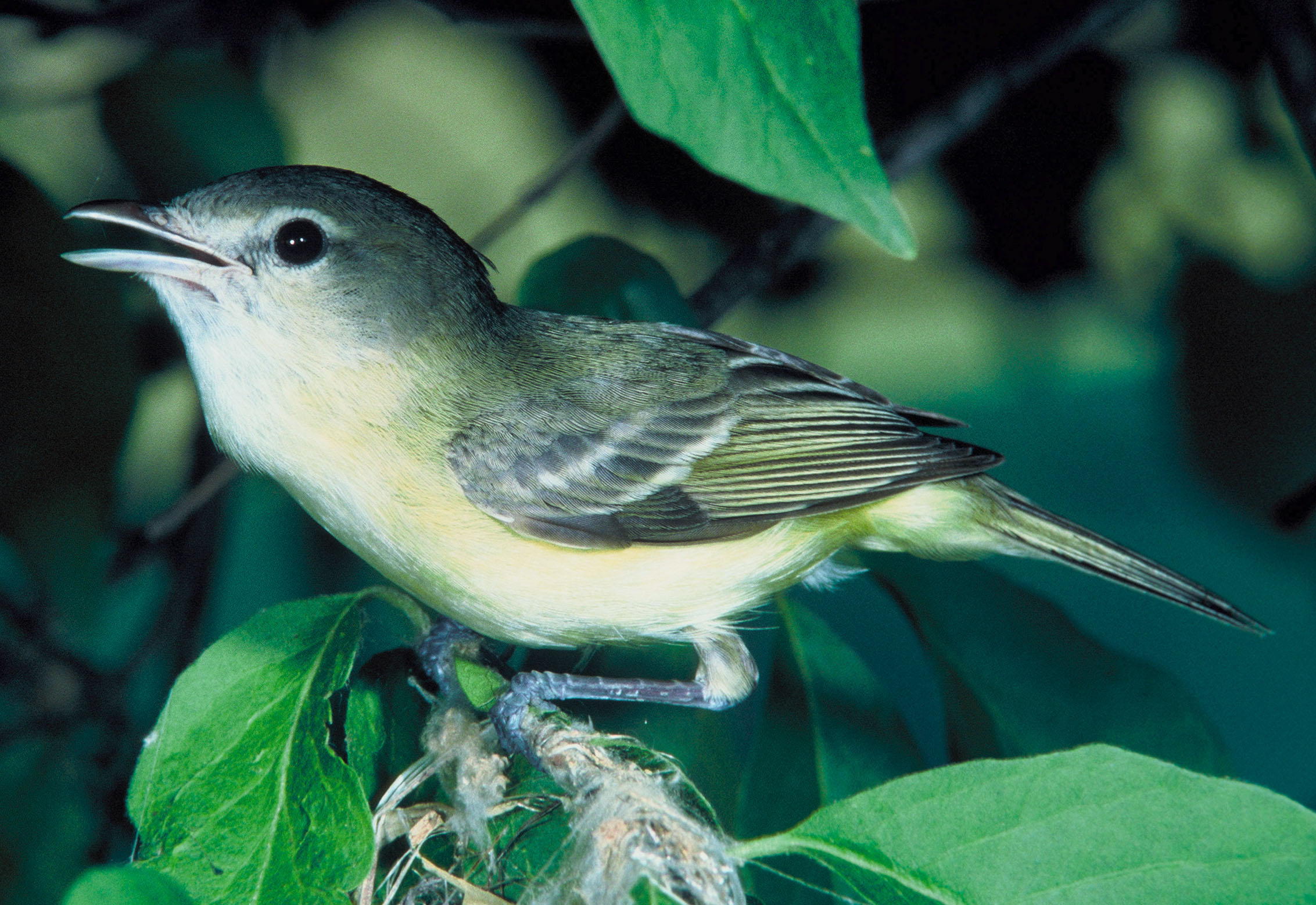
A Bell's vireo, of which the least Bell's vireo is a subspecies

Citizens began to lobby for the construction of SR 56 in 1986, in a similar action to efforts for SR 52. As far back as 1987, the Sierra Club opposed the use of sales tax revenue to build the freeway because of environmental concerns. A public forum was held on April 10, 1990, in Rancho Peñasquitos. Since funds were not available for constructing the middle of the route, many opposed the construction of the eastern part of SR 56 as a "road to nowhere". Opposition to the western end of the freeway related to concerns about destruction of "farmland, marshland, and willow scrubland", the habitat of the endangered least Bell's vireo. The San Diego City Council voted against such widening of Carmel Valley Road on April 12, citing the environmental concerns. Caltrans rejected other routes, and insisted on ending the freeway at I-5 and Carmel Valley Road. The council reversed its decision on May 8; after the public gave several opinions on the matter, Caltrans agreed to set aside 69 acres (28 ha) for environmental mitigation, and $2 million (about $4.23 million in 2024 dollars) was to be set aside for the purchase of land for a park near the San Dieguito River.

In June 1990, the Del Mar Terrace Conservancy and the Carmel Valley Coalition sued the San Diego City Council to require them to move the western terminus of SR 56 closer to Sorrento Valley. On August 1, the City of San Diego received a petition in which more than 45,000 people requested that the City Council overturn their decision or refer it to a public referendum. The City Council backed down and rescinded the appropriate zoning changes on August 7, in efforts to keep the city from having to run a special election. They also approved the plans for the eastern portion between Black Mountain Road and I-15. Meanwhile, the Carmel Valley Coalition sued the city as well. The California Coastal Commission approved the construction on September 13, and several local residents representing both sides of the debate attended the meeting in Marina del Rey.

Construction on the predecessor of SR 56 began on November 16, 1987, the Newland-California Company paying for the work as a local developer. Around 1990, the North City Parkway was completed as a two-lane road between Rancho Peñasquitos Boulevard (then Peñasquitos Boulevard) and I-15, along the proposed route of SR 56. The first official segment of the freeway from Black Mountain Road to I-15 was constructed next, beginning on July 25, 1991 by Daley Corporation and W.R. Connelly Inc. This was scheduled to open in May 1993, at a cost of $13 million (about $26.6 million in 2024 dollars).

Opposition to the western segment (from I-5 to Carmel Valley Road) persisted. By 1991, the Del Mar Terrace Conservancy filed an appeal with the 4th District Court of Appeals after losing the lawsuit to the city of San Diego and Caltrans. The Sierra Club had also sued the California Coastal Commission. On July 16, 1992, the Sierra Club withdrew its lawsuit after the City of San Diego agreed to work to keep the Peñasquitos Lagoon flowing to the ocean and to restore a wetland area. Following the Sierra Club's settlement, the City of Del Mar raised an objection to the club's decision to accept a settlement, since the city had given a $7,000 contribution (about $14,000 in 2024 dollars) to the case. The Sierra Club agreed to return the money in August 1992.

The Del Mar Conservancy suit continued, and the plaintiffs requested a court order to stop construction. This lawsuit claimed that the state and city had not done enough environmental studies and mitigation. The 4th District Court of Appeals denied an appeal on October 23. In 1993, citizens complained that funds were being diverted from a recreational park to build the freeway, possibly hindering the development of a new elementary school. The segment was finally completed at a projected cost of $27.2 million (about $53.2 million in 2024 dollars), opening to traffic by 1995. The ramps connecting SR 56 to I-5 were opened between 1997 and 1998; traffic was diverted onto Carmel Valley Road in the meantime.

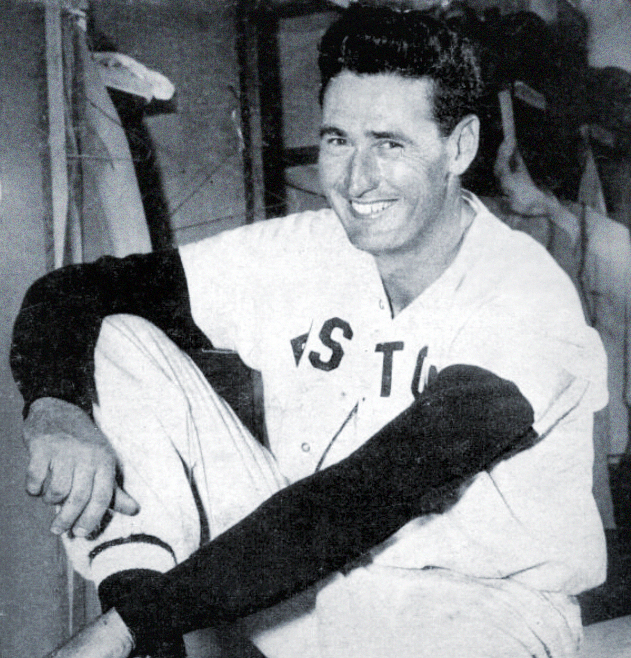
Williams in 1949, soon after leaving San Diego for Boston

The freeway is named after Ted Williams, a Hall of Fame baseball player born in San Diego who played for the Boston Red Sox during his 21-year career. The San Diego City Council also considered naming SR 56 after the former governor and San Diego mayor Pete Wilson. The Council voted 7-1 to name it after Williams on May 12, 1992. Since Williams was still alive, the State of California had to approve the name. Lionel Van Deerlin alleged that Councilwoman Abbe Wolfsheimer nominated Wilson for the honor as political ammunition against Councilman Ron Roberts. Williams came to Mt. Carmel High School on July 12, 1992, for the freeway dedication. Kevin McNamara, who had worked with the government to get the name approved despite opposition, was charged $15,000 (about $30,000 in 2024 dollars) for the highway signs when the name was official. The freeway was officially named after Ted Williams in 1993 by the Legislature.

=== Filling the gap ===
A 5.5-mile (8.9 km) gap in the freeway remained, nevertheless. Concerns about the missing funds for the freeway date back to 1990. Since the proposed route passed through the open area between Carmel Valley and Rancho Peñasquitos, revenue from the Proposition A sales tax hike could not be used. In 1993, a "Citizens United for State Route 56" group was commissioned to work on the funding issues. Two years later, County Supervisor Pam Slater briefly proposed making SR 56 a toll road in order to raise funds for construction. The city of San Diego agreed to pay $25 million (about $46.9 million in 2024 dollars), and the state indicated that it would contribute $20 million.

Highway 680 was a planned county route that would have run from Encinitas to Rancho Bernardo. The San Diego County Board of Supervisors cancelled the plans in February 1994, respecting the wishes of the city of Encinitas. There were concerns that some of the traffic from this proposed route would now travel on SR 56 instead. On May 17, 1994, $20 million (about $38.3 million in 2024 dollars) allocated to Highway 680 was given to the SR 56 project.

In January 1998, the State Transportation Improvement Program approved a $245 million allocation (about $439 million in 2024 dollars) for the expansion, and hopes were to finish construction by 2000, with traffic projected to decrease by 20 percent on I-15. There were environmental concerns that fostered consideration of four northern alternatives. One of them was chosen in June 1998 by the San Diego City Council, amid concerns that by moving the route away from "environmentally sensitive canyons", the freeway would be closer to residences. Some of those living in Rancho Glens Estates sued the city over these concerns in August.

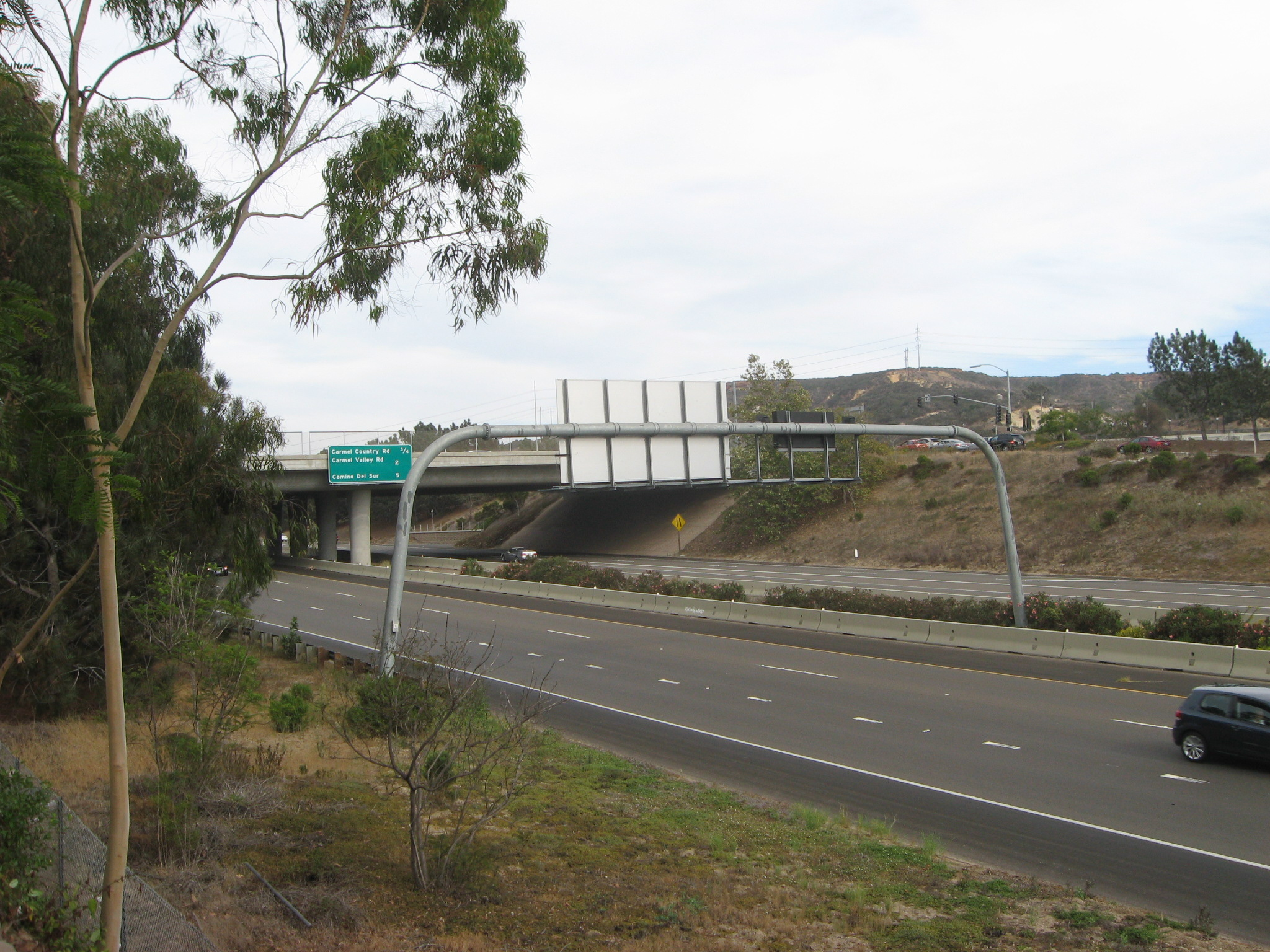
SR 56 east at Carmel Creek Road; the exits on the sign were constructed with the missing portion of the freeway that was completed in 2004.

Construction began on the missing portion of SR 56 on October 21, 1999, amid allegations of a missing Army Corps of Engineers permit, at an estimated cost of $111 million (about $196 million in 2024 dollars). The California Coastal Commission approved the extension on May 10, 2000, after residents lost two lawsuits relating to the proximity of the freeway. Caltrans was required to install a drainage system because of the wetlands; this requirement was similar to a court ruling for a project in the Bolsa Chica Ecological Reserve. At this time, the completion was estimated to occur in 2004, at a cost of $151 million (about $261 million in 2024 dollars). In October 2000, Carmel Valley Road was extended to Black Mountain Road, providing a paved alternative until SR 56 was completed; commuters had to travel on a 2.2-mile (3.5 km) unpaved road, one of the only roads between I-5 and I-15 in North County.

Local developers contributed $21 million (about $35.4 million in 2024 dollars) for the construction of the interchange at Camino Ruiz, and construction began on July 11, 2001. An open house was held on the 1.5-mile (2.4 km) portion of the freeway between the Camino Ruiz (renamed Camino del Sur) interchange and the Black Mountain Road interchange on April 5, 2003. The road was scheduled to open on April 12, 2003, and was projected to decrease the traffic on city streets coming from the extended Carmel Valley Road.

The city of San Diego constructed SR 56 from Black Mountain Road to Carmel Mountain Road, and Caltrans built the remaining portion of the route to Carmel Creek Road. The bridges were still under construction in November 2000 on the city portion. San Diego mayor Dick Murphy commissioned the San Diego Freeway Congestion Strike Team to attempt to accelerate stalled freeway projects such as SR 56 in 2001. In May 2001, the City Council allocated another $5.1 million (about $8.6 million in 2024 dollars) to purchase land to build the freeway. Critics stated that the construction of SR 56 was a short-term solution, and that traffic would return by 2020.

FCI Constructors Inc. and W.R. Connelly Inc. won the contract for the Caltrans portion of the new freeway at a bid of $50.2 million (about $83.4 million in 2024 dollars), with completion scheduled for 2004. The freeway was built with two lanes in each direction, additional land being available to expand to three lanes if necessary. The project continued on schedule through the 2003 California budget crisis, receiving $4.3 million from the state in 2003. In 2004, there were citizen complaints about the lack of a sound wall to reduce the freeway noise in private residences. It took until July 19, 2004, to join the west and east ends of the freeway; a public festival was held on the freeway on July 17. The cost of completing the middle 5.5-mile (8.9 km) segment was reported at $220 million in 2004 (about $349 million in 2024 dollars). Citizens complained in 2008 that the bike path along SR 56 was difficult to access from the northern side of the interchange with El Camino Real; however, funding issues prevented the construction of a paved path at the time.

=== Ramps and bypasses ===
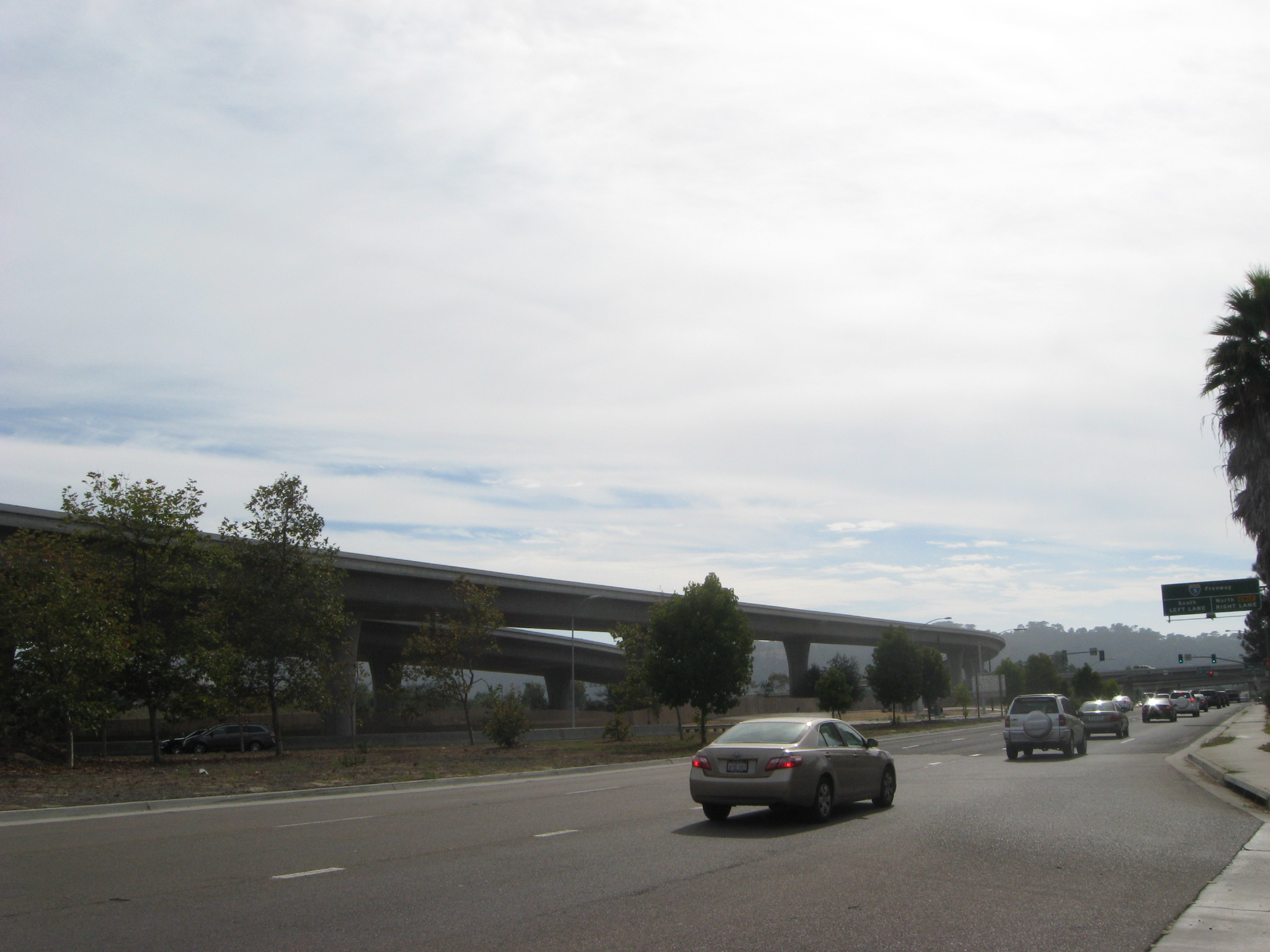
SR 56 ramps to I-5

The construction of a "dual freeway" at the western end was scheduled to begin in early 2002, referring to the two carriageways needed for each direction of the freeway. It would require drivers to use the new local lanes to access eastbound SR 56 from I-5 or I-805. The project would allow for trucks to use the new lanes to assist in merging with traffic. The northbound lanes were scheduled to open in February 2006. The southbound I-15 to westbound SR 56 ramp was improved in a construction project in 2005.

Concerns about the lack of a ramp from westbound SR 56 to northbound I-5 date back from 1988, because of a projected increase of traffic on local Carmel Valley streets. Planning for the missing ramps at the western end of SR 56 was underway in 2008, despite nearby homeowner opposition. Caltrans agreed not to destroy homes in late June 2008, but concerns about noise and funding remained. On June 13, 2012, Caltrans held a public forum to discuss five proposals to address the missing ramps at the western terminus:

- build the westbound to northbound ramp and the southbound to eastbound ramp,
- add additional lanes to both SR 56 and I-5,
- only build the westbound-to-northbound ramp and add lanes to southbound I-5 and eastbound SR 56,
- build the westbound-to-northbound ramp and add lanes on SR 56 only, or
- build nothing at all.

A final environmental document was scheduled to be released in the middle of 2016. In the meantime, Caltrans began studies relating to widening the route to three lanes in each direction, as called for by the 2050 regional plan; by late 2022, plans had been developed to add high-occupancy vehicle lanes between El Camino Real and Carmel Valley Road. On April 24, 2023, the San Diego City Council voted unanimously to allocate $22.5 million and approve the construction of HOV lanes. The HOV lanes were constructed for both directions of SR 56 between El Camino Real and Carmel Valley Road and were opened to traffic in July 2025. Caltrans completed the final environmental document in 2017, selecting a phased plan in which the HOV lanes were the first phase. A direct connector from westbound SR 56 to northbound I-5 is planned as a second phase but remains unfunded.

== Exit list ==
The entire route is in San Diego, San Diego County.

mi	km	Exit	Destinations	Notes
0.00	0.00	1A	I-5 south	Western terminus; exit 33A on I-5
0.31	0.50	1B	El Camino Real to I-5 north	Westbound exit and eastbound entrance
0.82	1.32	1C	Carmel Creek Road	Signed as exit 1 eastbound
1.81	2.91	2	Carmel Country Road	
3.10	4.99	3	Carmel Valley Road	
6.07	9.77	6	Camino del Sur	
7.23	11.64	7	Black Mountain Road	
8.04	12.94	8	Rancho Peñasquitos Boulevard	Connects to CR S4
9.21	14.82	9	I-15 (Escondido Freeway)	Partial at-grade intersection with ramps; east end of freeway; eastern terminus; no exit number westbound; exit 19 on I-15
9.21	14.82	–	Ted Williams Parkway east	Continuation beyond I-15
1.000 mi = 1.609 km; 1.000 km = 0.621 mi: Incomplete access
