= Eugene Amano =

American football player (born 1982)

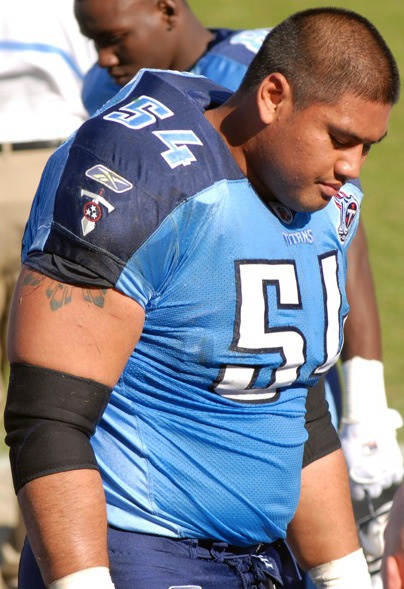
- Amano with the Tennessee Titans in 2008

No. 64, 54
- Position: Center

Personal information
- Born: March 1, 1982 (age 44); Manila, Philippines
- Listed height: 6 ft 3 in (1.91 m)
- Listed weight: 300 lb (136 kg)

Career information
- High school: Rancho Bernardo (San Diego, California, U.S.)
- College: Southeast Missouri State
- NFL draft: 2004: 7th round, 239th overall pick

Career history
- Tennessee Titans (2004−2012)

Career NFL statistics
- Games played: 124
- Games started: 68
- Fumble recoveries: 2
- Stats at Pro Football Reference

Eugene Philip Amano (born March 1, 1982) is a Filipino-American former professional football player who played nine seasons for the Tennessee Titans of the National Football League (NFL) from 2004 to 2013. He played both as a center and guard. In 2010, he replaced eight-time All-Pro selection Kevin Mawae as the starting center. Amano is believed to be the only full-blooded Filipino to play in the NFL and is one of the few NFL players born in the Philippines.

== Early life ==
Amano was born on March 1, 1982, in Manila, Philippines, while his father, who served in the U.S. Navy, was stationed there. Amano's family moved back to the United States when he was just two months old and settled in National City, California.

== High school career ==
Amano attended Rancho Bernardo High School in San Diego, California, where he was an all-conference performer as an offensive and defensive lineman during his senior season and also lettered in basketball and track.

Late into his senior year, Amano had no scholarship offers and planned to walk-on to either the University of New Mexico or San Diego State University. But when Southeast Missouri State called one of his high school coaches about players on his team, he sold the recruiters on Amano. The recruiters acquired a tape of Amano and immediately offered him a scholarship.

== College career ==
Amano attended Southeast Missouri State University. As a senior, he won the Division I-AA Dave Rimington Trophy, given annually to top center in college football at each level of competition. Amano was also named first-team All-American by the American Football Coaches Association (AFCA), Football Gazette, and The NFL Draft Report.

== Professional career ==
Projected to go undrafted by Sports Illustrated, who labeled him as "a solid practice-squad prospect," Amano was ranked as the No. 20 center available in the 2004 NFL draft. He was eventually selected in the seventh round, 239th overall, by the Titans. He was the seventh of nine centers selected in this draft, and also the first offensive lineman selected from Southeast Missouri State since Dan Peiffer in 1973.

For his first four NFL seasons, Amano served primarily as a reserve at both center and guard. In 2008, he replaced left guard Jacob Bell in the starting lineup, and went on to start 31 games at that position. In 2009, Amano was a member of an offensive line that blocked for the NFL's second-best rushing attack (162.0 yards per game) allowed just 16 sacks, the second fewest in the NFL.

On February 17, 2010, Amano signed a five-year, $26.25 million contract with $10.5 million guaranteed. Amano was moved to center to replace a retiring Kevin Mawae.

Amano was released by the Titans in 2013 after missing the entire 2012 season due to a torn triceps injury.

== Business career ==
After retiring from professional football, Amano and his brother, Frederick Amano, purchased four existing L&L Hawaiian Barbecue franchises in their hometown of San Diego, California, and have since opened more franchises for the restaurant chain, including one in the Nashville metropolitan area in Cool Springs, Tennessee.

== Philanthropy ==
Amano established the Amano Family Foundation with the goal of assisting military families in the San Diego area. He recalls the struggles he faced as the child of a serviceman, coping with the absence of his father due to constant deployments. To address the same challenges he experienced growing up, Amano hosts football camps for military children, providing them with instruction and training from high school football coaches and former collegiate and NFL players. Additionally, the foundation arranges trips to San Diego State football games so that the children will have activities to enjoy while their parents are deployed.

Amano aims to coordinate a collective effort with other athletes of Filipino descent to provide aid and fight the overwhelming poverty in the Philippines.

== Personal life ==
Amano is married to Frances Santos. The couple splits their time between Nashville, Tennessee, and San Diego, California.
