= Westview High School (San Diego) =

Public high school in San Diego, California, United States

Coordinates: 32°58′01.63″N 117°08′56.53″W

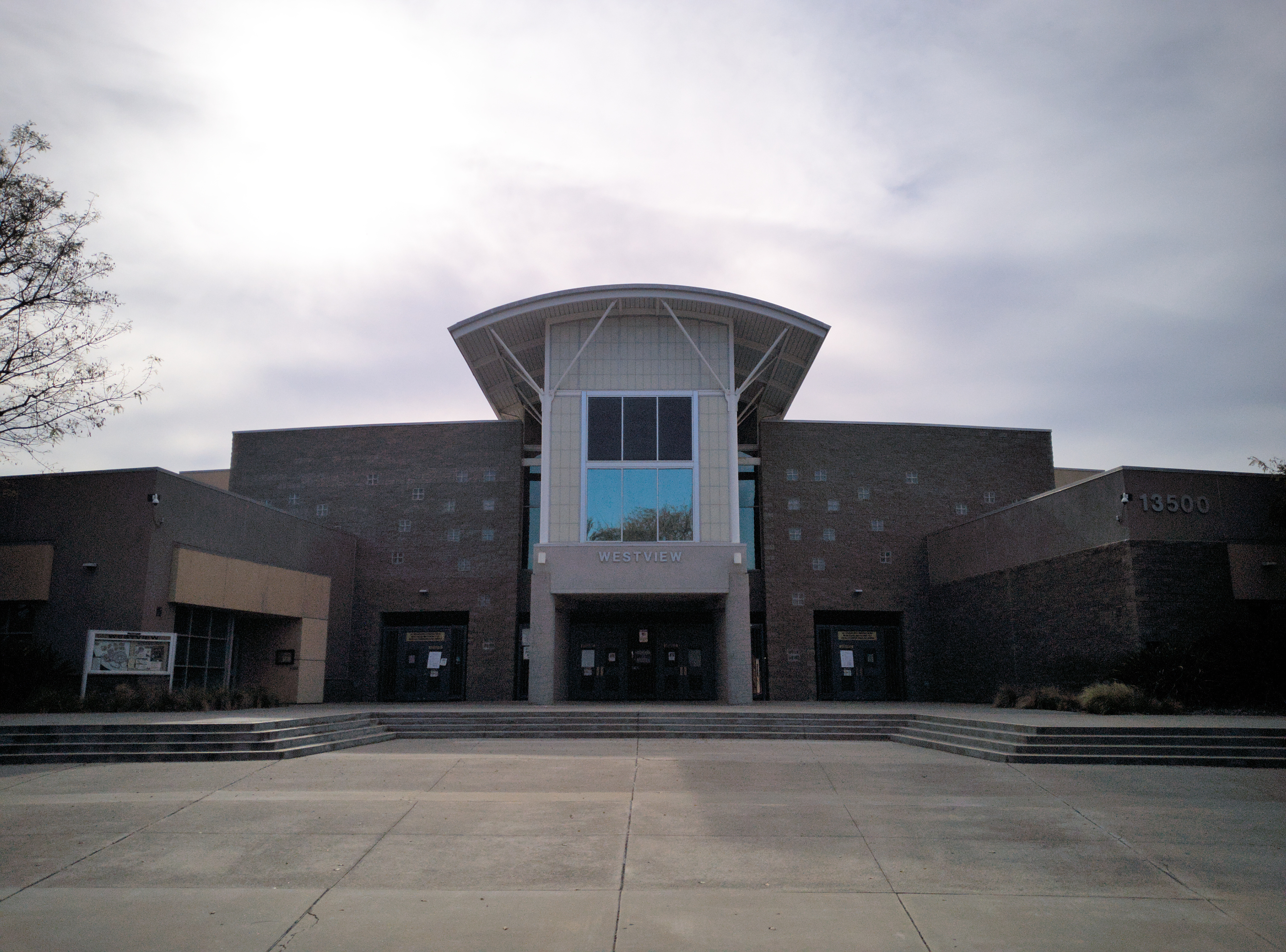

Location
- 13500 Camino Del Sur; San Diego, California 92129

Information
- Type: Public
- Established: August 27, 2002
- School district: Poway Unified School District
- Superintendent: Marian Kim Phelps, Ed.D.
- Principal: Ernie Remillard (Left in Spring 2026, will not return)
- Grades: 9–12
- Enrollment: 2,257 (2022-23)
- Colors: Black, Vegas Gold, & White
- Team name: Wolverines
- Accreditation: Blue Ribbon: 2022
- Publication: wvnexus.org
- Feeder schools: Mesa Verde Middle School and Black Mountain Middle School
- Website: Westview High

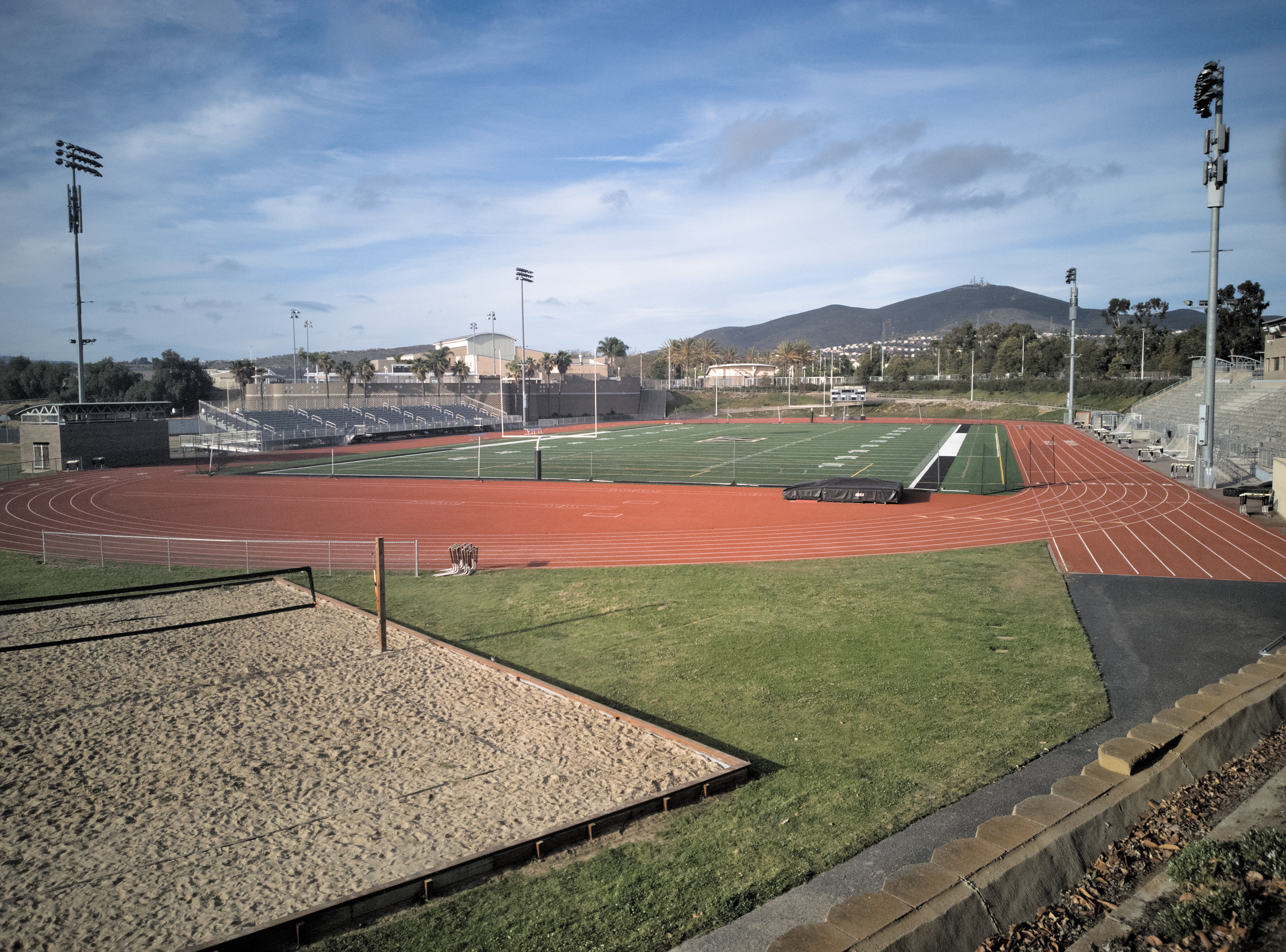
Volleyball courts, 400 meter track, and football field. Black Mountain in the far distance, image right.

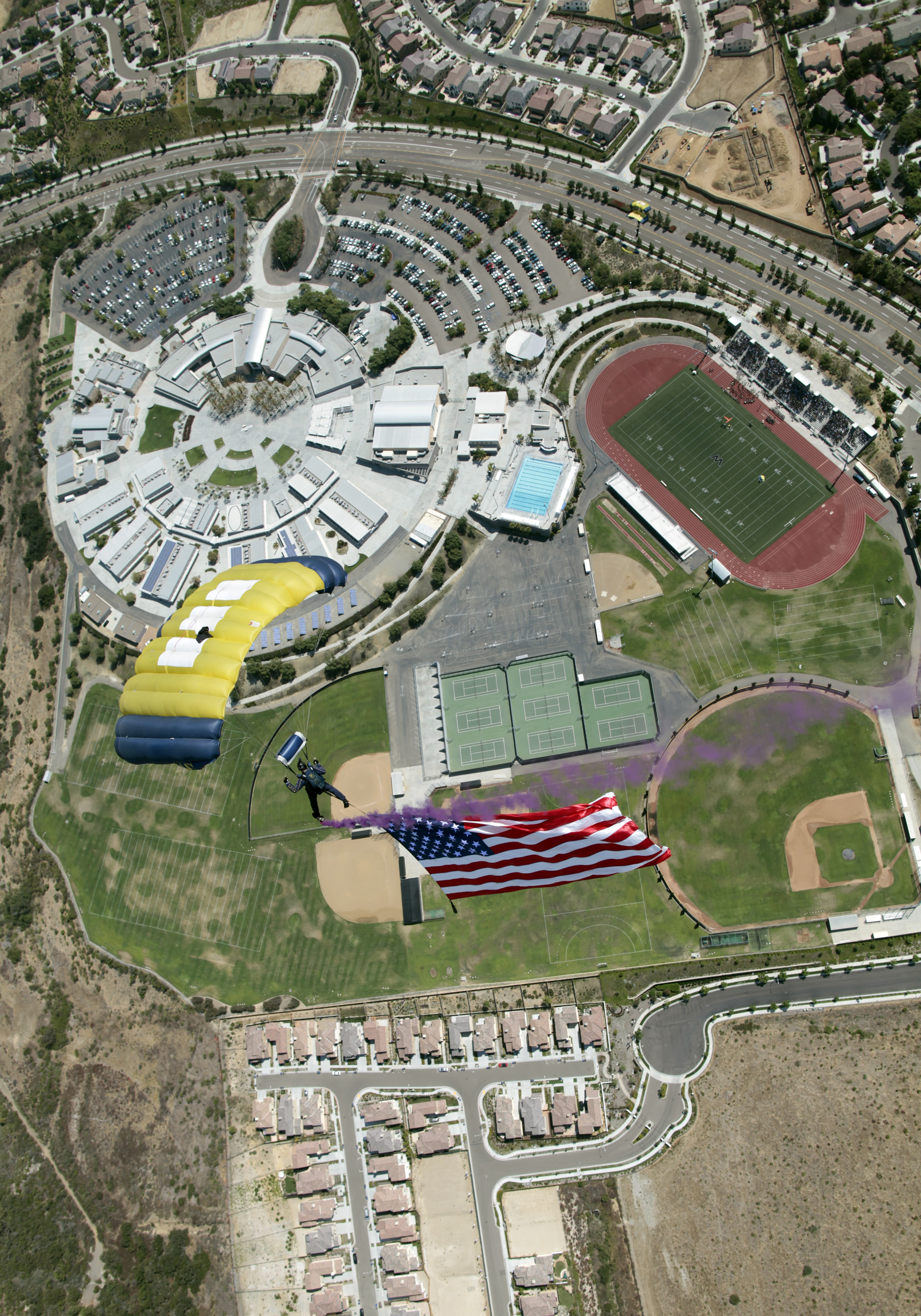
Chief Warrant Officer (SEAL) Keith Pritchett, assigned to the U.S. Navy parachute demonstration team, the Leap Frogs, flying a large American flag above Westview High School during a pep rally

Westview High School is a public high school in Torrey Highlands, a community of San Diego, California, United States. It is part of Poway Unified School District.

Westview uses a 4 by 4 block schedule for each school year. Under this system, the school year is divided into four quarters, as opposed to semester and trimester systems, allowing each student to complete up to eight classes each year.

Westview is accredited by the Schools Commission of the Western Association of Schools and Colleges. Its CEEB school code is #052-986.

Westview is a nationally recognized Blue Ribbon school. In 2022, Westview ranked #421 of 17,843 US high schools by the US News Best High Schools ranking.

== Administration and staff ==
Westview is divided into three "hubs," each with a separate administration system and cadre of homeroom teachers, designed to cultivate intraschool competition and camaraderie. The combined staff consists of 86 teachers, 4 administrators, 4 counselors, 3 librarians, 1 school psychologist, and 39 support staff.

== Enrollment ==
As of the 2019-2020 school year, 2,376 students were enrolled at the school. Of these students, 595 of them were enrolled in 9th grade, 581 in 10th, 602 in 11th, and 598 in 12th. The school's student body is 37.3% White, 37.9% Asian, 10.6% Hispanic or Latino, 2.2% African American, 0.5% Pacific Islander, 0.1% Native American, and 11.6% Two or more races.

Of the 586 graduates of the school in 2011, 94% decided to attend college. Of these, 73% went to 4-year colleges and the remaining 27% to 2-year colleges.

== Academics ==
A 4x4 block learning schedule is implemented at Westview, meaning that over the course of a year a student will take up to eight courses, or four each semester. Each course is broken into two nine-week quarters each worth five credits, or the equivalent of a semester at most high schools that go by the semester system. In addition to the four daily classes, there are various other periods such as Homeroom, Silent Study Hall (SSH), and Wolverine Time, a tutorial period, which occurs on Tuesdays, Wednesdays, and Thursdays. School begins at 8:35 AM on all days except Wednesday, when it begins at 9:55 AM. School ends at 3:45 PM except on "minimum days" on final exam dates where only half the classes exist.

Graduation from Westview requires meeting PUSD's course requirements. They include a biological science course, a civics and economics course, a fine arts course, two math courses (at least one math course must be taken in each of 9th and 10th grade), a physical science course, one English course in each grade, and one course in each of U.S. history and world history. In addition to the required ninth-grade physical education requirement, one other physical education course is needed. Though not required for graduation, students must also take at least two foreign language courses in the same language in order to be able to enter a state university. In addition, all students must take at least 8.5 elective courses to graduate, which can be satisfied by completing extra courses in the subject areas above, or by completing designated elective courses. Students also need to pass the California High School Exit Exam. For the graduating class of 2030 and all classes after, the requirements change slightly, with the requirement of 3 math courses and 9.0 elective courses to achieve minimum graduation requirements.

Grade point averages are computed with each quarter receiving either an A, B, C, D, or F, which correspond to 4, 3, 2, 1, and 0, respectively. In addition to one Honors course, all Advanced Placement courses are assigned values of 5, 4, 3, 1, and 0, for these grades. A grade of "F" in any course means a failing grade, and as such will not qualify for graduation credits, and if the course is a required course, it must be retaken and passed in order to qualify. A grade of "D" in any course that has it will qualify for graduation credits, but will not count as having been passed for entry into state universities, and as such if a student who wishes to enter a state university after graduation earns this grade, they must retake the course and earn at least a "C". However, not all courses include a grade of D, as some only go down to C and consider anything lower as an F; in such courses, at least a C is necessary to pass the course and earn graduation credits.

Grades in Advanced Placement courses will be changed to an A for a 4 or 5 score on the AP exam.

== School activities ==
Westview High School offers a variety of clubs, sports, and parties.

Clubs usually meet weekly or biweekly, during lunch or after school. Notable clubs include Science Olympiad club, Westview Mathematica, KPCDC (K-pop Dance Culture Dance Club), Speech & Debate, and Quizbowl. Clubs must have an advisor, a teacher from the school, on campus for every meeting. Clubs are managed by Westview Interclub.

Sports include cheer, basketball, badminton, cross country, baseball, field hockey, golf, flag football (girls'), soccer, gymnastics, football, lacrosse, water polo, tennis, wrestling, beach volleyball (girls'), volleyball, softball, swim and dive, and track and field.

Parties include prom, homecoming, and MORP.

== Notable alumni ==
- Arianna Afsar, singer and actress, American Idol 8, 2011 Miss America pageant, Chicago production of the musical Hamilton
- Dakota Dickerson (class of 2015), race car driver in Formula 3 and Formula 4
- James Holmes (class of 2006), mass murderer
- Michael Mercado (class of 2017), baseball pitcher for the Philadelphia Phillies
- Taylor McNamara, American football tight end
- Kelly Marie Tran (class of 2007), actress, cast as Rose Tico in Star Wars: The Last Jedi
- Cailin Russo, American recording artist and model
- Gabby Scott (class of 2015), track athlete, 400 meter event for Puerto Rico at the World Championships and the 2024 Olympics

== See also ==
- Primary and secondary schools in San Diego, California
