= Frances Dawn Halfaker =

American veterans' advocate

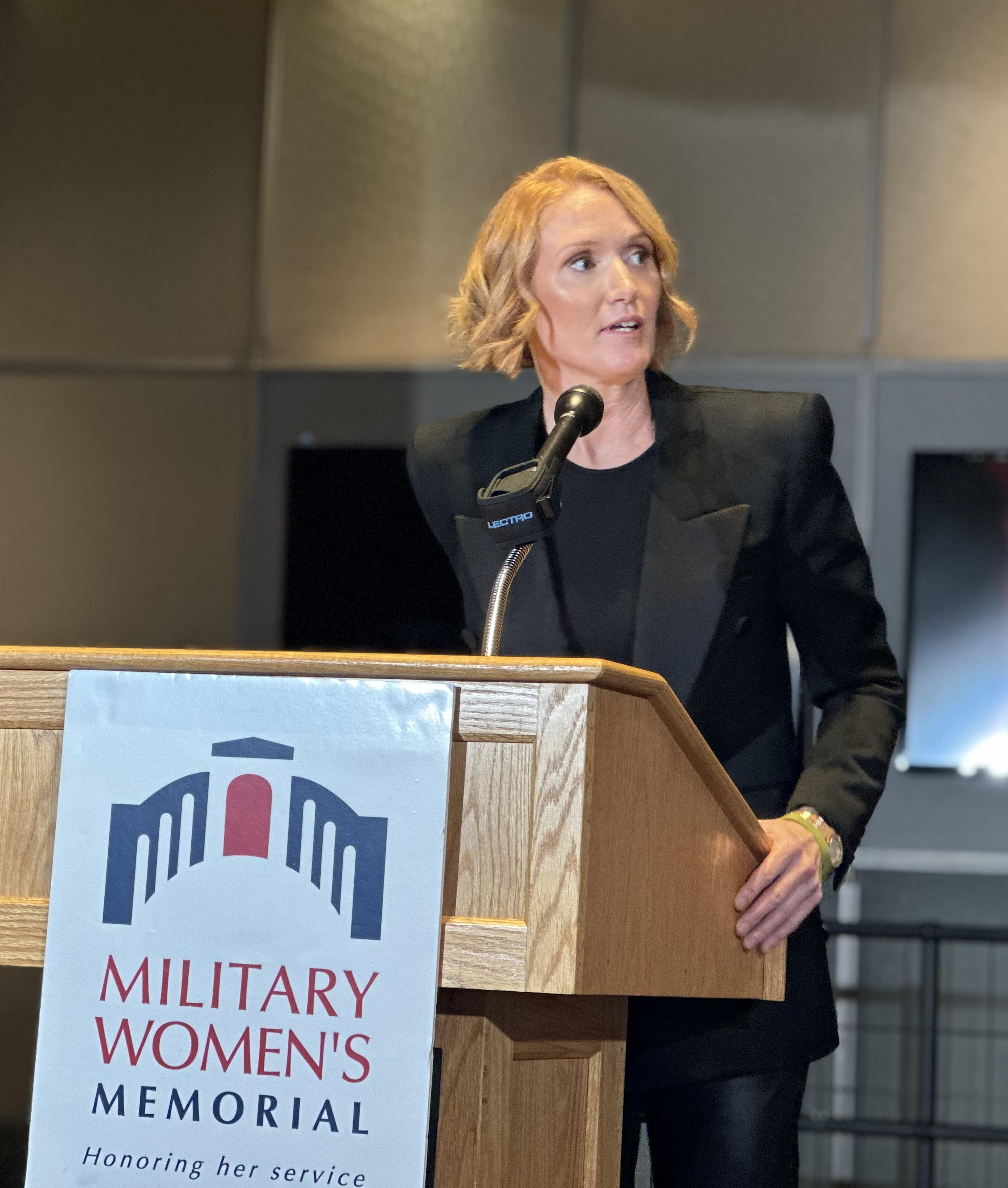
- Born: Frances Dawn Halfaker; July 26, 1979 (age 46); San Diego, California, U.S.
- Citizenship: United States
- Education: United States Military Academy; Georgetown University
- Occupations: Veteran advocate, entrepreneur, philanthropist
- Organization: Continuing to Serve Foundation
- Known for: Founder of Halfaker and Associates
- Title: President and CEO of HAFCO Holdings
- Board member of: Continuing to Serve Foundation; Harmonia Holdings Group
- Awards: Bronze Star Medal; Purple Heart

Frances Dawn Halfaker (July 26, 1979) is an American veteran, veterans' advocate, entrepreneur and philanthropist from San Diego, California. She is a recipient of the Bronze Star and Purple Heart and is currently President and CEO of HAFCO Holdings and Founder of the Continuing to Serve Foundation.

== Biography ==
Dawn Halfaker was born on July 26, 1979, and raised in San Diego, California, where she was an athlete at Rancho Bernardo High School. She obtained her Bachelor’s degree from the United States Military Academy at West Point where she also played on the women’s basketball team.

She also holds a Master of Arts in Security Studies from Georgetown University in Washington, D.C. Halfaker worked closely with the Defense Sciences Office of the Defense Advanced Research Projects Agency (DARPA) and served as an advisor for the Chairperson of the House of Armed Services Committee with a focus on Department of Defense legislation issues.

After graduating in 2001 from the West Point, Halfaker was commissioned in the Army as a military police officer and was stationed at Camp Casey, South Korea with the 2nd Infantry Division. After her tour in Korea, Halfaker was subsequently stationed at Fort Stewart, Ga., with the 293rd Military Police Company and deployed to Iraq.

In 2004, Halfaker was severely injured when her military police patrol was ambushed by enemy insurgents in Iraq. Halfaker was medically retired from the Army in 2005 due to injuries sustained in combat.

In 2006, she founded Halfaker and Associates, a Virginia based technology services company focused on providing end-to-end digital services for government organizations. The company focused on hiring Veterans and Wounded Warriors. In 2021, the firm was acquired by Science Applications International Corporation. Upon the sale of Halfaker and Associates, Dawn established a private investment firm, HAFCO Holdings LLC, and the Continuing to Serve Foundation, a non-profit organization supporting veteran entrepreneurs.

In 2011, Dawn was listed among Fortune’s Most Powerful Women Entrepreneurs and received the Washington Business Journal Women Who Mean Business Award.

The same year, Worth included Halfaker in its list of "20 Entrepreneurs to Watch".

The following year, Halfaker was recognized as Civilian Job's Most Valuable Employer for Military in 2012. Also in 2012, she was recognized as the Ernst & Young Greater Washington Entrepreneur of the Year.

In 2013, she was named a White House Women Veterans Champion of Change.

=== Military service ===
During her service in the United States Army, Halfaker held leadership positions in peacekeeping and in training in the United States, South Korea, Kuwait, and Iraq. She also commanded a platoon of ground soldiers in combat. In 2004, she deployed to Iraq as a Military Police Officer with the 3rd Infantry Division. There, she was wounded in combat and earned a Bronze Star and Purple Heart for her service. She underwent over 20 operations at Walter Reed National Military Medical Center including the amputation of her right arm.

=== Advocacy ===
As a retired Army Captain, Halfaker has dedicated much of her life to advocacy for Veterans. She previously served as the President of the Board of Directors for the Wounded Warrior Project and she currently serves as a member of the USO board of Governors and the Board of Directors for the Vail Veterans Program. She also remains active with several advisory committees and veteran service organizations.

== Filmography ==
=== Film ===
Year	Title	Role	Notes
2007	Alive Day Memories: Home from Iraq	Herself	
