= Rancho Bernardo, San Diego =

- Community of San Diego
- Rancho Bernardo
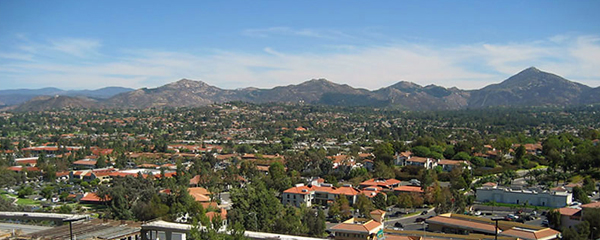
- Residential areas within Rancho Bernardo
- Nickname: RB
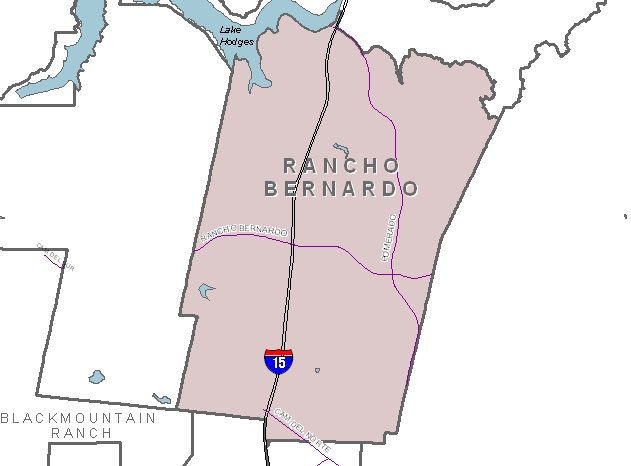
- Rancho Bernardo and neighborhood boundaries

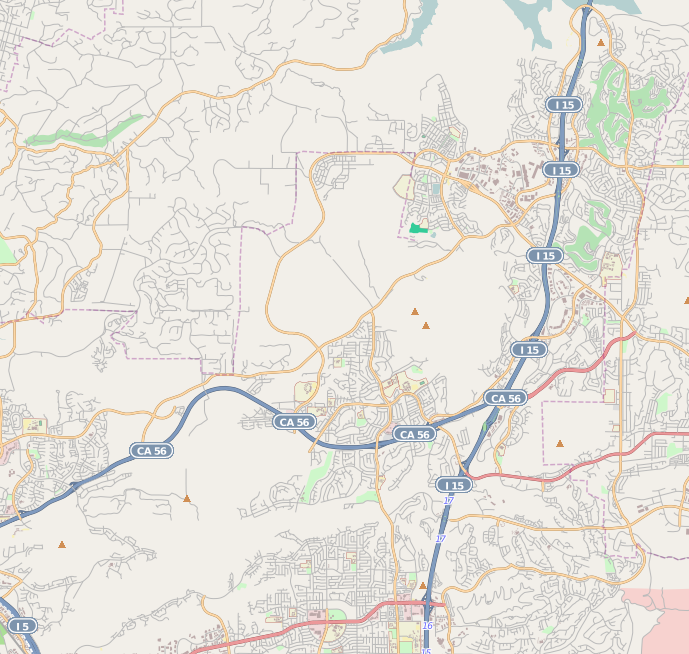
- Location within Northeastern San Diego Rancho Bernardo, San Diego (San Diego County, California)
- Coordinates: 33°01′N 117°04′W
- Country: United States
- State: California
- County: San Diego
- City: San Diego
- Established: Annexed February, 1962

Area
  - Total: 65.8 sq mi (170 km^{2})

Population (2019)
  - Total: 133,481
  - Density: 2,029.3/sq mi (783.5/km^{2})
- Time zone: UTC-8 (Pacific Standard Time)
  - Summer (DST): UTC-7 (Pacific Daylight Time)
- Postal code: 92128

Rancho Bernardo is a master-planned community in the northern hills of San Diego County, California.

== Geography ==
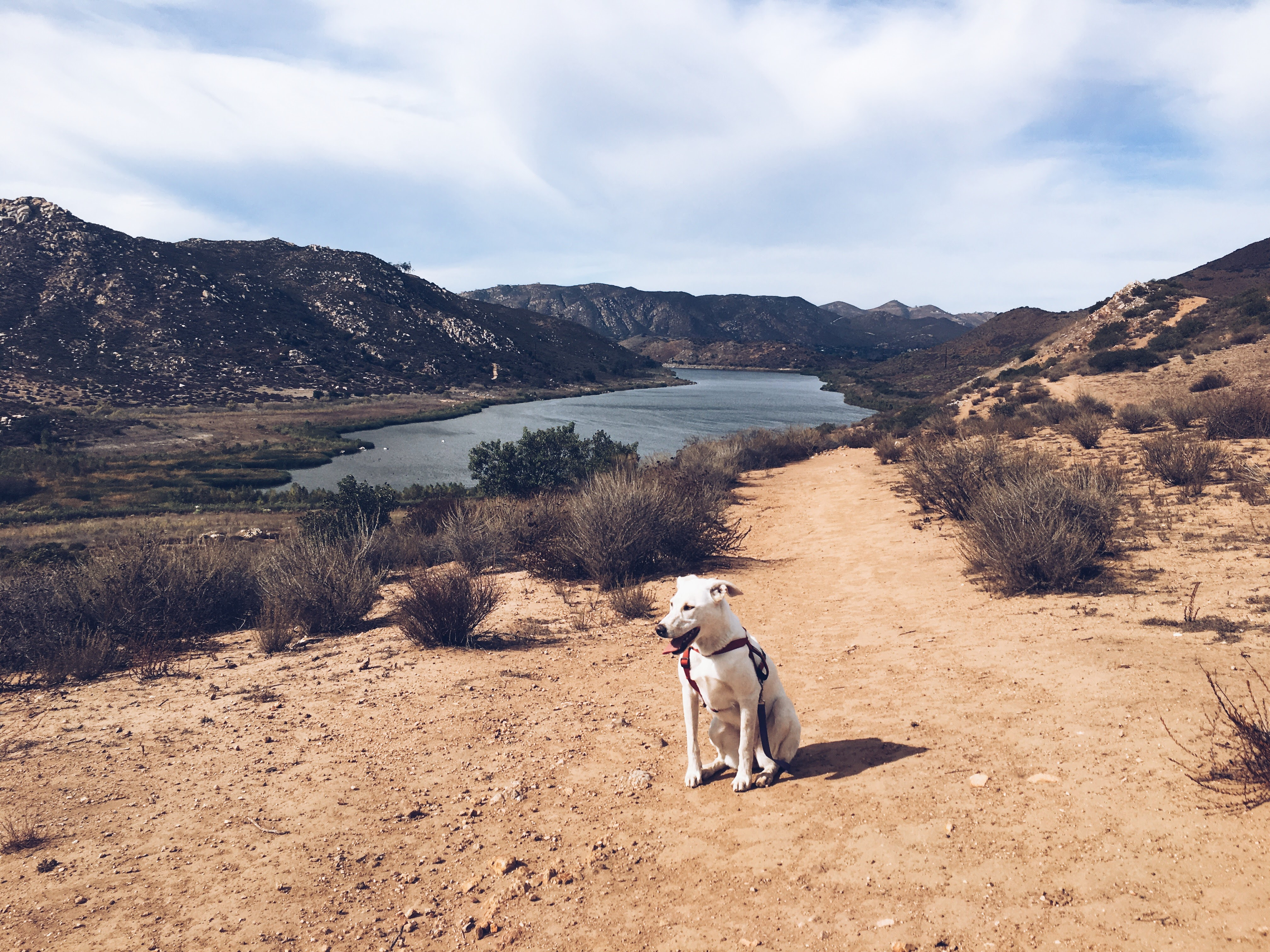
A dog poses along a hiking trail near Lake Hodges

The topography of Rancho Bernardo consists of canyons and rolling hills that have large bedrock outcroppings. The major floral biomes of Rancho Bernardo are chaparral, coastal sage scrub, Southern California grassland and freshwater marsh/riparian habitat.

The community is a sprawling community with shopping centers, golf courses, and office parks typical of San Diego development located about 20 miles (32 km) north-northeast of downtown San Diego, immediately east of 4S Ranch, north of Carmel Mountain Ranch, northwest of the city of Poway, and south of the city of Escondido.

=== Climate ===
Rancho Bernardo has a Mediterranean climate (Köppen Csa). Rancho Bernardo has warm, dry summers and mild winters. Rainfall is relatively sparse, and most rain falls between December and March.

Climate data for Rancho Bernardo, San Diego (normals and extremes 2000–present)
Month	Jan	Feb	Mar	Apr	May	Jun	Jul	Aug	Sep	Oct	Nov	Dec	Year
Record high °F (°C)	91 (33)	90 (32)	91 (33)	101 (38)	102 (39)	101 (38)	109 (43)	99 (37)	106 (41)	102 (39)	95 (35)	84 (29)	109 (43)
Mean daily maximum °F (°C)	67.2 (19.6)	66.5 (19.2)	67.6 (19.8)	70.4 (21.3)	71.6 (22.0)	76.1 (24.5)	81.5 (27.5)	82.8 (28.2)	81.1 (27.3)	77.5 (25.3)	71.3 (21.8)	66.1 (18.9)	73.3 (22.9)
Daily mean °F (°C)	56.6 (13.7)	56.2 (13.4)	58.2 (14.6)	60.9 (16.1)	63.5 (17.5)	67.0 (19.4)	72.1 (22.3)	73.4 (23.0)	70.7 (21.5)	67.2 (19.6)	60.7 (15.9)	55.2 (12.9)	63.5 (17.5)
Mean daily minimum °F (°C)	45.9 (7.7)	45.9 (7.7)	48.8 (9.3)	51.3 (10.7)	55.3 (12.9)	57.8 (14.3)	62.6 (17.0)	63.9 (17.7)	60.3 (15.7)	56.9 (13.8)	50.1 (10.1)	44.3 (6.8)	53.6 (12.0)
Record low °F (°C)	29 (−2)	32 (0)	35 (2)	37 (3)	42 (6)	47 (8)	53 (12)	54 (12)	49 (9)	44 (7)	36 (2)	31 (−1)	29 (−2)
Average precipitation inches (mm)	2.79 (71)	3.44 (87)	2.04 (52)	1.09 (28)	0.38 (9.7)	0.08 (2.0)	0.10 (2.5)	0.05 (1.3)	0.17 (4.3)	0.66 (17)	1.08 (27)	2.28 (58)	14.16 (360)
Source: NOAA

== History ==
=== Pre-Colonial ===
The pre-colonial history of this area is divided into an early (prior to circa 900 BCE) and a late period. The period of habitation is from around 850 CE to 1790 CE. The peoples believed to have occupied this site are the Kumeyaay (formerly known as Diegueno/Ipai), although there are strong traces of Luiseño as well. During the late period, the Westwood Valley complex was a village located along an intermittent stream bed. This village was likely known to the Kumeyaay as Sinyau-Pichkara. The area the village occupied is now under the western section of Ranch Bernardo near Duenda and Poblado Roads.

=== Post-Colonial ===
Rancho Bernardo is located on the Rancho San Bernardo Mexican land grant made between 1842 and 1845.

In the 1960s, Rancho Bernardo was annexed by San Diego. The area was developed by AVCO Community Developers until their involvement ceased in 1984. The Rancho Bernardo Inn opened at the center of the development in 1963.

On October 22, 2007, the Witch Creek Fire burned through Rancho Bernardo and several other populous areas of San Diego County, destroying hundreds of homes, and completely destroying several entire neighborhoods, particularly ones that firefighters had trouble accessing due to rugged terrain and rapidly advancing flames pushed by strong Santa Ana winds. The highly unpredictable flames pushed into the northeast section of Poway during the day, prompting evacuation of Palomar-Pomerado Hospital. The neighborhoods of the Trails, Montelena and Westwood were the main areas hit in Rancho Bernardo.

== Economy ==
The Carmel Mountain Ranch/Rancho Bernardo submarket is the fifth largest office space submarket in San Diego County, with over 6 million square feet of office space. It is part of an "I-15 edge city", edge city being a major center of employment outside a traditional downtown.

=== Tourism ===
There is an annual carnival-type street fair, RB Alive!, during the summer. Rancho Bernardo is also home to the oldest-operating winery in the region, the Bernardo Winery, established in 1889 and family-owned and operated since 1927.

=== Industry ===
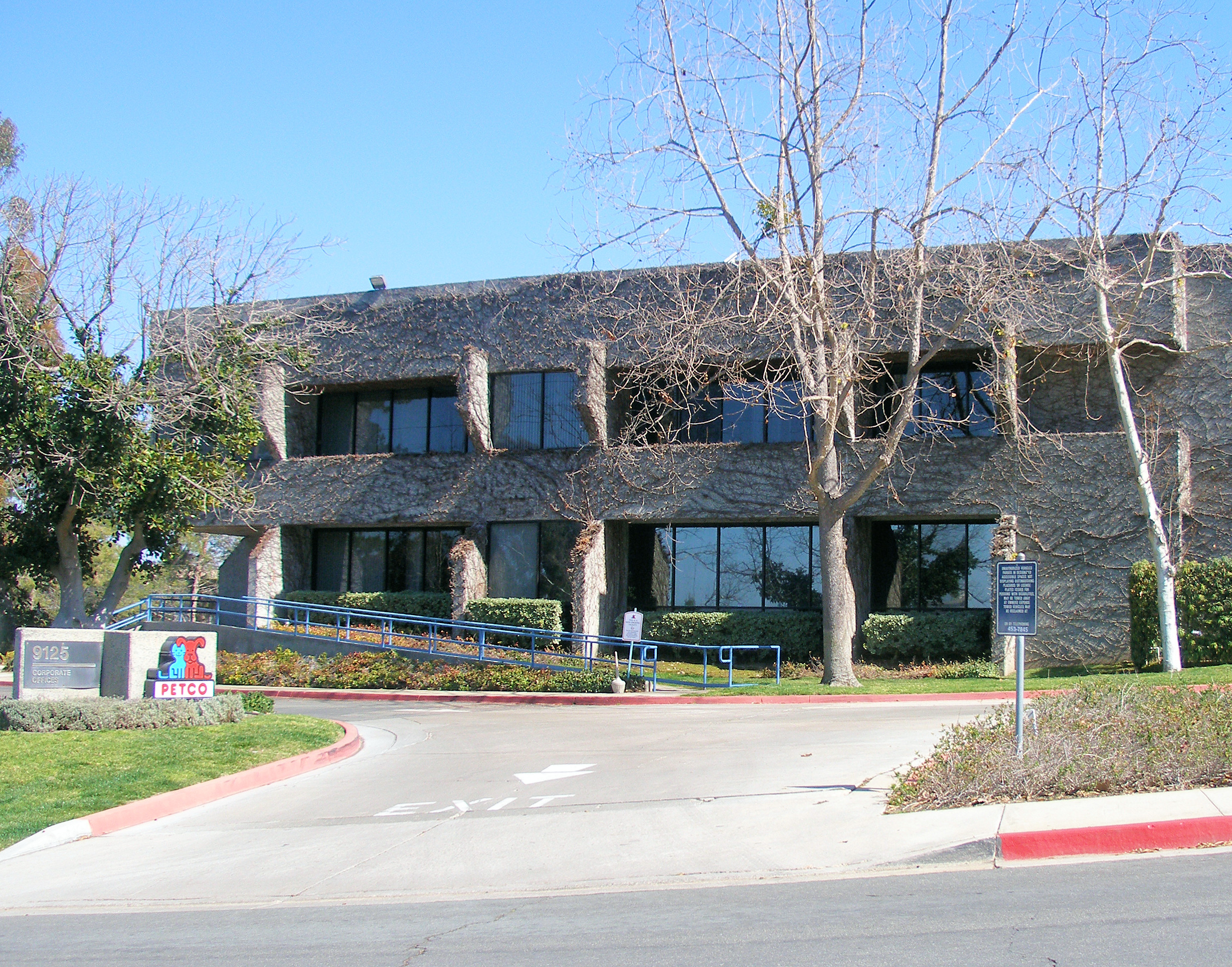
Petco corporate headquarters

Rancho Bernardo is home to the corporate headquarters campus of Petco, which is 300,000 square feet and includes a dog park and other play spaces and habitat for wildlife. The neighborhood also has an office of Sony Electronics, Inc. and a major office of Sony Interactive Entertainment, LLC. Other companies with a presence in the area include General Atomics, Broadcom, Hewlett-Packard, Microsoft, Renovate America, Teradata, LSI Corporation, BAE Systems, ASML, Northrop Grumman and Amazon. Located in a 685 acres (277 ha) business park, there are approximately 50,000 workers employed by these companies.

== Education ==
The area is part of the Poway Unified School District.

=== Schools ===
Primary

- Creekside Elementary School
- Highland Ranch Elementary School
- Shoal Creek Elementary School
- Turtleback Elementary School
- Westwood Elementary School
- Chaparral Elementary School
- Painted Rock Elementary School

Secondary

- Bernardo Heights Middle School
- Rancho Bernardo High School

== In popular culture ==
The Rancho Bernardo Inn was used as a movie set for the film Traffic.

== Notable people ==
- Bob Miller (baseball, born 1939), former baseball pitcher Los Angeles Dodgers, St Louis Cardinals, New York Mets
