= Rancho Bernardo High School =

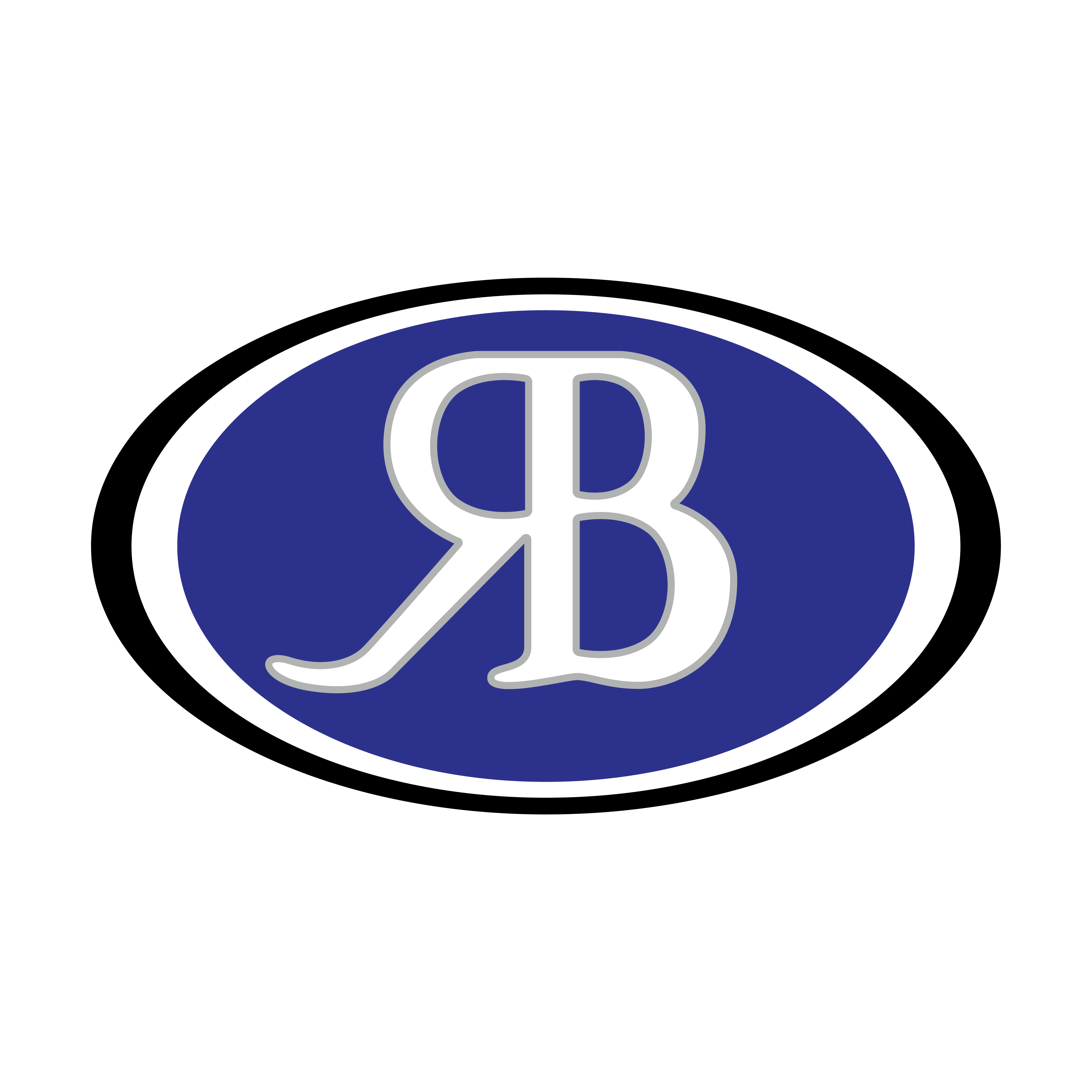

Location
- 13010 Paseo Lucido; San Diego, California 92128; United States; 32°59′43″N 117°03′58″W

Information
- Type: Public high school
- Established: 1991
- School district: Poway Unified School District
- CEEB code: 052536
- NCES School ID: 063153010004
- Principal: Kellie Moore
- Teaching staff: 90.36 (FTE)
- Grades: 9–12
- Enrollment: 2,210 (2024-2025)
- Student to teacher ratio: 24.46
- Schedule: 4x4 block schedule
- Hours in school day: 7 hours
- Campus type: Suburban
- Colors: Silver, blue, and white
- Athletics conference: Palomar League
- Mascot: Billy the Bronco
- Nickname: Broncos
- Rival: Poway High School
- Newspaper: The Silver Spur
- Yearbook: Legends
- Feeder schools: Bernardo Heights Middle School and Meadowbrook Middle School
- Website: Rancho Bernardo High School

Rancho Bernardo High School (RBHS) is a public high school in San Diego County, California. It is part of Poway Unified School District. The school opened in 1991 as the district's third high school.

== Enrollment ==
For the 2019-2020 school year, about 2,300 students attended Rancho Bernardo High School. When divided by class, 609 students were in 9th grade, 580 in 10th, 581 in 11th, and 582 in 12th. The student body is 46.6% White, 22.7% Asian, 16.3% Hispanic or Latino, 2.3% African American, 0.5% Native Hawaiian or Pacific Islander, and 0.1% Native American or Alaska Native.

== Controversies ==
=== Broomstick incident ===
In a 1997 incident, three baseball players pleaded guilty to sodomizing a new teammate with a broom handle as a form of hazing. The school district paid $675,000 to settle the claim, and the three players were sentenced to time in juvenile hall

== Notable alumni ==
- Kristoffer Domeij, Sergeant First Class, 75th Ranger Regiment, enlisted 2001, killed in action in 2011 during his 14th deployment with the most deployments for a U.S. soldier KIA at the time of his death
- Erin McGathy, American actress and comedian
- Nia Akins, track and field athlete
- Eugene Amano, National Football League offensive lineman
- Matt Araiza, National Football League punter
- Wynton Bernard, Major League Baseball outfielder
- Hank Blalock, Major League Baseball third baseman
- Parker Bugg, Major League Baseball pitcher
- Brian Patrick Butler, actor and filmmaker
- Adam Daniel, actor
- Allan Dykstra, baseball player
- Tom DeLonge, guitarist and vocalist for Blink-182 (attended but did not graduate from Rancho Bernardo High School)
- Molly Grabill, marathon runner
- Dawn Halfaker, U.S. Army veteran and entrepreneur
- Cole Hamels, Major League Baseball pitcher
- Alex Jackson, MLB catcher
- Anurag Kashyap, winner of the 78th Scripps National Spelling Bee, and quiz contestant
- Gosuke Katoh, Major League Baseball infielder
- Stephanie Kim, singer and dancer in TSZX The Grace
- Knock2, aka Richard Nakhonethap, DJ and music producer
- Caity Lotz, actress, dancer, model, and singer
- Reed McKenna, professional soccer midfielder
- Cal Mitchell, Major League Baseball outfielder
- Danny Putnam, Major League Baseball outfielder
- Scott Raynor, former drummer for Blink-182
- Jelynn Rodriguez, host of the American Sí TV show The Drop
- Devaughn Vele, National Football League wide receiver
- Alika Williams, Major League Baseball shortstop
- Trevor Williams, Major League Baseball pitcher
- Aaron Wallace Jr., National Football League linebacker
- Will Yeatman, National Football League offensive tackle

== See also ==
- Rancho Bernardo, San Diego, California
- Primary and secondary schools in San Diego, California
