= Poway Unified School District =

School district in California, United States

Address
- 15250 Avenue of Science San Diego, California, 92128; United States

District information
- Type: Public
- Grades: K–12
- NCES District ID: 0631530

Students and staff
- Students: 35,663 (2020–2021)
- Teachers: 1,527.24 (FTE)
- Staff: 3,066.94 (FTE)
- Student–teacher ratio: 23.35:1

Other information
- Website: www.powayusd.com

Poway Unified School District is a school district based in Poway, California. The district operates 26 elementary schools (grades Preschool–5), seven middle schools (6–8); five comprehensive high schools (9–12); and one continuation high school. 21 of the district's schools are located in San Diego; eleven others are in Poway. The district serves approximately 33,000 students in San Diego County. The superintendent is Ben Churchill.

== Poway Regional Occupation Program ==
High school students may earn credits to meet high school graduation requirements by taking career-technical education classes offered by the Regional Occupation Program at various sites throughout the district, both after school and in the evenings. These courses are designed to provide students with the opportunity to apply academic skills, explore and prepare for careers, develop leadership skills, and ultimately to provide students with the skills necessary for a successful transition to post-secondary education and the workforce.

The Regional Occupation Program is affiliated with the San Diego County Office of Education Regional Occupational Program. Students can take classes from other school districts that participate in the Regional Occupational Program.

== School construction and renovation ==
In the early 2000s, schools built for 500 children had as many as 700 children attending. Poway High School, built to hold 1,500 students, had 3,100 students in attendance in the 2004–2005 school year. The oldest school building in the district was built in 1949. Many of the other school district's buildings were constructed in the mid-1970s and were nearly 30 years old. Much of the wiring, plumbing, mechanical systems, and structures had not been updated.

In November 2002, voters approved the $198 million Proposition U bond measure. They approved an additional $179 million bond, Proposition C, in 2008. The money was intended to fund renovation, repairs, and construction at existing schools within the school district, including additional classrooms and electrical, plumbing, heating, and ventilation system upgrades for safety and efficiency. The money was also expected to be used to upgrade school facilities to meet current safety codes.

A requirement of Propositions U and C was the establishment of the Citizens' Oversight Committee. In May 2009, committee chair Chrissa Corday, in a final community report, concluded that "the goals achieved under Proposition U continue to foster voter confidence in the building program, as reflected in the successful passage of Proposition C, the ballot measure passed by PUSD voters in February 2008 that provides $179 million in bond authorization." Corday cited many notable accomplishments, including the demolition and reconstruction of Midland Elementary School, the district's oldest elementary school; the modernization and expansion of both Poway High School and Mt. Carmel High School, including the addition of a two-story, 81,000-square-foot classroom building at Poway High School; construction of new classrooms to replace portable buildings; upgrades to restroom facilities to comply with Americans with Disabilities Act (ADA); renovation and expansion of libraries and computer labs; complete modernization of seven of the oldest elementary schools in the district; full modernization and renovation of Twin Peaks Middle School, and full technology upgrades.

Some voters argued that the amount to be repaid was exorbitant. When presenting the bond offerings, the district guaranteed that there would be no increases in property taxes, which would require repayment to come from non-traditional sources. County Treasurer and tax collector Dan McAllister wondered about the future economic impact. "It's not just this generation, or the next generation, but probably two generations down the road," McAllister said of the economic impact of the bond. "We're not saying this is going to end up an Armageddon situation, but potentially the risks are much greater with this kind of financing than what would be a more traditional way," he added.

== Schools ==
=== High schools ===
- Abraxas High School (Eagles)
- Del Norte High School (Nighthawks)
- Mt. Carmel High School (Sundevils)
- Poway High School (Titans)
- Poway to Palomar Middle College High School (Comets) (Grade 11-12)
- Rancho Bernardo High School (Broncos)
- Westview High School (Wolverines)

=== Middle schools ===
- Bernardo Heights Middle School (Bobcats)
- Black Mountain Middle School (Raiders)
- Design 39 Campus
- Meadowbrook Middle School (Mustangs)
- Mesa Verde Middle School (Eagles)
- Twin Peaks Middle School (Rams)
- Oak Valley Middle School (Falcons)

=== Elementary schools ===
- Adobe Bluffs Elementary School (Ravens, originally Aztecs until March 2022)
- Canyon View Elementary School (Coyotes)
- Chaparral Elementary School (Hawks)
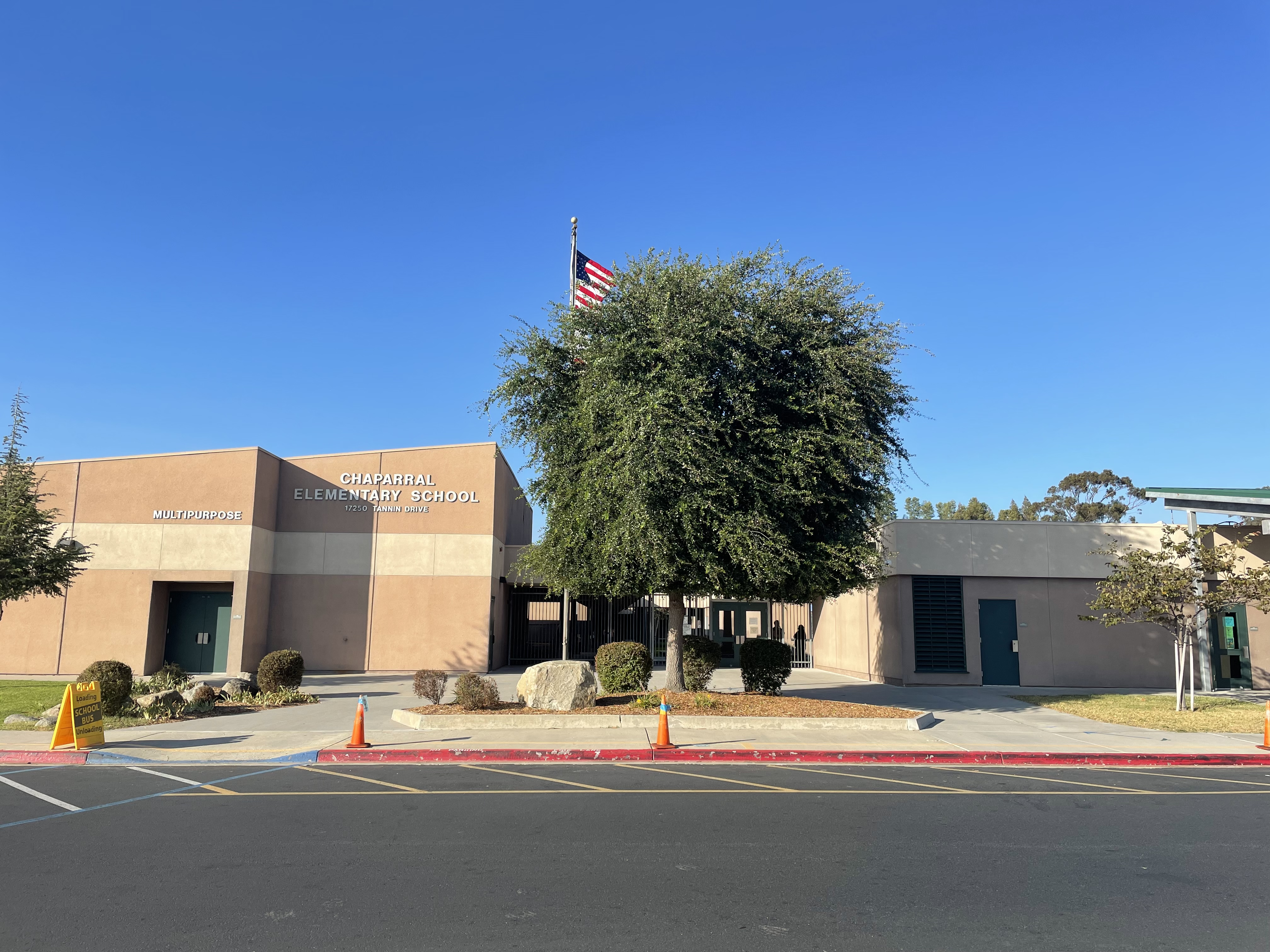
  Chaparral Elementary School
- Creekside Elementary School (Geckos)
- Deer Canyon Elementary School (Bucks)
- Del Sur Elementary School (Explorers)
- Design39Campus
- Garden Road Elementary School (Eagles)
- Highland Ranch Elementary School (Stallions)
- Los Peñasquitos Elementary School (Hawks)
- Midland Elementary School (Rattlesnakes)
- Monterey Ridge Elementary School (Monarchs)
- Morning Creek Elementary School (Colts)
- Painted Rock Elementary School (Panthers)
- Park Village Elementary School (Penguins)
- Pomerado Elementary School (Wildcats)
- Rolling Hills Elementary School (Pumas)
- Shoal Creek Elementary School (Otters)
- Stone Ranch Elementary School (Trailblazers)
- Sundance Elementary School (Wildcats)
- Sunset Hills Elementary School (Seagulls)
- Tierra Bonita Elementary School (Cheetahs)
- Turtleback Elementary School (Terrapins)
- Valley Elementary School (Tigers)
- Westwood Elementary School (Roadrunners)
- Willow Grove Elementary School (Grizzles)

== Transportation ==
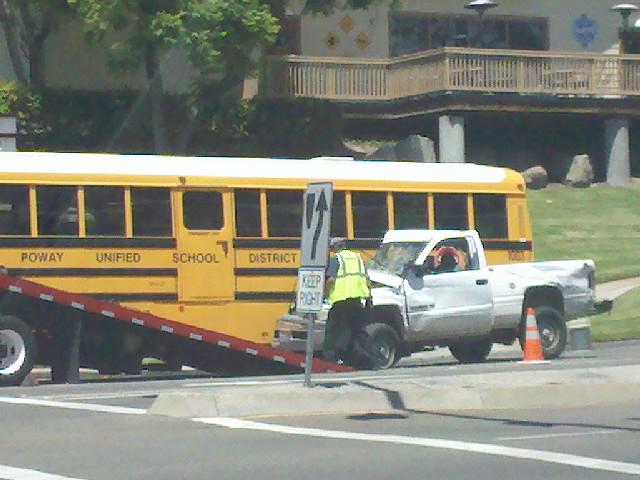
Poway Unified School District school bus.
