= List of hospitals in San Diego =

Hospital name, Website

This is a list of hospitals in San Diego, California.

Hospital name	Website
Alvarado Parkway Institute	http://www.apibhs.com/
Ambulatory Care Surgery Ctr	http://www.samedaysurgery.com/
Aurora Behavioral Health Care-San Diego	http://sandiego.aurorabehavioral.com/
Borrego Community Health Foundation	http://www.borregomedical.org/
Country Villa La Mesa Healthcare Center	http://www.countryvillahealth.com/locations/details/54
East Campus Medical Center at UC San Diego Health	https://healthlocations.ucsd.edu/san-diego/6655-alvarado-road
Kaiser Permanente San Diego Medical Center	https://healthy.kaiserpermanente.org/southern-california/facilities/Kaiser-Permanente-San-Diego-Medical-Center-331581
Kaiser Permanente Zion Medical Center	https://healthy.kaiserpermanente.org/southern-california/facilities/Kaiser-Permanente-Zion-Medical-Center-100084
Kearny Mesa Convalescent Hospital & Nursing Home	http://www.kearnymesaconvalescent.com/
Kindred Hospital - San Diego	http://www.kindredsandiego.com/
Magnolia Special Care Ctr	
Mission Valley Heights Surgery	http://mvhsc.com/
Naval Medical Center San Diego	
Pacific Beach Urgent Care	http://pburgentcare.com/
Palomar Medical Center Escondido	https://www.palomarhealth.org/locations/palomar-medical-center-escondido/
Palomar Medical Center Poway	https://www.palomarhealth.org/locations/palomar-medical-center-poway/
San Diego County Psychiatric Hospital	
Scripps Mercy Hospital	http://www.scripps.org/locations/hospitals__scripps-mercy-hospital
Select Specialty Hospital - San Diego	http://www.selectspecialtyhospitals.com
Sharp Chula Vista Medical Center	https://www.sharp.com/locations/hospitals/sharp-chula-vista
Sharp Coronado Hospital	https://www.sharp.com/locations/hospitals/sharp-coronado
Sharp Grossmont Hospital	https://www.sharp.com/locations/hospitals/sharp-grossmont
Sharp HealthCare	http://www.sharp.com/index.cfm
Sharp Mary Birch Hospital for Women & Newborns	https://www.sharp.com/locations/hospitals/sharp-mary-birch
Sharp McDonald Center	https://www.sharp.com/locations/hospitals/sharp-mcdonald
Sharp Memorial Hospital	http://www.sharp.com/memorial/index.cfm
Sharp Mesa Vista Hospital	https://www.sharp.com/locations/hospitals/sharp-mesa-vista
Rady Children's Hospital-San Diego	http://www.rchsd.org
UC San Diego Medical Center	http://health.ucsd.edu/Pages/default.aspx
Urgent Care & More	http://www.urgentcaresandiego.com/
Villa Ranch Bernardo Care Center	http://ranchobernardocare.com/
Wow Hospitality Inc	
