= Birdland, San Diego =

- Community of San Diego
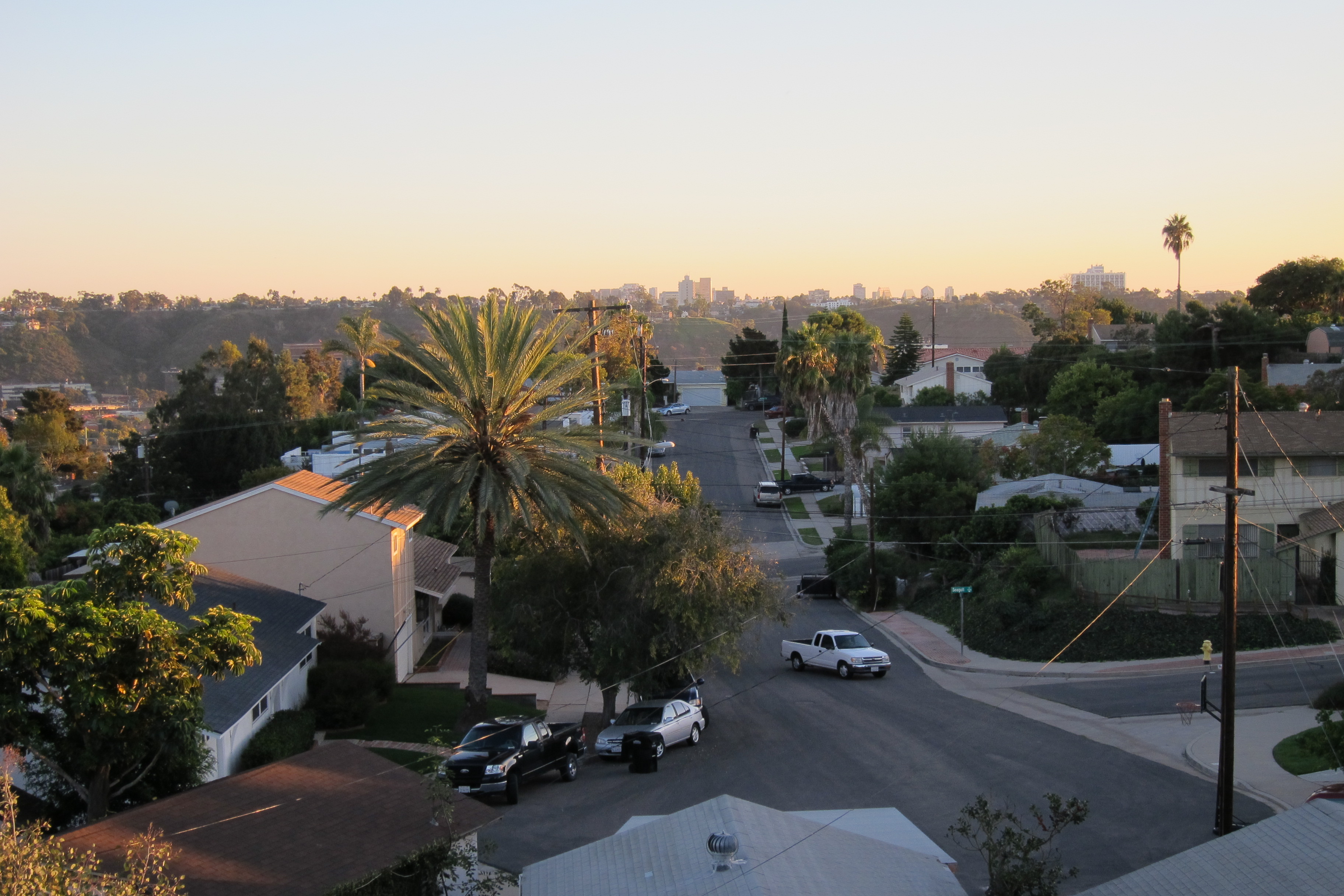
- View of Birdland from grounds of Fletcher Elementary School

- Location within Central San Diego Birdland, San Diego (California) Birdland, San Diego (the United States)
- Coordinates: 32.788861°N 117.155114°W
- Country: United States of America
- State: California
- County: San Diego
- City: San Diego

Birdland is a neighborhood in San Diego, California, United States. It is located between California State Route 163, Interstate 805 and Mission Valley. Most of the streets in the area are named after different bird species, (Note: Examples of "avian" streets: Talon Way and Bobolink Way. Meadow Lark Drive and Cardinal Dr. are among the longest. Kiwi St., Sea Gull Court and Blue Jay Place are short culs-de-sac.) hence the name of the community.

Birdland should not be confused with Bird Rock, a neighborhood of La Jolla, nor with the area of Mission Hills where the streets are also named for birds.

Although identified as a separate community, Birdland is within the city of San Diego’s Serra Mesa Planning Area.

Birdland is located in City Council District 7 and is currently represented by Councilmember Raul Campillo.

Most of Birdland was developed in the late 1950s and early 1960s. In planning documents, the area is identified as "El Dorado." While much of the neighborhood consists of single-family homes, there are also three large apartment communities.

The area is best known for its medical facilities, including:

- Donald N. Sharp Memorial Hospital
- Sharp Mary Birch Hospital for Women & Newborns
- Rady Children's Hospital
- Sharp Memorial Outpatient Pavilion
- Sharp Mesa Vista Hospital
- Ronald McDonald House Charities of San Diego

The area also houses San Diego Juvenile Hall, a juvenile detention facility.

== Education ==
The area is served by San Diego Unified School District. There is only one school in the neighborhood: Fletcher Elementary School. Older children who live in Birdland usually attend Montgomery Middle School and Kearny High School in nearby Linda Vista. The school district's supply center is located in Birdland.
