= Palomar =

Palomar is a Spanish word meaning dovecote. The term may refer to:

== Places ==
- Any of several locations in San Diego County, California:
  - Palomar Mountain
    - Palomar Mountain, California, an unincorporated community
  - Palomar College in San Marcos, California
    - Palomar College Transit Center
  - Palomar Health, a healthcare district covering a portion of the county
    - Palomar Medical Center Escondido in Escondido, California
    - Palomar Medical Center Poway in Poway, California
  - McClellan–Palomar Airport, informally referred to as just Palomar Airport, in Carlsbad, California
  - Palomar Street Transit Center in Chula Vista, California
- Palomar Ballroom, in Los Angeles, California
- Palomar (bar), in Portland, Oregon
- Palomar Hills, Lexington, a neighborhood in Lexington, Kentucky
- Hotel Palomar (Washington, D.C.)
- El Palomar, Buenos Aires, a city in Argentina
  - El Palomar (airbase), Argentina
- El Palomar, Valencia, a municipality in Spain
- Palomar de Arroyos, a town in Aragón, Spain

== Music ==
- Palomar (band), a band from Brooklyn, New York
- Palomar, a band formed by three members of Paw
- "Palomar", a 1992 song by the Rheostatics from Whale Music

== Astronomy ==
- Palomar Observatory, located on Palomar Mountain in San Diego County, California
  - National Geographic Society – Palomar Observatory Sky Survey, often known as just Palomar Observatory Sky Survey
  - Palomar Distant Solar System Survey
  - Palomar globular clusters, a set of globular clusters discovered by the POSS
  - Palomar–Leiden survey
  - Palomar Planet-Crossing Asteroid Survey
  - Palomar Testbed Interferometer
  - Palomar Transient Factory

== Other uses ==
- Palomar (comics), a 2003 graphic novel by Gilbert Hernandez
- Palomar Handicap, former name for the Yellow Ribbon Handicap, a horse race in Del Mar, California
- Palomar knot
- Palomar Pictures International, a subsidiary of ABC Pictures
- Palomar registry of verified mathematics
- Palomar S.p.A., an Italian television production company

== People with the surname ==
- Arnau de Palomar (fl. c. 1150), Catalan nobleman
- Daniel Palomar, electrical engineer
- Enrique de la Mora y Palomar (1907–1978), Mexican architect
- Jared Palomar, member of Augustana

== See also ==
- Mr. Palomar, a 1983 novel by Italo Calvino
- Palomares (disambiguation)
