= Palomares =

Palomares (Spanish for dovecotes) may refer to:

== Places ==
- Palomares, Almería, Spain
  - 1966 Palomares incident
- Palomares del Río, Seville, Spain
- Palomares del Campo, Cuenca, Spain
- Palomares de Béjar, Salamanca, Spain

== People ==
- Gabino Palomares (1950–2026), Mexican singer-songwriter and activist
- Ramón Palomares (1935–2016), Venezuelan poet

== Other ==
- HMS Palomares (WW2 British warship)
- Palacio del Marqués de Palomares (Seville)

== See also ==
- Palomar (disambiguation)
