= Incarceration of Daniel Chong =

DEA mistreatment incident

The incarceration of Daniel Chong was an incident in April 2012 in San Diego, California, when agents from the U.S. Drug Enforcement Administration (DEA) left a detained student locked in a holding room for five days. The cell contained no food, water or bathroom facilities. When he was found, he had to be hospitalized for several days for a variety of medical problems. The incident touched off a national furor, resulting in several investigations. The incident has been described as a "Kafkaesque nightmare," a "debacle," and "one of the worst cases of its kind."

Chong subsequently sued the DEA; the government settled the suit for $4.1 million.

== Incident ==
At the time of the incident, Daniel Chong was a 23-year-old student at the University of California, San Diego, a senior majoring in engineering, who is originally from Cerritos in Los Angeles County. On April 20, 2012, he was at a friend's apartment in the University City neighborhood of San Diego, where he and his friends were celebrating the 4/20 holiday, a day that refers to cannabis usage. The apartment was raided early on the morning of April 21 by the DEA, which seized marijuana, hallucinogenic mushrooms, and 18,000 ecstasy pills, along with guns and ammunition. Chong and eight other people were transported to the DEA field office in the Kearny Mesa neighborhood of San Diego, where they were interrogated.

Seven of the nine detainees were then taken to county jail, one was released, and Chong was accidentally left in a holding cell at the DEA office, according to the DEA. Chong says he was told that he had been in the wrong place at the wrong time and that he would be released and even given a ride home. He was placed in a 5 by 10 feet (1.5 m × 3.0 m) holding cell, his wrists bound in handcuffs. He was then left in the windowless cell for five days despite repeated cries for help. He could hear people walking around outside the room but could not get their attention. At one point the lights went off for several days. While locked up, he was starving and hallucinating. He claimed that, while incarcerated, he had to drink his own urine for hydration, and ingested some methamphetamine. The DEA has not explained how or why methamphetamines were left in a holding cell with Chong. At one point he bit the lens in his eyeglasses to break it, carved the phrase "sorry mom" in his arm with the shards, and swallowed the glass. By the time he was discovered on April 25, he was hallucinating and completely incoherent.

Upon his discovery on April 25, Chong was taken to Sharp Memorial Hospital in Serra Mesa where he remained for five days, including three in the intensive care unit. He was treated for various problems including dehydration, near-failure of his kidneys, and a perforated lung from eating broken glass. He was never charged with any crime.

Chong later returned to UC San Diego.

== DEA reaction ==
On April 27, an anonymous caller alleged to the Office of the Inspector General that the DEA was attempting to cover up the incident.

On May 2, DEA San Diego acting special agent-in-charge William R. Sherman issued a statement saying "I am deeply troubled by the incident that occurred here last week. I extend my deepest apologies to the young man and want to express that this event is not indicative of the high standards that I hold my employees to. I have personally ordered an extensive review of our policies and procedures."

== Other reactions ==
Senator Barbara Boxer (Democrat of California) called for an "immediate and thorough" investigation of the matter by the Department of Justice. Representative Darrell Issa (Republican of California) demanded a congressional investigation. Representative Duncan D. Hunter (Republican of California) asked the DEA for a full account of the incident as well as a report on detention policies and the steps the DEA is taking to address this and any other incidents.

San Diego NORML organized a protest outside the office at 4560 Viewridge Avenue on May 7, 2012, at 4:20. The student government at UCSD denounced the DEA over the incident and asked UCSD Chancellor Marye Anne Fox to take a "clear stand" on Chong's treatment.

== Chong's suit against DEA and settlement ==
Chong sued the Drug Enforcement Administration in May 2012, alleging that his treatment constituted torture under the law and seeking damages for pain and suffering, future medical and psychiatric treatment, and loss of future earnings.

In August 2013, Chong settled his claim against the DEA for $4.1 million.

== Inspector General's report ==
On July 8, 2014, the Office of the Inspector General (OIG) of the U.S. Justice Department issued a report on this case. The OIG said they intervened in the investigation because it appeared the local DEA office was investigating the matter on its own, contrary to protocol, and because at least two of the local agents who were investigating the case had been involved with Chong and thus had a conflict of interest. Among other findings, the OIG report (issued as an executive summary) said that Chong was seen or heard while trapped in the holding cell by four DEA agents, who did nothing because they assumed someone else was taking care of it. The report also charged that supervisors responded improperly and in a way that compromised any potential criminal prosecutions of agents at fault.

== DEA Internal review, punishment and aftermath ==
The DEA concluded its internal investigation of the incident in March 2015 and punished all six agents involved with letters of reprimand and additional suspensions of five and seven days, respectively, without pay, for two of them. Chong's lawyer, Gene Iredale, has expressed his disappointment over the punishments, labeling them "insufficient," a sentiment echoed by many lawmakers and administrators, including Congressman Ted Lieu (D-Los Angeles), who has called for a civil rights investigation into the case. The Department of Justice, in a letter to Congress, has also articulated its dismay, stating that such incommensurate penalties are symptomatic of institutional inadequacies with the DEA "disciplinary process" and promising forthcoming recommendations for its improvement. Congress has also vowed rectification of said process by giving the DEA "administrator more authority over civil service disciplinary rules;" DEA officials have blamed this lack of authority for their Agency's history of inadequately disciplining and punishing its employees. These concerns and promises voiced, however, only target improvements to the DEA's disciplinary process to punish employees for incidences, like that experienced by Chong, after the fact and not to any potential systemic problems that allow them to happen in the first place. These latter issues, DEA spokesperson Rusty Payne assures, have been fixed, and such an assurance appears to have placated most lawmakers and administrators for now.

The DEA said it has introduced national detention standards including daily inspections and cameras in cells.
