= David Melul Benarroch =

Spanish engineer (1928–2007)

David Melul Benarroch (20 April 1928 – 15 October 2007) was a Spanish Sephardic textile engineer, businessman and philanthropist. He is known for being the founder and patron of the David Melul Jewish Museum in Bejar (Salamanca), as well as for promoting cultural and educational projects related to the Jewish legacy in his native Melilla. He was the first Honorary Consul of the State of Israel in Barcelona and Honorary President of the Israeli Community in that city.
