= Poway, California =

City in California, United States

Poway, California Kepwaa (Kumiai)
- City
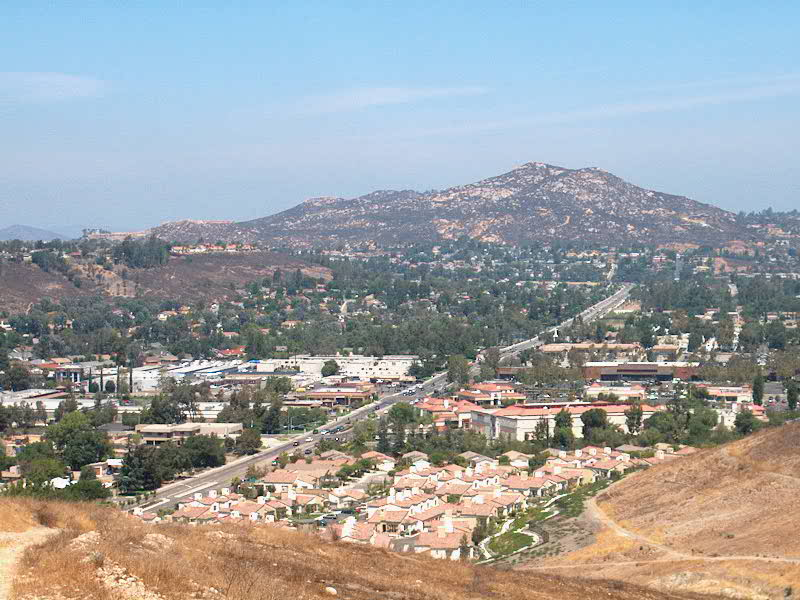
- The Twin Peaks above Poway in August 2004.

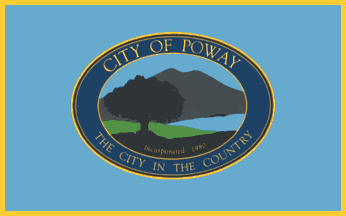
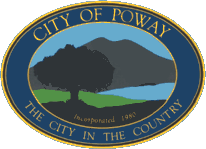
- Flag Seal
- Motto: "The City in the Country"
- Interactive map of Poway, California
- Location in the United States Poway, California (southern California) Poway, California (California) Poway, California (the United States)
- Coordinates: 32°58′12″N 117°02′19″W
- Country: United States
- State: California
- County: San Diego
- Incorporated: December 1, 1980

Government
  - Type: Council-Manager
  - City Council: Christopher Pikus, District 1 Vacant, District 2 Peter De Hoff, District 3 Jenny Maeda, District 4 (deputy mayor) Steve Vaus (mayor)
  - City manager: Chris Hazeltine

Area
  - Total: 39.17 sq mi (101.44 km^{2})
  - Land: 39.08 sq mi (101.21 km^{2})
  - Water: 0.085 sq mi (0.22 km^{2}) 0.22%
- Elevation: 515 ft (157 m)

Population (2020)
  - Total: 48,841
  - Density: 1,249.9/sq mi (482.57/km^{2})
- Demonym: Powegian
- Time zone: UTC−08:00 (PST)
  - Summer (DST): UTC−07:00 (PDT)
- ZIP Codes: 92064, 92074
- Area code: 858
- FIPS code: 06-58520
- GNIS feature IDs: 1661258, 2411480
- Website: www.poway.org

Poway (/ˈpaʊ.eɪ/; Kumiai: Kepwaa) is a city in San Diego County, California, United States. Poway's rural roots influenced its motto "The City in the Country". The city had a population of 48,841 as of the 2020 United States census.

Poway is part of San Diego's North County.

== History ==
The Kumeyaay people lived in the area for centuries before the Spanish colonization of the region. Artifacts such as arrowheads, spear points, metates, grinding stones, and pottery found along the bed of Poway Creek all indicate an early Kumeyaay presence. Various pictographs adorn many of Poway's boulders, and modern dating techniques suggest these paintings date to the 16th century and earlier.

=== European settlement ===
In the late 18th century, Mission San Diego de Alcalá kept cattle in the valley. Documents of Mission San Diego de Alcala record the name of the valley as "Paguay" as early as 1828. The name "Poway" is likely derived from a Kumeyaay term meaning "arrowhead" (pawii) or "watering hole" (paguay). Other sources suggest that "Paguay" means "the meeting of little valleys" or "end of the valley". Some controversy also surrounds the proper spelling; historically it has also been written by the Mexican authorities as Paguai. It has also been written as Paui, Pauai, Pauy, and Powaii.

For approximately a century, Poway served as a stock range for the mission and local ranchos. In September 1839, Corporal Rosario Aguilar was granted Rancho Paguai a ranch in the valley and it was confirmed on May 22, 1840, but he refused it, becoming juez de paz in 1841 and moving instead to San Juan Capistrano.

=== American settlement ===
American settlers began to come to the valley for farming purposes in the late antebellum period. Few records of this time have survived, and not until 1894 and the inception of the Poway Progress was the town's history regularly recorded. In 1887, about 800 people lived and farmed in Poway. Around the start of the 20th century, Poway farmers had moderate success in the production and vending of fruit, grain, and dairy products. The expansion, however, failed to follow agricultural success.

Poway has a creek and fertile soil, but the lack of easily available water prevented the settlement from attracting large-scale farmers and the accompanying population growth. In 1954 the Poway Municipal Water District was established to utilize water from the Colorado River Aqueduct. In 1957, following the sewer system's completion, developers built housing tracts.

It became a city on December 1, 1980. It was nicknamed "the City in the Country". Poway no longer relies on agriculture for its primary source of income and has instead transitioned into a residential community for those who work for employers in and around the San Diego area. According to a recent state government estimate, the population of Poway has grown since that last census to 50,542. It has been designated a "Tree City" for the last decade.

Major portions of the town were evacuated during both the 2003 Cedar Fire and 2007 Witch Creek Fire.

In 2004, the City of Poway adopted the 1st Light Armored Reconnaissance Battalion, 1st Marine Division, based out of nearby Camp Pendleton. The Fred L. Kent Post 7907 of the Veterans of Foreign Wars has been the official go-between with the battalion, which has been redeployed at least once to Iraq since its adoption.

The pop-punk bands Blink-182, Unwritten Law, Pivit and the Frights originated in Poway, California.

=== Agriculture ===
The Homestead Act of 1862 encouraged Westward migration, and many of Poway's first white settlers came to farm. The fecund soil proved well-suited to a variety of crops, including peaches, Muscat grapes, apricots, pears, hay, and alfalfa. Some farmers captured swarms of wild bees and cultivated honey. Dairying also proved lucrative. Most families kept a cow for milk and butter, chickens for eggs and meat, and perhaps a hog to sustain them while they farmed. Crops sold well around the San Diego area. Between the seasons of 1894 and 1896, the Poway Progress reported agricultural information:

Muscat grapes are beginning to ripen, and the San Diego market is getting a supply of the fine article Poway always produces. ... The season has been a prolific one for bees, thirty of forty stands the present season from a single captured swarm a year or two ago. ... The peach is a good article, and Poway produces it to perfection. Poway pears will compare with any grown in the state.

The success of these crops depended on the annual winter rainfall, and remained subject to variations in precipitation until the establishment of the Poway Municipal Water District in 1954. With water readily available, the town's farming interest shifted to two principal crops: avocados and citrus fruits. With water came new residents, and the former farm town transformed into a locale full of small commercial businesses and shopping centers.

=== Religion ===
The Community Church of Poway, the town's first church, has remained in operation since 1887, making it the house of worship with the longest continual operation in San Diego County. Living Way Church, a non-denominational Protestant church, through Berean Bible College, is the only church currently in Poway that offers Bible college classes. There are two Catholic churches in Poway: St. Michael's and St. Gabriel's.

There is a Jewish community, with a Reform synagogue, a Conservative synagogue, and an Orthodox synagogue. On April 27, 2019, the Orthodox synagogue, Chabad of Poway, was the site of an attack in which four people were shot—one of whom was killed—during Passover services.

A Sikh temple, one of several in San Diego County, is found in Poway. Two Kingdom Halls of Jehovah's Witnesses are located in Poway. There are nine congregations of the Church of Jesus Christ of Latter-day Saints located in Poway that meet in three meetinghouses.

=== Education ===
Poway established its school district in 1871, but did not have a schoolhouse until 1885, when a one-room school was built at Midland Road about a 2–3-minute walk south of the Templar's Hall. The site is still in use today as an elementary school (Kindergarten through 5th grade), though it was torn down and rebuilt in 1945, and renovated again in 2004–2006. First through eighth graders were included in one classroom. Children learned to read and write using slates, and eventually progressed to study subjects such as arithmetic, spelling, English, language (German or Latin), grammar, history, and geography. Students did not usually attend high school, and had to travel to Escondido if they wished to do so. In 1909, only three students from Poway graduated from high school. Women who went on to more school from there usually had teaching ambitions. Education, while compulsory and considered a worthwhile pastime, had few far-reaching applications for Poway's farmers' children. Enrollment in the Poway School 1st–8th grades did not reach 100 until 1932.

=== Transportation ===
Poway's transportation history parallels that of the rest of early California. In 1888, the first stagecoach began to serve the towns from San Diego to Escondido, including Poway. The stage made one stop in town, at the Poway Post Office, and also delivered mail to the farmers who would wait along the road for its arrival. The men would trot alongside the coach and inquire as to the state of the mail and thus receive letters without requiring it to stop. Eight to ten passengers could accompany the stagecoach on its three-day journey for a modest $1.00 fee, or purchase a round trip for the bargain price of $1.50. The route itself, though not treacherous when passing through Poway, did pose a significant challenge to the team and driver at various points. Windy mountain trails often caused the stage to turn over, spilling both mail and passengers onto the rocky turf. The city of San Diego discontinued the stage line in 1912, when the advent of the automobile facilitated an easier and less time-consuming method of mail delivery. Poway established a County Road Station in 1920 to oil and maintain the roads so that automobiles could use them with ease. The road station remained in operation until 1961, when Poway achieved an 80% paved road rate. To this day, though, the town still boasts a number of dirt roads, for use by cars, horses, bikes, and pedestrians. Portions of what is currently Pomerado Road, a major north–south artery, were once U.S. Route 395 in California.

=== Water ===
Poway's greatest change started in the 1950s when water came to the valley. On January 29, 1954, an election was held on the formation of the Poway Municipal Water District, which passed with an overwhelming majority of 210 ayes to 32 nays. At the second election on March 25, 1954, the citizens voted to annex to the San Diego County Water Authority. At a third election held April 22, 1954, the citizens voted to incur bonded debt of $600,000 to build a water system. The first water delivery was made in July 1954 to Gordon's Grocery on Garden Road. In 1972 Poway Dam was built to provide a dependable supply of water.

In 1957, the Pomerado County Water District was organized to provide sewer service to 1,610 acres (6.5 km^{2}) along Pomerado Road. In 1959 the first subdivision homes were built and sold as Poway Valley Homes and Poway's population began to climb. On December 1, 1980, the City of Poway incorporated and the two districts, Poway Municipal Water and Pomerado County Water, became part of the City structure. The district issued a restriction for watering lawns. It allowed people to water their lawns three days a week. After a short time, restrictions were lifted.

== Geography ==
Poway is east of the city of San Diego and south of the city of Escondido. Nearby communities include Rancho Bernardo, Sabre Springs, Scripps Ranch, Rancho Peñasquitos, and Ramona to the east.

According to the United States Census Bureau, the city covers an area of 39.2 square miles (102 km^{2}), 99.78% of it land, and 0.22% of it water. The confluence of the 33rd parallel north and 117th meridian west is located on a hillside in a private property.

=== Climate ===
Poway has a borderline semi-arid climate (Köppen: Bsh) and hot-summer Mediterranean climate (Köppen: Csa) with hot summers and cool, wet winters.

Climate data for Poway Valley, CA (extremes from weather.com)
Month	Jan	Feb	Mar	Apr	May	Jun	Jul	Aug	Sep	Oct	Nov	Dec	Year
Record high °F (°C)	95 (35)	96 (36)	100 (38)	103 (39)	105 (41)	110 (43)	114 (46)	112 (44)	111 (44)	105 (41)	100 (38)	92 (33)	114 (46)
Mean daily maximum °F (°C)	67 (19)	67 (19)	70 (21)	72 (22)	76 (24)	81 (27)	82 (28)	81 (27)	77 (25)	72 (22)	68 (20)	67 (19)	73 (23)
Mean daily minimum °F (°C)	44 (7)	45 (7)	49 (9)	53 (12)	57 (14)	61 (16)	62 (17)	61 (16)	55 (13)	48 (9)	46 (8)	43 (6)	52 (11)
Record low °F (°C)	22 (−6)	25 (−4)	28 (−2)	31 (−1)	39 (4)	43 (6)	45 (7)	46 (8)	39 (4)	35 (2)	26 (−3)	23 (−5)	22 (−6)
Average precipitation inches (mm)	2.69 (68)	3.02 (77)	2.41 (61)	0.97 (25)	0.26 (6.6)	0.10 (2.5)	0.03 (0.76)	0.09 (2.3)	0.20 (5.1)	0.57 (14)	1.28 (33)	1.93 (49)	13.55 (344)
Source 1:
Source 2: weather.com(extremes) NOAA(precipitation)

== Demographics ==
Historical population
Census	Pop.	Note	%±
1960	1,921		—
1970	9,422		390.5%
1980	32,263		242.4%
1990	43,516		34.9%
2000	48,044		10.4%
2010	47,811		−0.5%
2020	48,841		2.2%
U.S. Decennial Census; 1860–1870 1880-1890; 1900 1910 1920; 1930 1940 1950; 1960 1970 1980; 1990 2000 2010; 2020

=== Racial and ethnic composition ===
Poway city, California – Racial and ethnic composition Note: the US Census treats Hispanic/Latino as an ethnic category. This table excludes Latinos from the racial categories and assigns them to a separate category. Hispanics/Latinos may be of any race.
Race / Ethnicity (NH = Non-Hispanic)	Pop 2000	Pop 2010	Pop 2020	% 2000	% 2010	% 2020
White alone (NH)	37,092	33,041	28,896	77.20%	69.11%	59.16%
Black or African American alone (NH)	752	722	663	1.57%	1.51%	1.36%
Native American or Alaska Native alone (NH)	159	149	81	0.33%	0.31%	0.17%
Asian alone (NH)	3,530	4,750	6,643	7.35%	9.93%	13.60%
Native Hawaiian or Pacific Islander alone (NH)	127	101	107	0.26%	0.21%	0.22%
Other race alone (NH)	97	74	240	0.20%	0.15%	0.49%
Mixed race or Multiracial (NH)	1,313	1,466	3,194	2.73%	3.07%	6.54%
Hispanic or Latino (any race)	4,974	7,508	9,017	10.35%	15.70%	18.46%
Total	48,044	47,811	48,841	100.00%	100.00%	100.00%

=== 2020 census ===
As of the 2020 census, Poway had a population of 48,841 and a population density of 1,249.8 inhabitants per square mile (482.6/km^{2}). The age distribution was 23.1% under the age of 18, 7.6% aged 18 to 24, 23.0% aged 25 to 44, 28.1% aged 45 to 64, and 18.1% aged 65 or older. The median age was 42.0 years. For every 100 females, there were 97.0 males, and for every 100 females age 18 and over, there were 93.6 males.

The census reported that 98.8% of the population lived in households, 0.6% lived in non-institutionalized group quarters, and 0.7% were institutionalized. 96.1% of residents lived in urban areas, while 3.9% lived in rural areas.

There were 16,383 households, out of which 37.6% had children under the age of 18 living in them. Of all households, 65.4% were married-couple households, 4.3% were cohabiting couple households, 19.4% had a female householder with no spouse or partner present, and 10.9% had a male householder with no spouse or partner present. About 14.5% of households were one person, and 7.9% had someone living alone who was 65 years of age or older. The average household size was 2.94. There were 13,198 families (80.6% of all households).

There were 16,877 housing units at an average density of 431.9 units per square mile (166.8 units/km^{2}), of which 16,383 (97.1%) were occupied. Of occupied units, 75.1% were owner-occupied and 24.9% were renter-occupied. 2.9% of housing units were vacant, with a homeowner vacancy rate of 0.4% and a rental vacancy rate of 3.7%.

=== 2023 American Community Survey ===
In 2023, the US Census Bureau estimated that 17.8% of the population were foreign-born. Of all people aged 5 or older, 75.6% spoke only English at home, 9.9% spoke Spanish, 4.6% spoke other Indo-European languages, 8.2% spoke Asian or Pacific Islander languages, and 1.8% spoke other languages. Of those aged 25 or older, 93.8% were high school graduates and 53.4% had a bachelor's degree.

The median household income in 2023 was $143,825, and the per capita income was $62,061. About 2.7% of families and 5.2% of the population were below the poverty line.

=== 2010 census ===
The 2010 United States census reported that Poway had a population of 47,811. The population density was 1,220.7 inhabitants per square mile (471.3/km^{2}). The racial makeup of Poway was 36,781 (76.9%) White, 783 (1.6%) African American, 265 (0.6%) Native American, 4,853 (10.2%) Asian, 106 (0.2%) Pacific Islander, 2,944 (6.2%) from other races, and 2,079 (4.3%) from two or more races. Hispanic or Latino people of any race numbered 7,508 (15.7%).

The Census reported that 47,261 people (98.8% of the population) lived in households, 284 (0.6%) lived in non-institutionalized group quarters, and 266 (0.6%) were institutionalized.

There were 16,128 households, out of which 6,493 (40.3%) had children under the age of 18 living in them, 10,523 (65.2%) were opposite-sex married couples living together, 1,675 (10.4%) had a female householder with no husband present, 742 (4.6%) had a male householder with no wife present. There were 580 (3.6%) unmarried opposite-sex partnerships, and 111 (0.7%) same-sex married couples or partnerships; 2,469 households (15.3%) were made up of individuals, and 1,185 (7.3%) had someone living alone who was 65 years of age or older. The average household size was 2.93. There were 12,940 families (80.2% of all households); the average family size was 3.23.

In the city, 11,948 people (25.0%) were under the age of 18, 3,912 people (8.2%) were 18 to 24, 10,496 people (22.0%) 25 to 44, 15,555 people (32.5%) 45 to 64, and 5,900 people (12.3%) were 65 years of age or older. The median age was 41.3 years. For every 100 females, there were 97.1 males. For every 100 females age 18 and over, there were 94.5 males.

There were 16,715 housing units at an average density of 426.8 units per square mile (164.8 units/km^{2}), of which 12,000 (74.4%) were owner-occupied, and 4,128 (25.6%) were occupied by renters. The homeowner vacancy rate was 1.1%; the rental vacancy rate was 5.5%. 35,111 people (73.4% of the population) lived in owner-occupied housing units and 12,150 people (25.4%) lived in rental housing units.

== Economy ==
=== Top employers ===
According to the city's 2019 Comprehensive Annual Financial Report, the top ten employers in the city are:

#	Employer	# of Employees
1	General Atomics Aeronautical Systems	7,160
2	Geico Direct	1,720
3	Poway Unified School District	1,366
4	Delta Design, Inc.	750
5	Pomerado Hospital	740
6	Mitchell Repair Information Company	400
7	Sysco	385
8	Walmart	370
9	Arch Health Partners	300
10	Costco Wholesale	295

== Parks and recreation ==
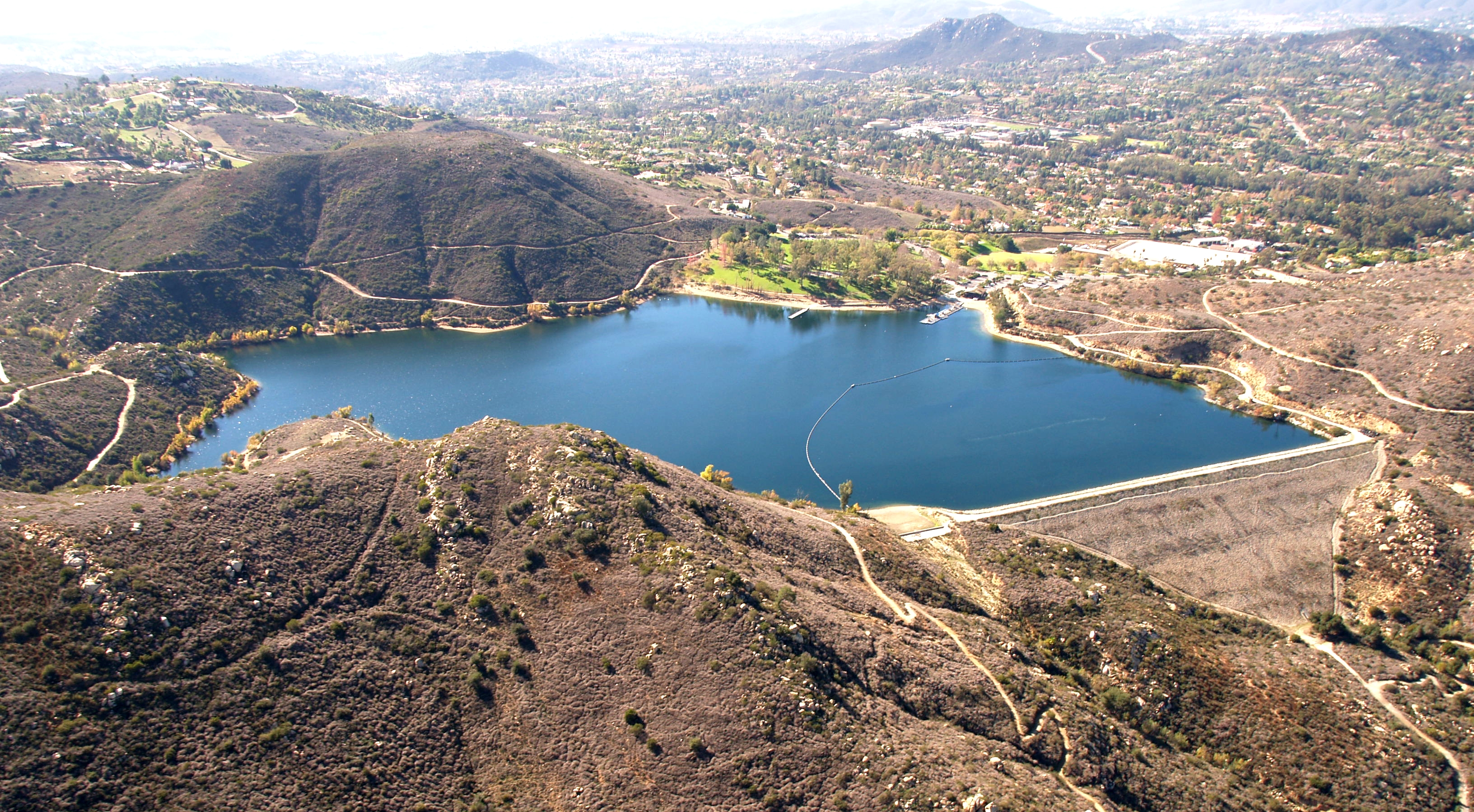
Lake Poway as seen from a helicopter in 2012

- Aubrey Park
- Blue Sky Ecological Reserve
- Old Poway Park (home to the Poway–Midland Railroad and Poway Historical and Memorial Society)
- Starridge Park
- Poway Community Park
- Lake Poway

=== Hiking trails ===
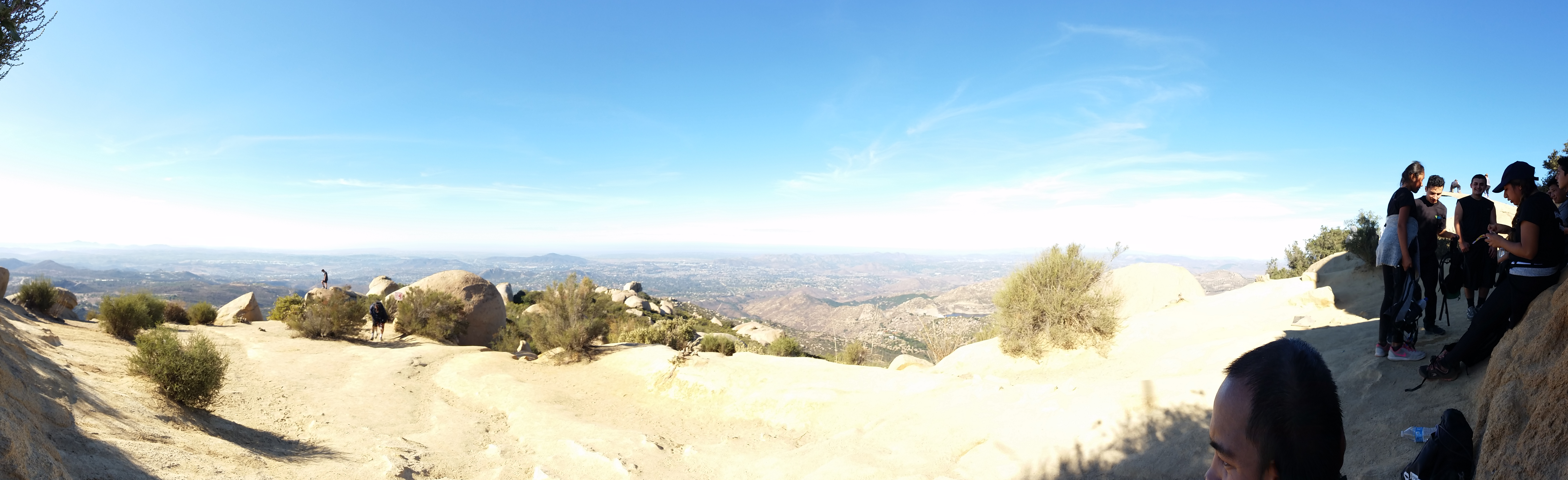
The view west of Potato Chip Rock, on Mount Woodson Trail, including Poway

- Interpretive Center at Pauwai
- Sycamore Canyon Preserve and Goodan Ranch
- City of Poway Trails

== Government ==
Poway incorporated as a general law city in December 1980. Like most California cities, it uses a council/manager form of government. City policies are set by a five-member city council which includes a directly elected mayor. The mayor and councilmembers are elected at-large to overlapping four-year terms. Council appoints the deputy mayor, the city attorney, and the city manager.

=== State and federal representation ===
In the California State Legislature, Poway is in the 40th senatorial district, represented by Republican Brian Jones, and in the 75th Assembly district, represented by Republican Carl DeMaio.

In the United States House of Representatives, Poway is in California's 48th congressional district, represented by Republican Darrell Issa.

=== County representation ===
In the San Diego County Board of Supervisors, Poway is in County Supervisor District 2 East County and is represented by Joel Anderson.

== Education ==
Presently, the Poway Unified School District (PUSD) has grown to twenty-five elementary schools (kindergarten to 5th grade), six middle schools (6th–8th grades), six high (9th–12th grades) schools, a home-schooling program, and a K–8 school. PUSD has a record of high performance. One of its students, Anurag Kashyap (an eighth-grader at the time), became the 2005 National Spelling Bee champion after winning on the word "appoggiatura". Poway Adult School was established in 1963 by the Poway Unified School District. Poway Adult School is a provider of adult education services in the City of Poway and its surrounding communities. Poway Adult School offers adult education courses for adults in the areas of high school diploma, GED, HISET, adult basic education, ESL, parenting classes, community education courses, and career technical education courses (CTE). Poway Adult School also offers a robust selection of short-term CTE courses in certified nurse assistant, real estate, court reporting, financing, computers, and more. Poway Adult School offers a wide range of community education courses for the community such as yoga, music classes, and much more. Poway Adult School is a member of the Education to Career Network of North San Diego County. ETCN is one of 71 consortiums in California and is funded by the California Adult Education Program.

=== Poway High School ===
Poway High School operates as part of the Poway Unified School District. The school's athletic teams, the Titans, participate in wrestling, lacrosse, baseball, softball, water polo, football, cross country, and 11 other sports.

== Infrastructure ==
The San Diego Metropolitan Transit System (MTS) operates public transportation in Poway. MTS routes 944 and 945 connect the city to the Sabre Springs and Rancho Bernardo transit centers.

== Notable people ==
- Miguel Berry, soccer player
- Bruce Bochy, former Major League Baseball catcher and manager of the San Diego Padres, San Francisco Giants, and Texas Rangers
- Fletcher Bowron, mayor of Los Angeles 1938–53
- Tom Brunansky, former Major League Baseball outfielder
- Lloyd M. Bucher, U.S. naval officer, commanding officer of USS Pueblo (AGER-2)
- Jeromy Burnitz, former Major League Baseball outfielder
- Brian Patrick Butler, actor and filmmaker
- David Buttolph, American film composer who scored over 300 movies[1] and TV shows in his career
- Brandon Call, actor, Step By Step, Baywatch
- Luis Castillo, former defensive end for the San Diego Chargers
- Tom DeLonge, guitarist/singer of the rock band Blink-182, also known for Box Car Racer and Angels & Airwaves
- Alex Dickerson (born 1990), Major League Baseball outfielder for the Atlanta Braves
- Lauren Elaine, celebrity fashion designer, actress, and model, known for her movie roles and appearances in Dierks Bentley's music videos
- Roger Guy English, Guinness World Record holder
- Antonio Gates, former tight end for the San Diego/Los Angeles Chargers
- David Goeddel, biotechnologist and scientist
- Molly Grabill, marathon runner
- Tony Gwynn, member of Baseball Hall of Fame, retired San Diego Padres star, and former manager of SDSU Aztecs baseball team
- Christy Hemme, actress, model, and former professional wrestler
- Charley Hoffman, PGA Tour professional golfer
- Mary Ann Horton, computer expert
- Connor Joe, Major League Baseball outfielder
- David Justice, former Major League Baseball outfielder
- Anurag Kashyap, winner of the 2005 Scripps National Spelling Bee and 2008 Teen Jeopardy Tournament
- Aimee La Joie, actress and TikToker
- Lorenzo Lamas, actor
- Bobby Lee, actor and stand-up comedian
- Shawne Merriman, former outside linebacker for the San Diego Chargers and Buffalo Bills
- Trevi Moran, singer and YouTube personality
- Phil Nevin, former Major League Baseball player for the San Diego Padres
- Tyler Nevin, former Major League Baseball player playing in Nippon Professional Baseball as of 2025.
- Shaun Phillips, former National Football League outside linebacker for the San Diego Chargers
- Kelsey Plum, professional basketball player for the Los Angeles Sparks in the WNBA
- Scott Raynor, original drummer of the rock band Blink-182
- Mark Risley, Emmy-winning director
- Scott Simpson, former PGA golfer and 1987 U.S. Open Champion
- Jeff Smith, American player of gridiron football
- Jesse Taylor, MMA fighter
- Lindsay Taylor, professional basketball player
- Unwritten Law, punk rock band
- Steve Vaus (aka Buck Howdy), four-time Grammy Award nominee, 2010 Grammy winner; elected Mayor of Poway in 2014
- Nick Vincent (born 1986), Major League Baseball pitcher in the Minnesota Twins organization, former San Diego Padres player
- Matt Wilhelm, former National Football League middle linebacker for the San Diego Chargers

== See also ==
- San Diego County, California
