= Independent Highlander Group =

Political group in Salamanca, Spain

Independent Highlander Group (Agrupación Serrana Independiente -ASI- in Spanish) is a people group who created a candidature for the local elections carried out in Spain on 22 May 2011, for the village of Santibáñez de la Sierra, in the province of Salamanca. This candidature was registered in the Electoral Committee of Béjar’s Area.

The Independent Highlander Group (ASI), formed by Francisco Aguadero Fernández, José Carlos Martín Sánchez, Francisco Javier Martín Maíllo and Eloy Nieto Panchuelo, got the absolute majority in the Council of Santibáñez de la Sierra, with 95 votes (52,78%) against 51 votes (28,33%) for the PP (conservatives) and 31 (17,22%) for PSOE (socialists).

These results were translated, by the open lists electoral system valid in the villages that have less of 250 inhabitants (group where Santibáñez de la Sierra is now inserted, with 223 inhabitants in 2010), in the 4 councillors election for the Independent Highlander Group (ASI) and 1 for the People's Party (PP). The Spanish Socialist Workers' Party (PSOE) didn’t get representation in the highlander council.

In the night of 11 June 2011, after a day of cherries harvest in the village, the Council of Santibáñez de la Sierra for 2011-2015 legislature was constituted and Francisco Aguadero Fernández, from Independent Highlander Group (ASI), was designated new Mayor of Santibáñez de la Sierra.
