= Health care districts in California =

Type of California special district

Health care districts are California special districts created to build and operate hospitals and other health care facilities and services in underserved areas. As of 2019, there are 79 health care districts in California. Each health care district is governed by a locally elected five-member board of directors. Palomar Health in San Diego County is the largest district in California.

In 1945, the California Legislature passed the Local Hospital District Law which authorized the special districts. Most of the current health care districts were established in the first two decades thereafter. In 1965, the Legislature passed the District Reorganization Act of 1965 which made changes to the law. In 1994, they were renamed as "health care districts", reflecting that health care was increasingly being provided outside of the hospital setting.

== Powers and functions ==
Authority granted to health care districts includes:

- Operating health care facilities such as hospitals, clinics, skilled nursing facilities (SNF), adult day health centers, nurses' training school, and child care facilities.
- Operating ambulance services within and outside of the district.
- Operating programs that provide chemical dependency services, health education, wellness and prevention, rehabilitation, and aftercare.
- Carrying out activities through corporations, joint ventures, or partnerships.
- Establishing or participating in managed care.
- Contracting with and making grants to provider groups and clinics in the community.
- Other activities that are necessary for the maintenance of good physical and mental health in communities served by the district.

== Community-based health districts ==
- Beach Cities Health District, Redondo Beach
- Camarillo Health District, Camarillo
- Corning Healthcare District, Corning
- Del Norte Healthcare District, Crescent City
- Desert Healthcare District, Palm Springs
- Eden Township Healthcare District, Castro Valley
- Fallbrook Healthcare District, Fallbrook
- Grossmont Healthcare District, La Mesa
- Los Medanos Community Healthcare District, Pittsburg
- Marin Healthcare District, Greenbrae
- Mark Twain Health Care District, San Andreas
- Mount Diablo Healthcare District, Concord
- Palo Verde Health Care District, Blythe
- Peninsula Health Care District, Burlingame
- Petaluma Health Care District, Petaluma
- Redbud Health Care District, Clearlake
- Sequoia Health Care District, Redwood City
- West Side Healthcare District, Newman
- West Contra Costa Healthcare District

== Rural districts operating hospitals ==
- Bear Valley Community Healthcare District, Big Bear Lake
- Chowchilla Memorial Hospital District, Chowchilla
- Coalinga Hospital District, Coalinga
- Corcoran Hospital District, Corcoran
- Eastern Plumas Healthcare District, Portola
- Hi-Desert Memorial Health Care District, Joshua Tree
- John C. Fremont Healthcare District, Mariposa
- Kern Valley Healthcare District, Lake Isabella
- Kingsburg District Hospital, Kingsburg
- Lompoc Healthcare District, Lompoc
- Mayers Memorial Hospital District, Fall River Mills
- Mendocino Coast Healthcare District, Fort Bragg
- North Sonoma County Hospital District, Healdsburg
- Northern Inyo Healthcare District, Bishop
- Oak Valley Hospital District, Oakdale
- Palm Drive Health Care District, Sebastopol
- Pioneers Memorial Healthcare District, Brawley
- Plumas District Hospital, Quincy
- San Benito Health Care District, Hollister
- San Bernardino Mountains Community Hospital District, Lake Arrowhead
- San Gorgonio Memorial Health Care District, Banning
- Seneca Healthcare District, Chester
- Sierra Kings Health Care District, Reedley
- Sierra View District Hospital, Porterville
- Sonoma Valley Health Care District, Sonoma
- Southern Humboldt Community Healthcare District, Garberville
- Southern Inyo Healthcare District, Lone Pine
- Southern Mono Healthcare District, Mammoth Lakes
- Surprise Valley Health Care District, Cedarville
- Tahoe Forest Hospital District, Truckee
- Tehachapi Valley Healthcare District, Tehachapi
- Tulare District Healthcare System, Tulare

== Non-rural district operating hospitals ==
- Antelope Valley Healthcare District, Lancaster
- City of Alameda Health Care District, Alameda
- El Camino Hospital District, Mountain View
- Heffernan Memorial Hospital District, Calexico
- Kaweah Delta Health Care District, Visalia
- Palomar Health, San Diego County
- Salinas Valley Memorial Healthcare System, Salinas
- Tri-City Healthcare District, Oceanside
- Valley Health System, Hemet
- Washington Township Health Care District, Fremont

== Districts operating skilled-nursing facilities ==
- North Kern South Tulare Hospital District, Delano
- Soledad Community Health Care District, Soledad
- Eastern Plumas Health Care District, Portola, CA
- Mountain Communities Healthcare District, Trinity Hospital, Weaverville, CA
- Bear Valley Community Healthcare District, Big Bear Lake, CA
- Kern Valley Healthcare District, Lake Isabella, CA
- Southern Humboldt Community Healthcare District, Jerold Phelps Community Hospital SNF, Garberville CA

== Districts operating ambulances ==
- Cambria Community Health District, Cambria
- Cloverdale Health Care District, Cloverdale
- Del Puerto Health Care District, Patterson
- Muroc Healthcare District, Boron
- Oak Valley Hospital District, Oakdale
- West Side Community Healthcare District, Newman
- Eastern Plumas Healthcare District, Portola, CA

== Districts operating clinics ==
- Bloss Memorial Healthcare District, Atwater
- Del Puerto Health Care District, Patterson
- Mendocino Coast Healthcare District, Fort Bragg
- Northern Inyo Healthcare District, Bishop
- Soledad Community Health Care District, Soledad
- Kern Valley Healthcare District; Mountain View Health Center, Mountain Mesa
- Southern Humboldt Community Healthcare District, SoHum Health Community Clinic, Garberville

== See also ==
- Local government in California
