= San Diego Radiosurgery =

Coordinates: 33.1247°N 117.0758°W

- Industry: Healthcare
- Founded: October 2008
- Headquarters: 555 East Valley Parkway Escondido, CA, Escondido, California, United States
- Key people: Medical Director: Dr. Lori A. Coleman Radiation Oncologist: Dr. Brian Volpp

San Diego Radiosurgery is a cancer treatment facility in Escondido, California. The center is a service of Palomar Health.

San Diego Radiosurgery uses a technology called Novalis Tx. Novalis Tx is a stereotactic radiosurgery platform that does not require anesthesia or incision for treatment of malignant and benign tumors. The center treats tumors in the lung, liver, brain, kidney, eye, prostate, and pancreas.

In January 2010, San Diego Radiosurgery was one of the first facilities in the country to have respiratory gating technology. This technology protects tissues and organs around a tumor using targeted positioning and precise dosage.
