= Mesa Vista =

Mesa Vista can refer to:

- Mesa Vista, California, a town
- Sharp Mesa Vista Hospital, a psychiatric hospital
