= Cliff Hicks =

American football player (born 1964)

No. 23, 28, 27, 25
- Position: Defensive back

Personal information
- Born: August 18, 1964 (age 62); San Diego, California, U.S.
- Listed height: 5 ft 10 in (1.78 m)
- Listed weight: 188 lb (85 kg)

Career information
- High school: Kearny (San Diego)
- College: Oregon
- NFL draft: 1987: 3rd round, 74th overall pick

Career history
- Los Angeles Rams (1987–1990); Buffalo Bills (1990–1992); New York Jets (1993); Los Angeles Rams (1994)*; New York Jets (1994); San Francisco 49ers (1995)*; Denver Broncos (1995)
- * Offseason or practice squad member only

Career NFL statistics
- Tackles: 72
- Interceptions: 5
- Fumble recoveries: 3
- Return yards: 1,438
- Stats at Pro Football Reference

Clifford Wendell Hicks Jr. (born August 18, 1964) is an American former professional football player who was a defensive back for four National Football League (NFL) teams from 1987 to 1995. Before his NFL career, he played college football for the Oregon Ducks and was selected by the Los Angeles Rams in the third round of the 1987 NFL draft.

Pre-draft measurables
Height	Weight	Arm length	Hand span	40-yard dash	10-yard split	20-yard split	20-yard shuttle	Vertical jump	Broad jump	Bench press
5 ft 9 3/8 in (1.76 m)	192 lb (87 kg)	29 1/2 in (0.75 m)	9 in (0.23 m)	4.50 s	1.53 s	2.60 s	4.34 s	31.5 in (0.80 m)	9 ft 8 in (2.95 m)	8 reps
All values from NFL Combine

Prior to playing in the NFL he attended Kearny High School in San Diego California where he currently resides.
