= Berean Bible College =

Defunct Christian college in California

- Type: Private Undergraduate College
- Established: 1971
- Founders: George and Rita Evans
- President: Rev. Douglas Balcombe
- Administrative staff: 10
- Students: 25
- Location: 13609 Twin Peaks Road; Poway, CA 92064, Poway, California, United States; 42°55′10″N 85°41′32″W
- Campus: Suburban, 1 acre
- CEEB Code: None
- Colors: None
- Nickname: Living Way Church
- Mascot: None
- Website: www.bereanbibleinstitute.org

Berean Bible College was a non-accredited Christian college in Poway, California, United States. It is affiliated with the Living Way Church, which is a non-denominational Christian church. The college closed permanently in 2018.

== History ==
Founded by George and Rita Evans in September 1971, Berean Bible College started their classes in San Diego, California.

In 1991, Berean Bible College moved its campus to Living Way Church in Poway, California. The president was Rev. Douglas Balcombe, Senior Pastor Emeritus of Living Way Church. The Dean of the College was Daniel Haney until 1993. At that time, due to a church split in the home church of the College, Daniel Haney was relieved of duty, though he had nothing to do with the split. Shortly after, Robert San Miguel was selected to fulfill the role of Dean

In Fall 2012, Berean Bible College's first satellite campus opened in Maui; on-site classes at this campus were subsequently discontinued. Until its closure Berean Bible College offered both on-site education at its Poway campus and distance learning

Berean Bible College was a small community bible college. Classes were held Monday and Tuesday evenings, with a chapel service on Tuesdays. Distance learning courses were accessible at any time to those enrolled in the class.

In 2018 the college closed permanently.

== Academics ==
Classes were offered on Monday and Tuesday nights. There were also correspondence elective classes that a full-time student may have needed to take in order to be classified as full-time. Upon successful completion of the prescribed classes and elective units required to graduate, students were awarded an associate's degree (2nd-year student), a certificate of theology (3rd-year students), or a bachelor's of theology degree (4th-year students).

There were four major courses of study offered at Berean Bible College, including a ministerial program.
