= Rancho Paguai =

Mexican land grant in California

Coordinates: 32°57′08″N 117°02′53″W

Rancho Paguai, named by the Mexicans after a local Kumeyaay village, was located in what is now the valley of Poway Creek and Poway Valley. It was a Mexican land grant rancho, granted by Governor Juan Alvarado on September 7, 1839, and confirmed May 22, 1840, to Rosario E. Aguilar a former Corporal of the San Diego Mission guard and the Majordomo of the Mission in 1838. However, Aguilar did not occupy or improve it and so forfeited the grant. He, having received an appointment as Juez de paz in 1841, afterward moved to San Juan Capistrano and took up land there. Details on the extent of the rancho are unknown.

The city of Poway, California, later developed on the land of this rancho that never came to fruition.
