= Jim Smith (defensive back) =

American football player (born 1946)

No. 34
- Position: Safety

Personal information
- Born: November 4, 1946 (age 80); Yazoo City, Mississippi, U.S.
- Listed height: 6 ft 3 in (1.91 m)
- Listed weight: 195 lb (88 kg)

Career information
- High school: Kearny (San Diego, California)
- College: Oregon (1964-1967)
- NFL draft: 1968: 1st round, 12th overall pick

Career history
- Washington Redskins (1968)

Awards and highlights
- First-team All-American (1967); 2× First-team All-Pac-8 (1966, 1967)

Career NFL statistics
- Fumble recoveries: 3
- Kick/punt return yards: 99
- Touchdowns: 1
- Stats at Pro Football Reference

James McCoy Smith (born November 4, 1946) is an American former professional football player who was a defensive back for the Washington Redskins of the National Football League (NFL). He played high school football at Kearny High School in San Diego and college football for the Oregon Ducks. He was nicknamed "Yazoo" because he was born in Yazoo City, Mississippi. He was an All-American his senior year (1967), and was selected in the first round of the 1968 NFL/AFL draft. He was the first defensive back taken in the draft, and the twelfth player overall.

He played all 14 games during his rookie season, but his career ended after one year because of a severe neck injury.

After his career was cut short, Smith sued the NFL and the Redskins in federal court on the grounds that the draft was a violation of the Sherman Antitrust Act. He argued that he would have gotten a better deal if he could have negotiated with all teams instead of just one. He also sued for personal injuries.

Smith was awarded treble damages in the amount of $276,600. The Redskins paid him $50,000 for his first season, and an additional $19,800 for an option year on his rookie contract, for a total of $69,800. However, the district court found that he should have gotten a 3-year contract worth $162,200, like his free-agent veteran teammate Pat Fischer, who was also a defensive back. Smith's lawsuit was successful both at the federal district court level and appellate level and was eventually settled in 1979. In the meantime, the NFL agreed with the NFL Players Association to restructure the draft so it would no longer violate the antitrust laws.
