= Rosario E. Aguilar =

Spanish settler of San Diego, California, (1792–1847)

- Born: Rosario E. Aguilar c. 1792; Spain
- Died: 1847; San Juan Capistrano, California
- Occupations: Corporal, Majordomo, Suplente (Justice of the Peace), Early settler
- Known for: Early settler of San Diego, built Jolly Boy Saloon
- Children: Rosaria, Rafaela, Blas

Suplente (Substitute Justice of the Peace or Mayor) of San Diego
- Incumbent
- Assumed office 1841

Rosario E. Aguilar (ca. 1792 – 1847) was an early settler of San Diego, California.

== Life ==
Aguilar was born around 1792 in Spain.

He was corporal of the mission guard at San Diego, and had a house on site of the present town, in 1821.

In 1827, Aguilar built the Jolly Boy saloon on the town square. The bar and billiard saloon was operated by various people until the 1880s when it was demolished. A reconstructed Jolly Boy Saloon and Restaurant is located near the site of the original saloon.

He was majordomo of San Diego Mission in 1838. In 1839, Governor Juan Alvarado granted Rancho Paguai in present Poway, California, but he did not occupy or improve it, so forfeited the grant. In 1841, Aguilar was Suplente (Substitute Justice of the Peace or Mayor) of San Diego. He moved to San Juan Capistrano soon after and obtained land there. He died there in 1847.

Rosario Aguilar's daughter Rosaria was born ca. 1827. His daughter Rafaela was married to José Antonio Serrano, who was a grantee of Rancho Pauma. His son Blas was alcalde of San Juan Capistrano in 1847 and his adobe still stands there. Blas Aguilar was also a grantee of Rancho Pauma and his son, Jesus, was Bell Ringer of Mission San Juan Capistrano for several decades.

== See also ==
- 1850 Census, San Diego, California, p. 273A
