= Santibáñez de la Sierra =

- Municipality
- Flag Coat of arms

- Location in Salamanca
- Coordinates: 40°30′1″N 5°55′0″W
- Country: Spain
- Autonomous community: Castile and León
- Province: Salamanca
- Comarca: Sierra de Francia

Government
  - Mayor: Francisco Aguadero Fernández

Area
  - Total: 14 km^{2} (5.4 sq mi)
- Elevation: 611 m (2,005 ft)

Population (2025-01-01)
  - Total: 142
  - Density: 10/km^{2} (26/sq mi)
- Time zone: UTC+1 (CET)
  - Summer (DST): UTC+2 (CEST)
- Postal code: 37670

Santibáñez de la Sierra is a village and municipality in the province of Salamanca, western Spain, part of the region of León, in the autonomous community of Castile and León. It is located 67 kilometres from the provincial capital city of Salamanca and has a population of 249 people.

== Geography ==
The municipality covers an area of 14 km². It lies 611 metres above sea level and the postal code is 37670.

== Politics ==
The municipality is ruled by the Independent Highlander Group, created in the village.

== See also ==
List of municipalities in Salamanca
