= Rancho Pauma =

Mexican land grant in California

Coordinates: 33.320°N 116.970°W

Rancho Pauma was a 13,310-acre (53.9 km^{2}) Mexican land grant in present-day Pauma Valley, in San Diego County, California, given in 1844 by Governor Manuel Micheltorena to José Antonio Serrano, Blas Aguilar, and José Antonio Aguilar. The grant extended along the San Luis Rey River west of the Palomar Mountains and southeast of the San Antonio de Pala Asistencia.

== History ==
The three square league grant was made to three brothers-in-law. Jose Antonio Serrano was the son of Leandro Serrano, grantee of Rancho Temescal. In 1838, José Serrano married Rafaela, daughter of Rosario E. Aguilar, majordomo of San Diego Mission. Blas Aguilar (1811-1885), son of Rosario E. Aguilar, was majordomo at Temecula in 1834, and alcalde of San Juan Capistrano in 1848.

With the cession of California to the United States following the Mexican-American War, the 1848 Treaty of Guadalupe Hidalgo provided that the land grants would be honored. As required by the Land Act of 1851, a claim for Rancho Pauma was filed with the Public Land Commission in 1852, and the grant was patented to José Antonio Serrano, Blas Aguilar and José Antonio Aguilar in 1871.

Adelaida Serrano, daughter of José Antonio Serrano, married Judge Benjamin I. Hayes (1815-1877) in 1866. Over the next two decades, parts of the ranch were sold, with one-third of the acreage going to Hayes' son, J. Chauncey Hayes, and another to Thaddeus Amat, bishop of Los Angeles. In 1892, the ranch site was designated as part of the Pauma and Yuima Reservation.

== Historic sites of the Rancho ==
- Serrano adobe. The ruins of the Serrano adobe are included in a federally designated historic site. The event known as the Pauma Massacre, in which Luiseño Indians captured 11 Mexican soldiers, occurred in January 1847 at the Serrano adobe.

== See also ==
- Ranchos of California
- List of Ranchos of California
