= Bob Richardson (defensive back) =

American gridiron football player (1944–2020)

No. 23
- Position: Defensive back

Personal information
- Born: February 24, 1944; Minneapolis, Minnesota, U.S.
- Died: September 6, 2020 (aged 76); California, U.S.
- Listed height: 6 ft 1 in (1.85 m)
- Listed weight: 180 lb (82 kg)

Career information
- High school: Kearney (San Diego, California)
- College: UCLA

Career history
- 1966: Denver Broncos (AFL)
- 1967–1968: Hamilton Tiger-Cats (CFL)

Awards and highlights
- Grey Cup champion (1967)
- Stats at Pro Football Reference

Robert George "Bobby" Richardson (February 24, 1944 – September 6, 2020) was an American and Canadian football player who played for the Denver Broncos and Hamilton Tiger-Cats. He won the Grey Cup with Hamilton in 1967. He previously played college football at the University of California, Los Angeles (UCLA) where he was teammates with defensive tackle Jimmy Sykes.
