= Palomar Medical Center Escondido =

- Palomar Health
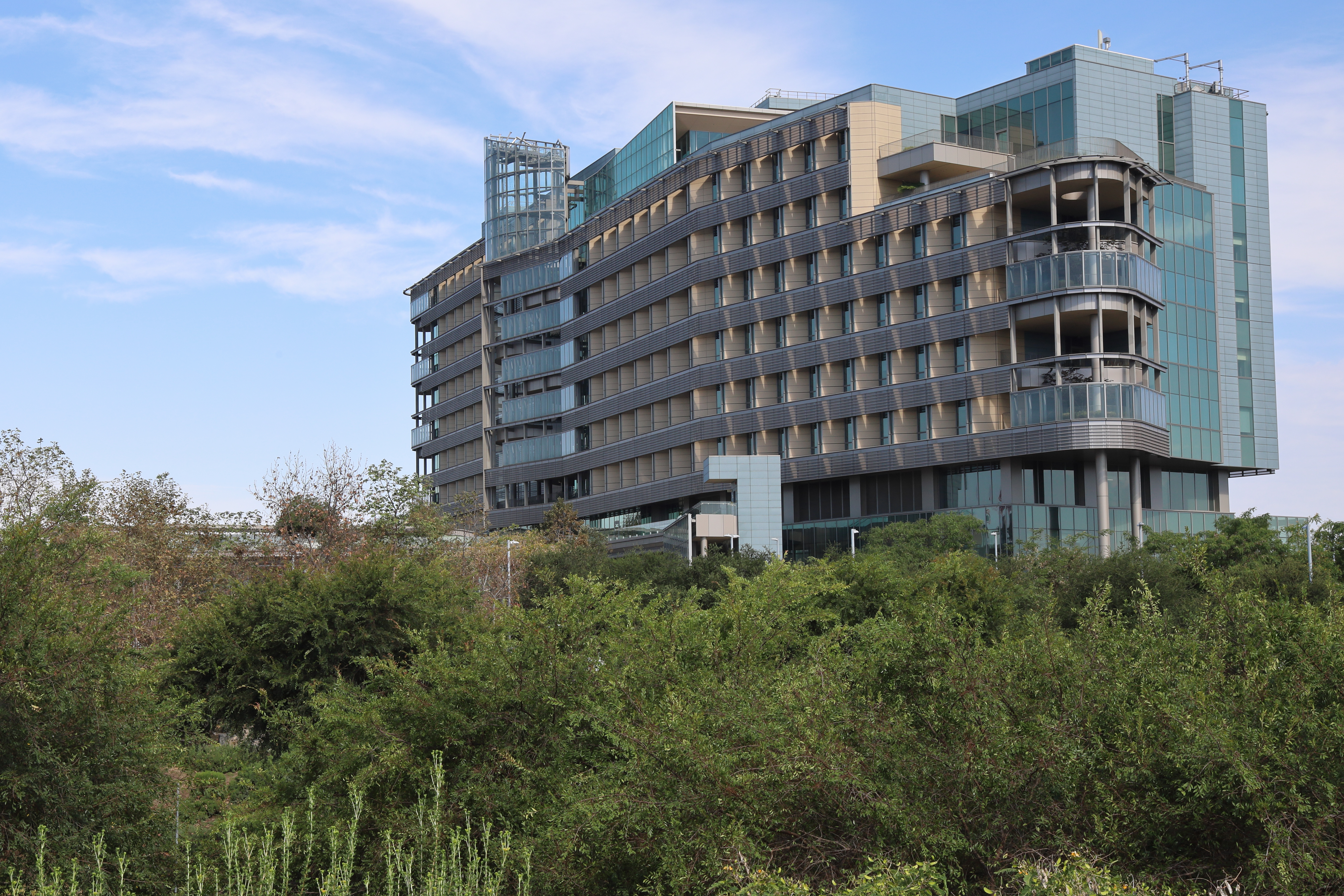
- The hospital on Citracado Parkway opened in 2012.

Geography
- Location: Escondido, California, United States
- Coordinates: 33.125°N 117.075°W

Organization
- Type: Trauma center

Services
- Emergency department: Level II trauma center
- Beds: 332

History
- Founded: 1950
- Demolished: 2022

Links
- Website: www.palomarhealth.org
- Lists: Hospitals in California

Palomar Medical Center Escondido is a hospital in Escondido, California, United States. It opened in 2012 and includes 288 private single-patient rooms, 44 emergency and trauma rooms and 11 operating rooms. The hospital is the only designated trauma center in northern San Diego County. It is operated by Palomar Health, which also operates Palomar Medical Center Poway.

== History ==
A former hospital opened in 1950 as Palomar Memorial Hospital. A tower addition, McLeod Tower, was completed in 1974. The hospital was renamed to Palomar Medical Center in 1987. It was known as Palomar Medical Center Downtown Escondido and housed psychiatric and rehabilitation wards. It started closing in 2015, and permanently closed in late 2020.

From late 2021 to early 2022, the old hospital campus was slowly demolished and replaced by Palomar Heights in 2025, a mixed use/senior living/apartment complex. To safely take down the building, heavy asbestos abatement was performed by workers as the building was built in the 1950s and contained asbestos insulation.
