= Palomar Hills, Lexington =

Palomar Hills
- Neighborhood of Lexington, Kentucky
- Interactive map of Palomar Hills
- Coordinates: 38.003°N 84.581°W
- Country: United States
- State: Kentucky
- County: Fayette
- City: Lexington
- Established: 1986

Area
  - Total: 0.325 sq mi (0.84 km^{2})
  - Water: 0 sq mi (0.0 km^{2})

Population (2000)
  - Total: 710
  - Density: 2,184/sq mi (843/km^{2})
- Time zone: UTC-5 (Eastern (EST))
  - Summer (DST): UTC-4 (EDT)
- ZIP code: 40513
- Area code: 859
- Website: palomarhills.com

Palomar Hills is a neighborhood in southwestern Lexington, Kentucky, United States. Its boundaries are Harrodsburg Road to the east, Man o' War Boulevard to the north, Bowman Mill Road to the south, and the Lexington urban growth boundary to the west.

== Neighborhood statistics ==
- Population: 710
- Land Area: 0.325 square miles (0.84 km^{2})
- Population density: 2,184 people per square mile
- Median household income (2010): $91,953
