= Kearny High School (California) =

Coordinates: 32.7998°N 117.1619°W

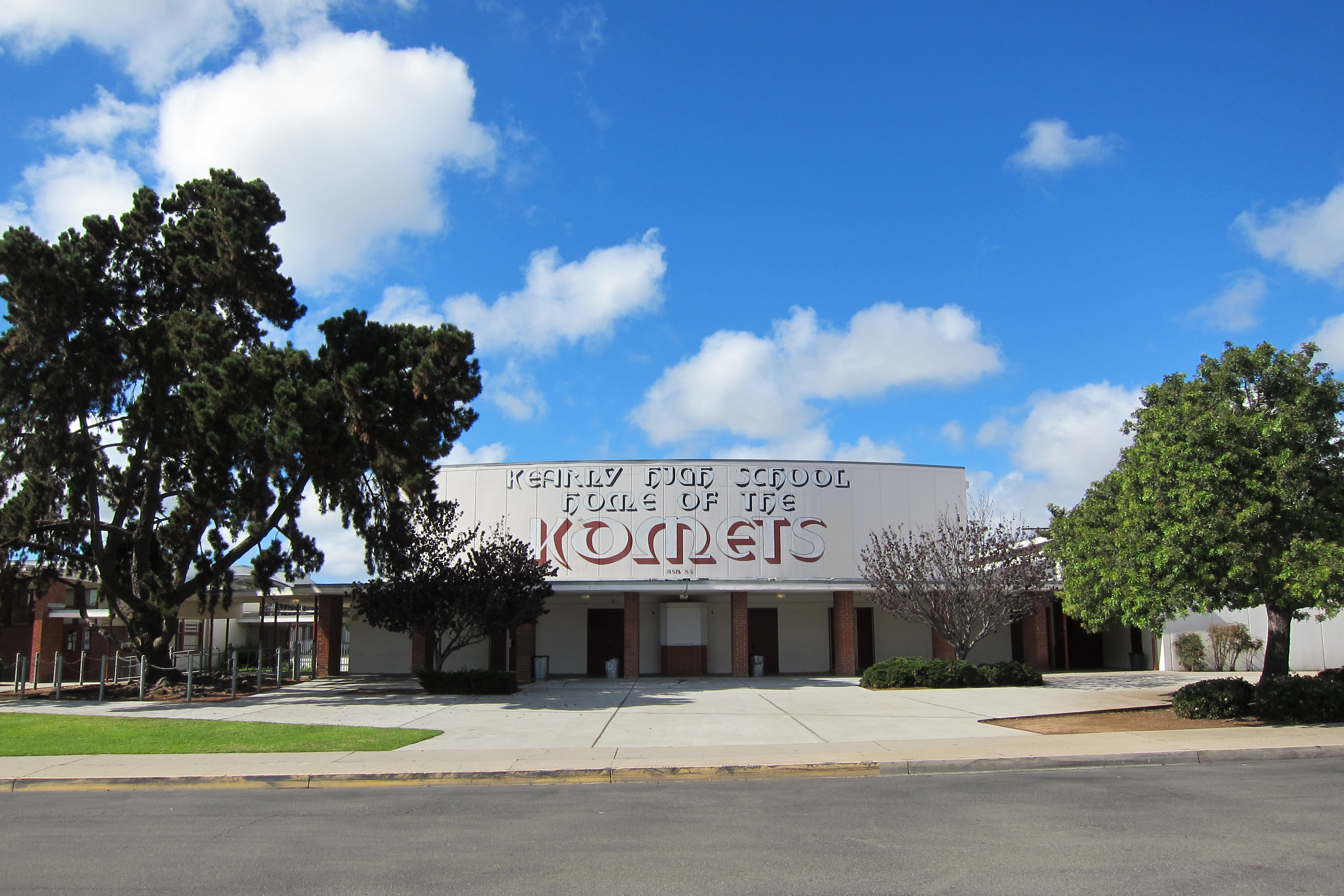

Location
- 1954 Komet Way; San Diego, California; United States

Information
- Type: Public
- Established: 1941
- School district: San Diego Unified School District
- Principal: Ana Diaz-Booz
- Grades: 9-12
- Enrollment: 1,714
- Colors: Maroon and white
- Mascot: Komets
- Website: kearny.sandiegounified.org

Kearny High School is a public high school in San Diego, California, United States. It serves students in grades 9-12 from the Linda Vista, Serra Mesa and Kearny Mesa communities. The school is part of San Diego Unified School District. Kearny's mascot is the Komet.

The Kearny High Educational Complex is home to four small autonomous high schools: the School of Biomedical Science and Technology (BST), School of College Connections (SCC), School of Digital Media & Design (DMD), and the Stanley E. Foster School of Engineering, Design, and Innovation (EID). Each school is focused on a college and career pathway and has developed its own educational philosophy.

== History ==
Kearny High opened its doors in 1941 in Linda Vista. The original school was a building in the neighborhood before moving into what is now Montgomery Middle School located at 2470 Ulric Street San Diego, CA 92111. The Class of 1943, was the first graduating class. In September 1946, Army ROTC was introduced on-campus and SGT Eakes was the instructor. In 1953 the high school moved to its present location. The first class graduated from the present location in 1954, the school address was changed to "1954 Komet Way."

=== Naming ===
Kearny High School is named after General Stephen Watts Kearny, who joined the U.S. Army at the time of the War of 1812 and served through the War with Mexico. A former military base on the land, Camp Kearny, was near where the current campus is located.

== Academics ==
=== Small schools ===
During the 2004–2005 school year, as part of the national "School-within-a-School" movement and with funding from the Bill and Melinda Gates Foundation, Kearny transformed from a traditional high school into a campus with four specialized small schools, each with an emphasis on a different field of study. The schools are:

- The School of Science, Connections and Technology (SCT) changed names to become the School of Biomedical Science and Technology (BST) in late 2018.
- The School of Digital Media Design (DMD)
- The Stanley E. Foster School of Engineering, Innovation and Design (EID)
- The School of International Business (SIB) changed names to become The School of College Connections (SCC) in May 2016.

The small school system is funded by the Bill and Melinda Gates Foundation. Kearny is one of three such small schools in the San Diego area, the other two being San Diego High School and Crawford Educational Complex. The small schools are distinct from one another with different vice principals, teaching staff and course requirements. Each school offers specialized classes only available through their specific program.

=== Curriculum ===
Kearny High uses a 4x4 block schedule, which means that students are able to complete four full classes a semester (fall term and spring term) totaling eight full classes a year, rather than the traditional six year-long courses. This enables students to complete a year's full curriculum in a more condensed term and allows them to enroll in additional electives or ROP courses. Kearny students can graduate with up to 51 college units, the equivalent of 1 full year of college.

Since Kearny has specialized academies, each school is able to offer a variety of elective courses not commonly taught in public schools. Each academy offers individual AP, ROP, and electives pertaining to their specific theme.

Exclusive to Kearny High, students who display academic excellence are able to take Mesa Fast Track their junior and senior years. This program allows students to enroll in college courses at Mesa College for both high school and college credit during the school day, and further enables the students to succeed post high school.

== Demographics ==
Between the four small schools, the total minority enrollment is 91%, and 76% of students are economically disadvantaged. Kearny's student body is roughly 50% Latino, 20% Asian, 10% black, 10% white, and 8% Mixed Race.

== Athletics ==
Kearny offers a wide array of sports:

- Fall: Football, Cross Country, Women's Volleyball, Women's Tennis.
- Winter: Soccer, Basketball, and Wrestling
- Spring: Track and Field, Men's Volleyball, Badminton, Softball, Baseball, Men's Golf, Men's Tennis

Kearny participates in California Interscholastic Federation (CIF) sports.

== Notable achievements ==
- 1973-74: men's basketball team was undefeated, 32-0, coached by Wayne Colborne and Tim Short. Players included Mark Hoaglin, Donald Page, Alan Rhodes, and Rick Taylor.
- 1975: men's golf team was undefeated, 13–0–1, coached by Wayne Colborne and Tom Barnett. Players included Tom Zamora, Steve Olson, Chris Maggay, Terry Kersey, Cameron Fellows, Jim Spawton.

Boys Soccer - San Diego CIF Records

- December 5, 2006: Tri-City Christian vs. Kearny, Most Saves By Goalkeeper, 30 shots on goal by Kearny (Tied for 4th)
- January 6, 2007: CCPAA vs. Kearny, Most Goals Scored in a Game, 18 by Kearny (Tied for 3rd)
- January 6, 2007: CCPAA vs. Kearny, Most Assists in a Game, 17 by Kearny (1st)
- January 6, 2007: CCPAA vs. Kearny, Most Goals Scored in a Game, 6 by Osvaldo Antunez (Tied for 5th)

== Notable alumni ==
- Richard Alf, co-founder and former chairman of San Diego Comic-Con.
- Gary Beare, baseball player (born 1952)
- Ed Buchanan, football running back
- Shawn Collins, former NFL player
- Jack Daugherty, former MLB player - 1978 graduate
- Grady Fuson, baseball scout
- Cliff Hicks, Class of '82, played in three Super Bowls during his 9½-year NFL career.
- Tess Gerritsen, Author
- Brian Giles, baseball player (born 1960)
- Harold Greene, Class of 1961. Journalist and Newscaster
- Cliff Hicks, football player (born 1964)
- Cleavon Little, Class of 1958. (1939–1992), actor, Blazing Saddles.
- Dwight McDonald, former NFL player
- Don McManus, Class of 1977, actor
- David Moa, football player (born 1996)
- Bob Mosley, Bassist and vocalist for rock band Moby Grape and as a soloist.
- John Richardson, former NFL player
- Bob Richardson, former NFL player
- Darnay Scott, Class of '90. ex-professional football player for the Cincinnati Bengals
- Jim Smith, former NFL player
- Lucious Smith, former NFL player
- Phil Tippett, Visual Effects Artist, Model Maker (Star Wars: A New Hope, Star Wars: The Empire Strikes Back)
- Alan Trammell, Class of 1976. Hall of Fame Major League Baseball player and manager for the Detroit Tigers
