= Sharp Memorial Hospital =

- Sharp HealthCare
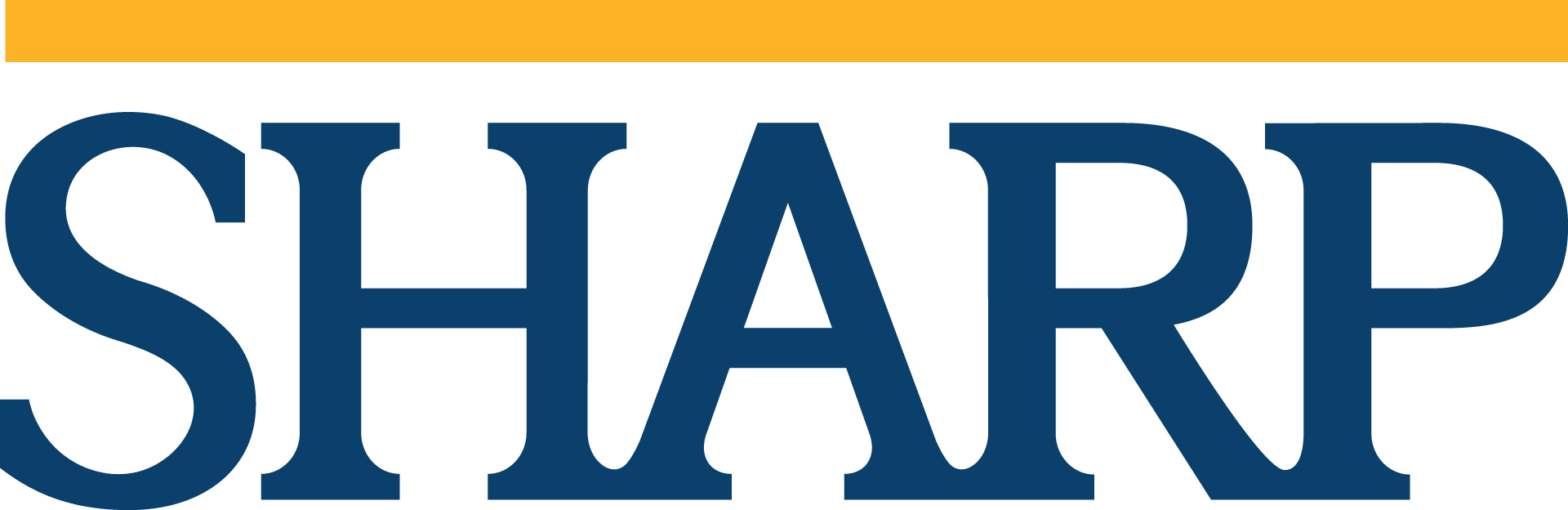

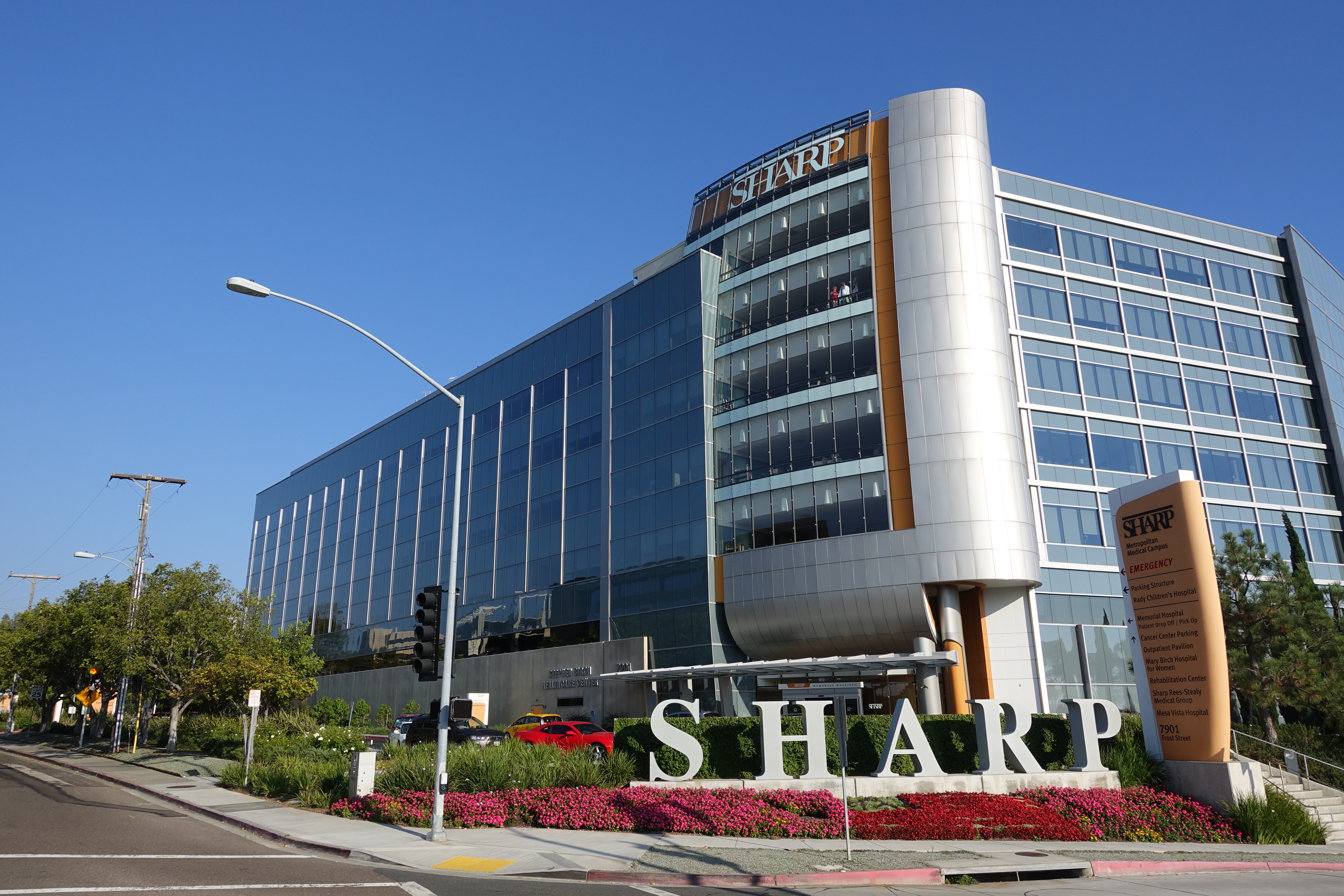

Geography
- Location: San Diego, California, United States

Organization
- Type: General

Services
- Emergency department: Level II trauma center
- Beds: 656

Helipads
- Helipad: FAA LID: CL36

History
- Founded: 1955

Links
- Website: www.sharp.com/memorial/index.cfm
- Lists: Hospitals in California

Sharp Memorial Hospital is a hospital in San Diego, California. Opened in 1955, Sharp Memorial is Sharp HealthCare's largest hospital and the system's only designated Level II trauma center. Located in Serra Mesa, the hospital has 656 beds, including 48 for intensive-care services.

In January 2009, the new expansion of Sharp Memorial Hospital opened. The new Stephen Birch Healthcare Center at Sharp Memorial Hospital is 315,621 square feet (29,322.2 m^{2}) and holds 670 beds.

== Awards ==
In June 2010, Sharp Memorial was named "The Most Beautiful Hospital in America" by Soliant Health.

In January 2008, Sharp Memorial became the second Sharp hospital to receive the American Nurses Credentialing Center Magnet recognition for nursing excellence, making Sharp HealthCare the first health system in California with two Magnet-designated hospitals.

Sharp Memorial Hospital was named the 72nd best hospital in the United States according to Newsweek's World's Best Hospitals 2024.
