= 78th Scripps National Spelling Bee =

Annual spelling bee

- Date: June 1–2, 2005
- Location: Grand Hyatt Washington, Washington D.C.
- Winner: Anurag Kashyap (13 at time of win)
- Sponsor: San Diego Union-Tribune
- Sponsor location: San Diego, California
- Winning word: appoggiatura
- No. of contestants: 273
- Pronouncer: Jacques Bailly

The 78th Scripps National Spelling Bee was held June 1–2, 2005 in Washington D.C.

Anurag Kashyap, 13, won the competition. He spelled the word appoggiatura, a musical term, correctly. He had finished 47th in the prior year's competition.

Eleven-year-old Samir Patel of Colleyville, Texas and Aliya Deri, 13, of Pleasanton, California tied for second place. Patel misspelled the word Roscian. Deri misspelled the word trouvaille.

There were 273 spellers this year, 146 boys and 127 girls, ages 9 to 14. 51 survived until the final day of competition. Only 71 spellers made it successfully through the third round, and 20 more dropped out in the fourth round.

The first place prize was $30,000 and other non-cash prizes.
