= Palomares de Béjar =

Coordinates: 40°23′23″N 5°44′12″W

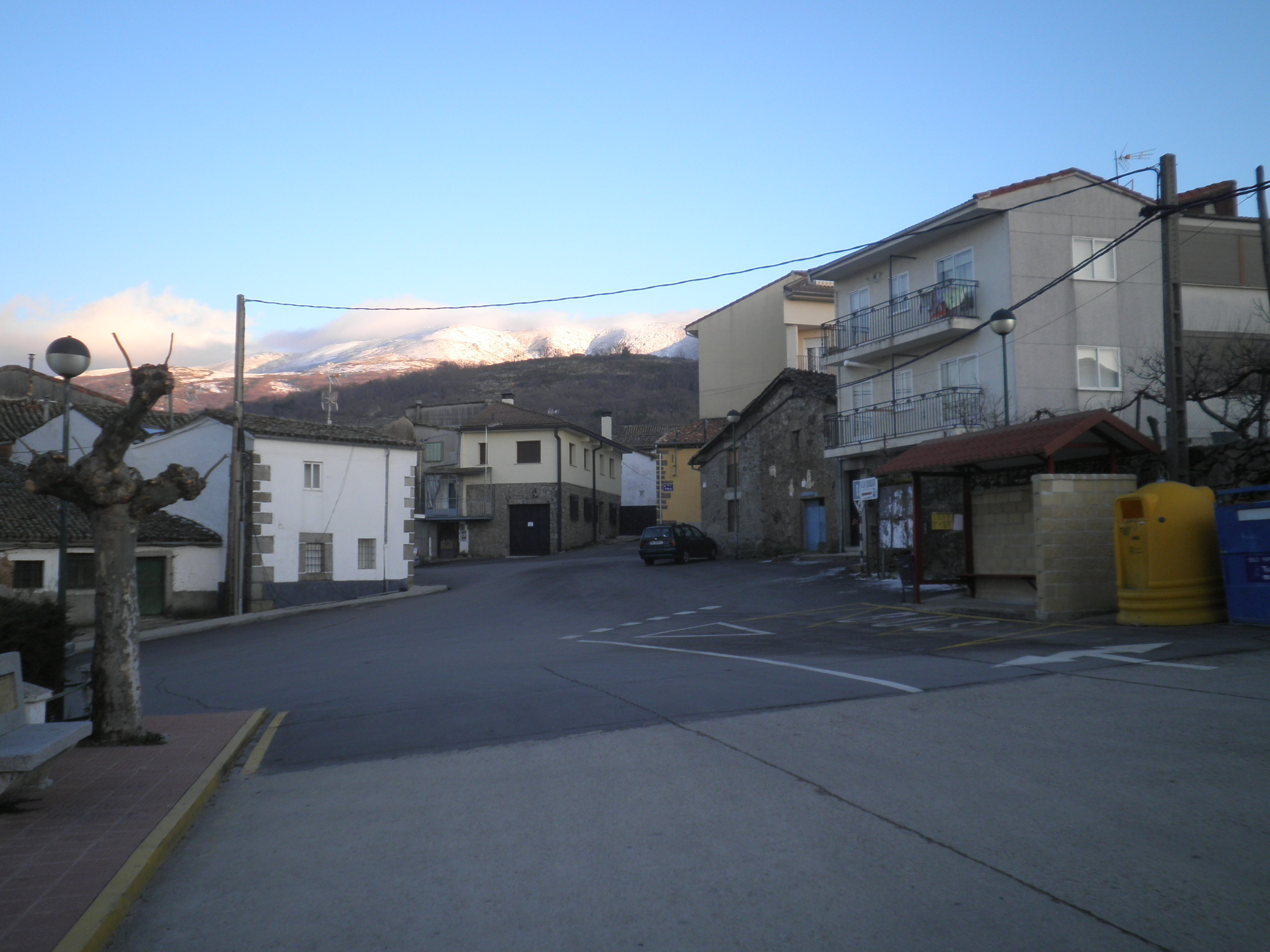

Palomares de Béjar is a neighborhood of Béjar, part of the autonomous community of Castile and León, in the province of Salamanca, western Spain. Palomares was an independent village until 1970 when it became part of Béjar.
