= Palomares del Campo =

- Municipality
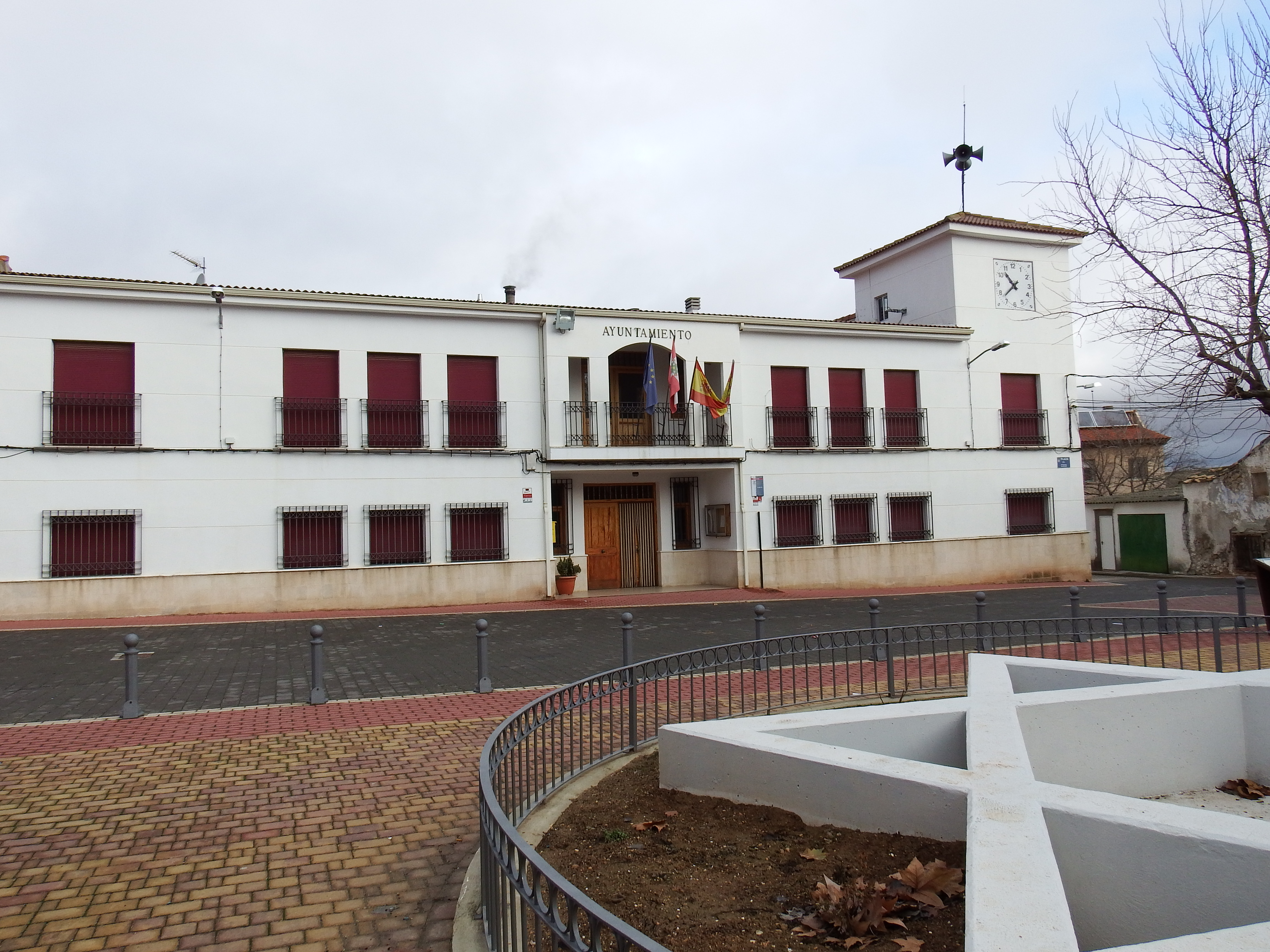
- Town hall in Palomares del Campo

- Flag Coat of arms

- Location within Spain Location within Castilla-La Mancha
- Coordinates: 39°57′N 2°36′W
- Country: Spain
- Autonomous community: Castile-La Mancha
- Province: Cuenca

Population (2025-01-01)
  - Total: 556
- Time zone: UTC+1 (CET)
  - Summer (DST): UTC+2 (CEST)

Palomares del Campo is a municipality in Cuenca, Castile-La Mancha, Spain. In 2017, it had a population of 642.
