= Béjar =

- Municipality
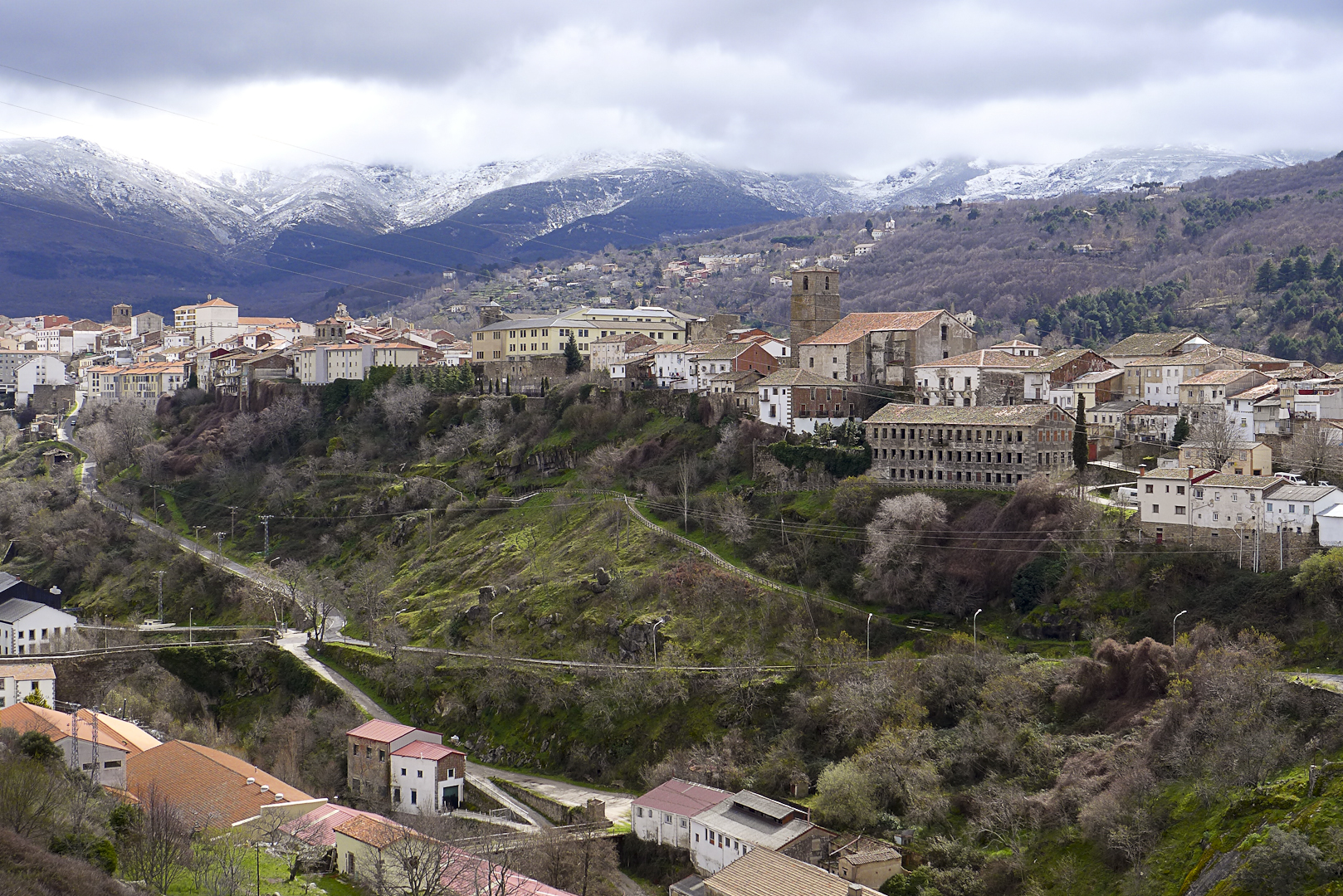

- Coat of arms

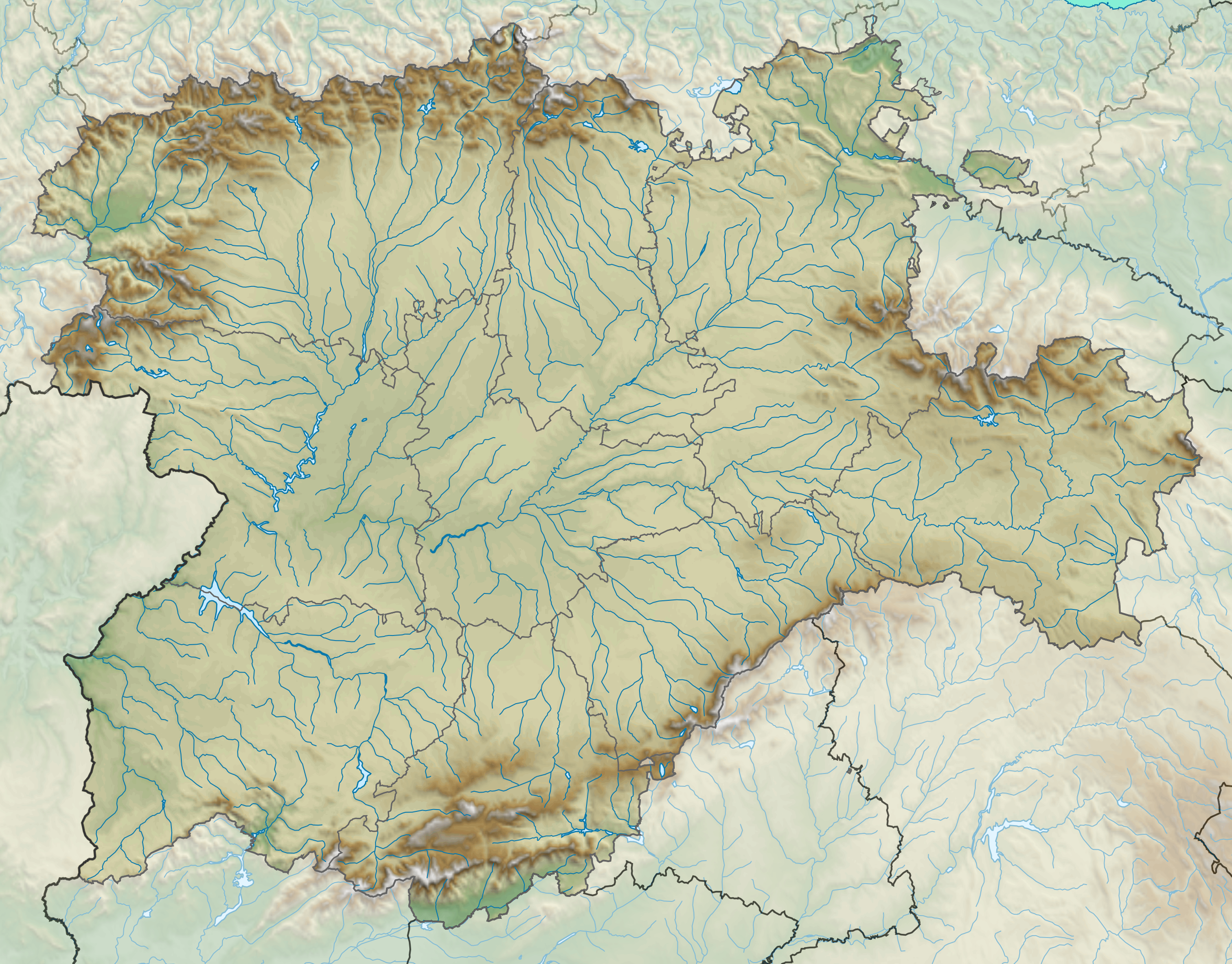
- Location within Castile and León Location within Spain
- Coordinates: 40°23′N 5°46′W
- Country: Spain
- Autonomous community: Castile and León
- Province: Salamanca

Area
  - Total: 46 km^{2} (18 sq mi)
- Elevation: 959 m (3,146 ft)

Population (2025-01-01)
  - Total: 11,993
  - Density: 260/km^{2} (680/sq mi)
- Demonym: bejarano
- Time zone: UTC+1 (CET)
- Postal code: 37700
- Dialing code: 923
- Website: www.aytobejar.com

Béjar (Spanish pronunciation: [ˈbexaɾ]) is a town and municipality of Spain located in the province of Salamanca, autonomous community of Castile and León. As of 2024, it had a population of 11,949. The historical development of the town has been linked to its once thriving textile manufacturing industry.

== History ==
Béjar was founded towards October–November 1208 and it was presumably granted a fuero afterwards. It was originally placed to the south of the current settlement, but the population relocated to its current location in the first half of the 14th century. Featuring a cattle-based economy, the town sustained a quick early growth. Over the rest of the middle ages, the town passed several times from a royal demesne to seigneurial lordship and vice versa. The town saw its fuero ratified in 1333. Béjar celebrated an eight-day long medieval fair every year. The town enjoyed from availability to plenty of wood resources, hydropower and sheep flocks.

The arrival to power of the Zúñiga family after 1396 favoured the installment of numerous courtiers and servants, who increased the demand for clothing products. Cloth-making boomed in the late-17th century. The Ducal House of Béjar brought Flemish artisans to update the wool manufacturing techniques.

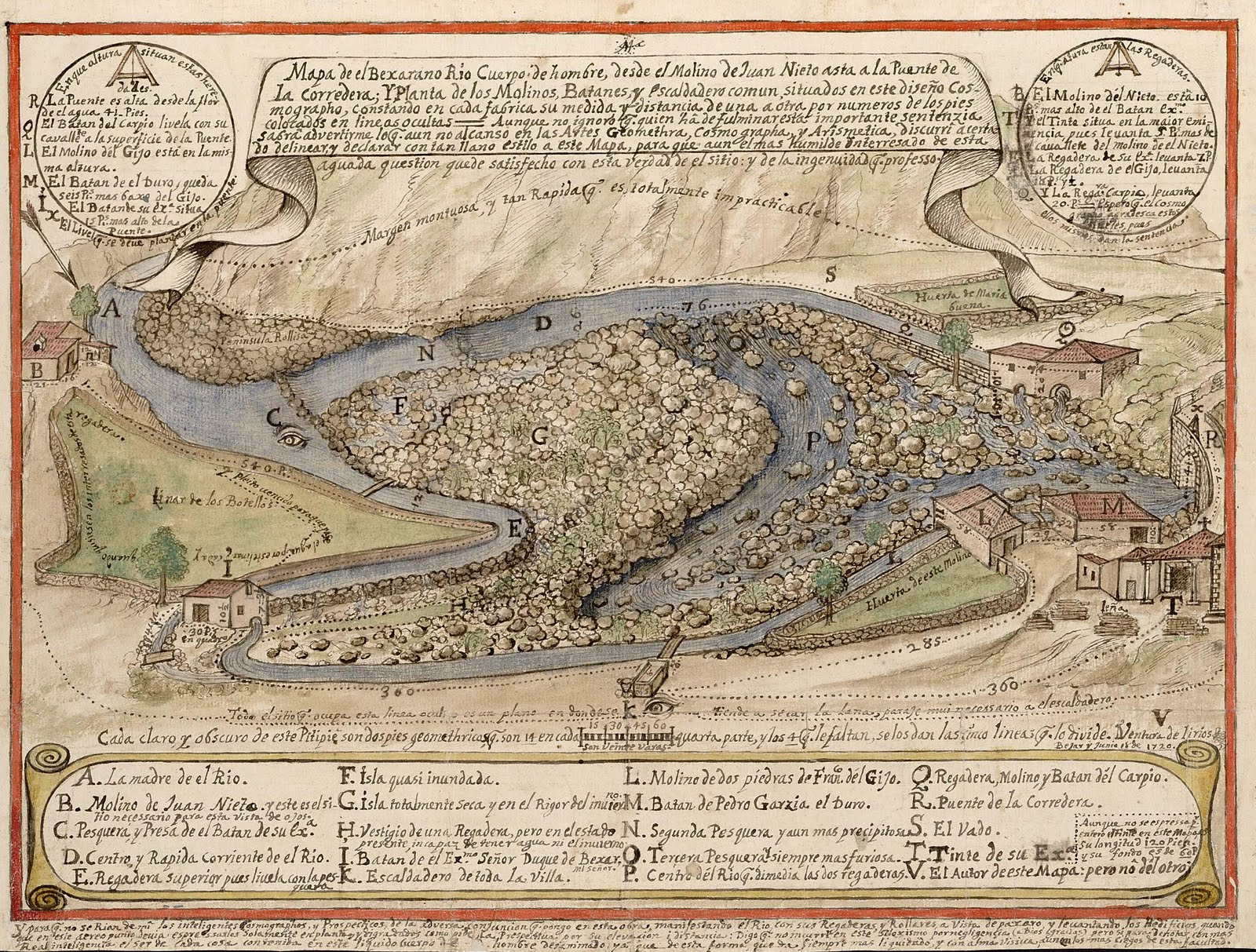
Work by Buonaventura Ligli displaying the watermills at the Río Cuerpo de Hombre (1720)

Unlike other textile manufacturing hubs in the Castilian Meseta, the local textile industry got to survive past the Early Modern Period. The late modern history of Béjar is indeed marked by its thriving textile industry, and during the 19th century it came to be referred to as the "Castilian Manchester".

Due to the peripheral location of the town and the rugged relief, railway arrived late to Béjar, in 1894. Following the end of the Civil War, Béjar became a major provider of wool clothes, primarily used for military and civil servants' uniforms.

Béjar maintained a positive demographic growth until 1970, peaking at 17,576 inhabitants. The textile industry entered a crisis in the 1970s, prompting to staffing cutbacks. Passenger train services in the Astorga–Plasencia line closed on 1 January 1985, and rail freight transport a decade later, worsening rural flight patterns in the area and hindering business development. In the wake of the decline of the secondary sector, the municipality has tried to foster other alternatives for the local economy such as tourism.

== Name ==
The name Béjar is presumably of pre-Roman origin and it has been documented as Biclara and Biclaro.

== Monuments ==
Béjar has many remarkable monuments and historical buildings:

- City walls: well-preserved medieval fort
- Church of Saint James (Santiago): built in the 12th century, now serves as a Museum of Religious Art
- Church of Saint Mary the Great (Santa María la Mayor): built between the 12th and 17th centuries, in several different architectural styles (from Mudejar to Baroque)
- Jewish Museum David Melul: shows Béjar's Hebrew past
- Ducal Palace and Camera Obscura: an ancient fortress transformed into a palace for the Duke and Duchess of Béjar in the 16th century.

== See also ==
- Palomares de Béjar
- Sierra de Béjar
