= Sharp Mary Birch Hospital for Women & Newborns =

Hospital in California USA, founded 1992

- Sharp HealthCare

Geography
- Location: San Diego, California, United States
- Coordinates: 32.7994°N 117.1550°W

Organization
- Type: Specialist

Services
- Beds: 206
- Speciality: Maternity

History
- Founded: 1992

Links
- Website: www.sharp.com/mary-birch/
- Lists: Hospitals in California

Sharp Mary Birch Hospital for Women & Newborns is a two-hundred-and-six bed, not-for-profit hospital in San Diego, California. It is run by Sharp HealthCare.

== History ==
In 1992, Sharp Mary Birch opened as the largest and most extensive free-standing center for women's health in Southern California.

In December 2018, the world's smallest surviving baby was born at Sharp Mary Birch Hospital for Women & Newborns. Born at only 8.6 ounces (245 grams), "Saybie" weighed only as much as a large apple. After a nearly five-month-long stay in the Neonatal Intensive Care Unit, she was discharged home as a healthy 5-pound infant.

== Hospital features ==
Sharp Mary Birch caters to the needs of women, expectant mothers and babies. The hospitaI delivers approximately 9,000 babies annually. It has two hundred and six beds, including eighty-four NICU beds.
