= Sharp Grossmont Hospital =

- Sharp HealthCare

Geography
- Location: La Mesa, California, United States

Services
- Beds: 524

History
- Founded: 1955

Links
- Website: www.sharp.com/grossmont/
- Lists: Hospitals in the United States

Sharp Grossmont Hospital is a 524-bed hospital in La Mesa, California, United States. It opened in 1955.
