= Serra Mesa, San Diego =

- Community of San Diego
- Serra Mesa
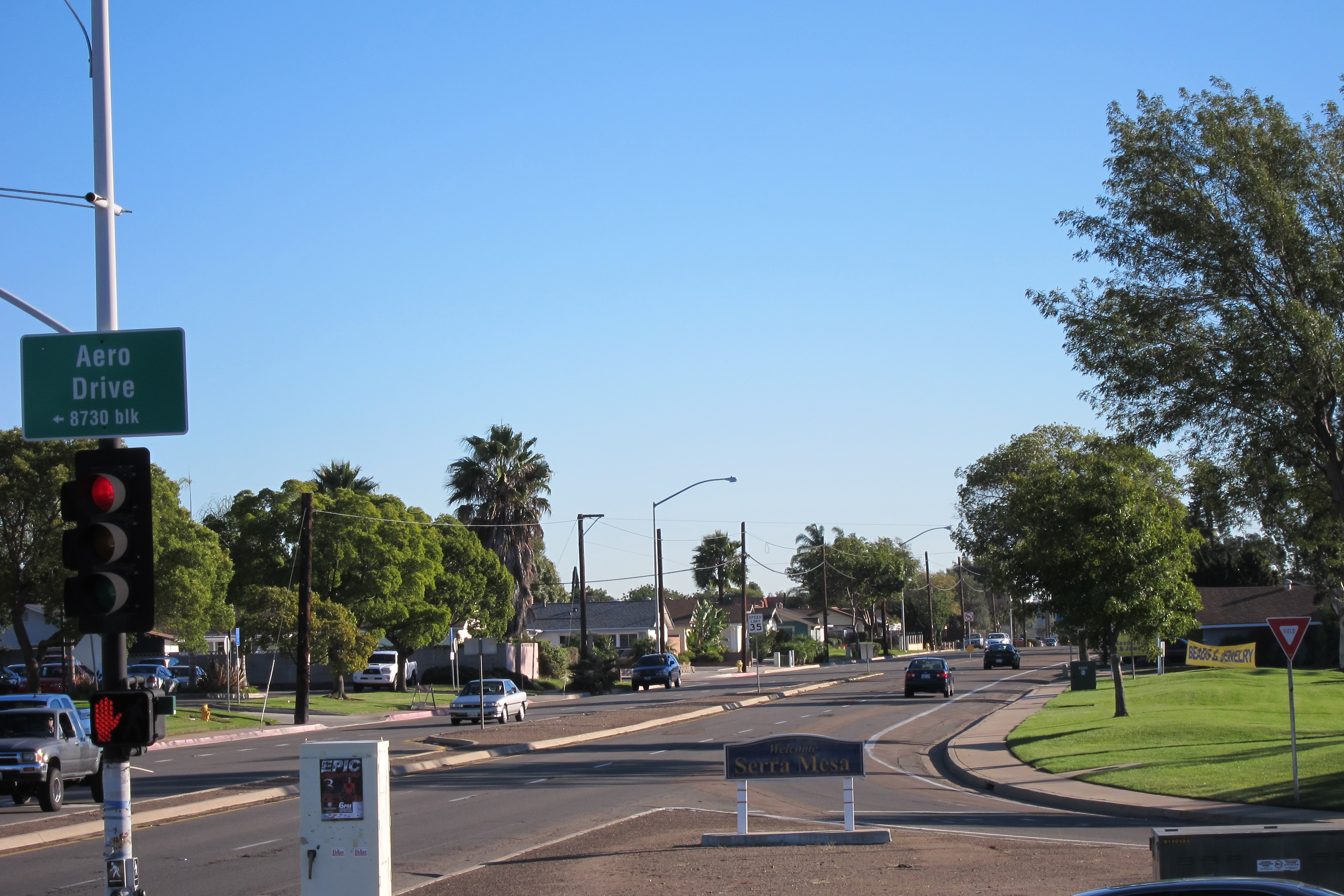
- Serra Mesa entrance at Aero Drive and Sandrock Drive

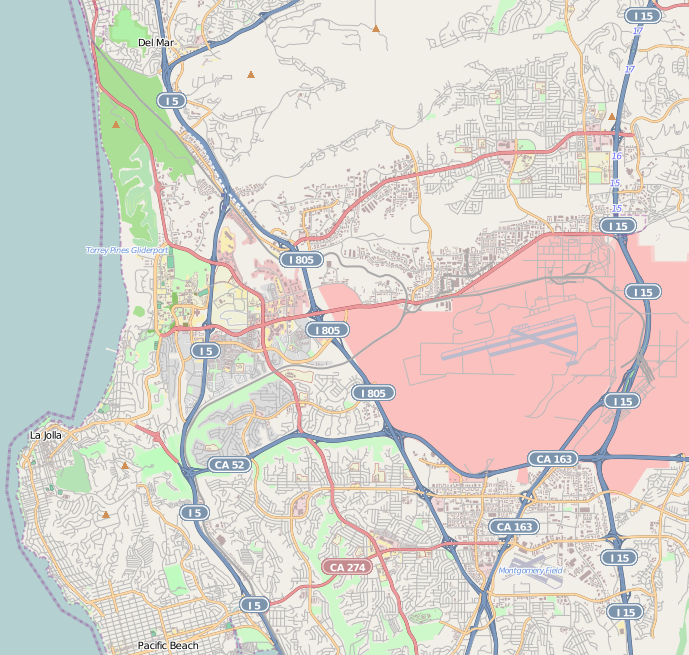
- Location within Northwestern San Diego
- Coordinates: 32.80280°N 117.13834°W
- Country: United States
- State: California
- County: San Diego
- City: San Diego

Population
  - Total: 24,000

Serra Mesa is a community in San Diego, California, roughly between Interstate 805 and Interstate 15, north of Friars Road and south of Aero Drive. It is named for Junípero Serra, a Majorcan (Spain) Franciscan friar who founded Mission San Diego de Alcalá. Adjacent communities include Kearny Mesa, Tierrasanta, Mission Valley, and Linda Vista.

The community has a population of about 24,000 people, with 8,374 housing units, most of them single-family.

== History ==
The area was originally part of the Mission Rancho Lands of San Diego granted to the Catholic Church by the King of Spain. When the Missions were secularized by Mexico in 1834, the land was deeded over to various men, including Don Santiago Argüello, who eventually divided and sold some 15,999 acres (65 km^{2}) of land.

More modern development of the community began after the Korean War, when the Navy built its Cabrillo Heights housing project in the early 1950s.

The Serra Mesa Community Planning Area also includes the Lincoln (formerly Cabrillo) Navy Housing, Cabrillo Village, Cabrillo Heights, Mission Village, and Birdland neighborhoods. Birdland is home to three hospitals (Sharp Memorial, Sharp Mary Birch Hospital for Women and Newborns, and Rady Children's), including two of the six designated trauma centers in San Diego County as well as the only women's hospital and the only hospital dedicated solely to pediatric care. Six acres of the Civita development (formerly Quarry Falls), and the western slope of Murphy Canyon fall within Zip Code 92123. The Escala development, along with Fenton Parkway (Costco) are part of Mission Valley (92108), but feed into the Taft Middle School service area.

In 2008, the Serra Mesa Community Council sued the city of San Diego for approving construction of Palladium at Aero, a large development that they said was out of scale with the neighborhood, without requiring an environmental impact report. The lawsuit was settled with some concessions on the part of the developer, and construction went ahead in 2013.

== Education ==
Schools in Serra Mesa include Will Angier Elementary School, Harry M. Wegeforth Elementary School, John Paul Jones Elementary School, Ellwood P. Cubberley Elementary School, Benito Juarez Elementary School, and William Howard Taft Middle School. Students in Serra Mesa usually then go on to attend Kearny High School. Fletcher Elementary School serves the Birdland community. Fletcher Elementary students move on to Montgomery Middle School in Linda Vista (San Diego 92111) and Kearny High School. All of these schools belong to San Diego Unified School District. Residents of Juvenile Hall attend classes administered by the San Diego County Board of Education. The San Diego Unified School District maintains an Instructional Materials office in Birdland. St. Columba Catholic Church operates a parochial school (K-8). The San Diego Hebrew Day School (K-8) is located on Afton Road. The San Diego Community College District operates its North City Campus at 8401 Aero Drive.

== Parks ==
Ruffin Canyon Open Space Preserve is 84 acres (340,000 m^{2}) of native habitat, running north and south nearly the length of Serra Mesa. This canyon preserve is being restored by a local group called the Friends of Ruffin Canyon.

The Serra Mesa Community Center has a small community park which includes a ball field, two playgrounds for young children, an outdoor basketball court, and an indoor basketball court. The recreation center offers after-school and seasonal activities for children. This park is located near Wegeforth Elementary School and St. Columba Church. Murray Ridge Park is near the intersection of Murray Ridge Road and Mission Center Road, at the west end of Celestine Avenue. Cabrillo Park is between Angier Elementary School and Highway 805. It includes ball fields, large lawns, and a playground.

== Government ==
In the federal government of the United States, Serra Mesa is represented by two senators from California and one U.S. representative from California's 52nd congressional district. As of 2021, the U.S. representative for Serra Mesa is Scott Peters, a Democrat, while the U.S. senators from California are Dianne Feinstein and Alex Padilla, both Democrats.

In the government of California, Serra Mesa is represented by California's 39th State Senate district, currently held by Toni Atkins, a Democrat. Also in the state government of California, Serra Mesa is represented by California's 79th State Assembly district, currently held by Akilah Weber, a Democrat.

In the San Diego County Board of Supervisors, Serra Mesa is represented by Nathan Fletcher. In the San Diego City Council, Serra Mesa is represented by Councilman Raul Campillo in District 7. Keven Beiser is the representative in District B of the San Diego Unified School District. Greg Robinson represents Serra Mesa in the 1st District of the San Diego County Board of Education.

The San Diego Police Department Eastern Substation is also located in Serra Mesa. Juvenile Hall, Juvenile Court, and the San Diego County Probation Department are located in the Birdland neighborhood.

== Notable people from Serra Mesa ==
- Alan Trammell, Major League Baseball player
- Rick Harrison, TV star
