= Palomar Health =

Healthcare district in California, USA

Coordinates: 33.1187°N 117.1207°W

Palomar UC San Diego Health

Health care district overview
- Formed: 1948; 78 years ago
- Jurisdiction: San Diego County, California
- Health care district executives: Diane Hansen, President & CEO; Hugh King, Chief Financial Officer
- Key document: Local Health Care District Law
- Website: palomarucsdhealth.org

Palomar UC San Diego Health is a California health care district in San Diego County. It operates Palomar Medical Center Escondido, Palomar Medical Center Poway, and various other facilities and programs.

Covering 800 square miles (2,100 km^{2}), Palomar Health is California's largest health care district by area. The district was formed in 1984, replacing the Escondido Valley Hospital Association which itself was formed in 1945.

== Governance ==
Each California health care district is governed by a locally elected board of directors. Candidates are elected to the board of directors for four-year terms. For example, an election for 3 out of the 7 directors took place during the November 2012 California elections.

== History ==
The origins of Palomar Health can be traced back to two benevolent German women, Charlotta Baker Hintz, a nurse, and Elizabeth Martin, a dietician, who left their jobs at the Anaheim Sanitarium in 1933, to establish a hospital to serve the small farming community of Escondido. Using their own money, the women bought an egg and poultry plant at 125 South Broadway and converted it into a 13-bed hospital.

In 1945, the Escondido Valley Hospital Association was formed to investigate the possibility of building a larger facility to keep pace with growth. The Escondido Valley Hospital Association established the Northern San Diego County Hospital District in 1948 and the vision of the new, larger facility in downtown Escondido was achieved in 1950. Palomar Memorial Hospital, named in tribute to the men and women who served in World War II, was dedicated on February 16, 1950.

In 1970, the McLeod Tower was added to Palomar Memorial Hospital to help meet the needs of the growing community. After receiving full designation as a trauma center in 1987, the hospital was renamed Palomar Medical Center.

The Northern San Diego County Hospital District supervised the construction of a sister facility in Poway, Pomerado Hospital in 1977. As that community grew, several expansions were made to Pomerado Hospital. Palomar Health added a third hospital to the system in 2012 with the opening of the new Palomar Medical Center in west Escondido. The original hospital in downtown Escondido was renamed Palomar Health Downtown Campus.

To more accurately reflect the region it served, the Northern San Diego County Hospital District was renamed Palomar Pomerado Hospital District in 1984. Five years later, the name was changed to Palomar Pomerado Health System and was then shortened to Palomar Pomerado Health in 2001. In 2012, the district’s name was simplified to Palomar Health. Today, Palomar Health is the largest health care district serving communities in an 850-square-mile area and a trauma center that covers more than 2,200 square miles of South Riverside and North San Diego Counties. In addition to three hospitals, Palomar Health offers home health care, surgery, skilled nursing, ambulatory care, behavioral health services, wound care, and community health education programs.

Palomar Health and UC San Diego Health have completed an agreement to form a Joint Powers Authority (JPA) to stabilize and enhance patient care in North San Diego County as of July 1, 2026. The new health system operates under the name "Palomar UC San Diego Health" and serves a region of nearly one million people.

== See also ==
- List of California health care districts
