= Palomar Medical Center Poway =

Palomar UC San Diego Poway
- Palomar Health, UC San Diego Health

Geography
- Location: Poway, California, United States
- Coordinates: 32.997°N 117.056°W

Services
- Emergency department: Yes
- Beds: 107

History
- Former name: Palomar Medical Center Poway
- Founded: 1977

Links
- Website: www.palomarhealth.org/facilities/palomar-poway-outpatient
- Lists: Hospitals in California

Palomar UC San Diego Health Poway, formerly Palomar Medical Center Poway, is a hospital in Poway, California. It opened in 1977. It was formerly independently operated by Palomar Health which also operates Palomar Medical Center Escondido.

On July 1 2026, UC San Diego Health and Palomar Health announced the formation of their Joint Powers Authority (JPA)
