= Sharp Mesa Vista Hospital =

- Sharp HealthCare

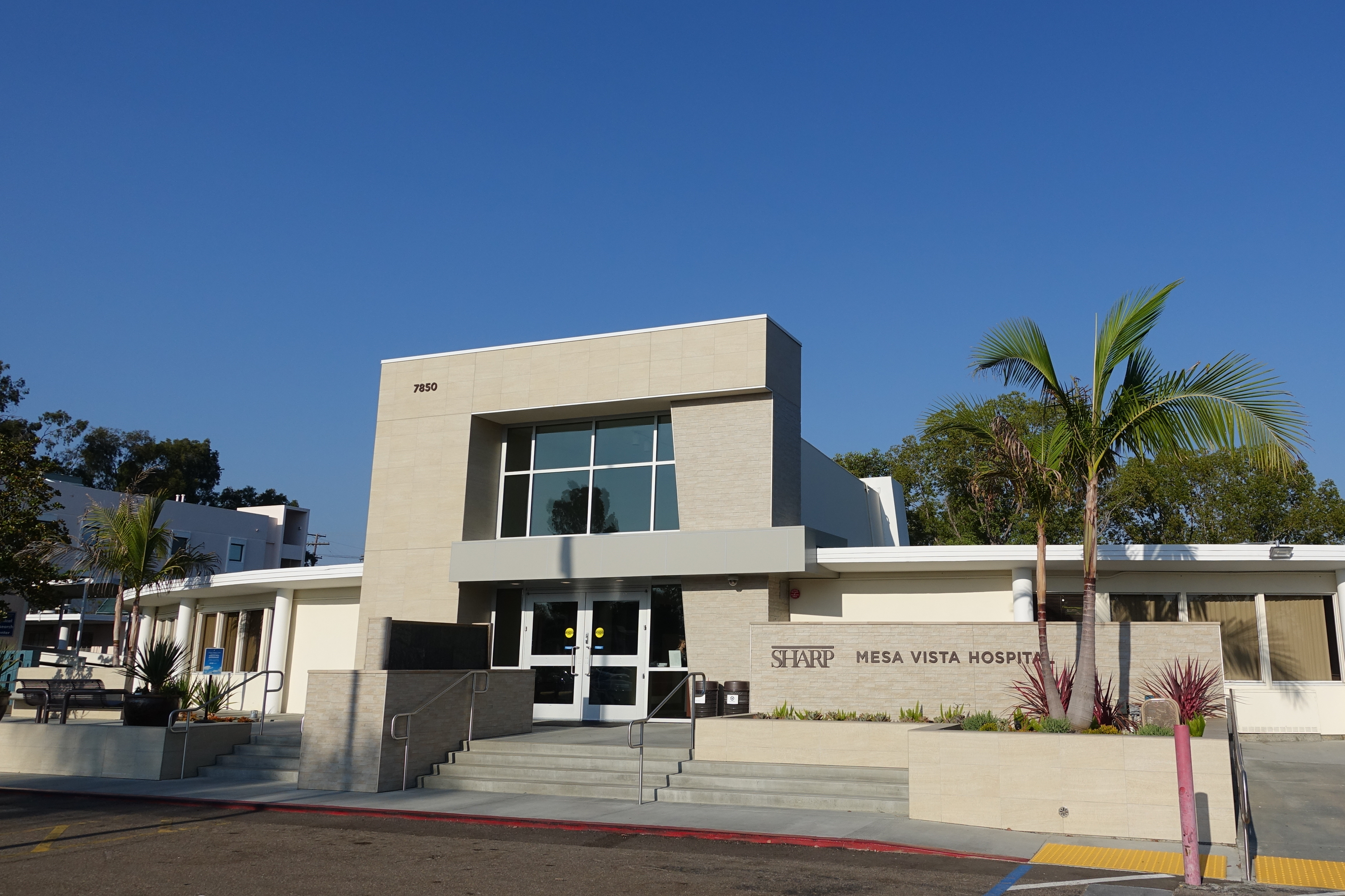

Geography
- Location: San Diego, California, United States

Organization
- Type: Specialist

Services
- Beds: 149
- Specialty: Psychiatric hospital

History
- Opened: 1963

Links
- Website: www.sharp.com/mesa-vista
- Lists: Hospitals in California

Sharp Mesa Vista Hospital is a psychiatric hospital in San Diego, California. It opened in 1963 and has been gradually expanded over the last 60 years. It is run by Sharp HealthCare. The facility has 149 licensed beds.

== Features ==
The hospital provides comprehensive behavioral health services for children, adolescents, adults and seniors experiencing anxiety, bipolar disorder, depression, eating disorders and other conditions.
