= Sharp HealthCare =

Healthcare System in San Diego County, California

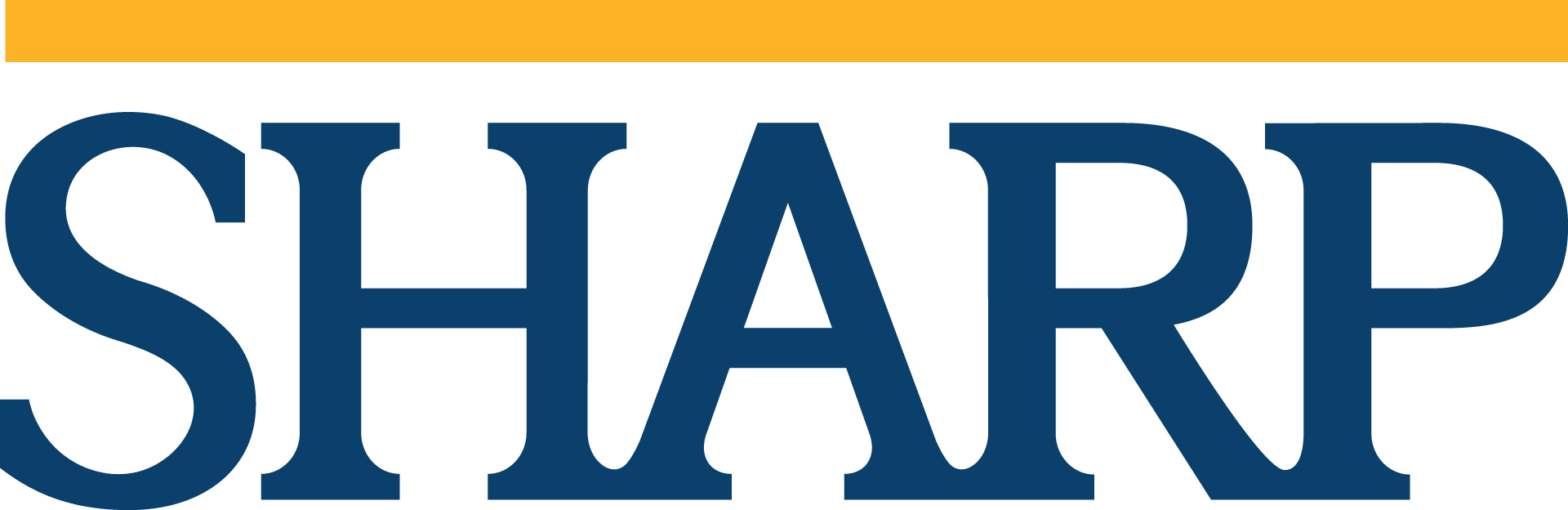
- Company type: Not-for-profit hospital system
- Industry: Health Care
- Founded: San Diego, California (1955)
- Headquarters: San Diego, California, United States
- Key people: Christopher Howard, President
- Revenue: 3.5 billion USD (Fiscal year ended September 30, 2016)
- Number of employees: 19,000
- Website: sharp.com

Sharp HealthCare is a not-for-profit regional health care group based in San Diego, California. Sharp includes four acute care hospitals, three specialty hospitals, and three affiliated medical groups. It has approximately 2,700 affiliated physicians and 19,000 employees.

== History ==
The first Sharp hospital opened in 1955, as Donald N. Sharp Memorial Community Hospital, a nonprofit facility in San Diego. Funding for the facility began in 1950, with a donation of $500,000 from a local rancher and radio communications pioneer, Thomas E. Sharp. This donation was made in memory of his son, US Army Air Corps Lt. Donald N. Sharp, who had been killed during World War II. By 1952, more than $2.5 million had been donated by 11,300 individuals, families, and businesses. The groundbreaking for Donald N. Sharp Memorial Community Hospital took place in 1953.

== Locations ==
Sharp HealthCare includes four acute care hospitals, three specialty hospitals and three medical groups.

=== Acute care hospitals ===
- Sharp Grossmont Hospital, located in La Mesa, California, affiliated with Sharp HealthCare in 1991. The hospital holds 542 licensed beds, 24 of which are neonatal intensive care beds.

=== Specialty hospitals ===
- Sharp Mary Birch Hospital for Women & Newborns, opened in 1992. The hospital holds 206 beds, 84 of which are neonatal intensive care unit (NICU) beds.
- Sharp Mesa Vista Hospital joined Sharp in 1998, and currently holds 159 licensed and 146 maintained psychiatric beds.
- Sharp McDonald Center provides treatment for adults and their families. The hospital became affiliated with Sharp HealthCare in 1998 and has 16 licensed beds.

=== Medical groups ===
- Sharp Community Medical Group (SCMG) is an association of physicians located throughout San Diego County. The group includes over 1,000 physicians.
- Sharp Rees-Stealy Medical Group has 19 locations throughout San Diego County.
