= Livorno =

Port city in Italy

Livorno Leghorn
- Comune
- Comune di Livorno
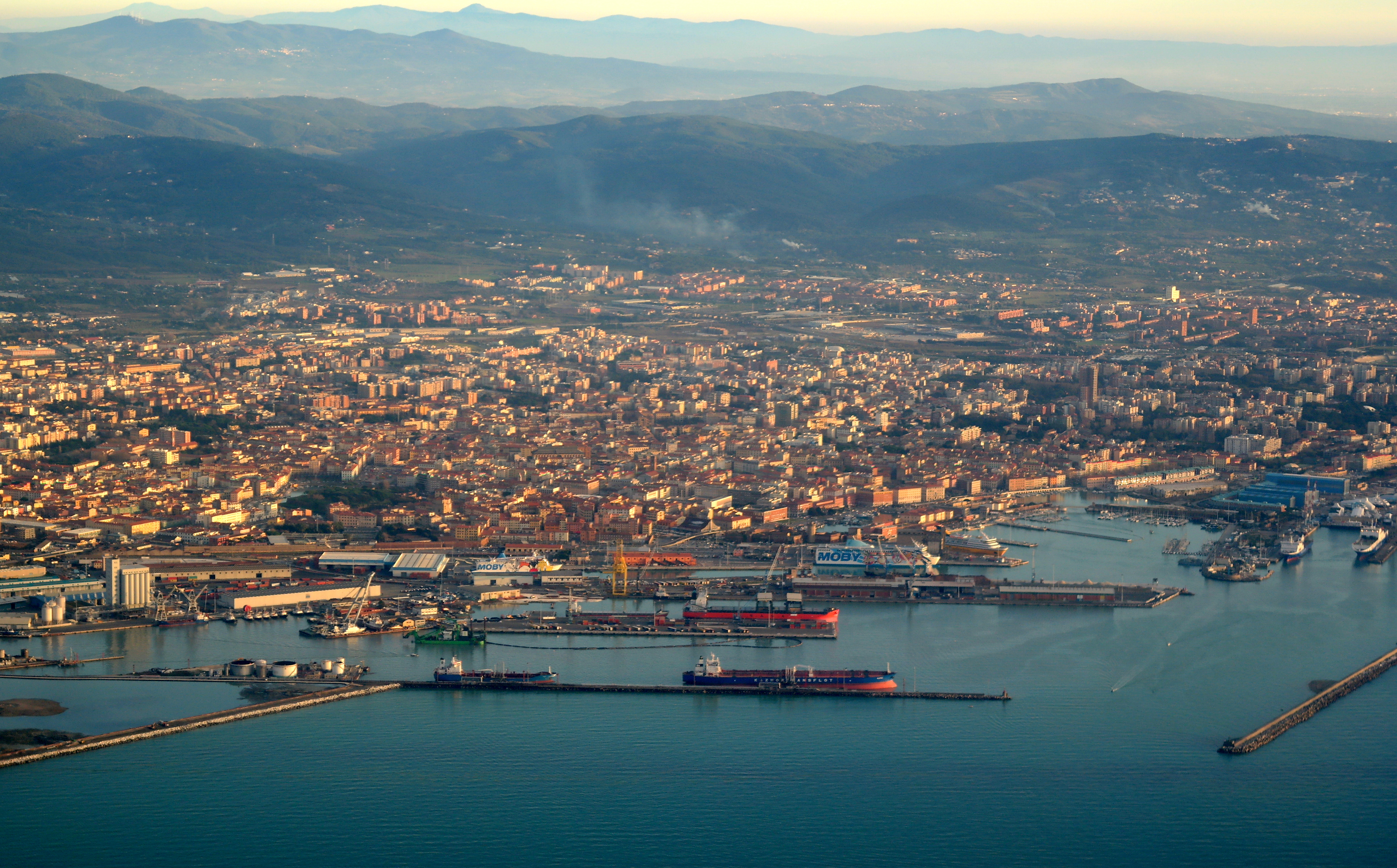
- View of Livorno

- Flag Coat of arms

- Location within Tuscany Location within Italy
- Coordinates: 43°33′07″N 10°18′30″E
- Country: Italy
- Region: Tuscany
- Province: Livorno (LI)
- Frazioni: List: Castellaccio, Gorgona, Limoncino, Quercianella, Valle Benedetta, Montenero

Government
  - Mayor: Luca Salvetti (PD)

Area
  - Total: 104.50 km^{2} (40.35 sq mi)
- Elevation: 3 m (9.8 ft)

Population (2026)
  - Total: 152,451
  - Density: 1,458.9/km^{2} (3,778.4/sq mi)
- Demonym(s): Livornesi; Labronici
- Time zone: UTC+1 (CET)
  - Summer (DST): UTC+2 (CEST)
- Postal code: 57100
- Dialing code: 0586
- Patron saint: Julia of Corsica
- Saint day: 22 May
- Website: Official website

Livorno (Italian: [liˈvorno]) is a port city on the Tyrrhenian Sea on the western coast of the region of Tuscany in central Italy. The capital of the Province of Livorno, with a population of 152,451, it is the 25th-largest city in Italy. It is traditionally known in English as Leghorn (pronounced /lɛˈɡɔːrn/ leh-GORN, /ˈlɛɡhɔːrn/ LEG-horn or /ˈlɛɡərn/ LEG-ərn).

During the Renaissance, Livorno was designed as an "ideal town". Developing considerably from the second half of the 16th century by the will of the House of Medici, Livorno was an important free port. Its intense commercial activity was largely dominated by foreign traders. Also the seat of consulates and shipping companies, it became the main port-city of the Grand Duchy of Tuscany. The high status of a multiethnic and multicultural Livorno lasted until the second half of the nineteenth century, when it was surpassed by other cities. Evidence of that prosperous time can be seen in the many churches, villas, and palaces of the city.

Livorno is considered to be the most modern among all the Tuscan cities, and is the third most-populous of the region, after Florence and Prato.

== History ==
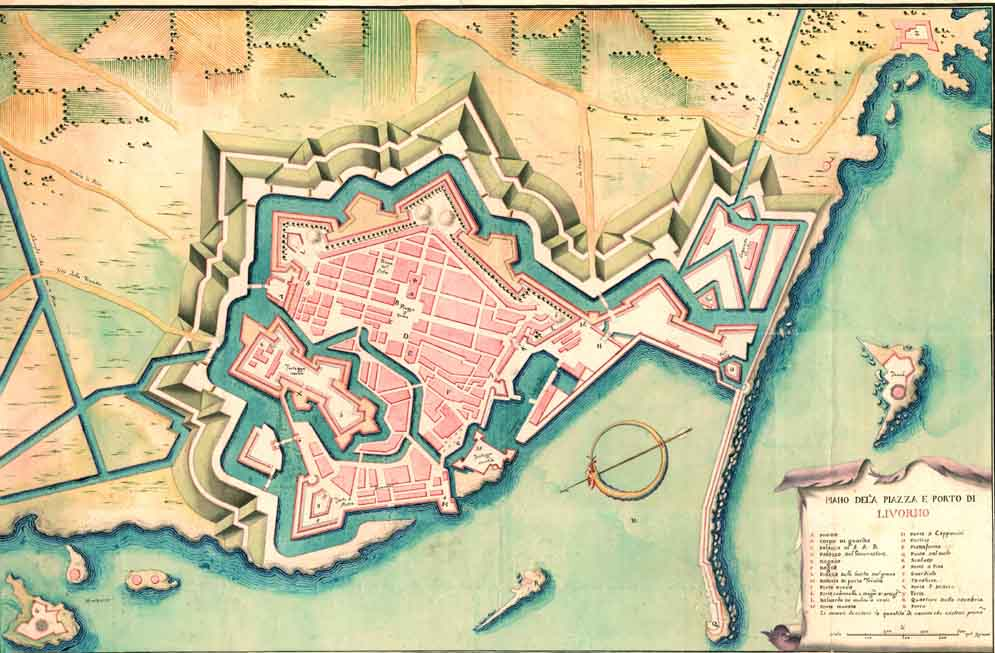
Fortifications of Livorno in the 17th century

=== Origins ===
The origins of Livorno are controversial, although the place was inhabited since the Neolithic Age. This is documented by the worked bones, and pieces of copper and ceramic found on the Livorno Hills in a cave between Ardenza and Montenero. The Etruscan settlement was called Labro.

The construction of the Via Aurelia coincided with the occupation of the region by the Romans. They are also known for their toponyms and the ruins of towers. The natural cove called Liburna is a reference to the type of ship, the liburna, adopted by Roman navy from the Liburnians. Other ancient toponyms include Salviano (Salvius) and Antignano (Ante ignem), which was the place situated before Ardenza (Ardentia), where beacons directed the ships to Porto Pisano. Cicero mentioned Liburna in a letter to his brother, in which he called it Labrone.

=== Medieval ===
Livorna is mentioned for the first time in 1017 as a small coastal village, a port and the remains of a Roman tower under the rule of Lucca. In 1077, a tower was built by Matilda of Tuscany. The Republic of Pisa owned Livorna from 1103 and built a quadrangular fort called Quadratura dei Pisani ("Quarter of the Pisans") to defend the port. Porto Pisano was destroyed after the crushing defeat of the Pisan fleet in the Battle of Meloria in 1284.

In 1399, Pisa sold Livorna to the Visconti of Milan; in 1405 it was sold to the Republic of Genoa; and on 28 August 1421 it was bought by the Republic of Florence. The name "Leghorn" was derived from the Genoese name Ligorna. The alternative name Livorno was first used in the fourteenth century and prevailed by the eighteenth.

Between 1427 and 1429, a census counted 118 families in Livorno, including 423 persons. Monks, Jews, military personnel, and the homeless were not included in the census. The only remainder of medieval Livorno is a fragment of two towers and a wall, located inside the Fortezza Vecchia.

=== Medicean period (1500–1650) ===
After the arrival of the Medici, the ruling dynasty of Florence, some modifications were made in the city. Between 1518 and 1534 the Fortezza Vecchia was constructed, and the voluntary resettlement of the population to Livorno was stimulated. Livorno still remained a rather insignificant coastal fortress. By 1551, the population had grown to 1562 residents.

Seat of the crusading and corsairing Order of Saint Stephen after 1561, distinctive for its aggressive approach towards the Muslim world, Livorno became a major Mediterranean slave trade hub in the early modern period, rivalling Malta's. Its share of slave population may have been over a 25% of the population.

During the Italian Renaissance, when the settlement was ruled by the Grand Duchy of Tuscany of the House of Medici, Livorno was designed as an "Ideal town". In 1577 the architect Bernardo Buontalenti drew up the first plan. The new fortified town had a pentagonal design, for which it is called Pentagono del Buontalenti, incorporating the original settlement. The Porto Mediceo was overlooked and defended by towers and fortresses leading to the town centre.

In the late 1580s, Ferdinando I de' Medici, Grand Duke of Tuscany, declared Livorno a free port (porto franco), which meant that the goods traded here were duty-free within the area of the town's control.

In 1593, the Duke's administration established the Leggi Livornine to regulate trade. These laws protected merchant activities from crime and racketeering, and instituted laws regarding international trade. The laws established a well-regulated market and were in force until 1603. Also expanding Christian tolerance, the laws offered the right of public freedom of religion and amnesty to people having to gain penance from clergy in order to conduct civil business. The Grand Duke attracted numerous Turks, Persians, Moors, Greeks, and Armenians, along with Jewish immigrants. Sephardic Jews began to immigrate to Livorno in the late sixteenth century, following the Alhambra Decree and expulsion of Jews from Spain and Portugal. Livorno extended rights and privileges to them, and they contributed greatly to the mercantile wealth and scholarship in the city.

Livorno became an enlightened European city and one of the most important ports of the entire Mediterranean Basin. Many European foreigners moved to Livorno. These included Christian Protestant reformers who supported such leaders as Martin Luther, John Calvin, and others. French, Dutch, and English arrived, along with Orthodox Greeks. Meanwhile, Jews continued to trade under their previous treaties with the Grand Duke. On 19 March 1606, Ferdinando I de' Medici elevated Livorno to the rank of city; the ceremony was held in the Fortezza Vecchia Chapel of Francis of Assisi.

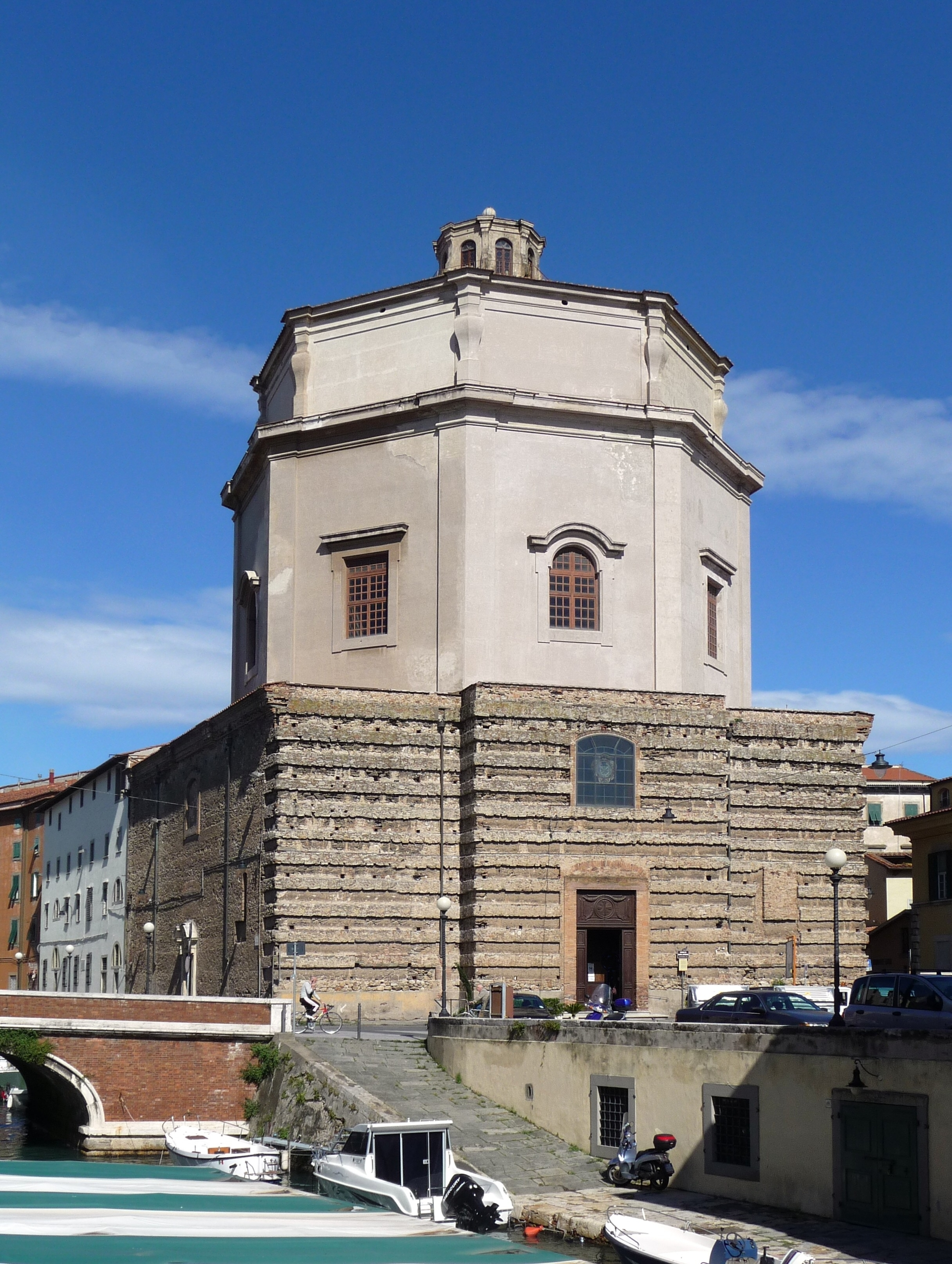
Santa Caterina, Livorno

The Counter-Reformation increased tensions among Christians; dissidents to the Papacy were targeted by various Catholic absolute rulers. Livorno's tolerance declined during the European wars of religion. But, in the preceding period, the merchants of Livorno had developed a series of trading networks with Protestant Europe, and the Dutch, British, and Germans worked to retain these. In 1653 a naval battle, the Battle of Leghorn, was fought near Livorno during the First Anglo-Dutch War.

=== 17th century and later ===
At the end of the 17th century, Livorno underwent a period of great urban planning and expansion. Near the defensive pile of the Old Fortress, a new fortress was built, together with the town walls and the system of navigable canals through neighbourhoods. After the port of Pisa had silted up in the 13th century, its distance from the sea increased and it lost its dominance in trade. Livorno took over as the main port in Tuscany. By 1745 Livorno's population had risen to 32,534.

The more successful of the European powers re-established trading houses in the region, especially the British with the Levant Company. In turn, the trading networks grew, and with those, Britain's cultural contact with Tuscany. An increasing number of British writers, artists, philosophers, and travellers visited the area and developed the unique historical ties between the two communities. The British referred to the city in English as "Leghorn", derived from the Genoese term. Through the centuries, the city's trade fortunes fell and rose according to the success or failure of the Great Powers. The British and their Protestant allies were important to its trade.

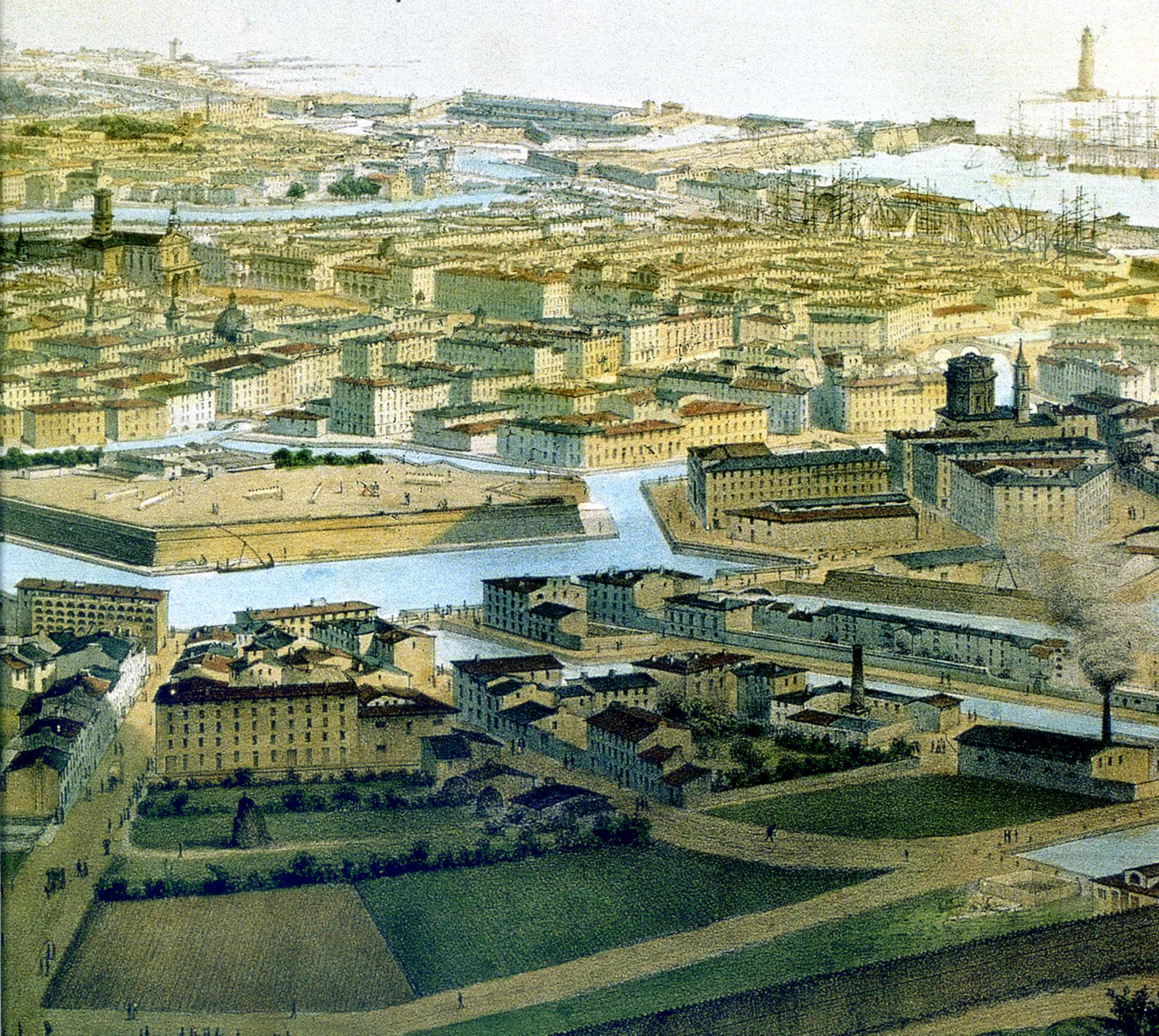
Bird's-eye view of Livorno in the mid 19th century.

During the Italian campaigns of the French Revolutionary Wars of the late eighteenth century, Napoleon's troops occupied Livorno along with the rest of Tuscany. Under the Continental System, the French prohibited trade with Britain, and the economy of Livorno suffered greatly. The French had altogether taken over Tuscany by 1808, incorporating it into the Napoleonic empire. After the Congress of Vienna, Austrian rule replaced the French.

In 1861, Italy succeeded in its wars of unification. At that time the city counted 96,471 inhabitants. Livorno and Tuscany became part of the new Kingdom of Italy and, as part of the Kingdom, the town lost its status as a free port. The city's commercial importance declined.

In the 18th and 19th centuries, Livorno had numerous public parks housing important museums such as the Museo Civico Giovanni Fattori, Museo di storia naturale del Mediterraneo, and cultural institutions as the Biblioteca Labronica F.D. Guerrazzi and others in Neoclassical style as Cisternone, Teatro Goldoni and Liberty style as Palazzo Corallo, Mercato delle Vettovaglie, Stabilimento termale Acque della Salute, the Scuole elementari Benci all the last on project by Angiolo Badaloni.

In the early 19th century, the American Elizabeth Ann Seton converted from Protestantism to Catholicism while visiting Italian friends in Livorno. She later was canonized as the first American-born saint.

During the 1930s, numerous villas were built on the avenue along the sea in Liberty style based on designs by Cioni. These added to the architectural richness of the city.

Livorno suffered extensive damage during World War II. Many historic sites and buildings were destroyed by bombs of the Allies preceding their invasion of Italy, including the cathedral and Synagogue of Livorno.

Since the late 20th century, Livorno's residents have become well known for their left-wing politics. The Italian Communist Party was founded in Livorno in 1921.

== Climate ==
Livorno has a hot-summer mediterranean climate (Köppen climate classification Csa). Summers have warm days with the heat lingering on throughout the night, hence going above the subtropical threshold in spite of its relatively high latitude. Winters are mild for the latitude due to the moderating influence from the Mediterranean Sea. Precipitation is in a wet winter/dry summer pattern as with all climates fitting the Mediterranean definition.

Climate data for Livorno (1991–2020)
Month	Jan	Feb	Mar	Apr	May	Jun	Jul	Aug	Sep	Oct	Nov	Dec	Year
Record high °C (°F)	19.6 (67.3)	21.5 (70.7)	24.1 (75.4)	25.6 (78.1)	32.2 (90.0)	35.4 (95.7)	37.8 (100.0)	36.0 (96.8)	33.6 (92.5)	28.8 (83.8)	25.0 (77.0)	21.5 (70.7)	37.8 (100.0)
Mean daily maximum °C (°F)	12.3 (54.1)	12.8 (55.0)	15.1 (59.2)	17.7 (63.9)	21.7 (71.1)	25.5 (77.9)	28.1 (82.6)	28.4 (83.1)	25.3 (77.5)	21.3 (70.3)	16.6 (61.9)	13.0 (55.4)	19.8 (67.7)
Daily mean °C (°F)	9.2 (48.6)	9.4 (48.9)	11.7 (53.1)	14.2 (57.6)	18.2 (64.8)	21.9 (71.4)	24.5 (76.1)	24.8 (76.6)	21.4 (70.5)	17.7 (63.9)	13.4 (56.1)	9.9 (49.8)	16.4 (61.5)
Mean daily minimum °C (°F)	6.0 (42.8)	5.9 (42.6)	8.3 (46.9)	10.8 (51.4)	14.6 (58.3)	18.3 (64.9)	20.9 (69.6)	21.1 (70.0)	17.5 (63.5)	14.1 (57.4)	10.1 (50.2)	6.8 (44.2)	12.9 (55.2)
Record low °C (°F)	−7.0 (19.4)	−6.6 (20.1)	−4.8 (23.4)	0.1 (32.2)	3.0 (37.4)	7.8 (46.0)	11.6 (52.9)	10.8 (51.4)	5.0 (41.0)	0.6 (33.1)	−1.7 (28.9)	−5.4 (22.3)	−7.0 (19.4)
Average precipitation mm (inches)	69 (2.7)	65 (2.6)	58 (2.3)	63 (2.5)	52 (2.0)	34 (1.3)	23 (0.9)	29 (1.1)	88 (3.5)	123 (4.8)	142 (5.6)	93 (3.7)	839 (33)
Average precipitation days	8	8	9	8	7	4	2	3	6	9	10	10	84
Source 1: Consorzio LaMMA
Source 2: Enea-Casaccia (precipitation days)

== Demographics ==
Historical population
Year	Pop.	±%
1861	94,977	—
1871	96,631	+1.7%
1881	97,147	+0.5%
1901	96,340	−0.8%
1911	103,973	+7.9%
1921	113,897	+9.5%
1931	120,711	+6.0%
1936	124,963	+3.5%
1951	142,333	+13.9%
1961	161,077	+13.2%
1971	174,791	+8.5%
1981	175,741	+0.5%
1991	167,512	−4.7%
2001	156,274	−6.7%
2011	157,052	+0.5%
2021	154,483	−1.6%
Source: ISTAT

As of 2026, the population is 152,451, of which 48.4% are male, and 51.6% are female. Minors make up 13.4% of the population, and seniors make up 28.1%.

=== Immigration ===
As of 2025, immigrants make up 10.7% of the population. The 5 largest foreign countries of birth are Albania, Romania, Peru, Ukraine, and Senegal.

Foreign population by country of birth (2025)
Country of birth	Population
Albania	2,247
Romania	1,729
Peru	1,193
Ukraine	998
Senegal	888
Morocco	748
Bangladesh	641
Moldova	470
Tunisia	464
Philippines	452
China	429
Brazil	360
Nigeria	319
Dominican Republic	316
Russia	316

==== Armenian community ====
Ferdinando I de' Medici, Grand Duke of Tuscany issued in 1591 a decree encouraging Armenians to settle in Livorno to increase its trade with the Ottoman Empire and western Asia. By the beginning of the 17th century, Armenians operated 120 shops in town. In 1701 the Armenian community, who were members of the Armenian Apostolic Church, were authorized to build their own church, which they dedicated to Gregory the Illuminator. The project was by Giovanni Battista Foggini and the church was completed a few years later but did not open for worship until 1714. The church had a Latin cross plan and a dome at the intersection of the transept and nave. Destroyed during World War II, it was partly restored in 2008 but is not open to worship.

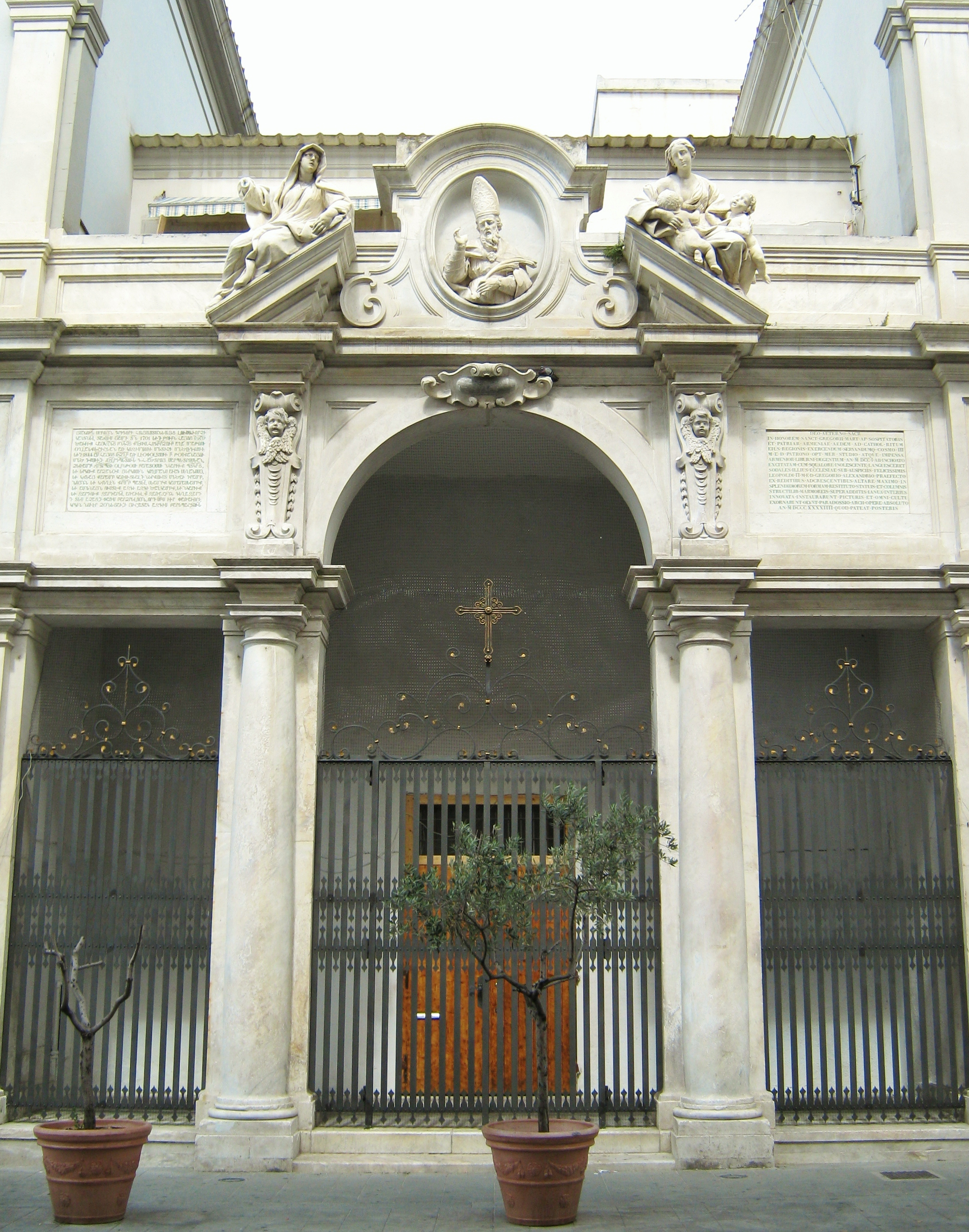
Church of Gregory the Illuminator

==== Greek community ====
The first Greeks who settled in Livorno early in the 16th century were former mercenaries in the fleet of Cosimo de' Medici and their descendants. This community grew and became significant in the 18th and 19th centuries when Livorno became one of the principal hubs of the Mediterranean trade. Most of the new Greek immigrants came from western Greece, Chios, Epirus and Cappadocia.

Based on its status since the late 16th century as a free port (port franc) and the warehouses constructed for long-term storage of goods and grains from the Levant, until the late 19th century Livorno enjoyed a strong strategic position related to Greek mercantile interests in the Black Sea, the Mediterranean Sea, and the North Atlantic. The conflicts between Great Britain and France during the Napoleonic Wars of the early 19th century, with associated port embargoes, piracy, and confiscation of cargoes, played out to the advantage of those Greek merchants willing to accept risk. By the 1820s, Greek entrepreneurs gradually replaced the Protestant British, Dutch, French and other merchants who left the city.

The Greeks concentrated on the grain market, banking and ship-brokering. Cargoes of wheat from the Black Sea were received at Livorno, before being re-shipped to England. Returning ships carried textiles and other industrial goods, which Greek merchants shipped to Alexandria and other destinations in the Ottoman Empire. Chians controlled much of the trade. In 1839 Livorno had ten major commercial houses, led primarily by ethnic Greeks and Jewish Italians.

The ethnic Greek community (nazione) had a distinctive cultural and social identity based on their common Greek Orthodox religion, language and history. In 1775 they established the Confraternity of Holy Trinity (Confraternita della SS. Trinità) and the Church of the Santissima Trinità, Livorno, the second non-Catholic church in Tuscany. The Armenians had earlier built their own Orthodox church. The community founded a Greek school, awarding scholarships for higher studies to young Greeks from the Peloponnese, Epirus, Chios or Smyrna. The community raised funds to support the Greek War of Independence of 1821, as well as various Greek communities in the Ottoman Empire and in Italy.

It also assisted non-Greeks. The Rodocanachi family financed the "School of Mutual Education" established in Livorno by the pedagogist Enrico Mayer. The community contributed to founding a school for poor Catholic children. The local governing authorities recognized the contributions of distinguished members of the Greek community (e.g. members of the Papoudoff, Maurogordatos, Rodocanachi, Tossizza and other families) and granted them titles of nobility. After unification and the founding of the Kingdom of Italy in 1861, the Greek community in Livorno declined, as the privileges of the free port were rescinded.

==== Jewish community ====
See the history of the Jews in Livorno.

=== Dialects ===
Vernacolo

Livorno inhabitants speak a variant of the Italian Tuscan dialect, known as a vernacolo. Il Vernacoliere, a satirical comic-style magazine printed chiefly in the Livornese dialect, was founded in 1982 and is now nationally distributed.

Bagitto

The bagitto was a Judæo-Italian regional dialect once used by the Jewish community in Livorno. It was a language based on Italian, developed with words coming from Tuscan, Spanish, Portuguese, Hebrew and Yiddish; the presence of Portuguese and Spanish words is due to the origin of the first Jews who came to Livorno, having been expelled from the Iberian peninsula in the late 15th century.

== Sights ==
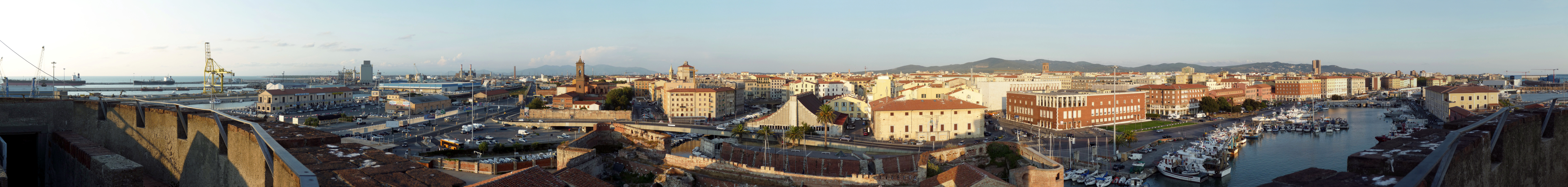
View of Livorno from the old fortress

=== Acquario comunale "Diacinto Cestoni" ===
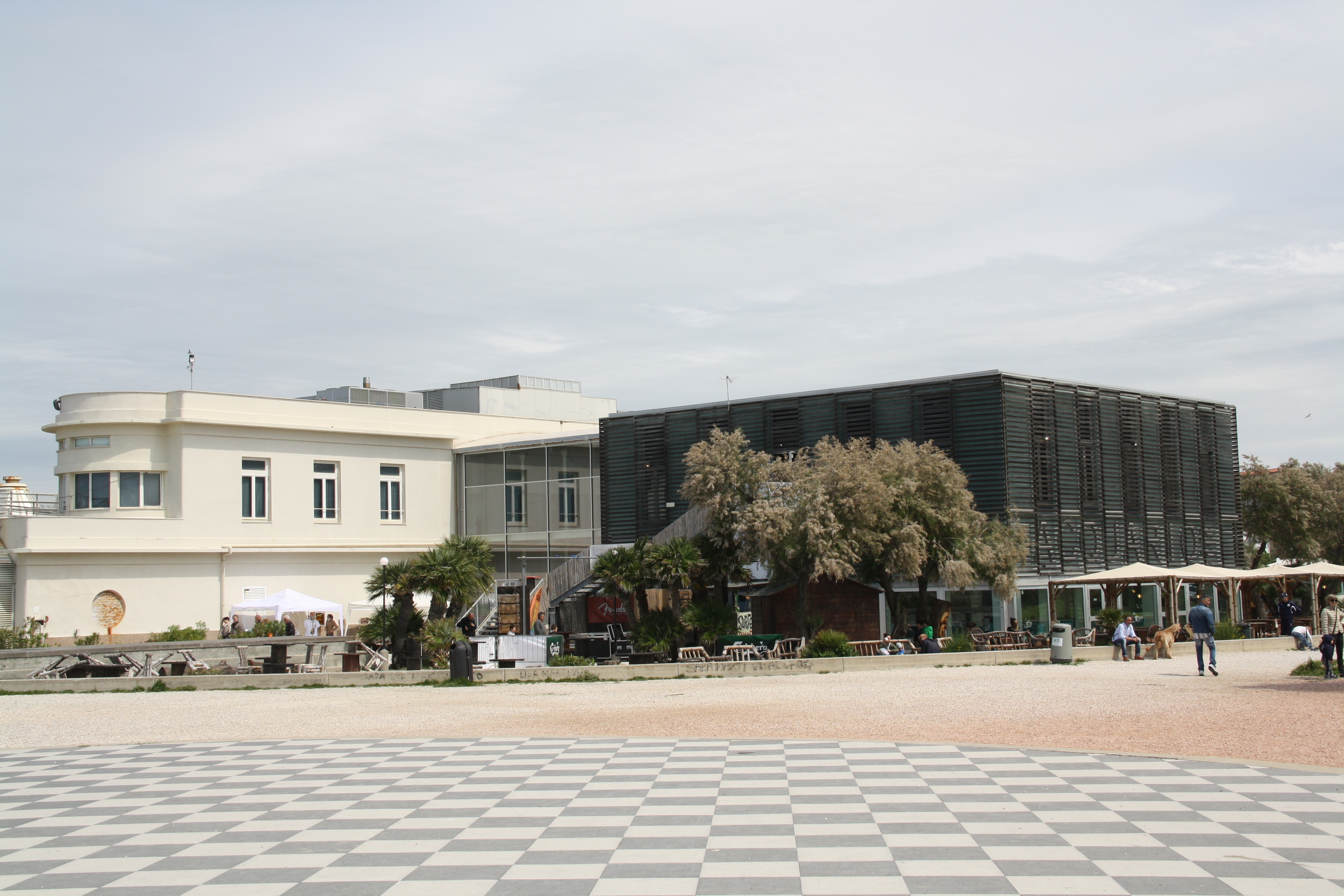
Acquario comunale Diacinto Cestoni

Livorno Aquarium, dedicated to Diacinto Cestoni, is the main in Tuscany. It is situated by Terrazza Mascagni on the seafront promenade. It was built on a project by Enrico Salvais and Luigi Pastore as a heliotherapy centre and was opened to the public on 20 June 1937. Destroyed during World War II was rebuilt in 1950; in 1999 underwent extensive reconstruction, on a plan by Studio Gregotti and works carried out by Opera Laboratori Fiorentini, was opened definitely on 31 July 2010. On the ground floor, the exhibition includes: Diacinto Cestoni Room which consists of 12 exhibition tanks, Mediterranean Area, Indus-Pacific tank, Caribbean Sea, Ligurian coast, Tropical waters, Greek-Roman archaeological coastal area. Livorno Aquarium has 33 exhibition tanks containing 2000 animals of 300 different species.

=== Museo Civico Giovanni Fattori ===
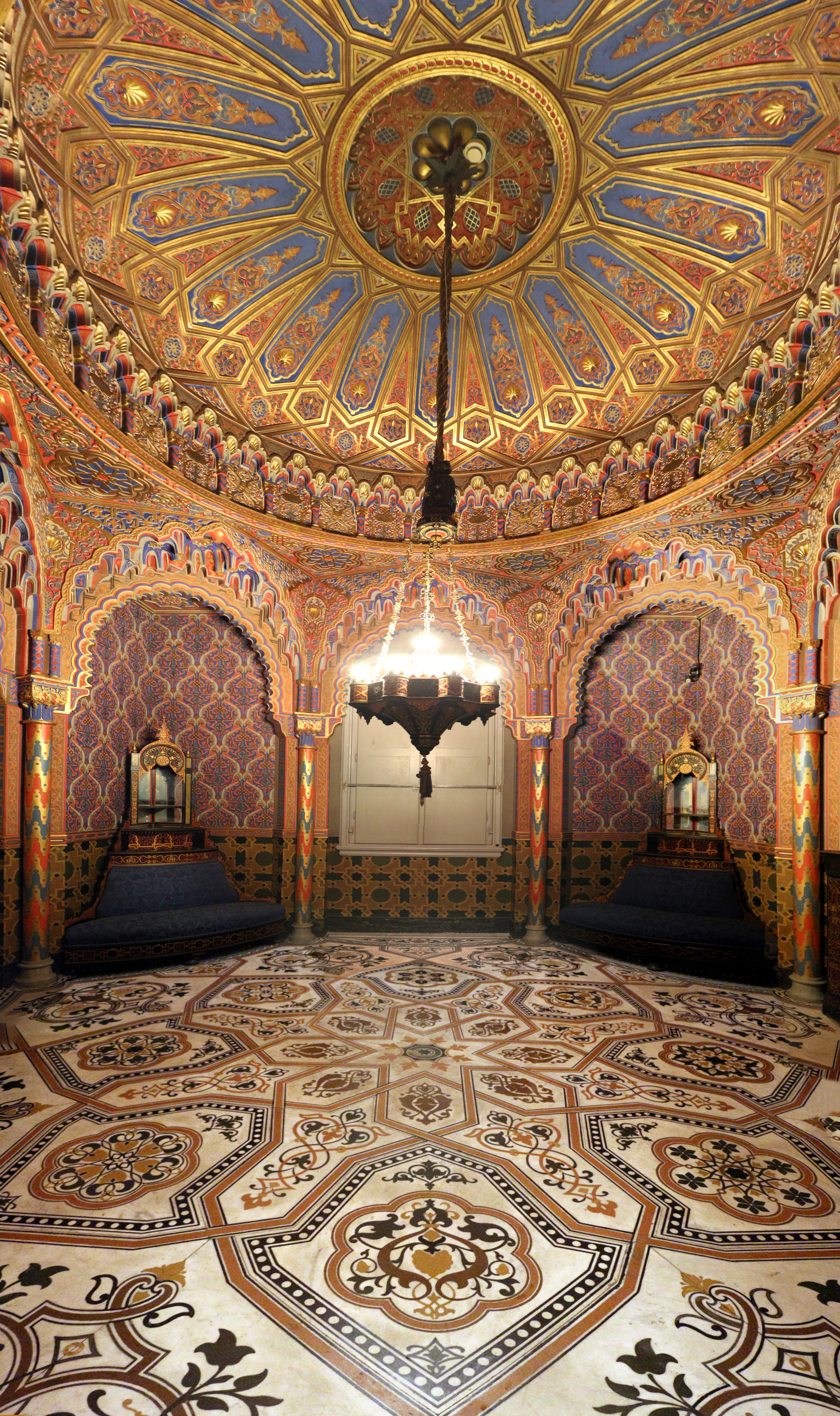
Moresque room in the Museo civico Giovanni Fattori

Dedicated to painter Giovanni Fattori, the museum mainly featuring contemporary art from the 19th-century was inaugurated in 1994 and is placed inside Villa Mimbelli, an 18th-century construction surrounded by a vast park. The origin of the museum dates back to 1877 when the Comune of Livorno founded a Civic Gallery where to collect all the artistic objects kept in several places around the town; in the same period was written the guideline of the gallery which hosted a collection of paintings of authors by Livorno.

=== Museo Ebraico "Yeshivà Marini" ===
The Yeshivà Marini Museum is housed in a neoclassical building already place of worship as Marini Oratory since 1867; once was home of the Confraternity Malbish Arumin which was provided to help the city's poor. In the post-war period was utilized as a synagogue in the waiting for the construction of the new one. The museum has a collection of liturgical objects coming from the old Synagogue destroyed in World War II. The commerce practiced by the Jewish community increased the property of the synagogue allowing a varied religious heritage of Dutch, Florentine, Venetian, Roman and Northern African origin. The display regard the Torah ark, the sefer Torah, paintings, religious objects as the Oriental-style wooden hekhal; the oldest and most important pieces went lost.

=== Museo di storia naturale del Mediterraneo ===
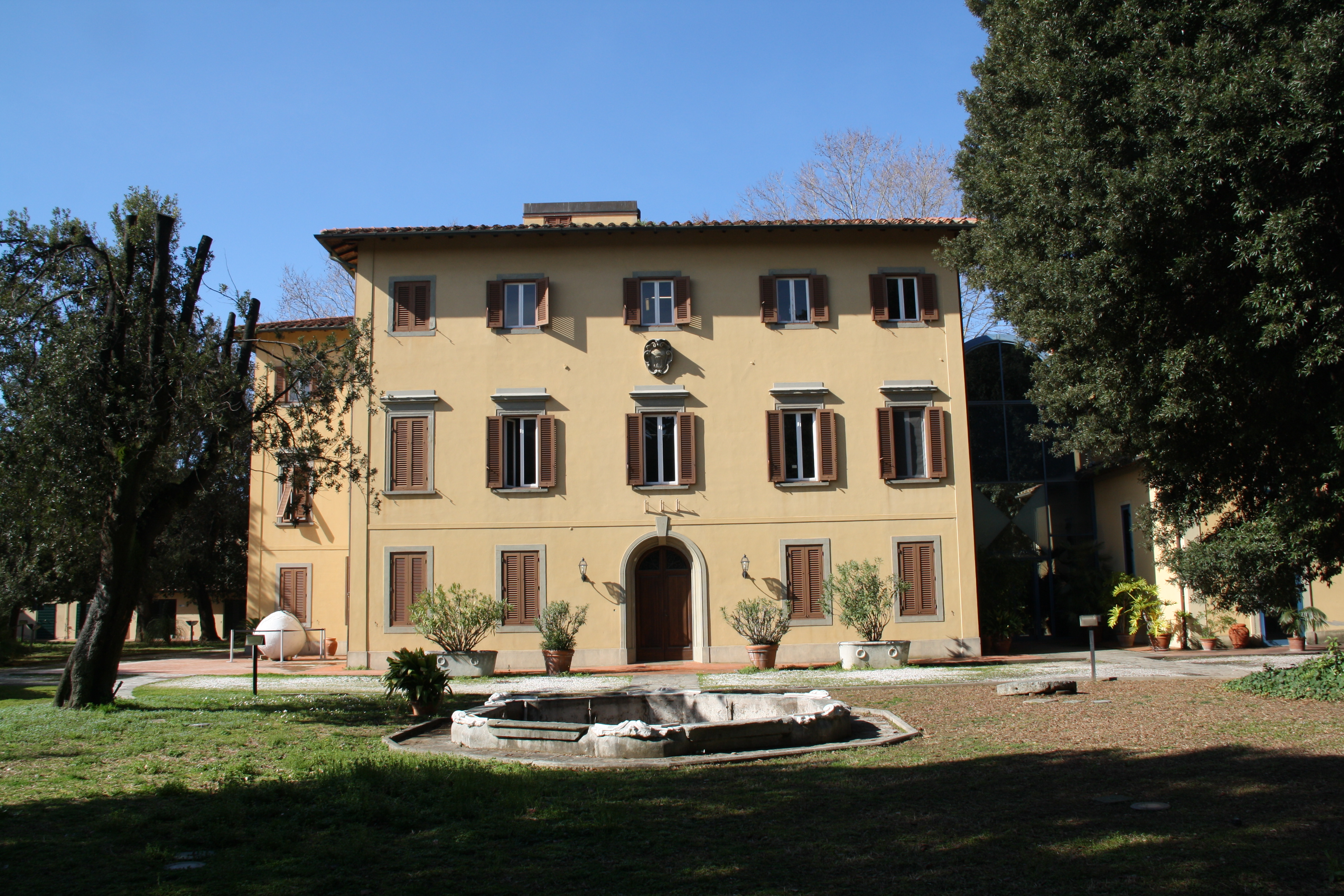
Museo di storia naturale del Mediterraneo

The origins of the museum date back to 1929 and part of the objects went destroyed by World War II. After the war, the museum was reopened inside the Livorno Aquarium and only in 1980 was transferred to Villa Henderson. The museum is divided in several halls regarding the Man, the Man in the Mediterranean context, the Invertebrates, the Sea, the Flight in Nature. Inside the museum is a Planetarium and an Auditorium.

=== Museo Mascagnano ===
The Museo Mascagnano houses memorabilia, documents and operas by the great composer Pietro Mascagni, who lived here. Every year some of his operas are traditionally played during the lyric music season, which is organized by the Goldoni Theatre. Also the Terrazza Mascagni is situated on the boulevard on the seafront, which is named in his honour.

=== Orto Botanico del Mediterraneo ===
The Orto Botanico del Mediterraneo is a botanical garden located on the grounds of the Museo di storia naturale del Mediterraneo.

=== Civil architecture ===
==== Venezia Nuova ====
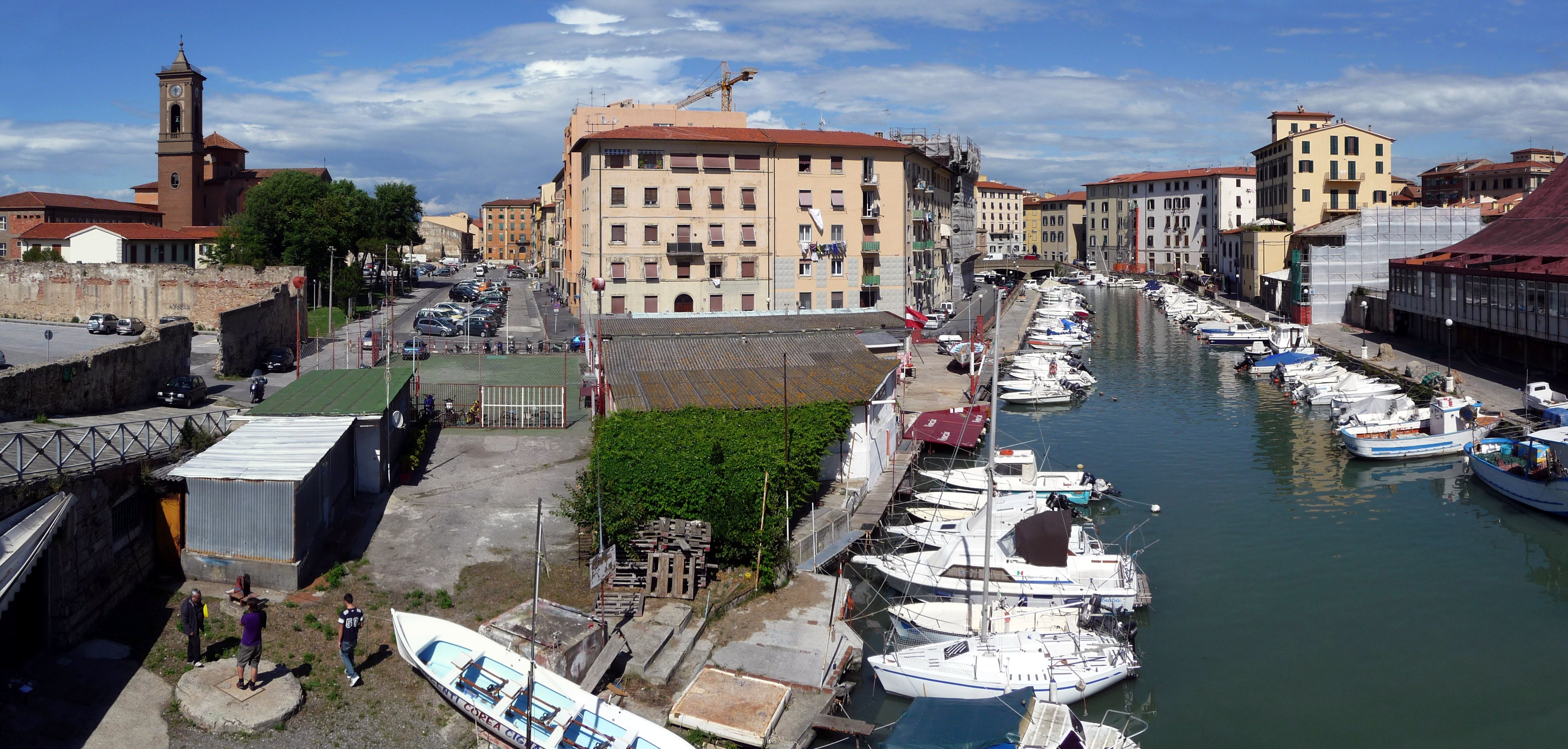
Venezia Nuova

Ferdinando II de' Medici considered, in 1629, the opportunity to enlarge the town, on project by Giovanni Battista Santi, toward north in an area included among Fortezza Vecchia and Fortezza Nuova, in order to give an adequate space to the maritime and commercial activities. There was the need to build a mercantile district, close to Porto Mediceo, provided with houses and depots to store the merchandise and a system of canals to facilitate their transport. The new rione (district), called Venezia Nuova, was built in an area gained to the sea, intersected by canals and linked to the town with bridges, for this reason, Venetians skilled workers were recruited.

The Chiesa di Sant'Anna, dedicated to Saint Anne, was built in 1631 on the ground of the Arch confraternity of the Company of the Nativity; in the same year Giovanni Battista Santi died and the control of the project passed to Giovanni Francesco Cantagallina though the works slowed down due to the lack of funds.

A new impulse to the works was given in 1656 concerning the distribution of the spaces where to build other houses and stores; consequently arose the problem of the diverse oriented road scheme with respect to the axis of Piazza d’Arme, it was resolved by adopting a road plan perpendicular to the Navicelli channel. The paving of the roads and along the canals in Venezia Nuova was provided in 1668, while the Pescheria Nuova (New fish market) was built in 1705 close to the Scali del Pesce where the fish was unloaded.

In the 1700s Venezia Nuova was the district of the Consuls of the Nations and of the most important international retailers who had the warehouses filled with goods from everywhere waiting to be shipped by sea to the most different destinations. The palaces along the canals had the turrets from which to see the ships approaching the port, moreover, they had the stores at the canal level to facilitate the unloading of the goods from the boats.

The Venezia Nuova district retains much of its original town planning and architectural features such as the bridges, narrow lanes, the houses of the nobility, churches as Santa Caterina da Siena and San Ferdinando, and a dense network of canals that once served to link its warehouses to the port. The Livorno Courthouse is located in Venezia Nuova.

==== Monumento dei quattro mori ====
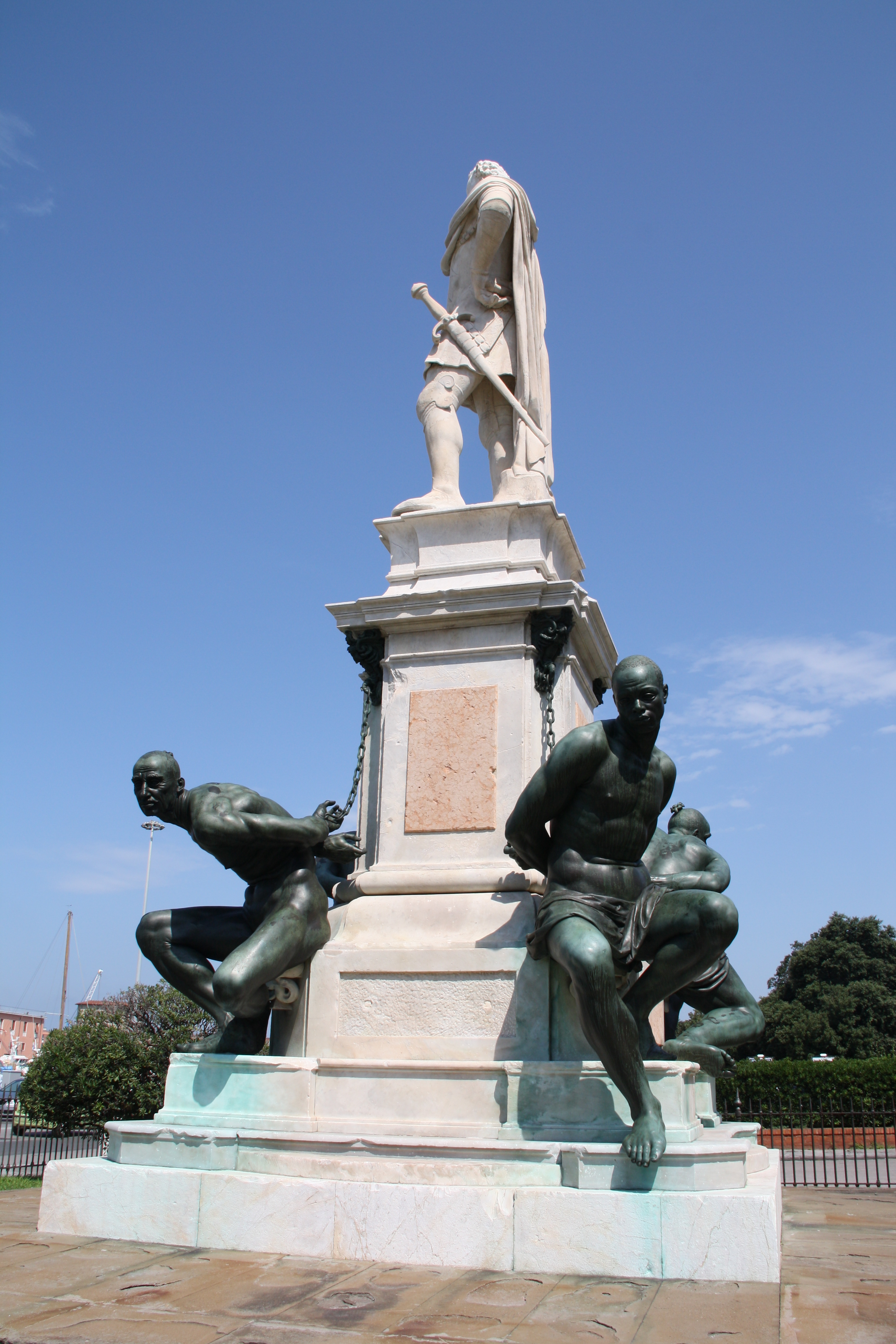
The Monumento dei Quattro Mori recently restored

The Monument of the Four Moors is dedicated to Ferdinando I de' Medici, Grand Duke of Tuscany, and is one of the most popular monuments of Livorno. Ferdinando I commissioned it to Giovanni Bandini in 1595 to carry out a monument in white Carrara marble to represent him in the uniform of the Grand master of the Order of Saint Stephen which in that period prevailed in several naval battles against the Barbary pirates. The monument was completed in 1599, shortly before the death of Bandini which occurred on 18 April, and arrived to Livorno by sea from Carrara in 1601.

Ferdinando I projected to add four statues of moors prisoners at the pedestal of his monument and gave the task to Pietro Tacca in 1602 but the monument remained in a corner of the square till 29 May 1617 when it was inaugurated by Cosimo II de' Medici, Grand Duke of Tuscany. In the meantime Tacca received the approval to add the four moors to the pedestal; the first two statues were fused in Florence in 1622 and carried on the barges along the Arno to Livorno; according to the tradition the young moor was named Morgiano and the older Alì Salentino; the other two sculptures were installed in 1626. During the French occupation of Livorno, from 1796 to 1799, the monument was removed from Sextius Mollis commander of the French garrison because it represented an insult to the tyranny, as soon as the French left the town the monument was put back in its former place.

During World War II the monument was transferred to a protected place in order to avoid being damaged by allied attacks, the statue of Ferdinando I was hidden in the Pisa Charterhouse and the four moors in the Medici Villa at Poggio a Caiano. The monument has been restored recently in 1990 and 2013.

==== Acquedotto Leopoldino ====
The Acquedotto Leopoldino and the neoclassical cisterns of Livorno were part of a sophisticated scheme to provide water to Livorno.

==== La Gran Conserva ====
La Gran Conserva, or Il Cisternone, situated on what were the outskirts of 19th-century Livorno, is the largest and best known of the city's covered cisterns.

==== Cisternino di città ====
Cisternino di città is an austere neoclassical design which was approved in 1837 and completed in 1848.

==== Piazza della Repubblica ====
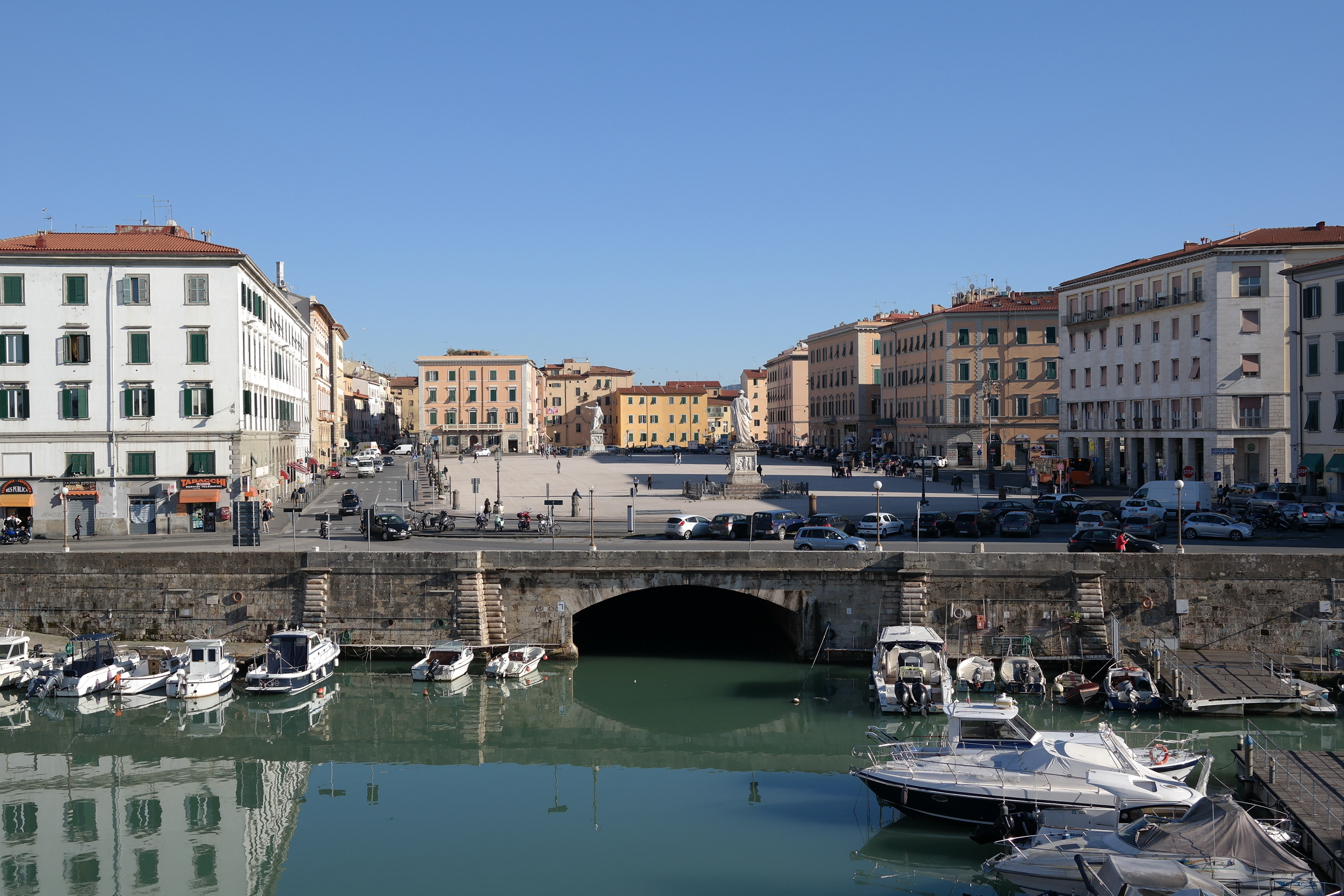
Piazza della Repubblica

At the beginning of the 19th century arose the need to connect the Medicean road system of the Pentagono del Buontalenti to the new eastern districts of the town, on the other side of the Fosso Reale, and the requirement to dismantle the city gate Porta a Pisa. The solution adopted in 1844 was that of Luigi Bettarini which considered the coverage of the Fosso Reale with an imposing vault, 240 meters long and 90 meters wide, creating an elliptical paving. The portion of the canal covered by the new structure continued to be navigable.

The new square was commonly called Piazza del Voltone until 1850, then Piazza dei Granduchi in honour of the Lorraine dynasty until 1859, in the period of the Italian unification was named to Carlo Alberto until June 1946 when was given the current name Piazza della Repubblica. The square, adorned with 52 marble benches, 92 pillars and two statues dedicated to Ferdinand III by Francesco Pozzi were inaugurated on 8 September 1847 and that dedicated to Leopold II by Paolo Emilio Demi was installed on 6 June 1848. The statue of Leopoldo II was damaged by the crowd on 6 May 1849 and removed from the square because the Emperor was seen as the symbol of the Austrian domination; the statue was placed in Piazza XX Settembre in 1957.

==== Terrazza Mascagni ====
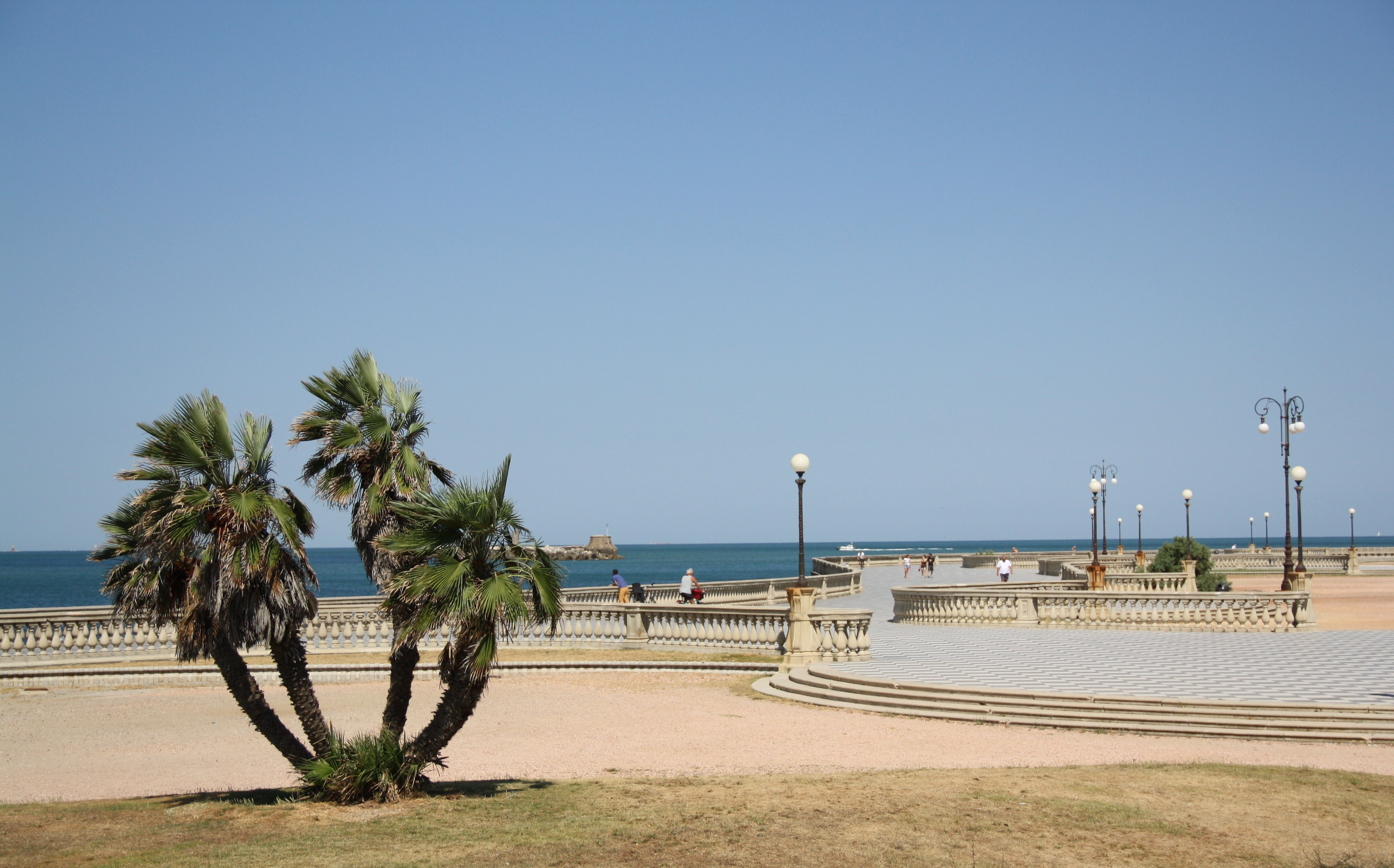
Terrazza Mascagni

The Terrazza Mascagni is a wide sinuous belvedere toward the sea with views to the Livorno hills, the Tuscan Archipelago to Corsica, and the Port of Livorno. It is located on the site of the Forte dei Cavalleggieri (Cavalrymen Fort) built in the 17th century by Cosimo I de' Medici to deter pirate raids, subsequently replaced by a leisure park in the 1800s, and a heliotherapy centre in the early 1900s. A new parterre, built between 1925 and 1928 by Enrico Salvais and Luigi Pastore, was formed by a series of flower beds and a walkway which follow the outline of the sea with numerous balustrades named after Costanzo Ciano. The Terrazza has a paved surface of 8,700 square meters formed by 34,800 black and white tiles placed as a checkerboard and 4,100 balusters. In 1932, a gazebo for musical performances was built in the large square; it was destroyed during World War II. In 1937 the Livorno Aquarium was constructed. After the war, the Terrazza was dedicated to Pietro Mascagni and in 1994 it underwent a complete restoration using the same kind of materials originally employed; the works were completed on 10 July 1998 with the reconstruction of the gazebo.

==== Palazzo Comunale ====
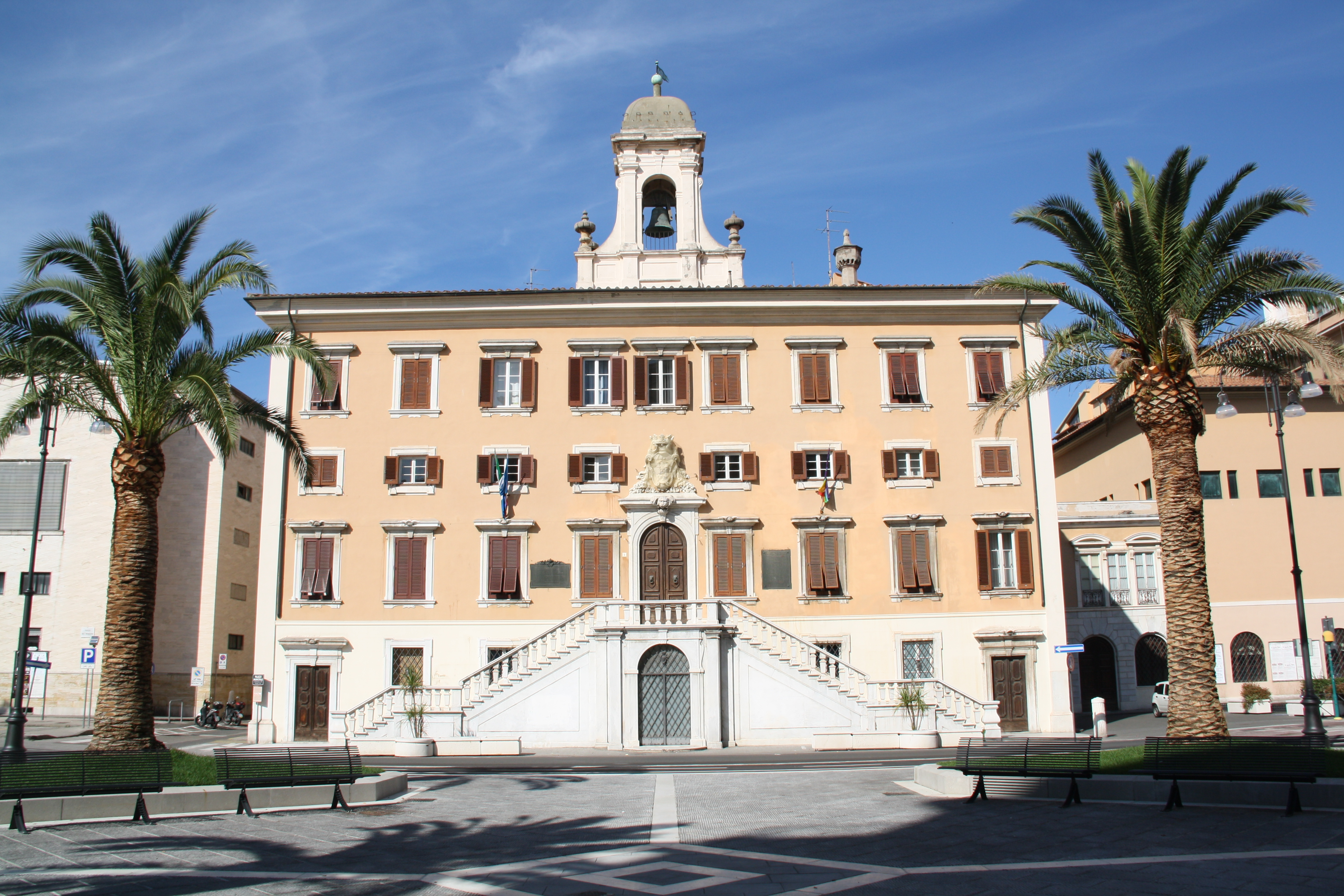
Palazzo Comunale and the restored square

Livorno was elevated to the status of city on 19 March 1606 by Ferdinando I de' Medici, the first Gonfaloniere Bernardetto Borromei and the Community representatives held their meetings in the Church of Saint Mary and Saint Julia. On 13 June 1646 a building, placed in Via del Porticciolo, was purchased for the sum of seven thousand ducats, in order to accommodate the Community. It was evident that it was inadequate to the task and the Council deliberated, on 27 January 1720, the construction of the new town hall on the project by Giovanni del Fantasia.

The new neo-renaissance palace, positioned between Palazzo della Dogana and Palazzo Granducale on the north side of Piazza d’Arme, was partially destroyed by the 1742 earthquake. Restored in 1745 by Bernardino Ciurini and Antonio Fabbri a double white marble stairway and a small bell tower on the top of the façade were added. In 1867 the complex was enlarged with the acquisition of three other buildings in the back. With the settlement of the Podestà in the fascist period was carried out a new enlargement in 1929 by Enrico Salvais and Luigi Pastore transforming the adjacent former fire station in the council hall. Damaged by the bombing during World War II it was rebuilt and renovated under the direction of Primavera and was inaugurated in 1949 by the mayor Furio Diaz.

=== Religious architecture ===
==== Cathedral of Saint Francis of Assisi ====
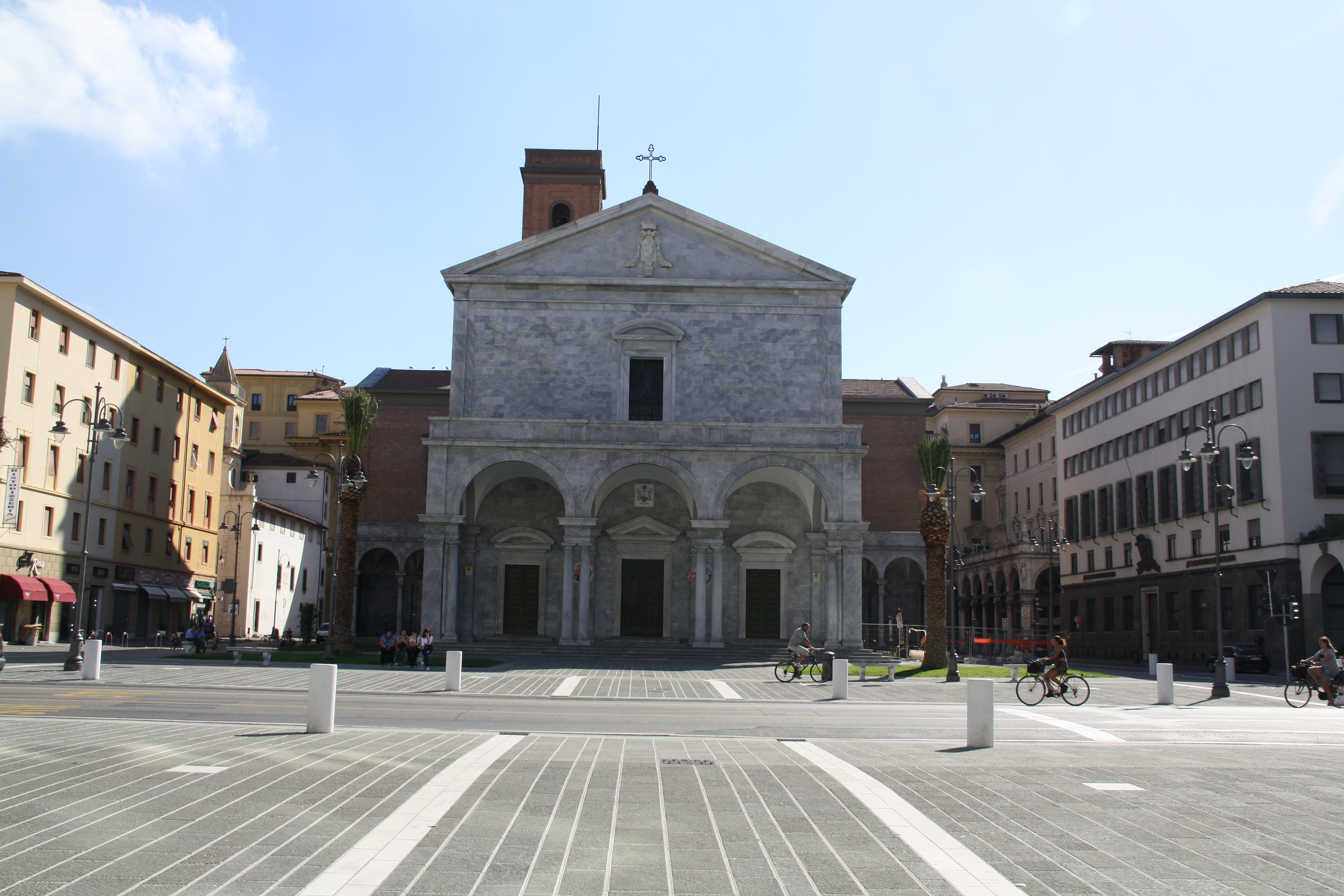
The Cathedral of Saint Francis of Assisi and Piazza Grande restored

The cathedral of the town, commonly called Duomo di Livorno, is dedicated to Francis of Assisi, Mary, mother of Jesus, and Julia of Corsica, and was built in a central position of the Pentagono del Buontalenti on the south side of Piazza Grande once named Piazza d’Arme. The original plan was drawn up by Bernardo Buontalenti when he projected the new town. The construction began in June 1581 on a reviewed plan by Alessandro Pieroni under the direction of Antonio Cantagallina. The church had a rectangular plant with a single nave, the original wooden ceiling, executed from 1610 to 1614, was carved by Vincenzo Ricordati and gilded with seven inserted paintings. Jacopo Ligozzi, Domenico Cresti and Jacopo Chimenti decorated, from 1610 to 1614, three large paintings representing "St Francis with Child and the Virgin", the "Assumption of Mary" and the "Apotheosis of Ste Julia", the other four paintings were works by minor artists. The simple façade had a marble porch with twin Doric columns surmounted by a terrace added in 1605 from a project by Alessandro Pieroni.

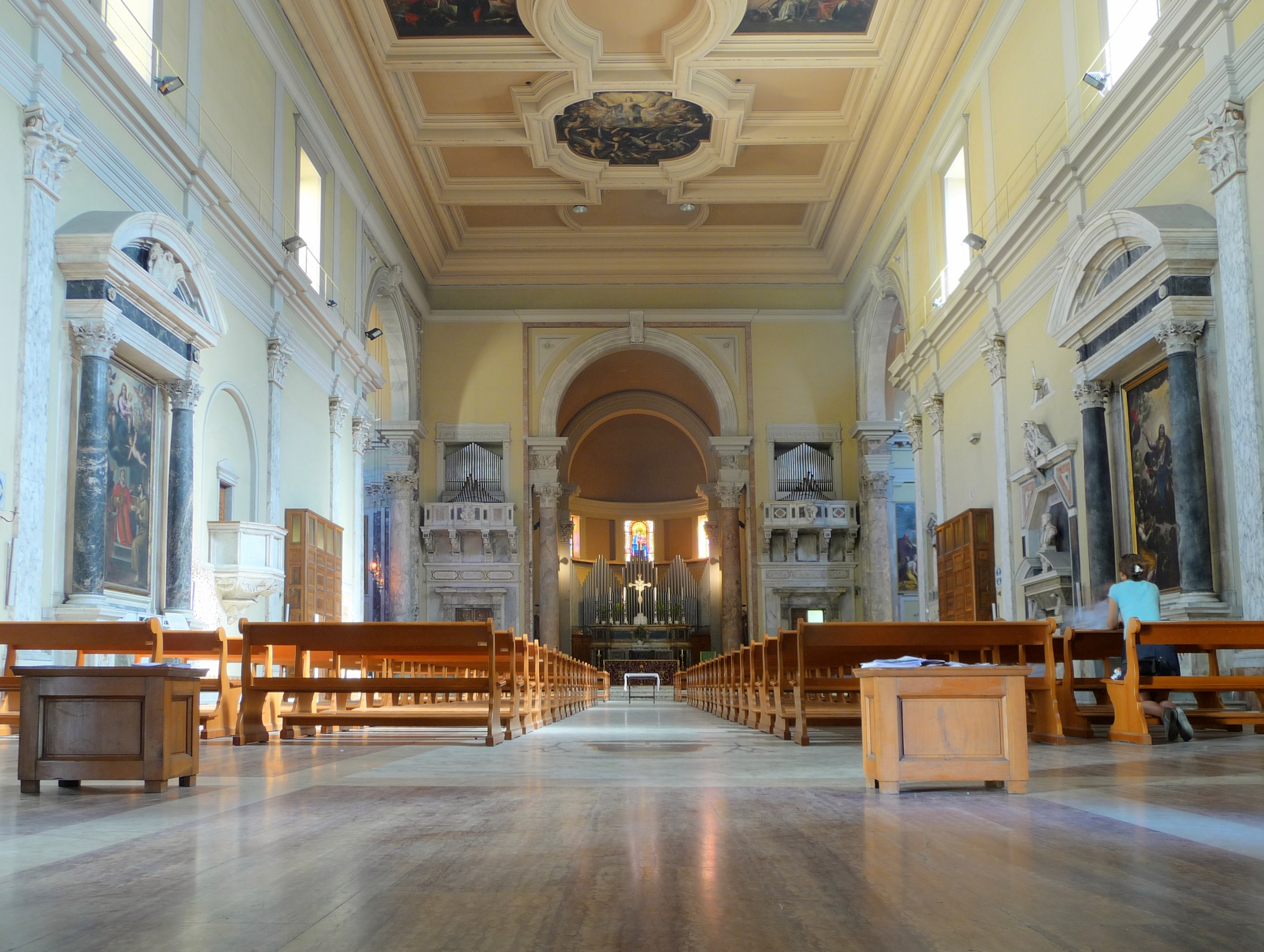
Cathedral's nave

The church was consecrated on 19 February 1606 by Monsignor Nunzio Antonio Grimani; on request by Ferdinando II de' Medici, Grand Duke of Tuscany, in 1629, it was elevated to collegiate church and the Curato was substituted from a Proposto having the functions of the Vicar of the archbishop of Pisa. The plant of the church was modified in Christian cross when in 1716 was added the first of two lateral chapels. The left side chapel, dedicated to the Eucharist, was built on a project by Giovanni del Fantasia with frescoes by Giovanni Maria Terreni and the altar attributed to Giovanni Baratta, The right side chapel, dedicated to Immaculate Conception, was built in 1727 and was decorated with paintings by Luigi Ademollo. The Collegiata in 1806 was elevated to cathedral and in 1817 a 50-meter bell tower was added from a project by Gaspero Pampaloni. The cathedral was completely destroyed in 1943 from the Allied bombardment during World War II; it was then rebuilt respecting the original structure except for the two marble porches added to the transepts and was consecrated on 21 December 1952 by Bishop Giovanni Piccioni.

Since 2006, on the occasion of the bicentennial of the Roman Catholic Diocese of Livorno, the "Christ Crowned with Thorns", by Fra Angelico, was displayed in the Chapel of the Eucharist.

==== Church of the Madonna ====
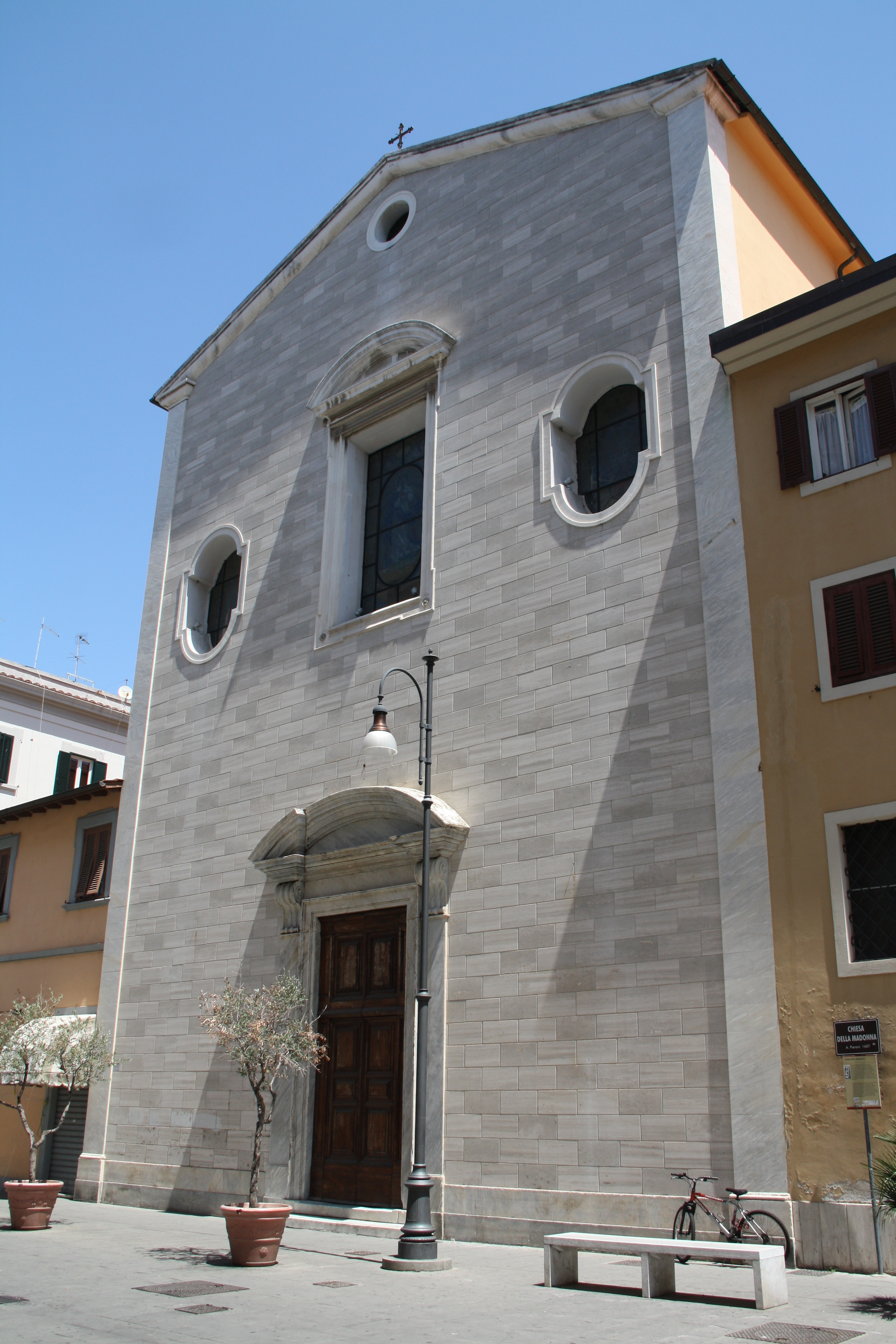
Church of the Madonna

The Church of the Madonna is placed on the street of the same name which connects directly the city centre with the district Venezia Nuova through the John of Nepomuk bridge. According to tradition the church was built to host the statute of Our Lady of Mount Carmel subtracted from a Turkish ship. The church was important as it was a place of worship for foreign communities. Ferdinando I de' Medici gave the church to the Franciscan which had the nearby Oratory of Saints Cosmas and Damian. The construction began on 25 March 1607 on a project by Alessandro Pieroni and was completed in 1611; the church at first was dedicated to Saint Mary, Saint Francis and Saints Cosmas and Damian but in 1638 was dedicated to the Immaculate Conception following enlargement of the building.

The church has a rectangular plan with a single nave and groin vault, on each side, there are the three altars of the foreign Nations. The altar of the French Nation was built in 1613 and the painting, by Matteo Rosselli, represents Saint Louis. The altar of the Corsican Nation, which at the time was under the control of the Republic of Genoa, has a painting representing John the Evangelist. The altar of the Portuguese Nation, built in the 17th century, had a wooden statue of Saint Mary until 1728 when this was positioned near the main altar and replaced by one of Anthony of Padua. The altar of the Dutch-German Nation is dedicated to Andrew the Apostle. Outside the body of the building, separated by a railing, is a Chapel dedicate to the Madonna di Montenero built in 1631. The simple façade was covered in white marble in 1972.

==== Church of the Most Holy Annunciation ====
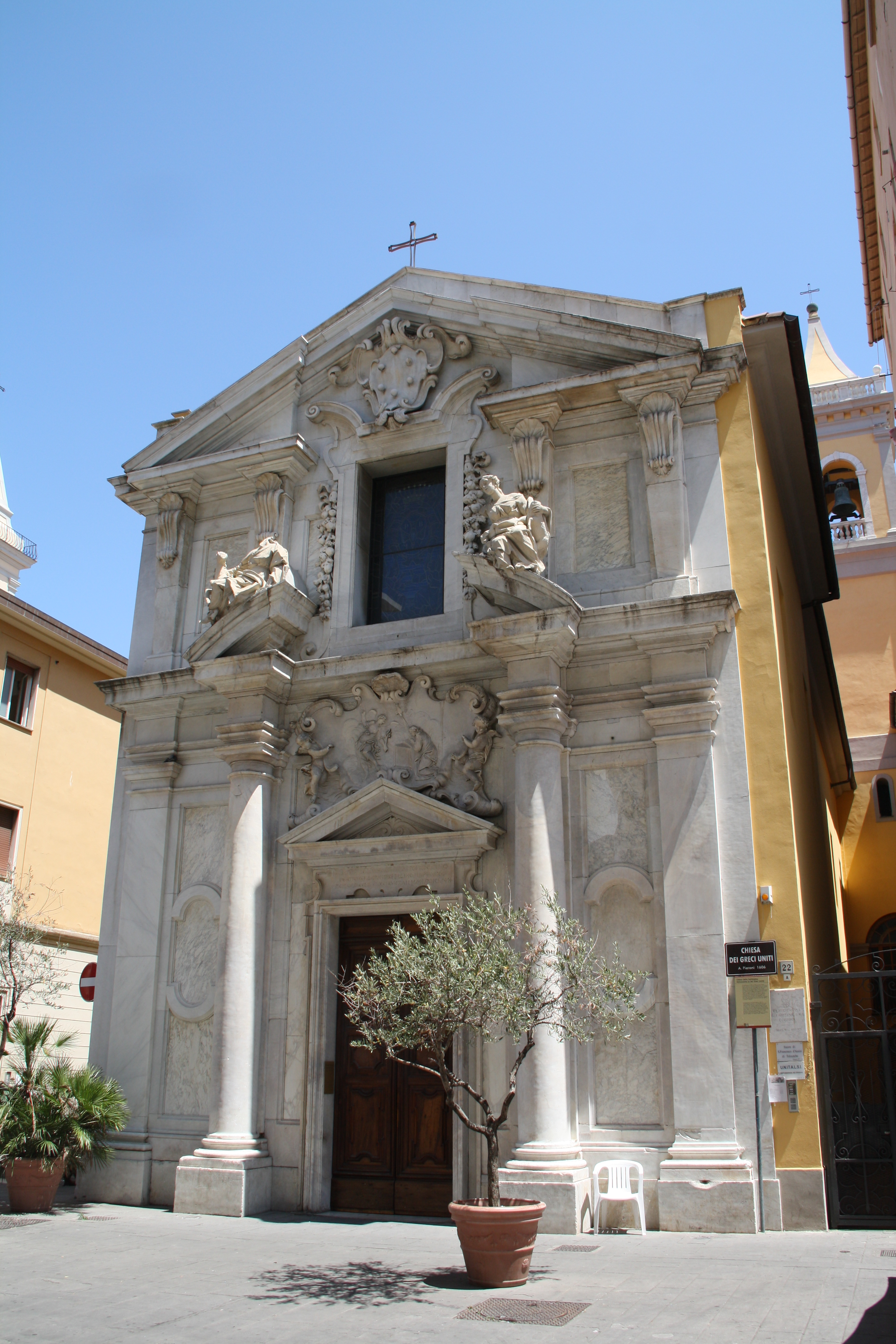
Chiesa della Santissima Annunziata

The Church of the Most Holy Annunciation is located in the central street of Via della Madonna, not far from the Armenian community Church of Gregory the Illuminator and the Church of the Madonna. The church is called Unite Greeks too because was the worship place for the Greek community of Byzantine Rite who once lived in Livorno. At the end of the 16th century, numerous Greeks came to Tuscany to take service aboard the galleys of the Order of Saint Stephen. The church was built in 1601 on a project by Alessandro Pieroni, was completed in 1605 and consecrated on 25 March 1606. The baroque façade was built in 1708 presumably on a project by Giovanni Baratta with a triangular pediment and Doric order and was decorated by the statues of Meekness and Innocence by Andrea Vaccà. The interior has a single nave and the ceiling is adorned by a coffer structure with a central painting representing the Annunciation by Giovanni Domenico Ferretti (1750). The precious wooden Iconostasis in Byzantine style date back to 1641 and has three doors painted by Agostino Wanonbrachen in 1751; on the central door is represented the Most Holy Annunciation and Basil of Caesarea, Gregory of Nazianzus, John Chrysostom and Athanasius of Alexandria; in the right door is painted the Nativity of Jesus and the four Apostles, in the left door is represented the Adoration of the Shepherds. The church was entirely destroyed by the bombings during World War II and the restoration was completed in 1985.

==== Other Religious Structures ====
- Santa Caterina da Siena: Baroque church in the centre of Livorno, in Venezia Nuova district.
- San Ferdinando: Baroque church located also in Venezia Nuova district next to the Piazza del Luogo Pio.
- San Giovanni Battista: Baroque-Mannerist church located at the crossing of Via San Giovanni and Via Carraia in central Livorno.
- Santa Maria del Soccorso: Neoclassical Marian votive church in central Livorno. The tall brick church façade is located scenically at the end of Via Magenta, and has a park surrounding it. In front is a Monument to Fallen Soldiers (caduti) in the first World War.
- Old English Cemetery: oldest foreign Protestant burial ground in Italy. It was founded around 1645 and contains over 300 Carrara marble graves of notable people from 10 different nationalities. Tobias Smollett and Francis Horner were buried here, but also some of the friends of Byron and Shelley and the husband of Saint Elizabeth Seton. The cemetery was closed in 1839 and a new one, still active, was opened.
- Sanctuary of Montenero: Marian sanctuary atop a hill outside Livorno, dedicated to Our Lady of Graces, the patron saint of Tuscany, is a destination for pilgrims. It is famous for the adjacent gallery, decorated with ex-voto, chiefly related to events of miraculous rescues of people at sea.
- Temple of the Dutch German Congregation: known more simply as the Dutch-German Church, is situated in Livorno, on the stretch of the Fosso Reale canal that runs between Piazza della Repubblica and Piazza Cavour.
- Synagogue of Livorno: main Jewish place of worship in Livorno, located in Piazza Elijah Benamozegh.

=== Military architecture ===
==== Fortezza Vecchia ====
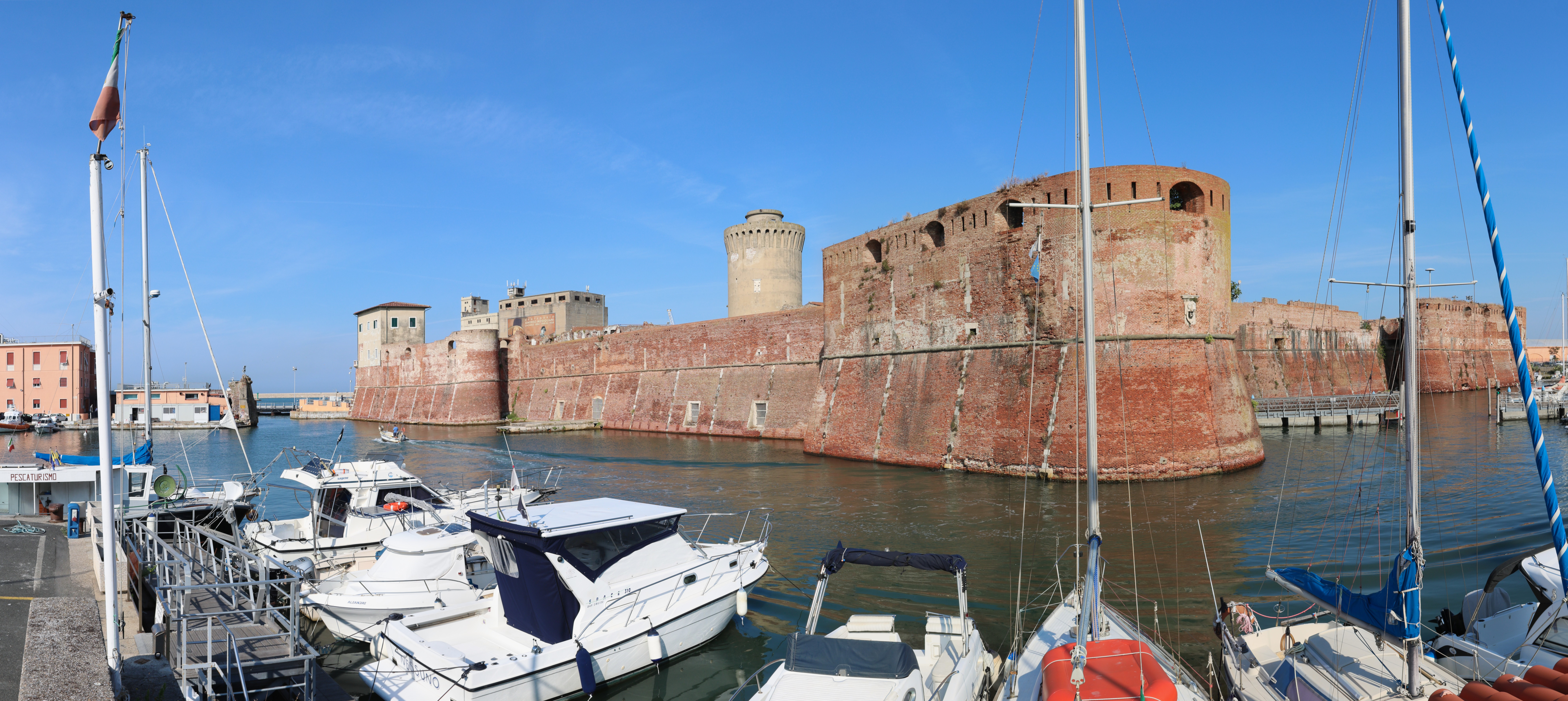
Fortezza Vecchia

The origin of Fortezza Vecchia takes place not far from what once was Porto Pisano (Pisan Port) where a square tower was built in 1077, on request of Matilda of Tuscany, on the remains of a Roman tower; in 1241 the Pisans built a massive cylindrical tower, 30 meters high erroneously called Mastio di Matilde (Matilda keep). Pisa realized the strategic importance of the castle of Livorno which owned since 1103 and in 1377 the Doge Gambacorti of the Republic of Pisa built a quadrangular Fort called Quadratura dei Pisani (Quartered of the Pisans) on plans attributed to Puccio di Landuccio and Francesco di Giovanni Giordani. In 1392 this fort was connected to a wall in order to defend better the town and the Darsena. Livorno, in 1405, was sold to Genoa which reinforced the defences, building three forts under the Quartered, afterwards Livorno was bought from Florence on 28 August 1421 at the price of 100.000 Tuscan florin. The project to build Fortezza Vecchia was commissioned to Antonio da Sangallo the Elder in 1506, the fortress had to incorporate the existing Pisan and Genovese constructions.

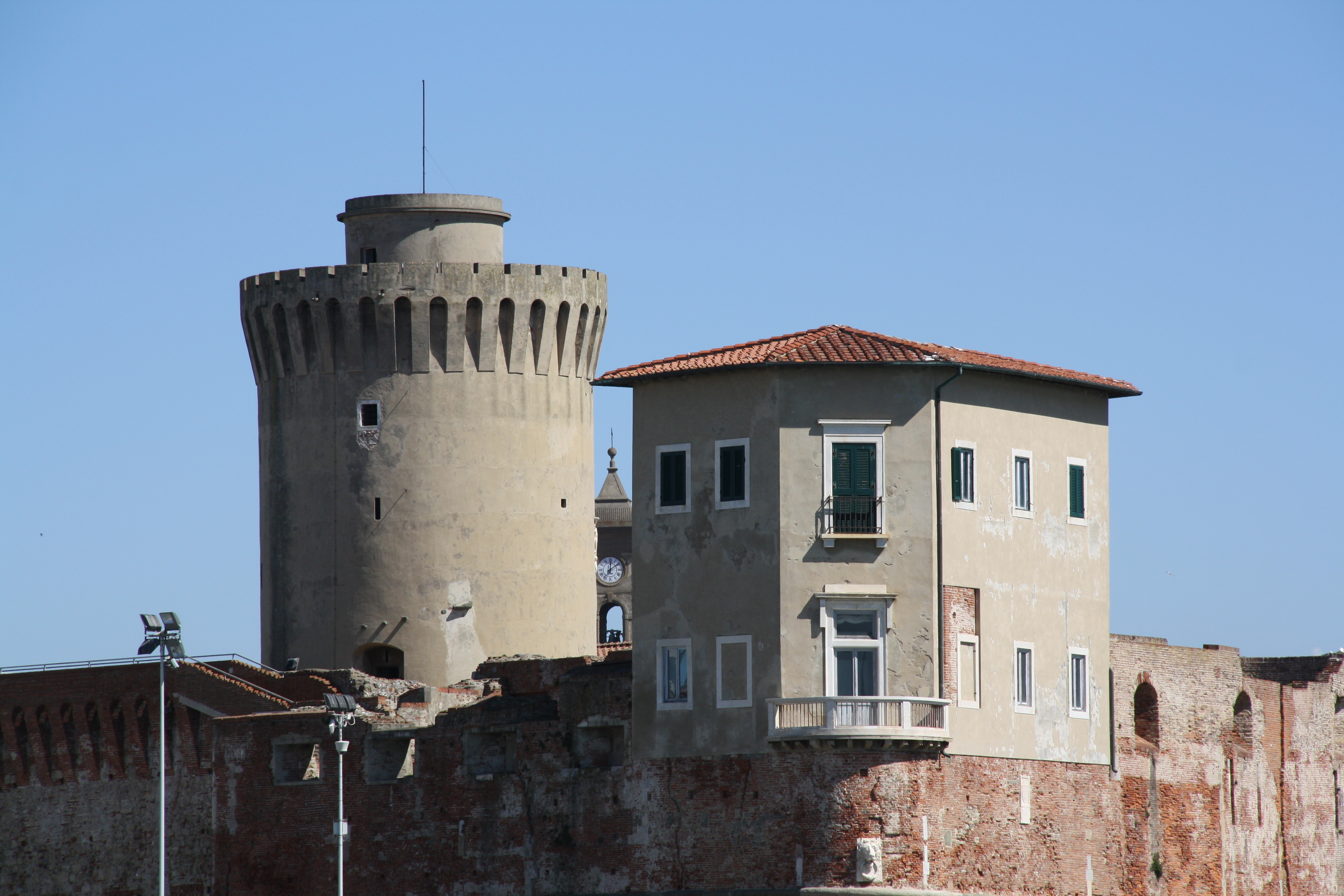
Matilda keep and Canaviglia bastion

The works started in 1518 on the order of Cardinal Giulio De' Medici under the supervision of Nicolao da Pietrasanta. The construction was suspended since the popular revolt forced the Medici in exile and was resumed in 1530 on their return. Fortezza Vecchia is a massive fortification completed on 1 April 1534 under Alessandro de' Medici; it was built in red-brick with sloping walls and the interposition of clear stones, it has a quadrangular plant with a perimeter of 1500 meters and was equipped with 24 cannons to protect each side. One of the corners directs inside to join the Quartered of the Pisans and Matilda and Genoa keep; the three others are protected by triangular bastions with rounded tips. The bastion towards the north is called Capitana because there moored the main Galley, to the east is Ampolletta since housed the sand-glass used to control the guard duty, to the west is the Canaviglia derived from Cavaniglia the name of the commander of the galleys of the Grand Ducky of Tuscany. The land on the side toward the town was excavated in order to have the fortress surrounded by the sea for better defence. Cosimo I de' Medici built in 1544 an imposing palace, overlooking the Vecchia Darsena, above the Quartered of the Pisans which went destroyed during World War II. The successor Francesco I de' Medici built a small palace toward the sea, later became Porto Mediceo, on the top of Canaviglia bastion situated at the entrance of Vecchia Darsena. On the opposite side was built a church dedicated to Saint Francis where on 19 March 1606 Ferdinando I de' Medici elevated Livorno to the status of city. Fortezza Vecchia changed its function to the coming of the House of Habsburg-Lorraine in 1737, by a defensive structure to a military college for officers of the Army of the Grand Duchy of Tuscany (1769) and afterwards in garrison (1795).

==== Fortezza Nuova ====
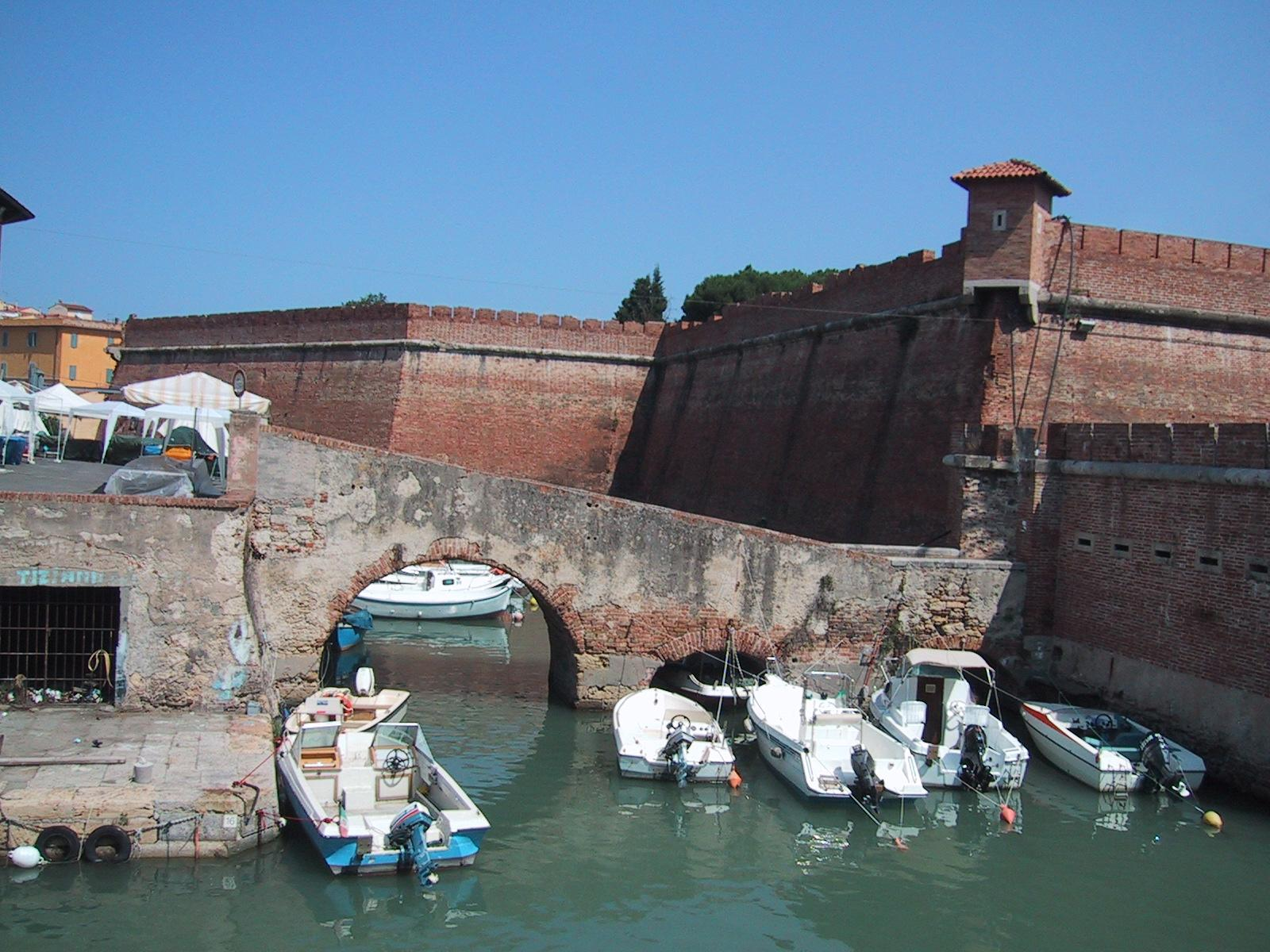
Fortezza Nuova

The origin of Fortezza Nuova (New fortress) took place towards the end of the 1500s, by the adjustment of the Baluardo San Francesco (Saint Francis rampart) and the Baluardo Santa Barbara (Saint Barbara rampant). The project was commissioned by Cosimo I to Bernardo Buontalenti with the intention to develop a new urban plan of the town that led to a pentagonal shape surrounded by canals.

The original project was then modified by Don Giovanni de' Medici, Claudio Cogorano and Alessandro Pieroni to allow the construction of the Fortezza Nuova in order to strengthen the military apparatus of the town. The works started on 10 January 1590 and ended in 1604, the result is a considerable fortification, in stones and red bricks, with a polygonal plant surrounded by water; the new modification brought to the construction of the Forte San Pietro (Saint Peter fort) to defend the Venezia Nuova quarter.

In 1629 part of the fortress was demolished to permit the building of the Venezia Nuova and the San Marco quarters that was commissioned by Ferdinando II. The Fortezza Nuova has been used for military purpose until the end of World War II, inside were built barracks and warehouses and a chapel dedicated to the Immaculate Conception.

The fortress was heavily damaged during World War II with the destruction of most parts of the buildings, the restoration was completed in 1972 and the superior part is used at present as a public park and centre for events and displays.

==== Pentagono del Buontalenti ====
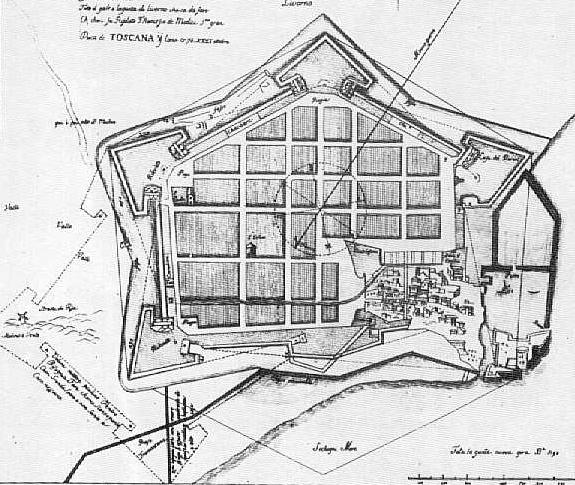
The copy of the project by Buontalenti

Francesco I de' Medici gave to Bernardo Buontalenti in 1575 the task to project the ideal town in order to transform Livorno from a fishing village in a fortified town to accommodate 12,000 inhabitants, to include the original settlement and the Fortezza Vecchia, capable to become the trade centre of the Grand Duchy of Tuscany. The development of the project led to a pentagonal plant as in use in the Renaissance period, each side 600 meters long, with defensive walls, rampant and five bastions at the vertices, surrounded by canals; the fifth bastion coincided with Fortezza Vecchia. The plan gave no information regarding the function of the new urban area, indicating only a series of building blocks within a road system absolutely orthogonal, cardo and Decumanus Maximus. The road axis from north to south (cardo) underline the direction that united the centre of the town with a significant place as the Sanctuary of Montenero; the axis from west to east (decumanus) linked the Baluardo Santa Giulia to Baluardo Sant’Andrea. In August 1576 the Office of the Fabbrica di Livorno was established with the task of supervising construction and Alessandro Puccini was the chief superintendent.

Francesco I de' Medici laid the first stone for the construction of the Baluardo di San Francesco (Saint Francis rampant) of the new town on 28 March 1577; the works went on with several changes compared with the original plan including the construction of the Fortezza Nuova. Livorno became a town, encircled by the navigable Fosso Reale (Royal canal), with numerous palaces, warehouse, garrisons and custom-houses. The central street at that time was Via Ferdinanda extended for 750 meters, later called Via Grande, from Porta Colonnella (Colonella city gate), in the proximity of Vecchia Darsena, to Porta Pisana (Pisan city gate). The Baluardo Sant’Andrea was initiated in 1578 while the Baluardo Santa Giulia started in 1582.

In 1594 it was decided to create a huge square, at halfway of Via Ferdinanda, where to build the church of the new town. The church, which was built in a central position on the south side of Piazza d’Arme, later Piazza Grande, was completed in 1602 under the direction of Antonio Cantagaliina and Alessandro Pieroni. Piazza d’Arme was completed and enlarged with the old Porticciolo dei Genovesi (Port of Genovesi) filled up with earth to make room to the building called Tre Palazzi (Three palaces); the square was adorned with a series of marble arcades attributed to Alessandro Pieroni. The Palazzo del Picchetto was built, on plan by Giovanni Battista Foggini and Giovanni del Fantasia in 1707, at the end of Via Ferdinanda in the proximity of Porta Pisana.

==== Accademia Navale ====
The Italian Naval Academy is a mixed-sex military university in Livorno, which is responsible for the technical training of military officers of the Italian Navy.

==== Main sights ====
- Acquario comunale Diacinto Cestoni
- Cathedral of Saint Francis of Assisi
- Cisternone
- Fanale dei Pisani
- Fortezza Vecchia
- Fortezza Nuova
- Fosso Reale
- Museo di storia naturale del Mediterraneo
- Museo Civico Giovanni Fattori
- Old English Cemetery
- Orto Botanico del Mediterraneo
- Porto Mediceo
- Sanctuary of Montenero
- Terrazza Mascagni
- Venezia Nuova

== Economy ==
=== Port of Livorno ===
The city and its port have continued as an important destination for travelers and tourists attracted to its historic buildings and setting. The port processes thousands of cruise-ship passengers of the following cruise line:

- AIDA Cruises
- Ambassador Cruise Line
- Azamara Club Cruises
- Carnival Cruise Lines
- Celebrity Cruises
- Costa Crociere
- Cunard Line
- Holland America Line
- MSC Cruises
- Norwegian Cruise Line
- P&O Cruises
- Princess Cruises
- Pullmantur Cruises
- Royal Caribbean Cruises Ltd.
- Silversea Cruises
- Thomson Cruises
- Viking Ocean Cruises

many of whom take arranged buses to inland destinations as Florence, Pisa and Siena.

=== Cantiere navale fratelli Orlando ===
Since 1866 Livorno has been noted for its Cantiere navale fratelli Orlando. Azimut-Benetti acquired the Cantiere navale fratelli Orlando, then of Fincantieri, in 2003.

=== Eni petrochemical ===
The Eni plant produces gasoline, diesel fuel, fuel oil and lubricants. Livorno refinery was established in 1936 by Azienda Nazionale Idrogenazione Combustibili (ANIC) but the plant was completely destroyed during World War II. The plant was rebuilt thanks to an agreement between the ANIC and the Standard Oil forming the STANIC. The production of the new plant raised from 700,000 to 2 million tons in 1955; nowadays the capacity of refining is 84,000 barrels per day. The refinery, now property of Eni, is linked to the Darsena petroli (Oil dock) and to Florence depots by two pipelines.

=== WASS Submarine Systems ===
The former WASS (previously Whitehead Alenia Sistemi Subacquei) plant is based in Livorno, produced heavy and light torpedoes, anti-torpedo countermeasure systems for submarines and ships and sonar systems for underwater surveillance. The factory came about in 1924 when the Whitehead Torpedo Works was purchased by Giuseppe Orlando, one of the owners of the Cantiere navale fratelli Orlando of Livorno. Whitehead Moto Fides continued the production of torpedoes in a new plant which opened in 1977 and still operating, now owned by Fincantieri.

=== Financial district ===
Another important role is played by the financial service, concentrated above all in via Cairoli, called the small city of Livorno, in which the headquarters of banks, financial institutions and insurance companies are concentrated, as well as the Post Office Building.

=== Tuaca ===
Tuaca liqueur was produced in Livorno until 2010; the famous distillery was closed and operations were brought to the United States by the new owners. Galliano is still made here and enjoyed by locals and tourists alike.

== Transport ==
=== Airport ===
The nearest airport is the main airport of Tuscany, Pisa International Airport, which is about 20 kilometres (12 mi) away.

=== Buses ===
Since 1875 Livorno has ever had a public transport system managed by some companies such as ATAM, ACIT, ATL and CTT Nord that changed over the years. The Livorno bus network, as with the entire region of Tuscany, is performed by Autolinee Toscane which manages, since 1 November 2021, two High Mobility Lines (LAM Blu and LAM Rossa), seventeen urban lines, one school line and six suburban routes departing from Livorno across the Province. Autolinee Toscane operates a funicular which connect lower Montenero to the Sanctuary.

=== Port ===
The Port of Livorno is one of the largest seaports both in Italy and the Mediterranean Sea as a whole.

The Port has regular ferry links of the following operators with the following cities:

- Corsica Ferries - Sardinia Ferries to Golfo Aranci and Bastia
- Grimaldi Lines to Barcelona and Tangier
- Moby Lines to Olbia and Bastia
- Toremar to Capraia

=== Trains ===
The city is served by Livorno Centrale station.

== Education ==
=== Schools ===
==== Istituto Tecnico Industriale "Galileo Galilei" ====
The Industrial Technical Institute named to Galileo Galilei was founded in 1825 as a School of Arts and Crafts in order to prepare the youngs to a profession in the sector of the mechanic industry as in the decorative arts. In 1923 the Gentile Reform transformed the school in an Industrial Technical Institute for mechanics and electrical engineering, and in 1947 was added chemistry. In the following years other specialities were added as physics, electronics, biology, nuclear physics and informatics. The institute is structured with 32 laboratories, 8 special school-rooms, library, film library, gymnasiums and machine-shops.

==== Istituto Nautico "Alfredo Cappellini" ====
The Nautical Institute Alfredo Cappellini was formed on 13 December 1863, with a Royal Law and it was the first Technical Institute in the Province of Livorno. In 1921 it was transferred under the jurisdiction of the Ministry of the Navy then returned to the Ministry of Education. The school give the professional preparation to form the Merchant navy Officers.

==== Liceo Classico "Niccolini Palli" ====
The Liceo Classico Niccolini was established on 10 March 1860 by law of Terenzio Mamiani, then Ministry of the Public Instruction. The first Preside elected was Luigi De Steffani who remained in charge from 1862 to 1867. The Liceo was entitled to Giovanni Battista Niccolini, Ugo Foscolo's friend, in 1862; in 1883 it was named to Francesco Domenico Guerrazzi; the name came into effect in 1889 and remained until the unification of the Liceo with the Istituto magistrale. The most famous professor was Giovanni Pascoli who taught Greek and Latin from 1887 to 1895. Among the pupils were Pietro Mascagni, Guglielmo Marconi, Amedeo Modigliani, Giosuè Borsi and Carlo Azeglio Ciampi, who was teacher in 1945.

=== Library ===
==== Biblioteca Labronica ====
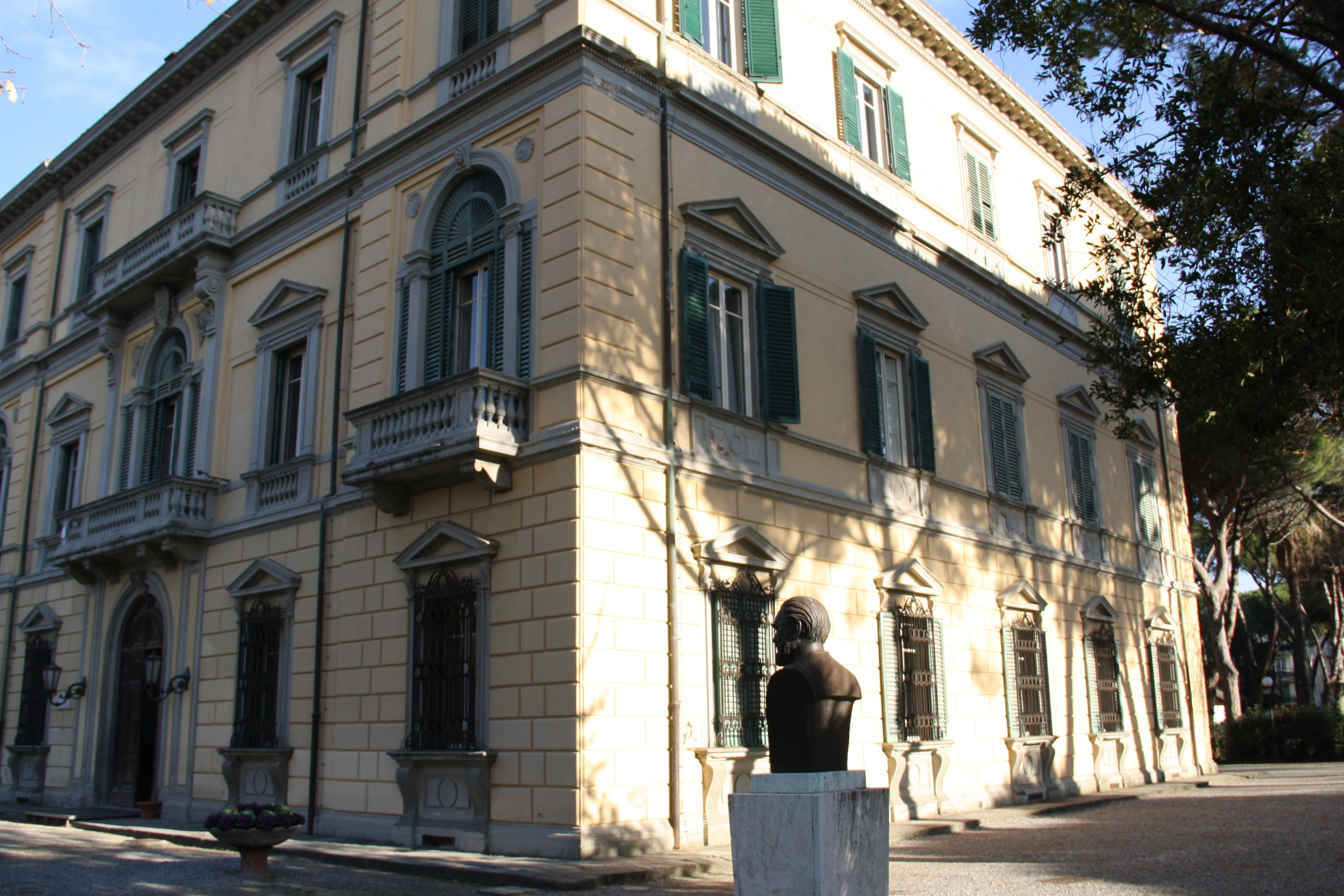
Biblioteca Labronica F.D. Guerrazzi

The Biblioteca Labronica on the Viale della Libertà was founded in 1816, by the fellows of the Accademia Labronica, which was made public in 1840 and it was given to the Comune in 1854. The civic library was dedicated to Francesco Domenico Guerrazzi in 1923 and take place in Villa Fabbricotti. According to the tradition, the origin of the villa date back to the Medicean period when an edifice was built as a suburban residence for Ferdinando II de' Medici. Villa Fabbricotti received the name from its last owner Bernardo Fabbricotti from Carrara, who acquired it from the English merchant Thomas Lloyd in 1881. Fabbricotti, following to adverse economic affairs, sold the Villa and the park to the Comune in 1936. During World War II the building was used by the German command as headquarters, and later taken by the American forces; in the post-war period was restored in order to adapt it into library. In the warehouse of the Biblioteca Labronica are stored: 120,000 books, 1,500 manuscripts, 117 incunables, 2,000 cinquecentine (is a book printed in the 16th century) and 60,000 autographs; the library is organized with reading rooms with 80 places of capacity, 18 seats for consultation of manuscripts, 4 internet positions and a conference room with 60 seats. The library has a collection of autographs including those of Galileo Galilei and Giacomo Leopardi, manuscripts by Ugo Foscolo, and ancient books printed in Livorno since the 17th century, including the Encyclopédie printed in 1770 in Livorno by the ancient Bagno dei forzati (Gaol of the convicts).

== Sport ==
- U.S. Livorno 1915, a semi-professional football club, currently plays in the Serie C. Its matches are played at the Stadio Armando Picchi.
- Pallacanestro Don Bosco Livorno, founded in 1996, is an amateur basketball club, playing in the Serie C Gold as of April 2017.

Livorno also has its own rugby and American football teams.

== Media ==
Il Tirreno

Il Tirreno is a regional newspaper, printed and published in Livorno and distributed in Tuscany. Il Tirreno also features sixteen local editions around the whole region.

Il Vernacoliere

Il Vernacoliere is a satirical monthly magazine printed in Livorno founded in 1982 and distributed in central Italy.

== Notable people ==
- Luca Agamennoni (born 1980), rower
- Andrea Aghini (born 1963), retired rally driver
- Romano Albani (born 1945), cinematographer
- Massimiliano Allegri (born 1967), former football player, football coach
- Mario Ancona (1860–1931), Jewish opera baritone
- Domenico Angelo (1716–1802), fencing master, author
- Federigo Luigi Appelius (1835–1876), naturalist
- Chaim Joseph David Azulai (1724–1807), prolific Rabbinic scholar
- Angiolo Badaloni (1849–1920), engineer
- Baldo Baldi (1888–1961), fencer
- Andrea Baldini (born 1985), fencer, World Champion
- David Balleri (born 1969), footballer
- Giovanni Bartolena (1866–1942), painter
- Enzo Bartolini (1914–1998), rower
- Piero Barontini (1919–2003), painter
- Pietro Bastogi (1808-1899), politician and banker
- Leonardo Bellandi (born 2000), Italian footballer
- Rabbi Elijah Benamozegh (1823–1900), rabbi and scholar of Kabbalah
- Malachi ben Jacob
- Bino Bini
- Lidia Biondi, actress
- Giotto Bizzarrini
- Bernardetto Borromei (?–1610), first Gonfaloniere
- Ranieri de' Calzabigi
- Giuseppe Cambini
- Leonetto Cappiello (1875–1942), painter
- Federico Caprilli (1868–1946), cavalry officer, equestrian
- Giorgio Caproni (1912–1990), poet
- Fortunato Cassone (1828–1889), commander of Regia Accademia Navale
- David Castelli (1836–1901), Jewish Biblical scholar
- Diacinto Cestoni (1637–1718), naturalist
- Mario Checcacci
- Pierluigi Chicca
- Giorgio Chiellini (born 1984), football player
- Carlo Azeglio Ciampi (1920–2016), former President of the Republic of Italy
- Piero Ciampi (1934–1980), musician
- Costanzo Ciano
- Gian Galeazzo Ciano (1903–1944), Italian Minister of Foreign Affairs and Benito Mussolini's son-in-law
- Arduíno Colassanti
- Antonio Corazzi
- Vittorio Matteo Corcos (1859–1933), painter
- Moses Cordovero, leading scholar and Kabbalist
- Giovanni de Gamerra
- Serafino De Tivoli
- Pio Alberto Del Corona (1837–1912), bishop
- Paolo Emilio Demi (1798–1863), sculptor
- Manlio Di Rosa
- Marco Di Viesti, football player
- Dino Diluca
- Giulio Dolci (1883–1965), literate
- Federigo Enriques
- Paolo Enriques (1878–1932), zoologist (genetics)
- Giovanni Fattori (1825–1908), painter
- Bruno Filippi
- Giorgio Fontanelli (1925–1993), professor, poet, essayist
- Voltolino Fontani (1920–1976), painter
- Anna Franchi (1867-1954), novelist, playwright
- Alberto Fremura (born 1936), artist
- Angelo Froglia (1955–1997), painter and creator of the scandal of the heads of Modigliani
- Vivi Gioi (1914–1975) actress
- Filippo Gragnani (1768–1820), virtuoso guitarist and composer
- Gino Graziani (1893–1976) President of the Chamber of Commerce of Livorno during the reconstruction after the Second World War, Industrialist
- Oreste Grossi
- Francesco Domenico Guerrazzi (1804–1873), writer and politician
- Marzio Innocenti, former captain of Italy national rugby union team
- Abraham Khalfon (1741–1819), Tripoli Jewish community leader, historian, and scholar
- Aurelio Lampredi
- Dario Lari
- Gio Batta Lepori (1911–2002), painter
- Francis Levett, English merchant, the Levant Company
- Augusto Liverani (1858–1929), educator
- Llewelyn Lloyd (1879–1949), painter
- Alessandro Lucarelli (born 1977), football player
- Cristiano Lucarelli (born 1975), football player, top scorer of Serie A in 2004–05
- Mario Magnozzi
- Vincenzo Malenchini (1813–1881), lawyer, patriot
- Giovanni Marradi (1852–1922) poet, writer, patriot and politician
- Pietro Mascagni (1863–1945), opera composer
- Davide Matteini
- Matteo Mazzantini (born 1976), rugby player
- Luca Mazzoni
- Enrico Mayer (1802–1877), pedagogist, writer
- Umberto Melnati
- Guido Menasci
- Carlo Meyer (1837–1897), engineer, patriot
- Amedeo Modigliani (1884–1920), Painter and sculptor, famous for the paintings of long-necked women
- Aldo Montano (born 1978), fencer, Olympic gold medalist
- Moses Haim Montefiore (1784–1885), Jewish financier and philanthropist in Britain
- Rabbi Sabato Morais (1823–1897), rabbi in Philadelphia, USA, and founder of the Jewish Theological Seminary of America in New York City
- Fabrizio Mori
- Alfredo Muller (1869–1940), artist
- Aldo Nadi
- Nedo Nadi (1894–1940), won 5 gold medals in fencing at the 1920 Olympics
- Renato Natali (1883–1979) Painter, heir to the Macchiaioli and Impressionists, founder of the Grppo Labronico
- Alessandro Neri (1820–1896), patriot
- Adriano Novi Lena (1840–1888), lawyer, Member of Parliament
- Angeliki Palli, writer
- Giorgio Pellini
- Armando Picchi (1935–1971), football player and manager
- Enrico Pollastrini
- Oreste Puliti
- Ottorino Quaglierini
- Giulia Quintavalle
- Dario Resta (1884–1924), race car driver, Indy 500 winner
- Rolando Rigoli
- Eugenio Sansoni (1828–1906), first mayor from 1865 to 1867
- Giovanni Schmidt
- Dante Secchi
- Percy Bysshe Shelley
- Hezekiah da Silva
- Mauro Simonetti
- Mauro Sordi (1916–1989), biologist, director of Livorno Aquarium
- Athos Tanzini
- Giovanni Targioni-Tozzetti
- Giuseppe Maria Terreni (1739–1811), painter
- Rabbi Elio Toaff (1915–2015), Chief rabbi of Rome
- Ilaria Tocchini
- Angiolo Tommasi (1858–1923), artist
- Dino Urbani
- Samuel Uziel (17th century), rabbi and Talmudist
- Antonio Vinciguerra (born 1937), sculptor, painter, designer
- Paolo Virzì (born 1964), film screenwriter and director
- Filippo Volandri, tennis player

== International relations ==
=== Twin towns – sister cities ===
Livorno is twinned with:

- Bat Yam, Israel
- Guadalajara, Spain
- Haiphong, Vietnam
- Novorossiysk, Russia
- (United States) Oakland, U.S.

== Gallery ==
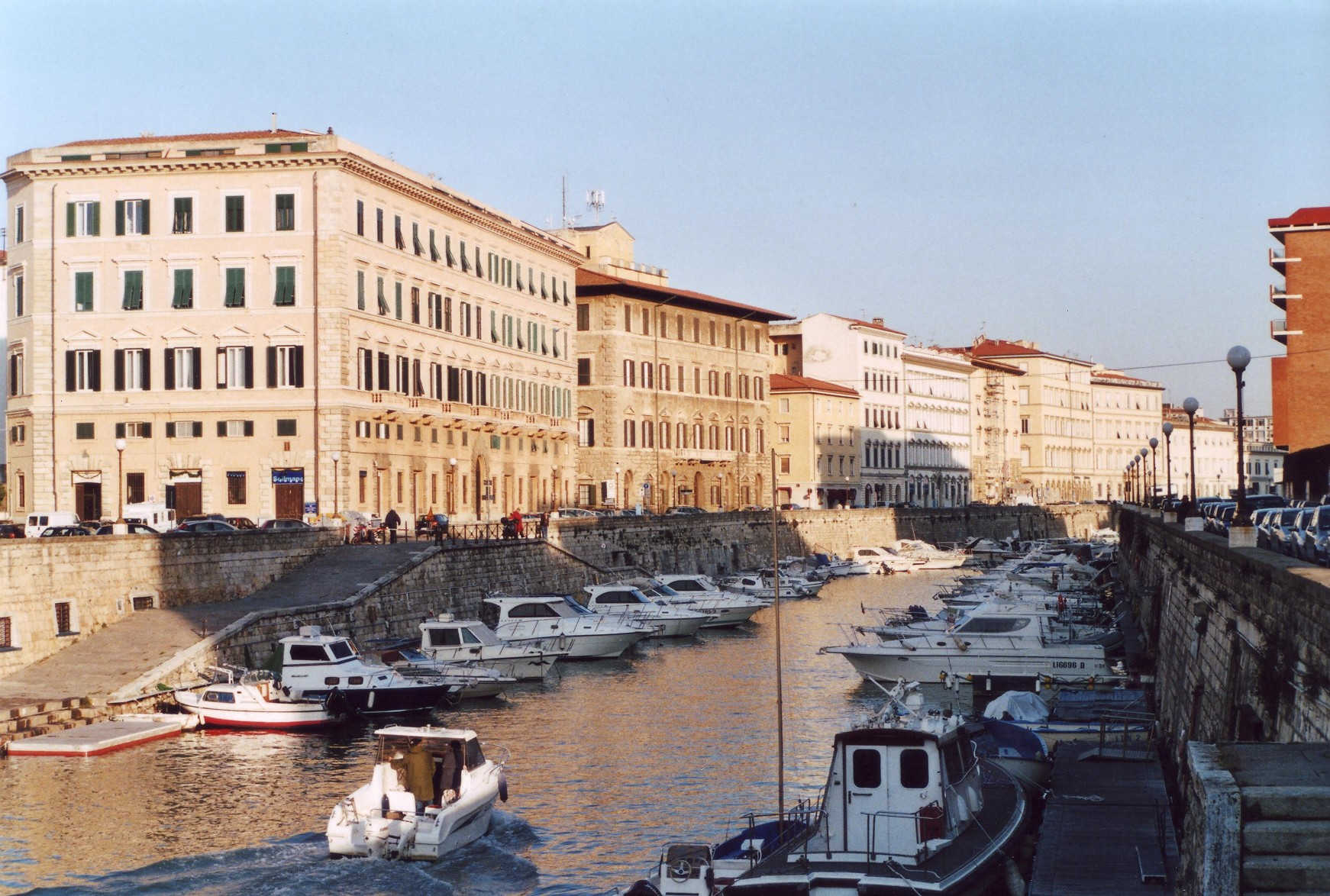
Fosso Reale

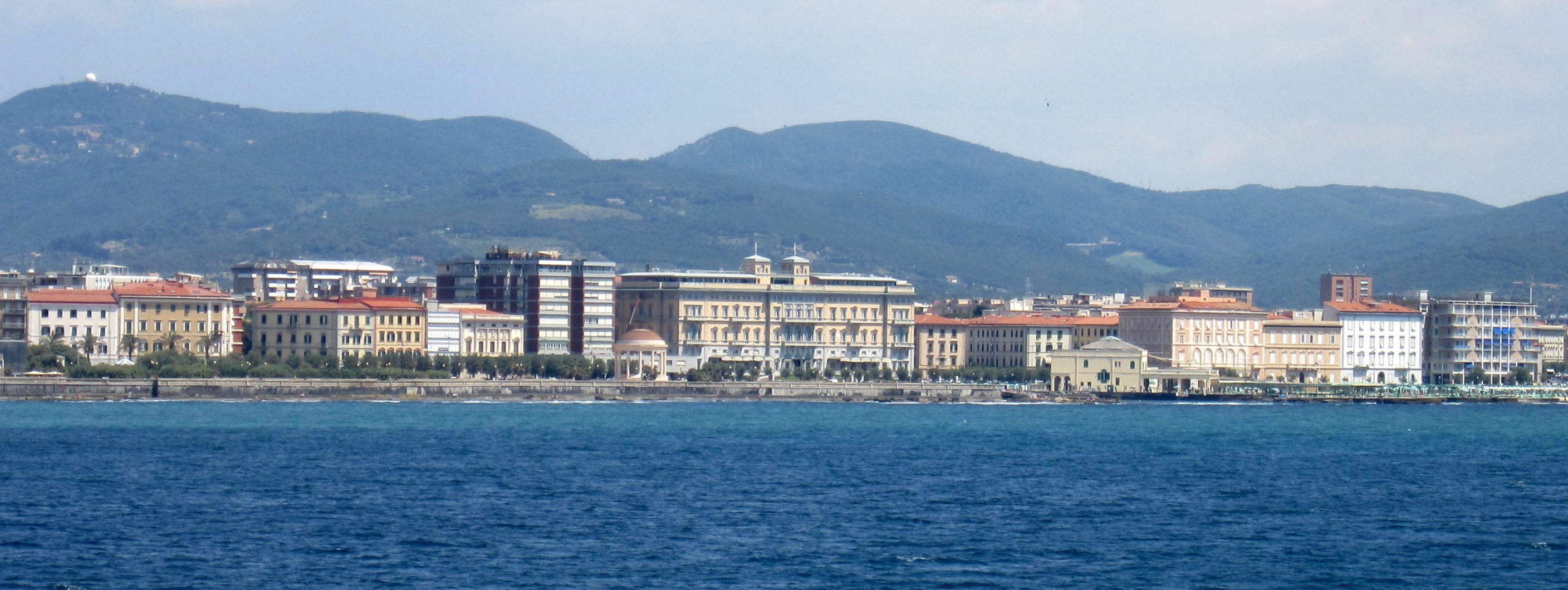
View of the western part of Livorno

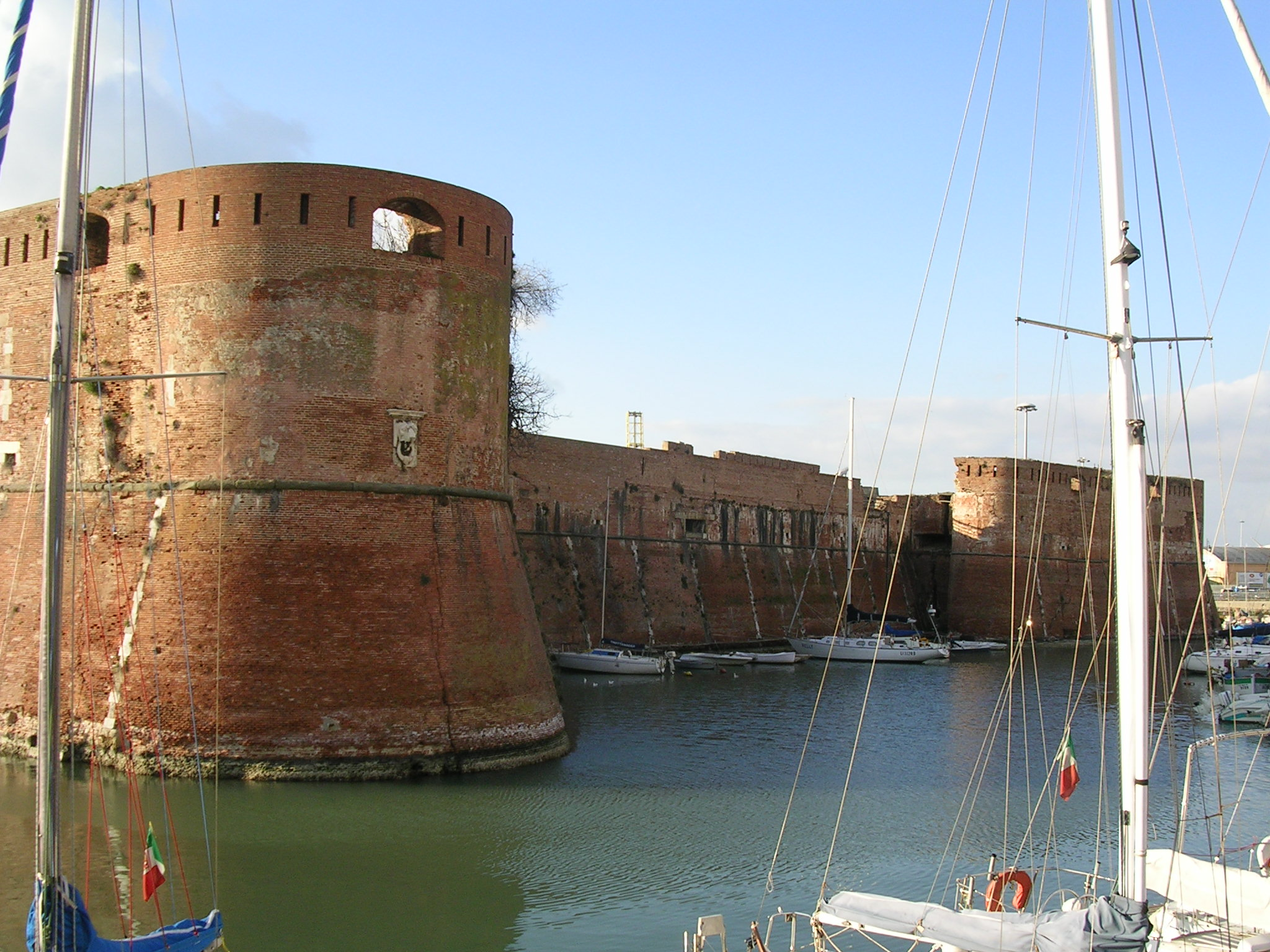
Old Fortress

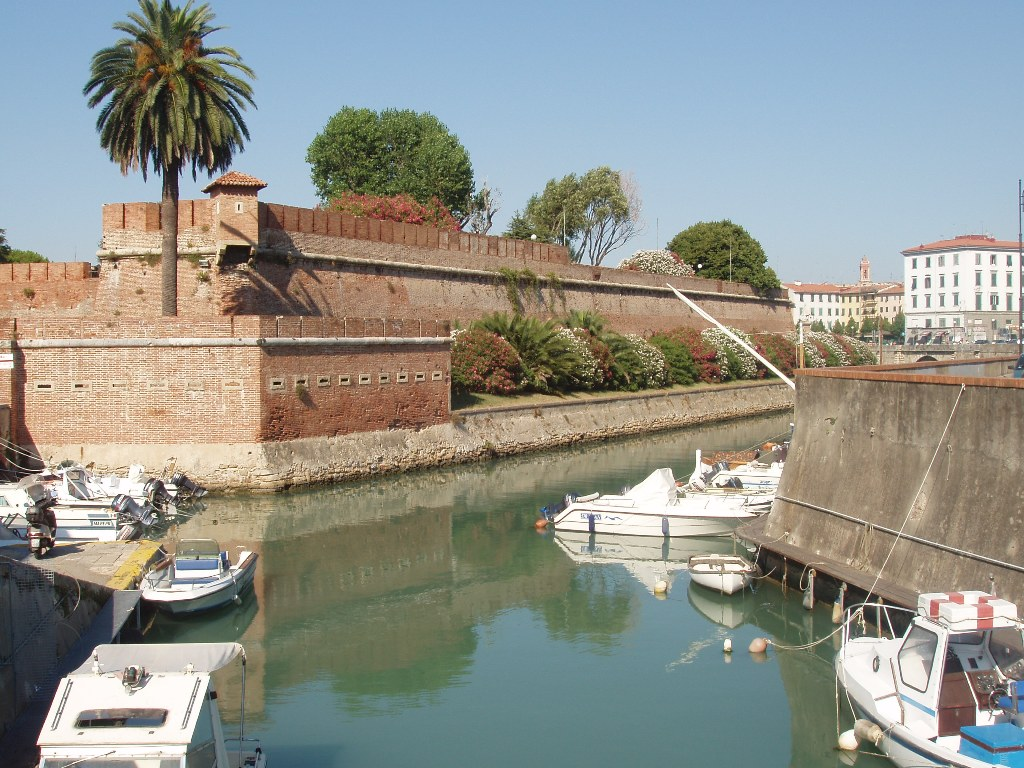
New Fortress

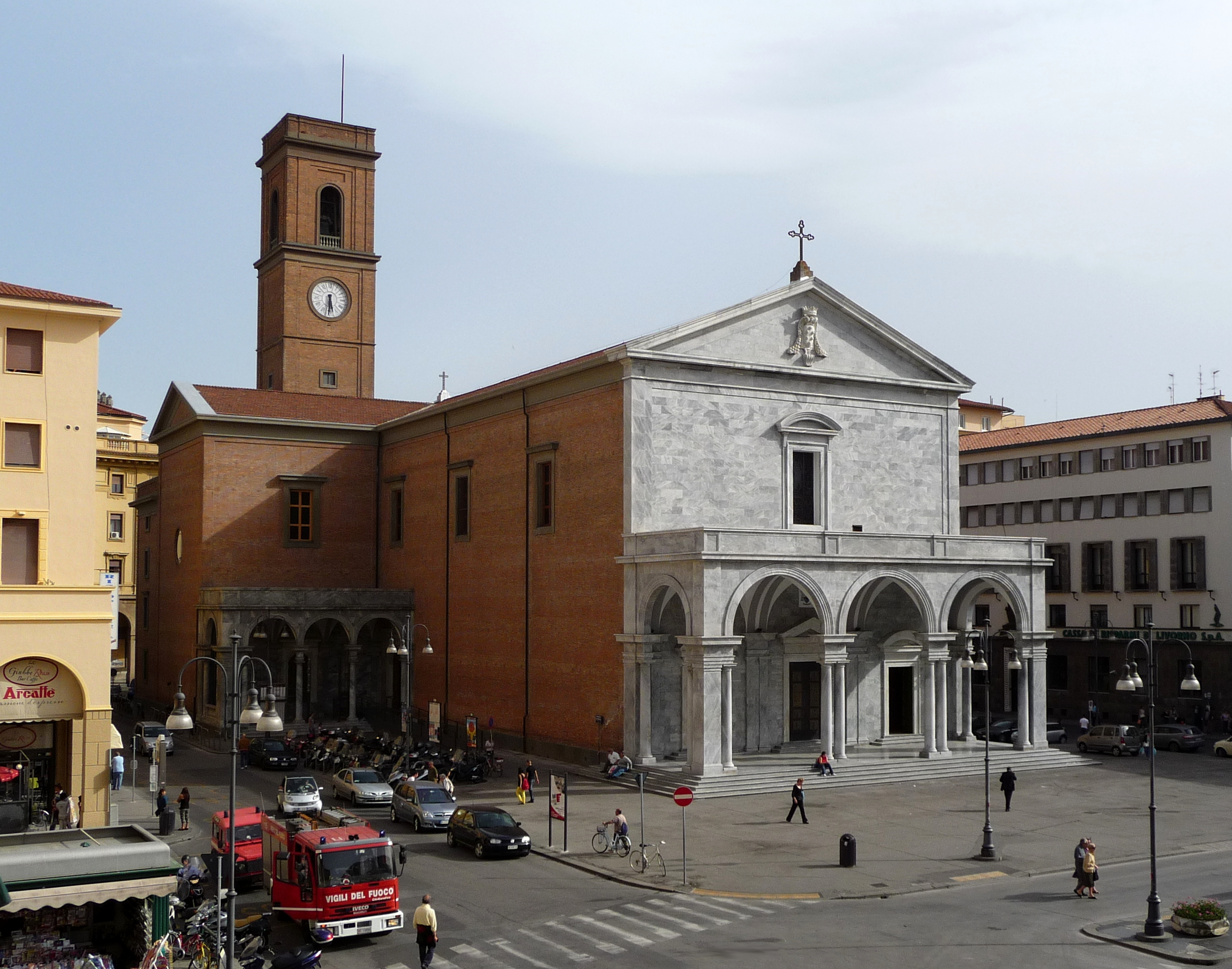
Duomo of Livorno

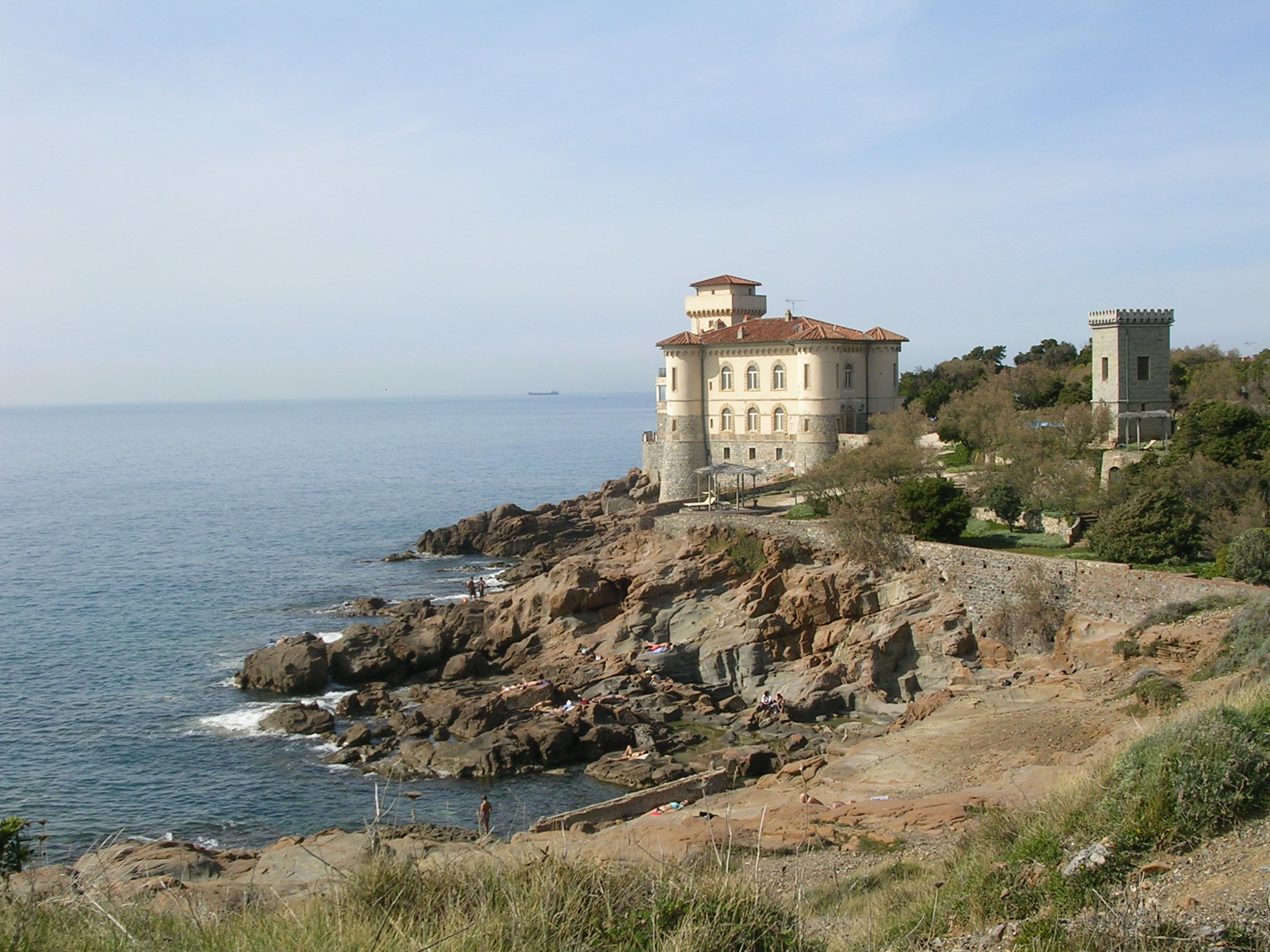
The Boccale Castle

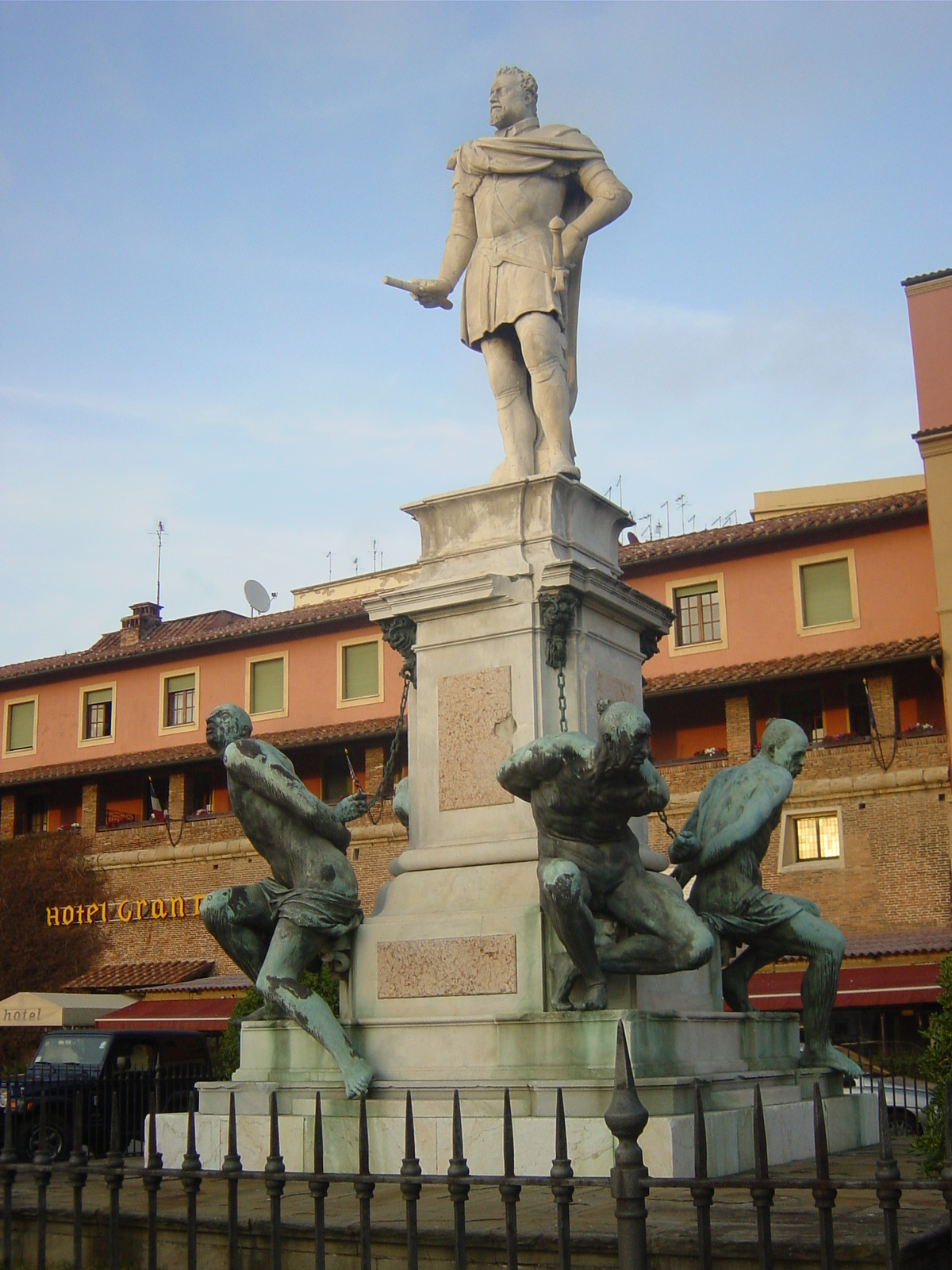
Monumento dei Quattro Mori

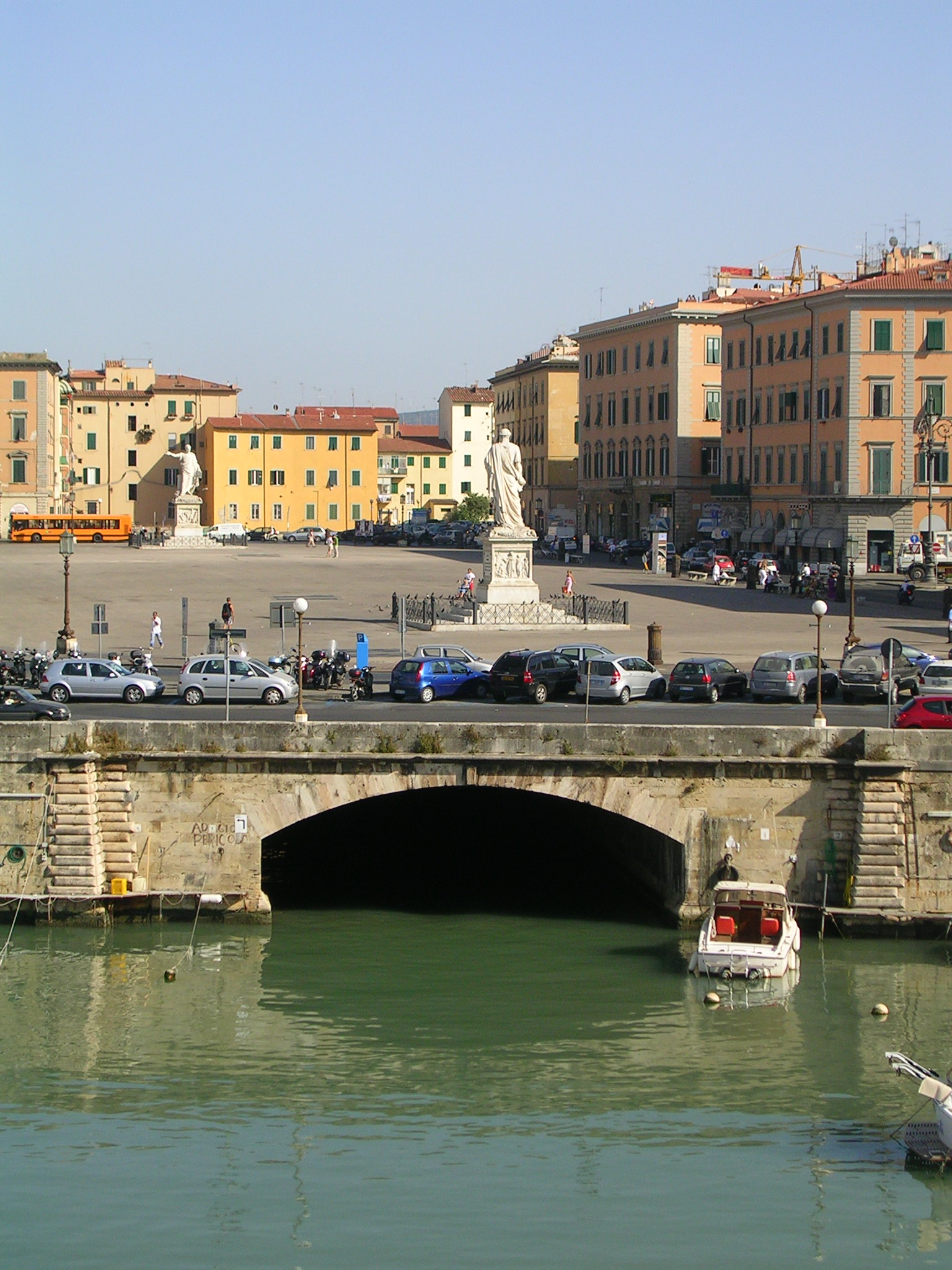
Piazza della Repubblica

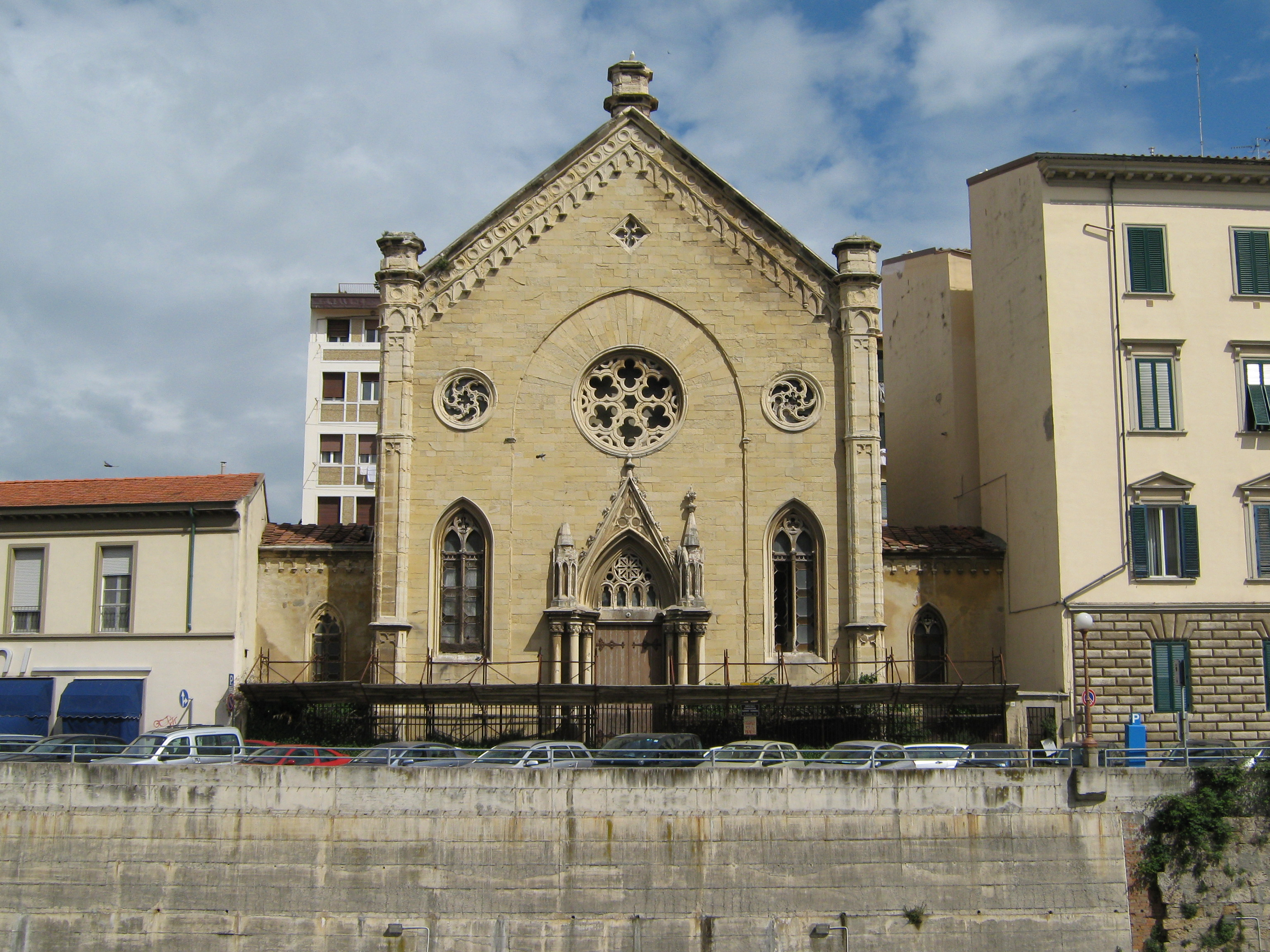
Temple of the Dutch German Congregation

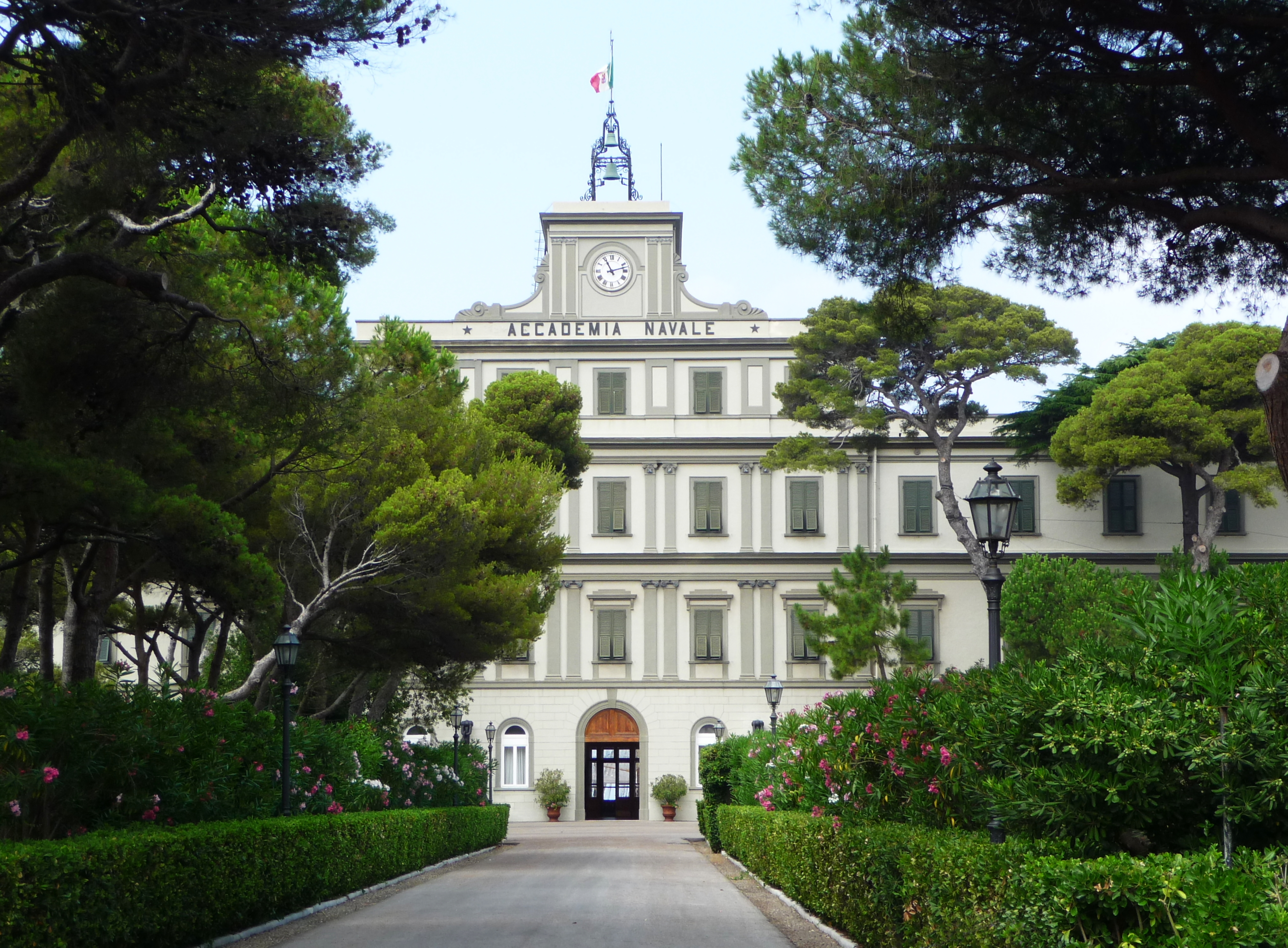
The Italian Naval Academy

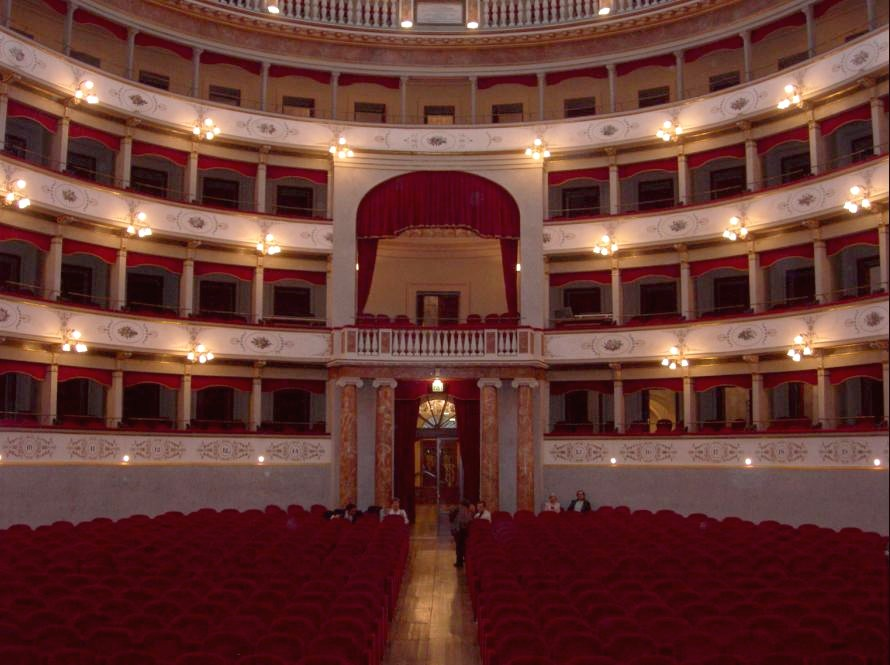
The Goldoni Theatre

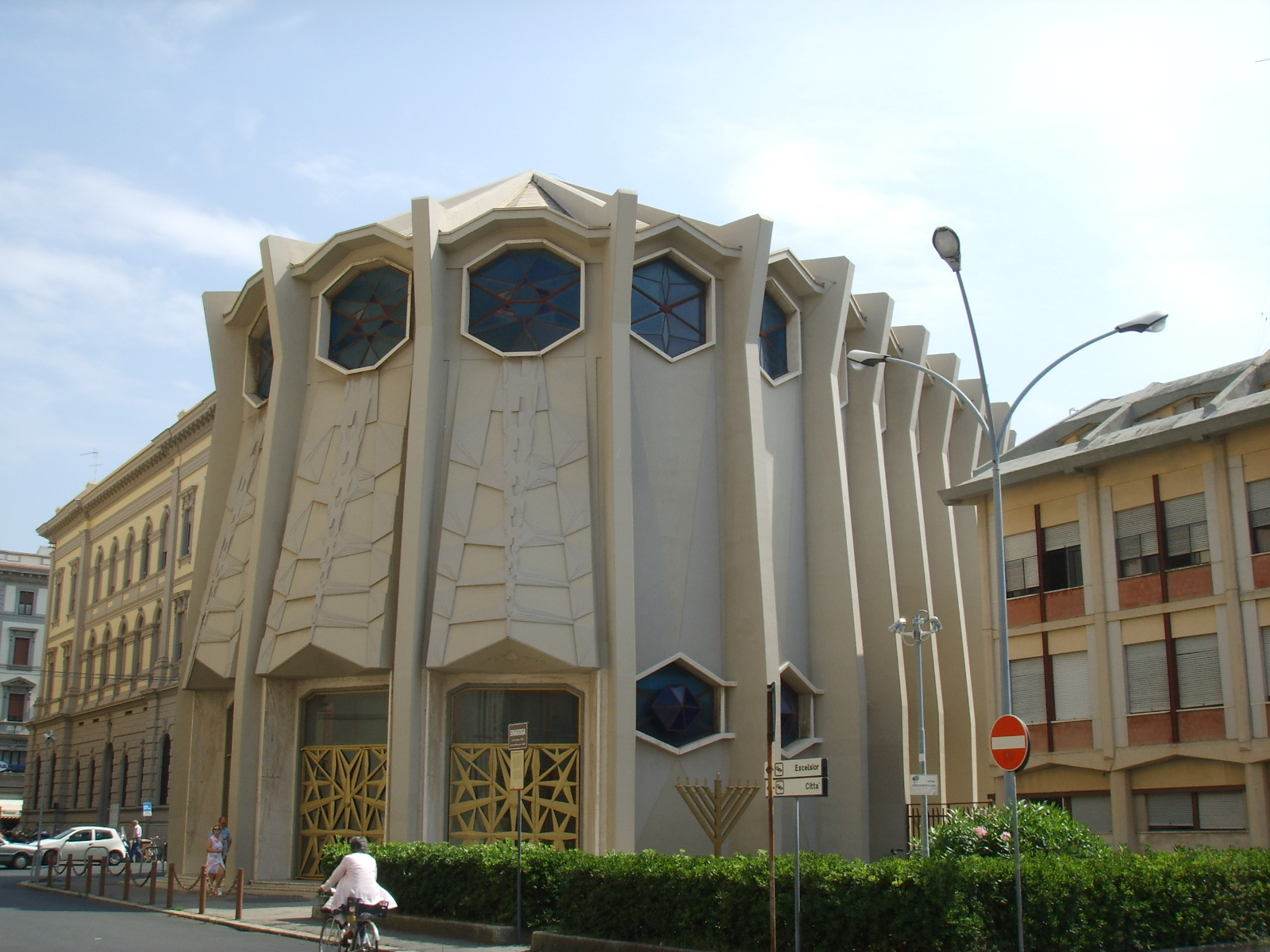
Livorno's synagogue

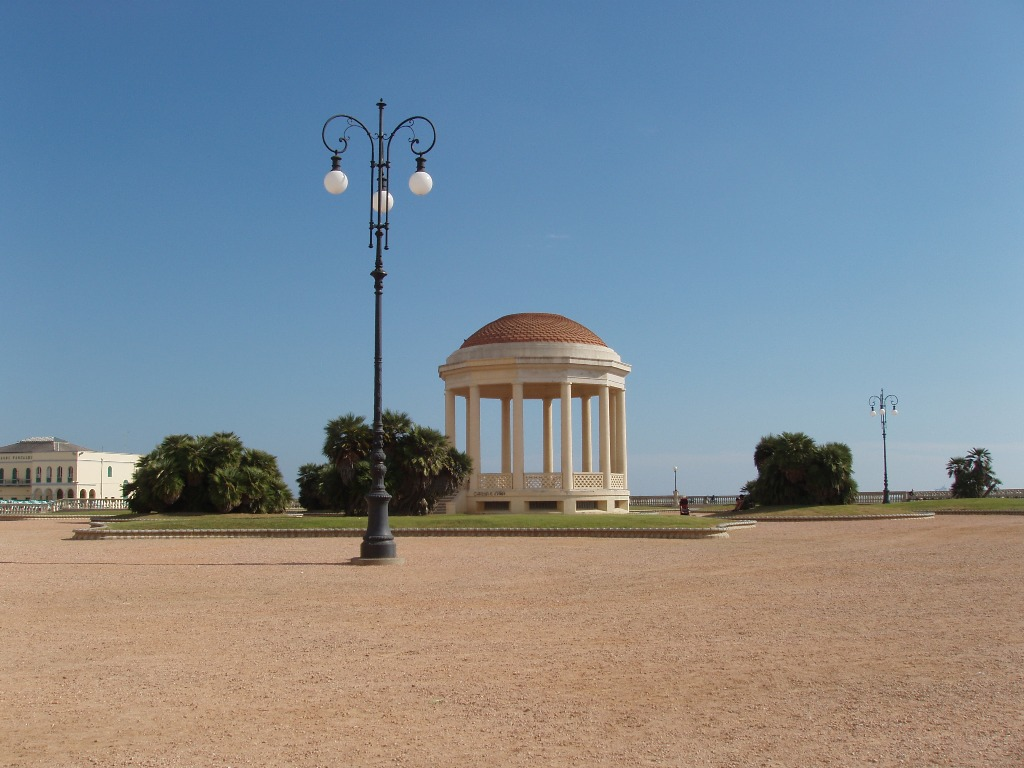
The Terrazza Mascagni

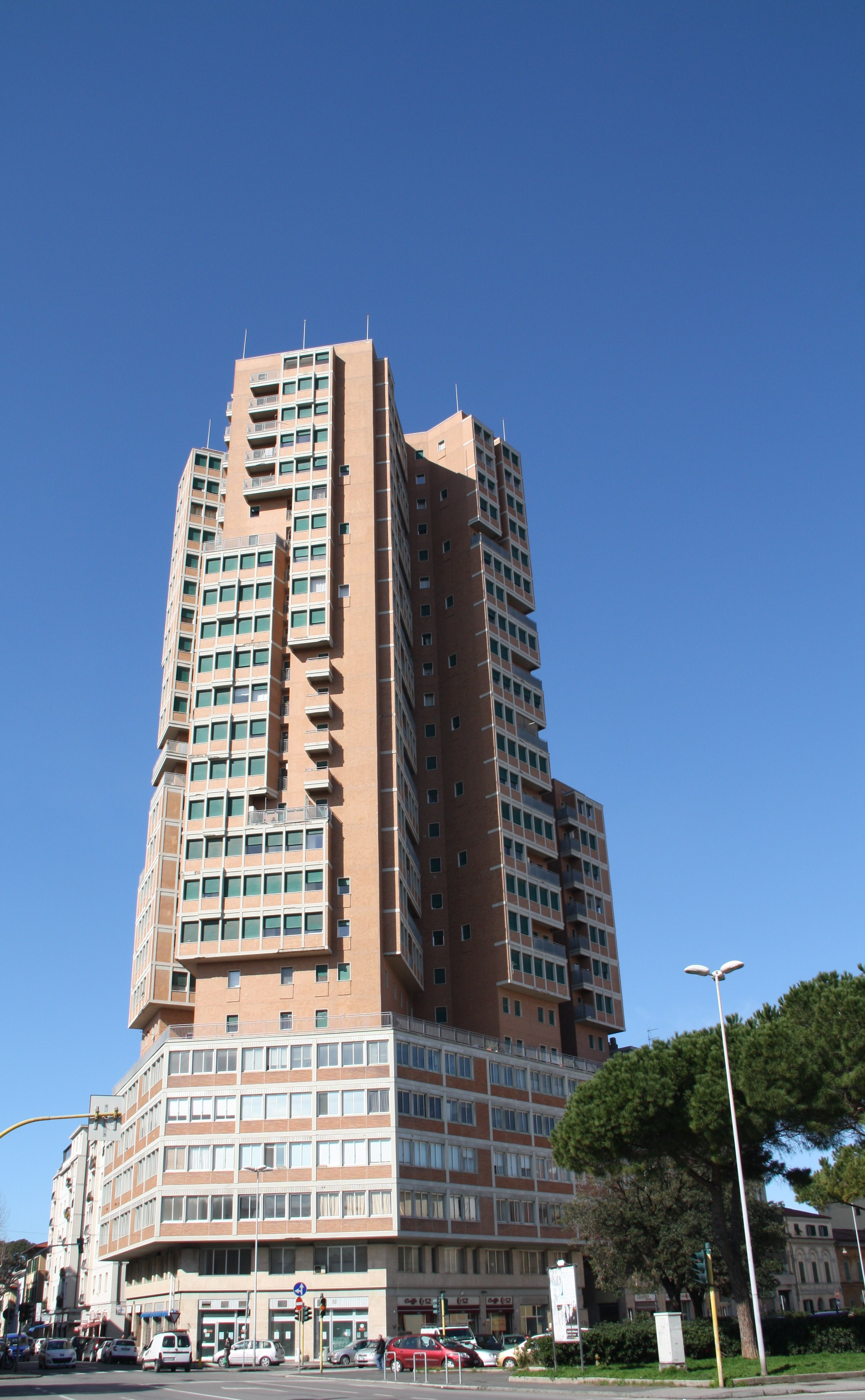
Grattacielo

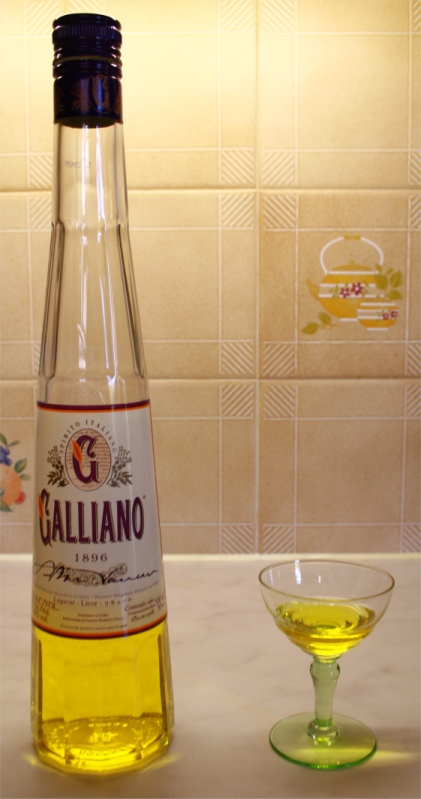
Galliano liqueur from Livorno

== See also ==
- Azienda Trasporti Livornese
- Battle of Leghorn
- History of the Jews in Livorno
- Livorno Hills
- Port of Livorno
