= Bombing of Livorno in World War II =

Bombing of Livorno
- Part of World War II
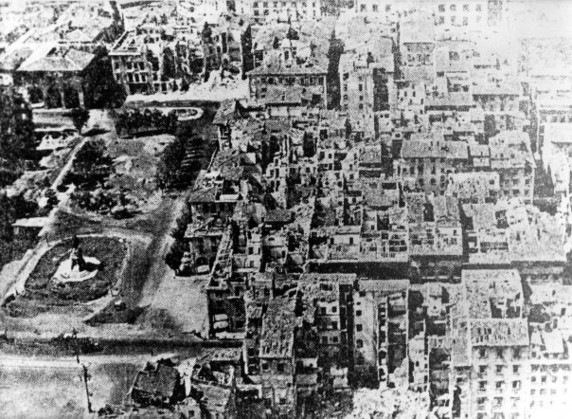
- Destruction in Livorno's city centre
Date	1940-1944
Location	Livorno, Italy

Belligerents
United Kingdom; United States	Kingdom of Italy (1940-1943); Italian Social Republic (1943-1944)

During World War II, the Italian port city of Livorno, Tuscany, was repeatedly bombed by the Allied air forces, suffering about a hundred raids altogether, which resulted in it being among the most war-damaged cities in Italy.

== Background ==
Livorno, the main port of Tuscany, was considered by the Allies to be of strategic importance owing to its harbour facilities (the harbour of Livorno was one of the main ports of the Italian Tyrrhenian coast north of Rome), its marshalling yards, its shipyard (which built destroyers and corvettes for the Italian Navy), its oil refinery and other factories engaged in war production, such as the Motofides torpedo factory.

== Air raids ==
The first air raid on Livorno took place at 2:30 on 16 June 1940, six days after Italy's entrance into the war, when some French Amiot 143 medium bombers dropped a few bombs in the Venezia Nuova district, causing light damage. Another minor raid by the Armée de l'Air took place two days before the Armistice of Villa Incisa, at 4:45 on 22 June, when a few naval aircraft hit and badly damaged a hotel and a beach resort. This raid was also notable because the approaching French aircraft were detected by an Italian radar prototype.

After the surrender of France, Livorno enjoyed a period of relative calm until 9 February 1941, when eighteen Fairey Swordfish aircraft of the Fleet Air Arm, flown from the carrier HMS Ark Royal during Operation Grog, bombed the ANIC oil refinery.

The rest of 1941, 1942 and early 1943 passed without incident, as Livorno was outside the range of both RAF Bomber Command aircraft that from England attacked the cities of Northwestern Italy, and Malta-based RAF bombers that attacked the cities of Southern Italy. The situation changed with the Allied conquest of French North Africa and the end of the Tunisian campaign; USAAF bombers, taking off from airfields in Tunisia, were now able to hit Livorno as well.

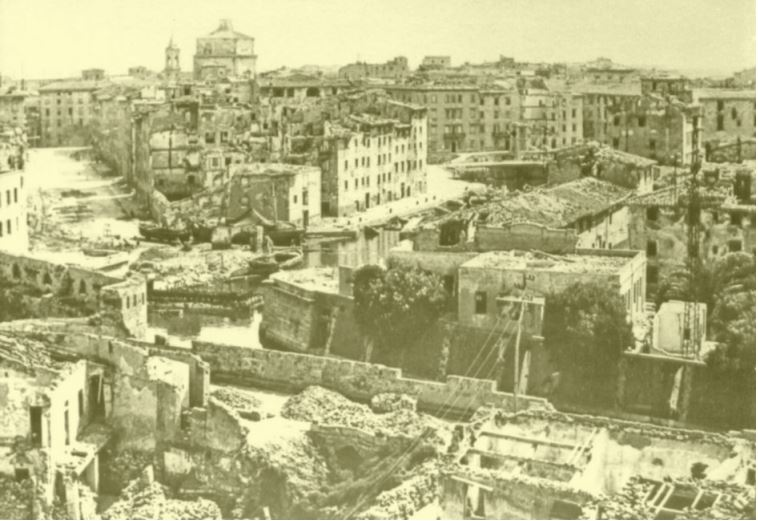
Damage caused by the air raids in the Venezia Nuova district

The first raid on Livorno by the USAAF took place on 28 May 1943, when a hundred Boeing B-17 Flying Fortress bombers of the 12th Air Force took off from bases in North Africa and attacked the harbour, the oil refinery and the marshalling yard. The objectives were hit (the maritime station was destroyed), but a large part of the bombs (roughly 180 tons) fell on the city, causing widespread damage, especially in the city centre and the Venezia Nuova district; 170 buildings were destroyed, including the cathedral, the Synagogue, the market hall and the Verdi and Rossini theatres, 300 were badly damaged and 1,300 lightly damaged, with the death of 249 civilians (other sources claim that the dead were about three hundred, with a thousand wounded). A bomb hit Villa Baciocchi, used as an orphanage for little girls, killing forty little girls and nuns; dozens of people were killed when the improvised air raid shelters created in the cellars of the Livornese Rowing Association were hit and collapsed. Several ships were sunk in the harbour, including the torpedo boats Angelo Bassini and Antares, the corvette FR 52, the steamer Tiziano and the auxiliary cruiser Caralis, which was loaded with ammunition and blew up, causing further damage to the harbour and to other ships. Some 20,000 people abandoned the city in the following days; the town of Rosignano, for instance, was swarmed with 8,000 refugees in one day, forcing local authorities to requisition the schools and every vacant building to house them.

A second, identical raid by 97 B-17 bombers of the 12th Air Force, targeting the same objectives, took place exactly a month later, and had identical results; about 250 tons of bombs were dropped, hitting both the objectives (the industrial area and the central station were badly damaged) and the city, causing widespread destruction and killing another 252 people. Eighty-six people died in an air raid shelter, hit by a bomb. The old light cruiser Bari was sunk in the harbour. These two raids were the most devastating attacks suffered by Livorno during the entire war.

On 24 July 1943 thirty-three RAF bombers, during a shuttle bombing mission from the United Kingdom to Algeria, dropped 83 tons of bombs against Livorno's power plant, but the bombs fell on the city, especially the San Marco district, destroying 165 buildings, causing heavy damage to another 550 and killing 44 people. This raid also damaged the Italian Naval Academy and prompted its relocation to Venice, outside the operational range of Allied bombers.

The proclamation of the Armistice of Cassibile, on 8 September 1943, was followed two days later by German occupation. On 21 September thirty-two bombers of the 12th Air Force bombed the harbour, causing heavy damage to its facilities, and in the night of 24 September this attack was repeated by eighty bombers of the Royal Air Force. On 30 October the German command declared most of the city (the historical centre, the industrial area, the area surrounding the Naval Academy, and some other parts of the city) "Black Zone", and ordered its evacuation; the inhabitants were given ten days to leave with their belongings. After the expiry of this date, trespassers would be shot on sight. People residing outside of the "Black Zone" were also advised to leave, and most did, leaving the city almost deserted. The municipal authority, whose seat (Palazzo Comunale) had been badly damaged, was relocated to the hill frazione of Montenero.

Further raids, targeting the harbour, took place on 24, 25, 29 and 30 March 1944 and 1 April 1944, all by the USAAF; on 2 April thirteen RAF bombers attacked again the harbour, whereas on 14 April the USAAF bombed the marshalling yard, followed that night by 24 RAF bombers that attacked the harbour. On 15 April 1944 U.S. bombers attacked the marshalling yard, and on the following day five RAF bombers bombed the harbour; on 19 April twenty-three British bombers attacked the harbour, and 24 RAF bombers did the same on 23 April. More raids took place on 29 April (22 RAF bombers), 30 April (six RAF bombers), 1 May (six RAF bombers, targeting the marshalling yard), 2 May (twelve RAF bombers), 9 May (eight RAF bombers), 19 May (USAAF, targeting the harbour), 7, 13 and 21 June (all by USAAF, against the port). The heaviest raids of 1944 were the ones that took place on 19 May and 7 June, hitting again the city centre and destroying the "Black Zone"; there were no casualties thanks to its evacuation a few months before.

== Aftermath ==
On 19 July 1944, Livorno was liberated by the U.S. Fifth Army and by Italian partisans; they found, in the words of historian James Holland, "a ghost town, lying in ruins, pulverised by Allied bombing". Before leaving the city, German engineers blew up the surviving port facilities, the beach resorts, the lighthouse and several bridges and buildings, adding further destruction to the one caused by the air raids. On 29 July, a few Luftwaffe bombers carried out a single raid on Livorno, causing little damage. Altogether, Livorno suffered fifty-six air raids.

After the liberation, local authorities carried out a survey which revealed that 15.78% of all buildings in Livorno had been destroyed, 14.94% had been badly damaged, 26.14% had been lightly damaged, and 43.14% had escaped damage. In the city centre, only 8.38% of all buildings had escaped damage; 33.38% had been completely destroyed, 27.94% badly damaged and 28.30% had been moderately or lightly damaged. Over 30,000 people were left homeless.

Estimates of deaths among the civilian population vary between 700 and 1,300.

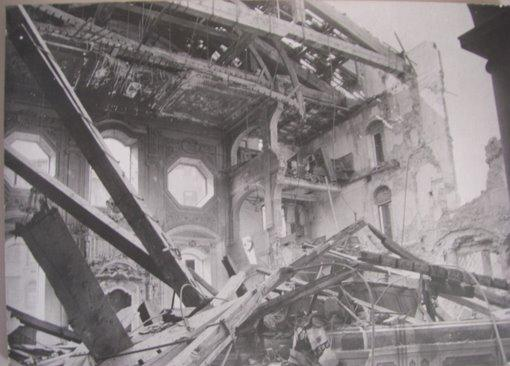
Ruins of the Old Synagogue after a raid

Cultural heritage suffered considerable damage. The Cathedral of Saint Francis of Assisi was destroyed, but rebuilt as it was after the war; the ancient churches of Santa Barbara and San Gregorio Illuminatore (used by the Armenian community of Livorno) were destroyed and never rebuilt, whereas the Greek church of Santissima Annunziata and the historic Palazzo Comunale and Palazzo Granducale were also largely destroyed but were restored after the war. Both the Fortezza Vecchia and the Fortezza Nuova were badly damaged; most of the historic palaces located along the Via Grande, Livorno's decuman, were badly damaged or destroyed, and the 19th century Dogana d'acqua (port customs) was reduced to ruins. Three of the city's four major theatres, built between the 18th and the 19th century, were destroyed or badly damaged and never rebuilt. The old Synagogue, the second largest synagogue in Europe, was partially destroyed and never rebuilt, being replaced by a new synagogue after the war. The Venezia Nuova district, built between the 17th and 18th centuries, was largely destroyed, but many of its historic palaces were repaired or rebuilt after the war. The Old English Cemetery also suffered serious damage.

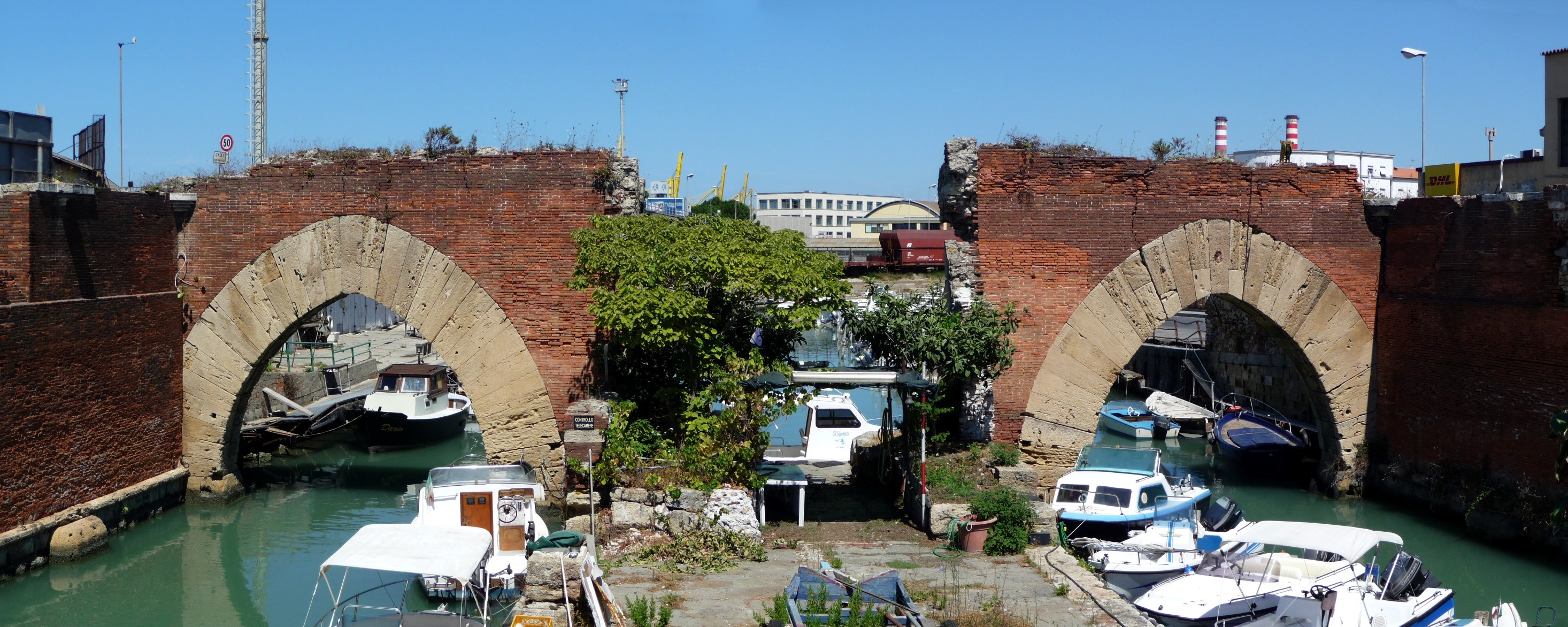
Present-day remains of the Dogana d'acqua

Heavy damage was suffered by the city's industries; most of the Livorno industrial area was destroyed by the air raids, with all major factories – SPICA, Richard Ginori, Motofides, Cementeria Italiana (cement factory), Società Metallurgica Italiana (steel works), Manifatture Riunite (cotton mill), ANIC (oil refinery) – being destroyed or badly damaged, leaving thousands of workers unemployed. The port facilities and the shipyard were destroyed, not only by the air raids but also by the retreating Germans, who destroyed with explosive charges any part that had survived the raids in order to prevent its use by the Allies. Over 130 vessels of all types and sizes, part of them sunk by the air raids and part scuttled as blockships by the Germans, littered the harbour (which was also sown with mines) and blocked its entrances.

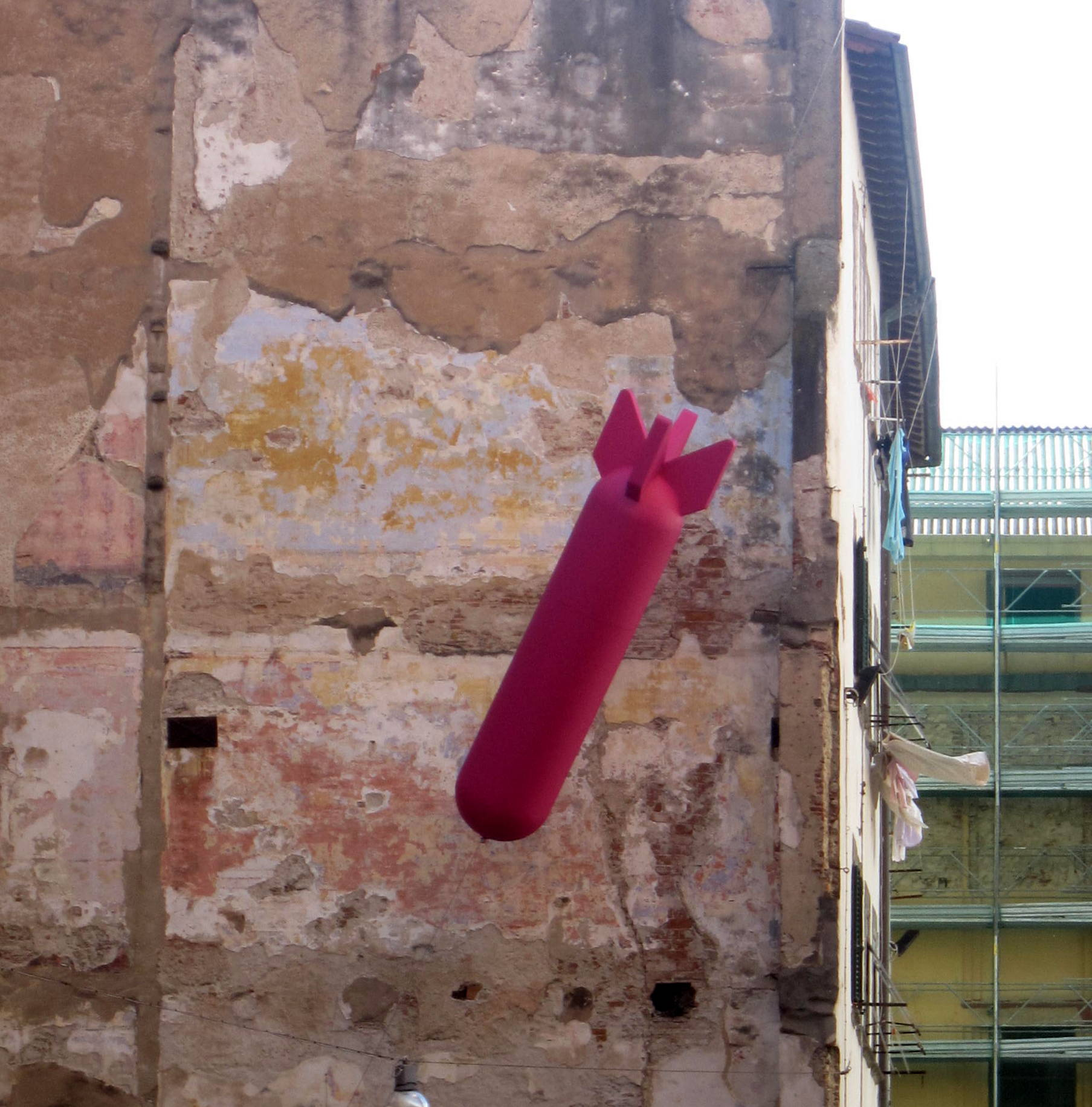
Art installation commemorating the 70th anniversary of the May 1943 bombing of Livorno, next to a bomb-damaged building, in 2013

On 18 October 1944, three months after the liberation, the city council formed a committee for the reconstruction of the city. Postal service resumed on 18 December; in January 1945 the Spedali Riuniti, Livorno's main hospital, started operating again. Between 1945 and 1949 over seventy cooperatives were born, tasked with clearing the rubble, tearing down irreparably damaged buildings, repairing repairable buildings and building new ones.

== Bibliography ==
- Gastone Razzaguta, Livorno Nostra, Nuova Fortezza, Livorno 1980.
- Beppe Leonardini, Giovanni Corozzi, Giovanni Pentagna, Apocalisse 1943/45 distruzione di una città, Nuova Fortezza, Livorno 1984.
- Andrea Melosi, Resistenza, dopoguerra e ricostruzione a Livorno, Nuova Fortezza, Livorno 1984.
- Ivan Tognarini, Livorno nel XX secolo, gli anni cruciali di una città tra fascismo, resistenza e ricostruzione, Polistampa 2006.
- Marco Gioannini, Giulio Massobrio, Bombardate L'italia, storia della guerra di distruzione aerea 1940-1945, Rizzoli Storica, Milano 2007.
