= Fortezza Vecchia =

Fortezza Vecchia may refer to:

- Old Fortress, Corfu
- Old Fortress, Livorno
