= Antonio da Sangallo =

Antonio da Sangallo may refer to:

- Antonio da Sangallo the Elder (c. 1453–1534), Florentine architect
- Antonio da Sangallo the Younger (or Antonio Cordiani), (1484–1546), Florentine architect and the Elder's nephew
