= Santa Maria delle Carceri, Prato =

Basilica church in Prato, Tuscany, Italy

Coordinates: 43°52′45.97″N 11°5′54.42″E

Santa Maria delle Carceri
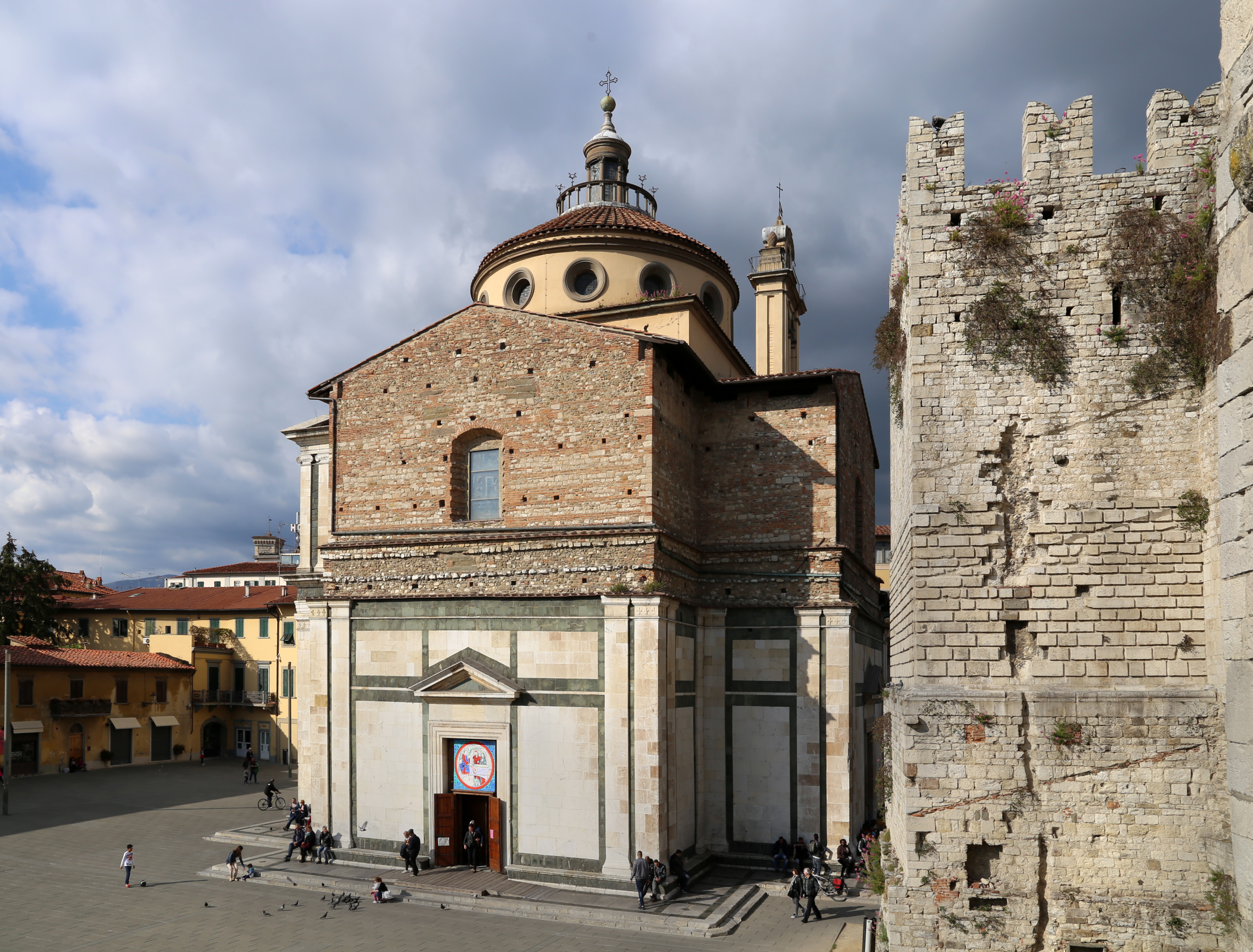
- Front of the church

Religion
- Affiliation: Roman Catholic

Location
- Location: Prato, Italy
- Interactive map of Santa Maria delle Carceri

Architecture
- Type: Church
- Style: Reinassance
- Groundbreaking: 1400 ca.
- Completed: 1516

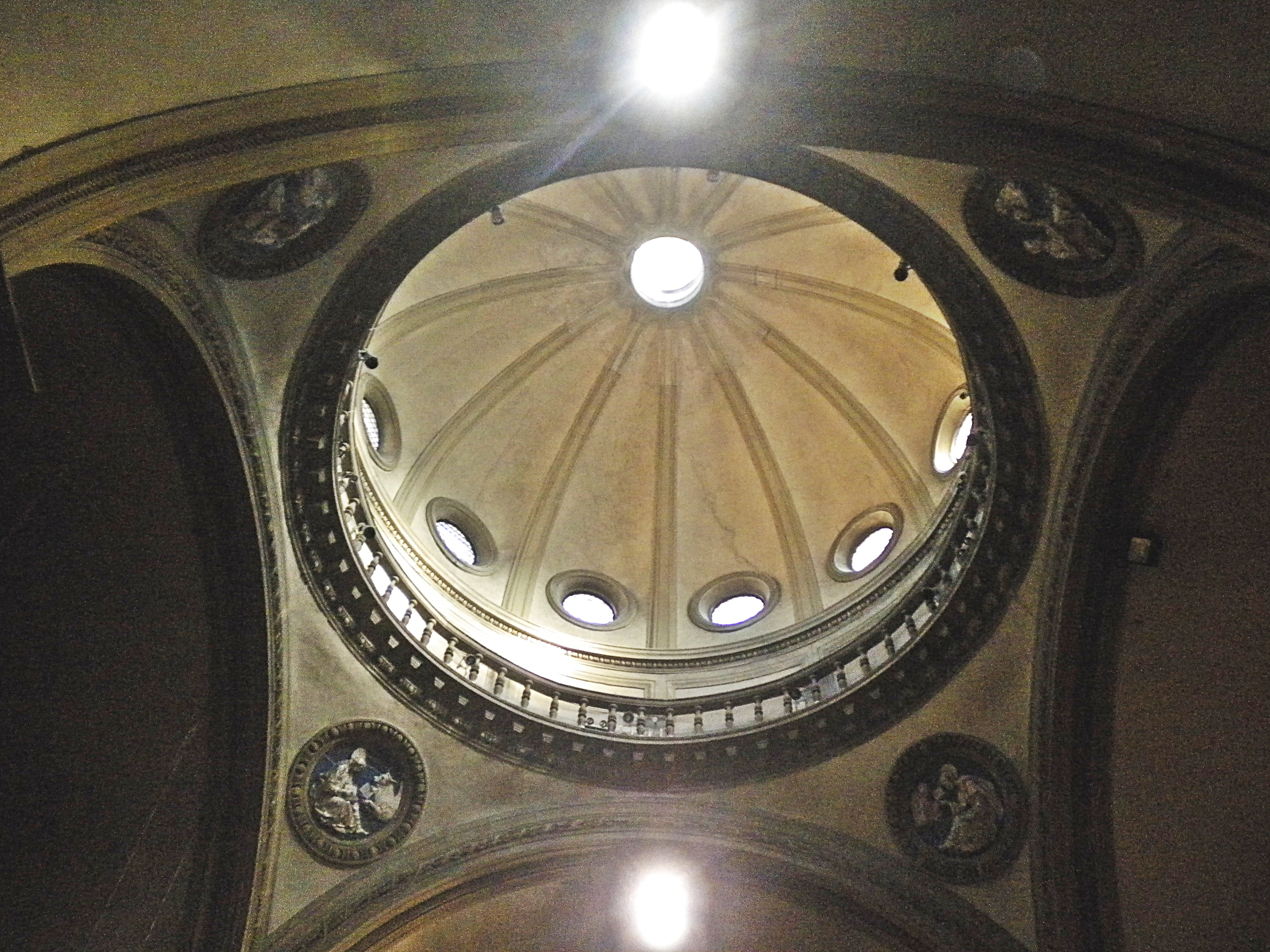
Internal dome

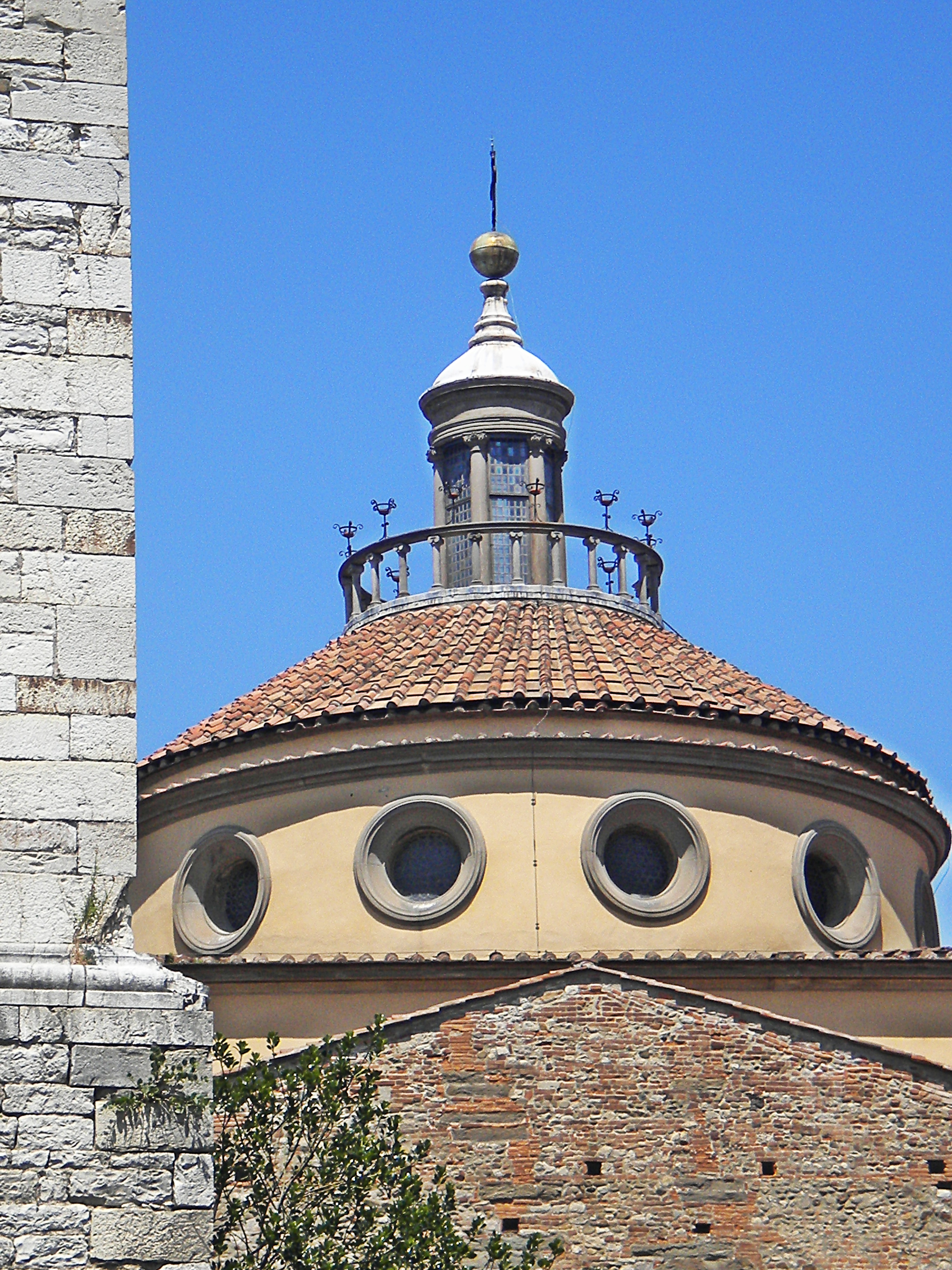
Dome

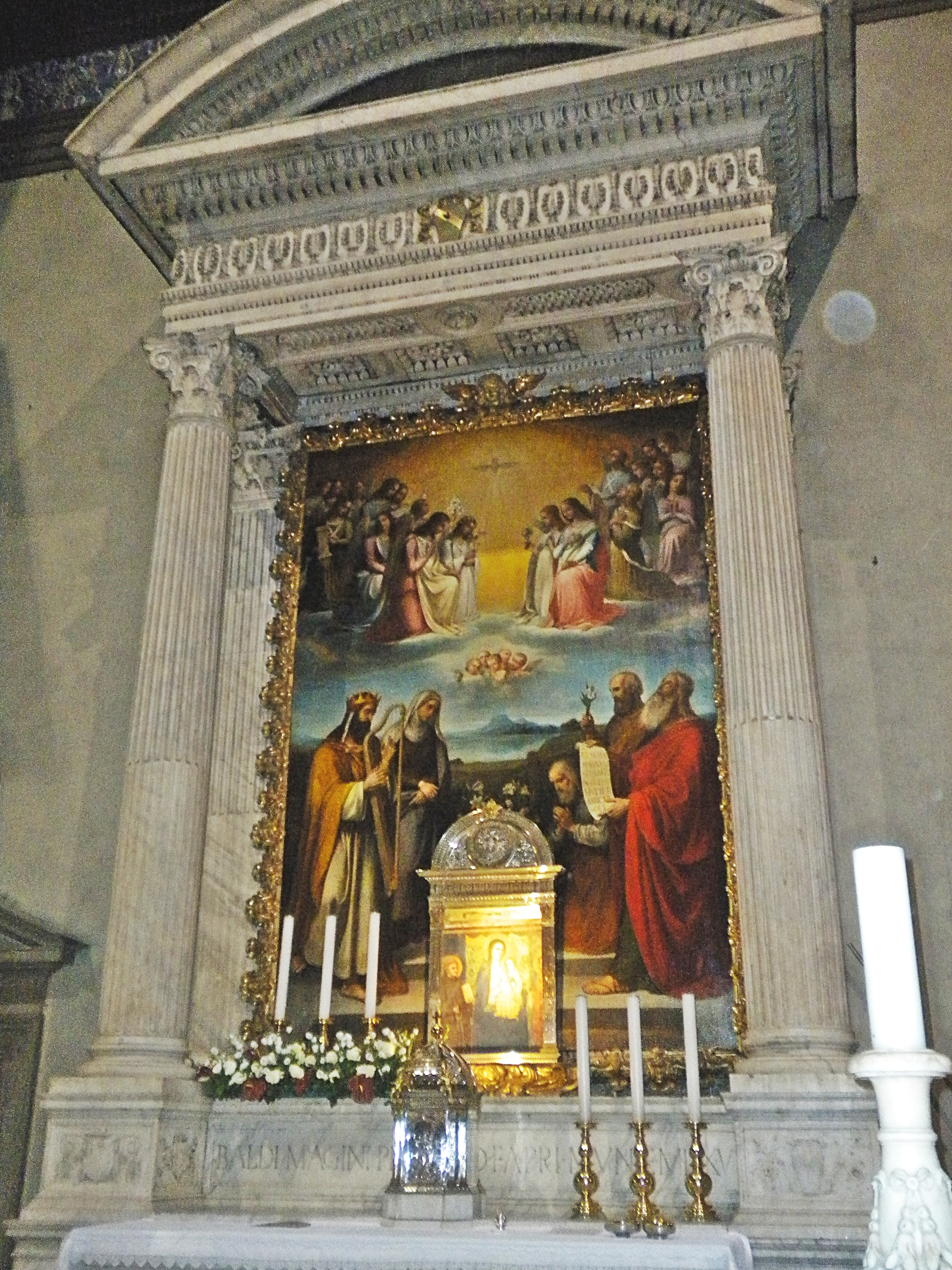
Main Altar

Santa Maria delle Carceri is a basilica church, designed by Giuliano da Sangallo, and built in Prato, Tuscany, Italy. It is among the earliest examples of a Greek cross plan for a complete church in Renaissance architecture.

== History ==
According to the tradition, on July 6, 1484, a painted image of Madonna and Child, located on a wall of the public jail (carceri) of Prato, began to animate itself in the eyes of a local child. It was therefore decided to build a basilica on that site to celebrate the event.

Lorenzo de Medici, lord of the Republic of Florence, imposed a design by his favourite architect, da Sangallo.

The latter's proposal included a Greek cross plan inspired to Filippo Brunelleschi's Pazzi Chapel and by Leon Battista Alberti's theoretical works; Sangallo used the same idea for his first project of St Peter's Basilica, later superseded by Michelangelo. The same model inspired his brother Antonio da Sangallo the Elder for the church of San Biagio at Montepulciano.

The interior of the church was completed from 1486 to 1495, while the exteriors remained unfinished in 1506. The upper part of the western arm was completed in the late 19th century following Sangallo's design.

== Exterior ==
The church has four equal-size arms surmounted by a small dome. The external covering is typically bichrome as in many other Prato's buildings, using white and green marble. The lower fraction shows a framed decoration which originally was to be reproduced in the upper area, finishing with a tympanum (this can be seen only in one arm). The small cupola, of Brunelleschi's inspiration, has a drum with twelve circular windows and a conical covering surmounted by a lantern. The bell tower was realized in 1777-1780 by Francesco Valentini.

== Interior ==
The interior has a solemn Renaissance atmosphere, with the four arms starting from the cubical central hall, surmounted by the semi-spherical dome. All corners are marked by fake columns with precious capitals whose entablatures underline the vault.

The arms are decorated by four stained-glass windows designed by Domenico Ghirlandaio (1491). The entablature has a frieze with festoons and coats of arms in majolica from Andrea della Robbia's workshop; Della Robbia was also author of the tondos with Evangelists (1491), in the pendentives of the dome. The latter has a parapet creating an enlarging perspective effect.

The high altar, designed by Sangallo after that in the Roman Pantheon, is in white marble. The altarpiece is the fresco of the miracle after which the basilica was erected, portraying the Madonna with Child between Sts. Leonard and Stephen (1330–1340).

The presbytery's arms ends with a parapet by Bernardo Buontalenti (1588), flanked by two stone altars (1575).

In the sacristy is a fresco of Madonna of Humility, 1420, and there are some rooms of the ancient jail.

== Images ==
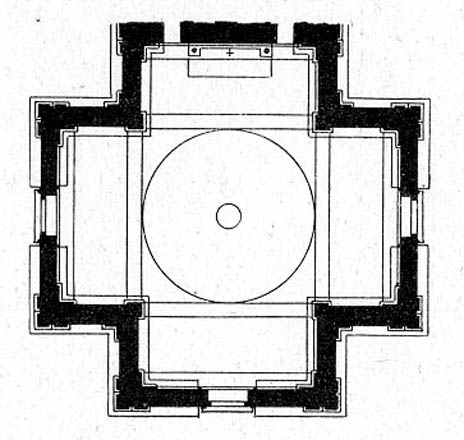
Plan

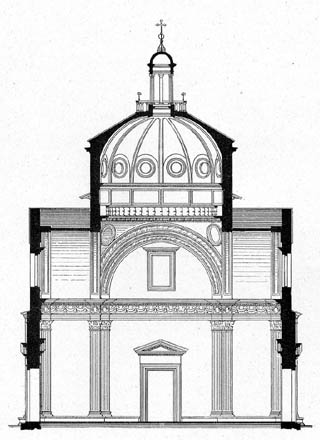
Section

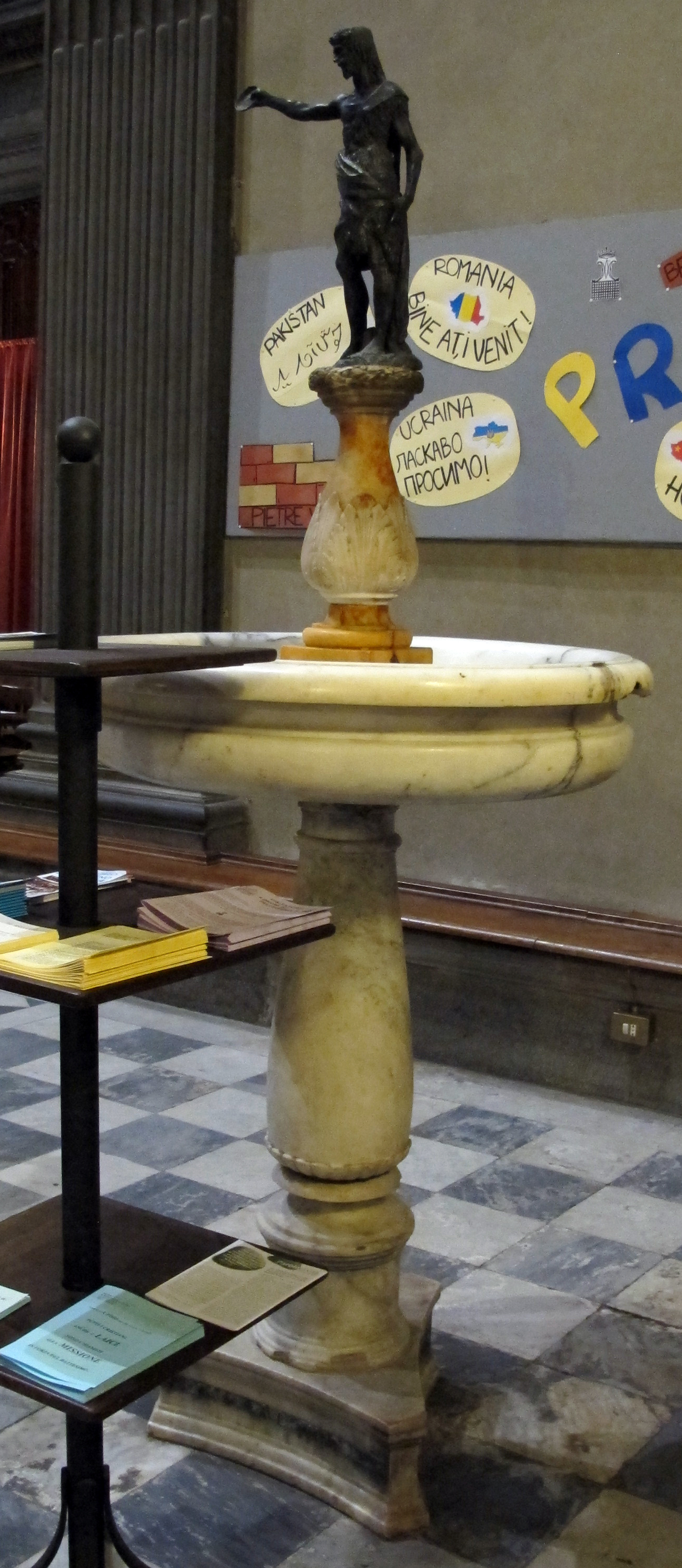

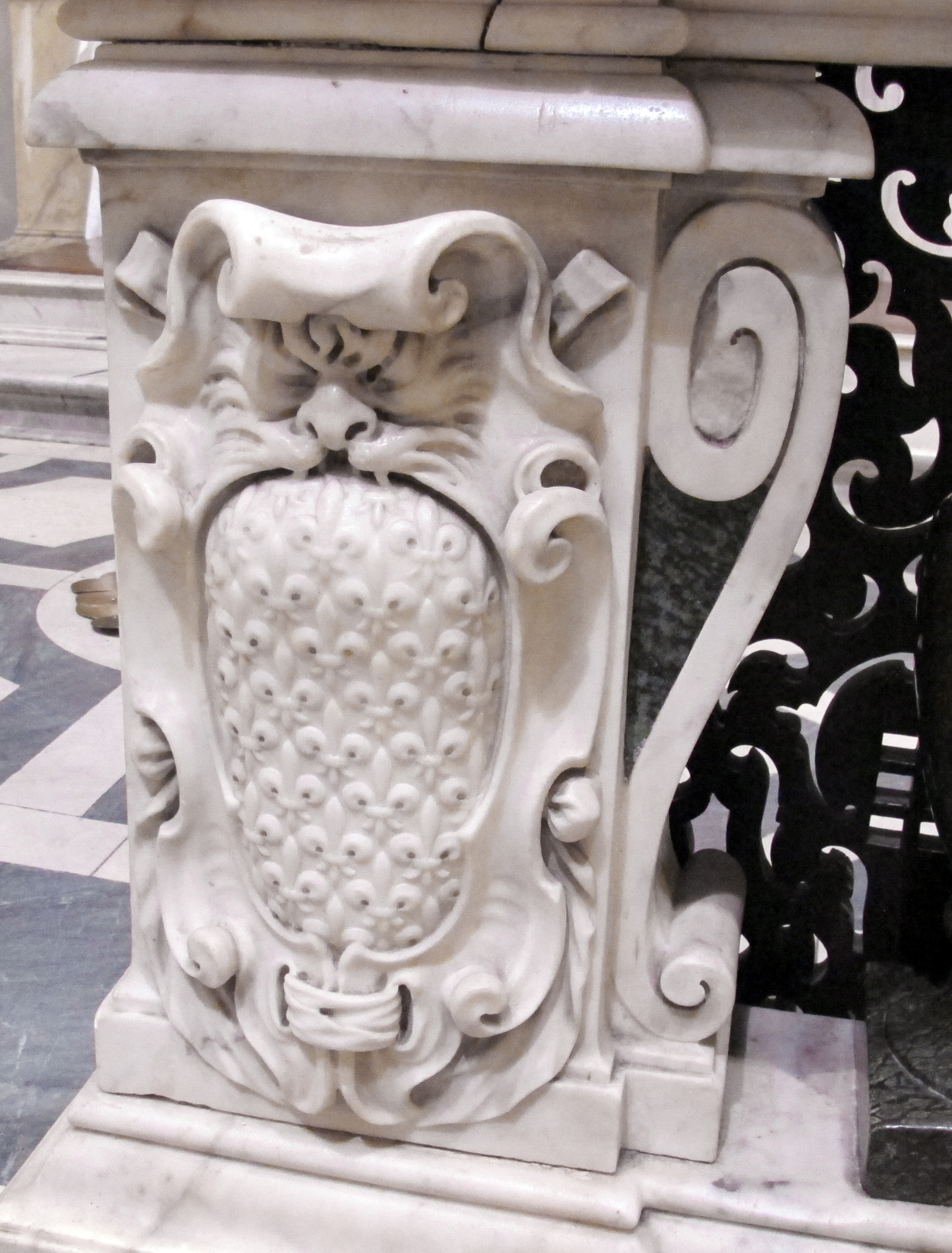

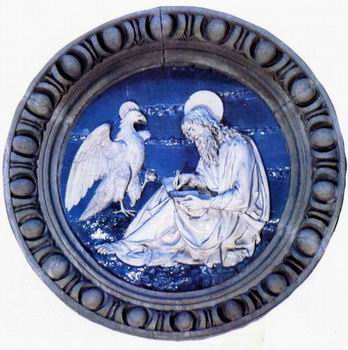

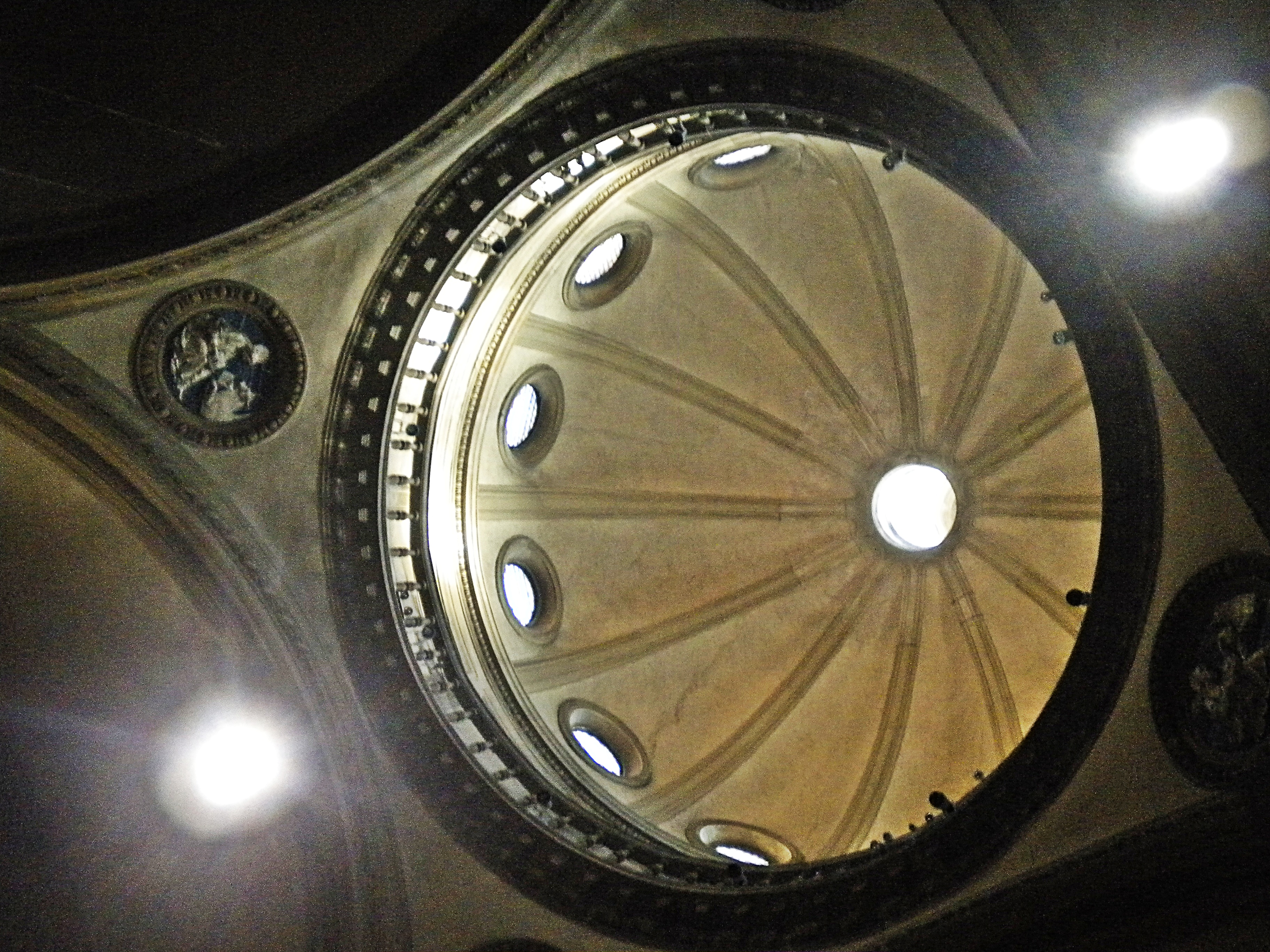
Dome

== See also ==
- Late medieval domes
- Italian Renaissance domes

== Notes ==
A small church called Santa Maria delle Carceri is found at a Franciscan monastery on Mount Subasio in Umbria, built around the Eremo delle Carceri.
