= Navicelli =

Type of Tuscan boat

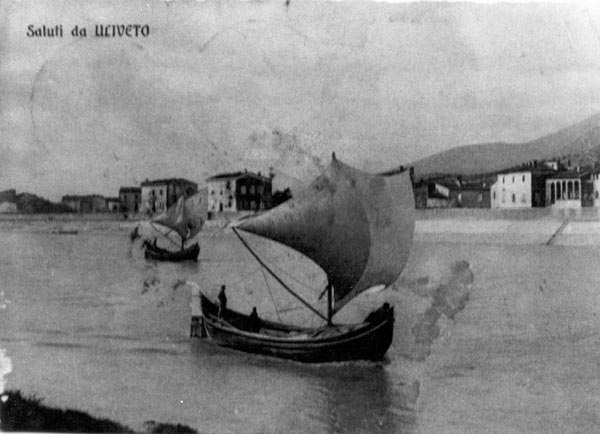
Navicelli in Uliveto Terme.

Navicelli are small sized (15-meter) Tuscan boats that transported goods. The boats are flat with rounded sizes and a load capacity of 25 tonnes.

The boatmen who rode the navicelli were called "navicellai".

Every 25th June until the year 1250, navicellai competed in a regatta starting from San Jacopo sopr'Arno.

The Italian boat manufacturer Picchittio started out as a navicelli builder back in 1575. Benetti is another yacht manufacturer that started out in the second half of the 19th century by building navicelli boats among other things.

== Other uses ==
Navicelli di Pisa Srl is the public company in charge of managing the Navicelli channel.

== See also ==
- Navicelli channel
