= San Biagio, Montepulciano =

Church building in Montepulciano, Italy

Coordinates: 43°05′27″N 11°46′28″E

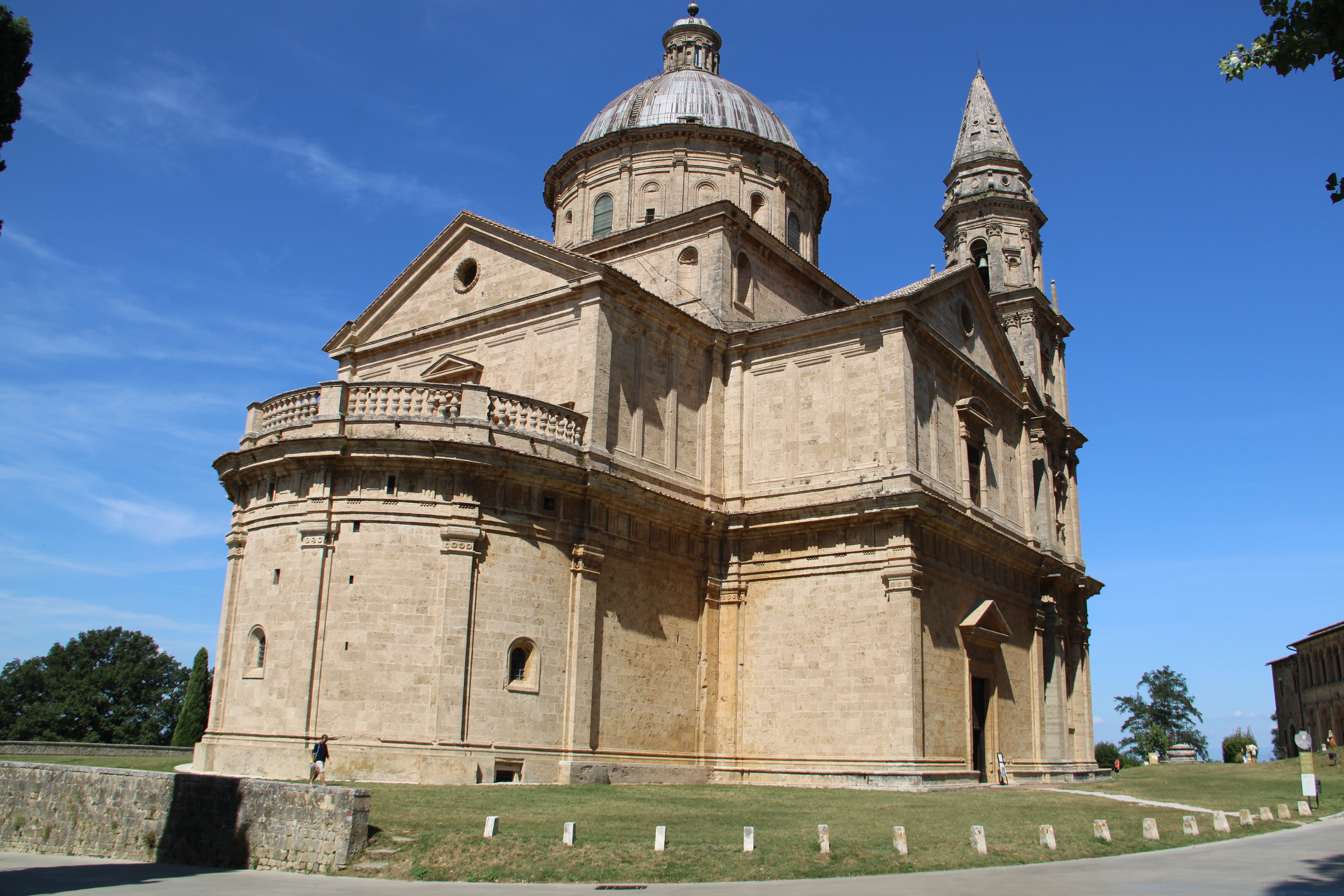
San Biagio of Montepulciano.

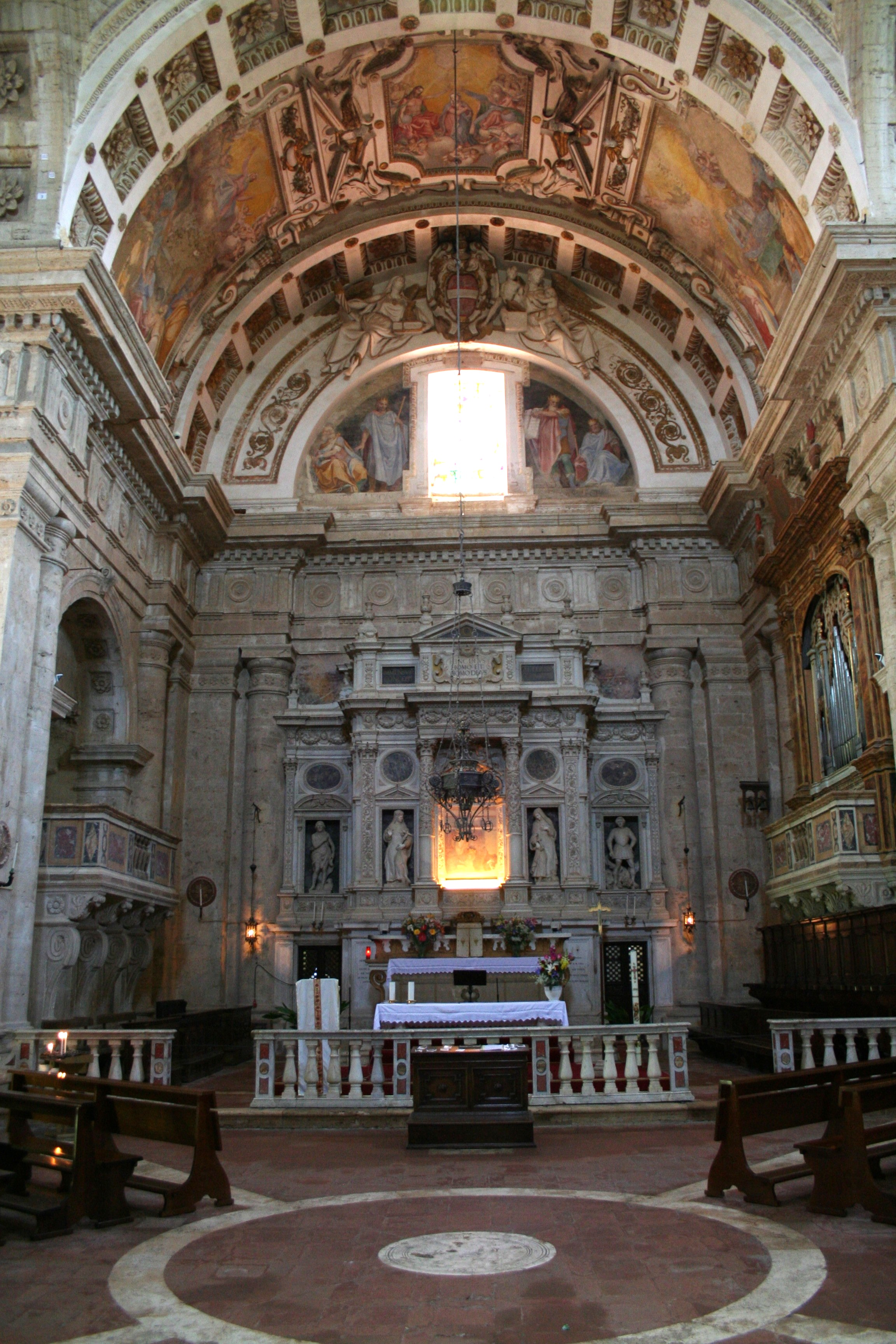
Interior view.

San Biagio is a church outside Montepulciano, Tuscany, central Italy.

== History ==
The church, which was built between 1518 and 1540, an example of Renaissance Greek cross central plan, was designed by Antonio da Sangallo the Elder, who was inspired by the Basilica of Santa Maria delle Carceri in Prato, which had been designed years before by his brother Giuliano da Sangallo. The same plan, taken from Filippo Brunelleschi's works, was used for the original design by Bramante and Michelangelo for St. Peter's Basilica, as well as for the church of Santa Maria della Consolazione in Todi, of uncertain paternity.

The late Renaissance building was constructed on the site of a pre-existing Palaeochristian pieve dedicated to St. Mary and subsequently to St. Blaise. In the early 16th century only remains existed of the pieve, including a wall with a fresco of Madonna with Child and St. Francis, from a 14th-century Sienese painter. The project was supported by Pope Leo X, who had studied under Angelo Poliziano, a native of Montepulciano.

The construction lasted until 1580 and, after Sangallo's death, was directed by other superintendents.

== Description ==
The church is a Greek cross plan, with a central dome supported by a drum. The side opposite to the entrance has a semi-circular apse.

The main façade, whose scheme is repeated (with some minor changes) on the two side ones, is divided into two sectors by a large entablature featuring a frieze with triglyphs and metopes which runs for the whole perimeter of the edifice. The lower sector houses the portal, on which is the foundation date. Above it is a window, in turn surmounted by a triangular pediment with, in the middle, a circular oculus. All the exterior is formed by travertine slabs.

The façade is flanked by the multifloor bell tower, with numerous decorative elements, which ends in a pyramidal cusp. The design included two symmetrical towers, but only one was built.

== See also ==
- 16th-century Western domes

== Sources ==
- Barcucci, E. (2000). Il Tempio di San Biagio a Montepulciano. Le Balze.
