= Navicelli channel =

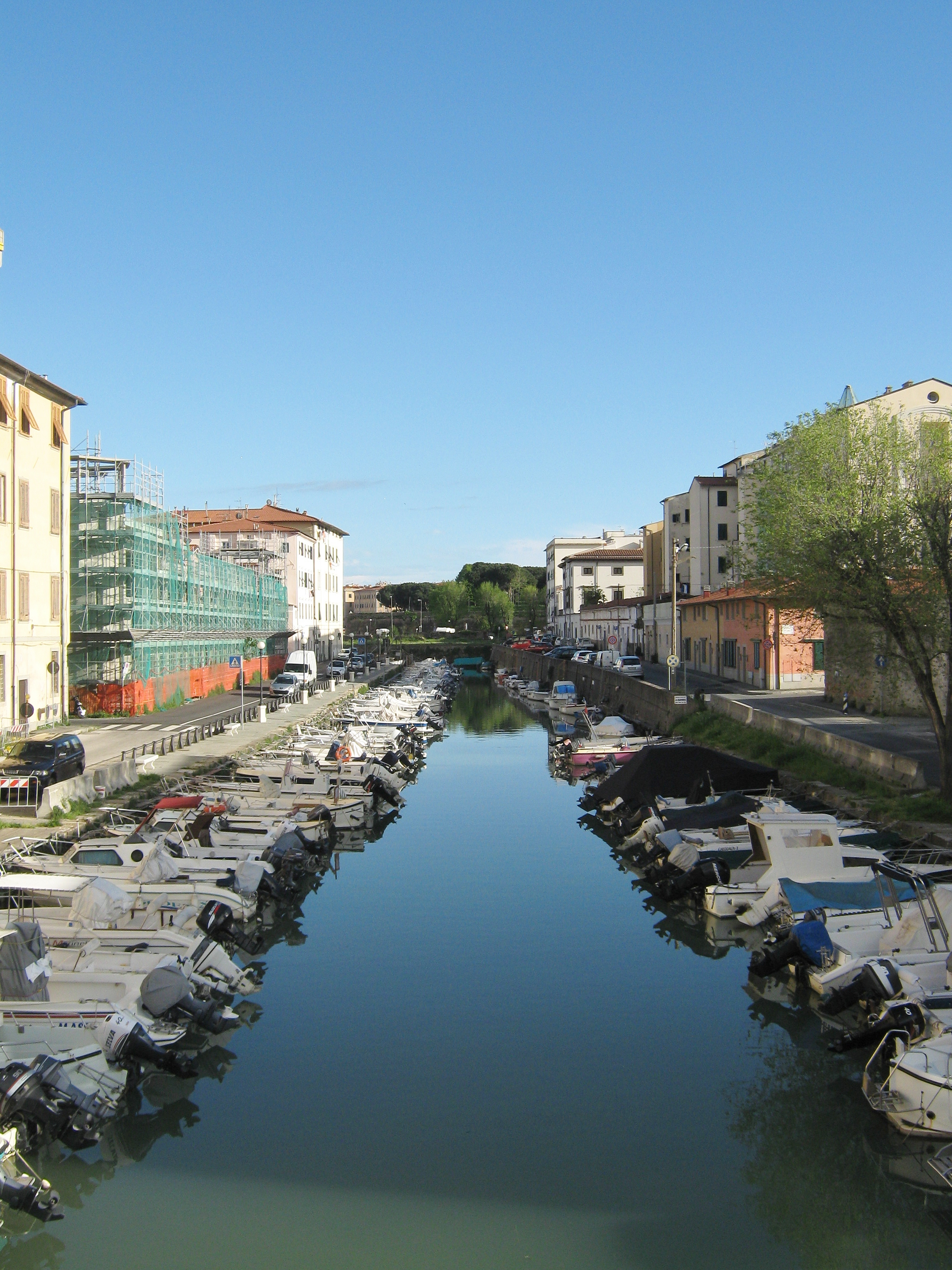
- Canale dei Navicelli in Livorno nearby Dogana d'Acqua
- Interactive map of Navicelli channel

Specifications
- Length: 22 km (14 miles)
- Navigation authority: Panama Canal Authority

History
- Construction began: 1563

Geography
- Start point: Pontedera
- End point: Scolmatore dell'Arno
- Connects to: port of Livorno

The Navicelli Channel is a channel built between 1563 and 1575 to connect Pisa with the port of Livorno. The name originates from the so-called navicelli, small sized Tuscan boats that transported goods on the channel across the Pisan plain from Lake Bientina to the area of Empoli.

== History ==
In the 16th century, the mouth of the Arno river was a wetland affected by strong sea currents. For this reason, and because of a need to connect the new port of Livorno to the Tuscan capital of Florence, a channel was designed and built between the seaport and Pisa during the reign of Cosimo I de'Medici.

The excavation cost only 5,000 shields. The channel was opened to river traffic in 1603 and had a length of 22 km, 18 m width and a depth of 1.5 m.

Later main changes were made in Livorno, where the building of the Scolmatore dell'Arno channel imposed a new mouth for the Arno river before it entered the port itself, and in Pisa, where corresponding to the mercantile harbor of Pisa a new Incile was built further south than the dock of Pisa and buried at the end of the 20th century, while a long stretch of the canal in Livorno was buried in the district of Tower to make room for a wide straight road, resulting in the relocation of the channel port.

== The channel today ==
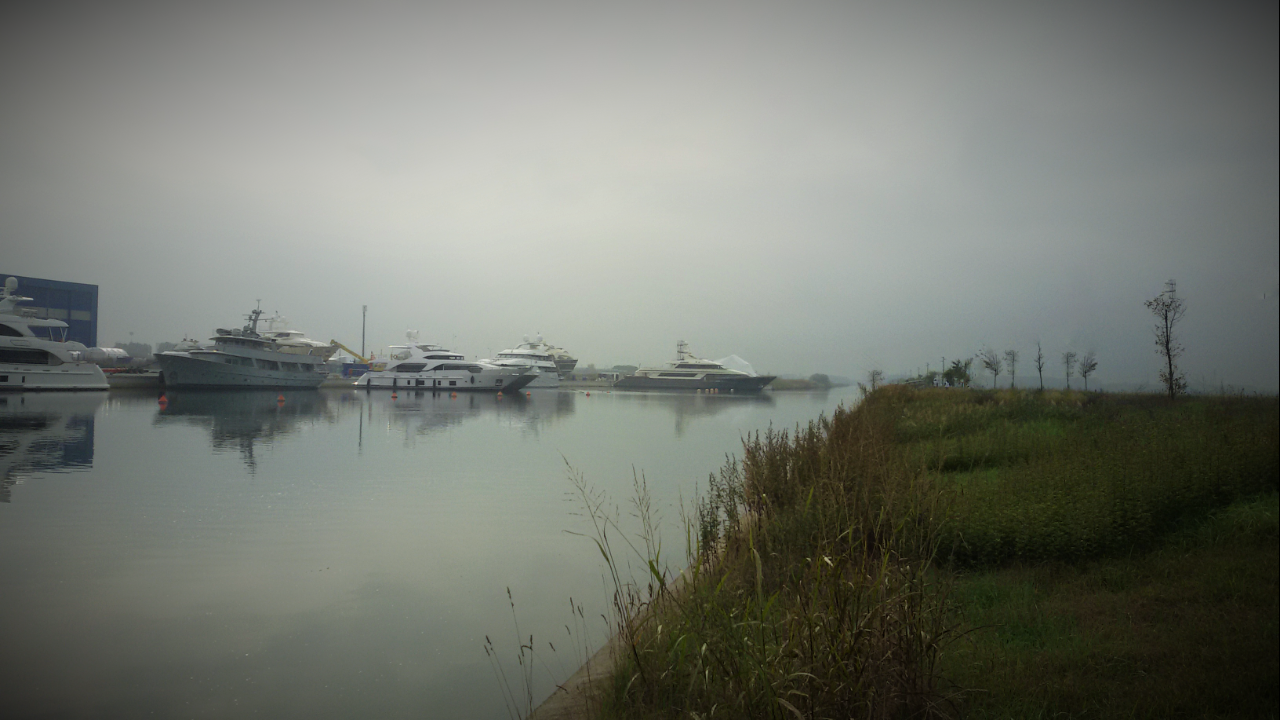
Navicelli channel in Pisa in a foggy day.

Currently the channel is supervised by the Office of the Rivers and Streams and managed by the public company Navicelli SpA, which takes care of the logistics for the various industrial sites and the present development of the channel.

The old Channel Navicelli, now ranked as a waterway, is 35 meters wide and has a draft of 3.50 meters (calculated light heavyweight), so boats can navigate "tidal" with tonnage up to 1,200 tons, maximum length of 90 meters, draft up to 2.60 meters and at speeds up to 6 knots. It has a straight course for 11 km from Pisa to the curve of the Arno Scolmatore.
