= Port of Livorno =

Coordinates: 43°33′44″N 10°17′42″E

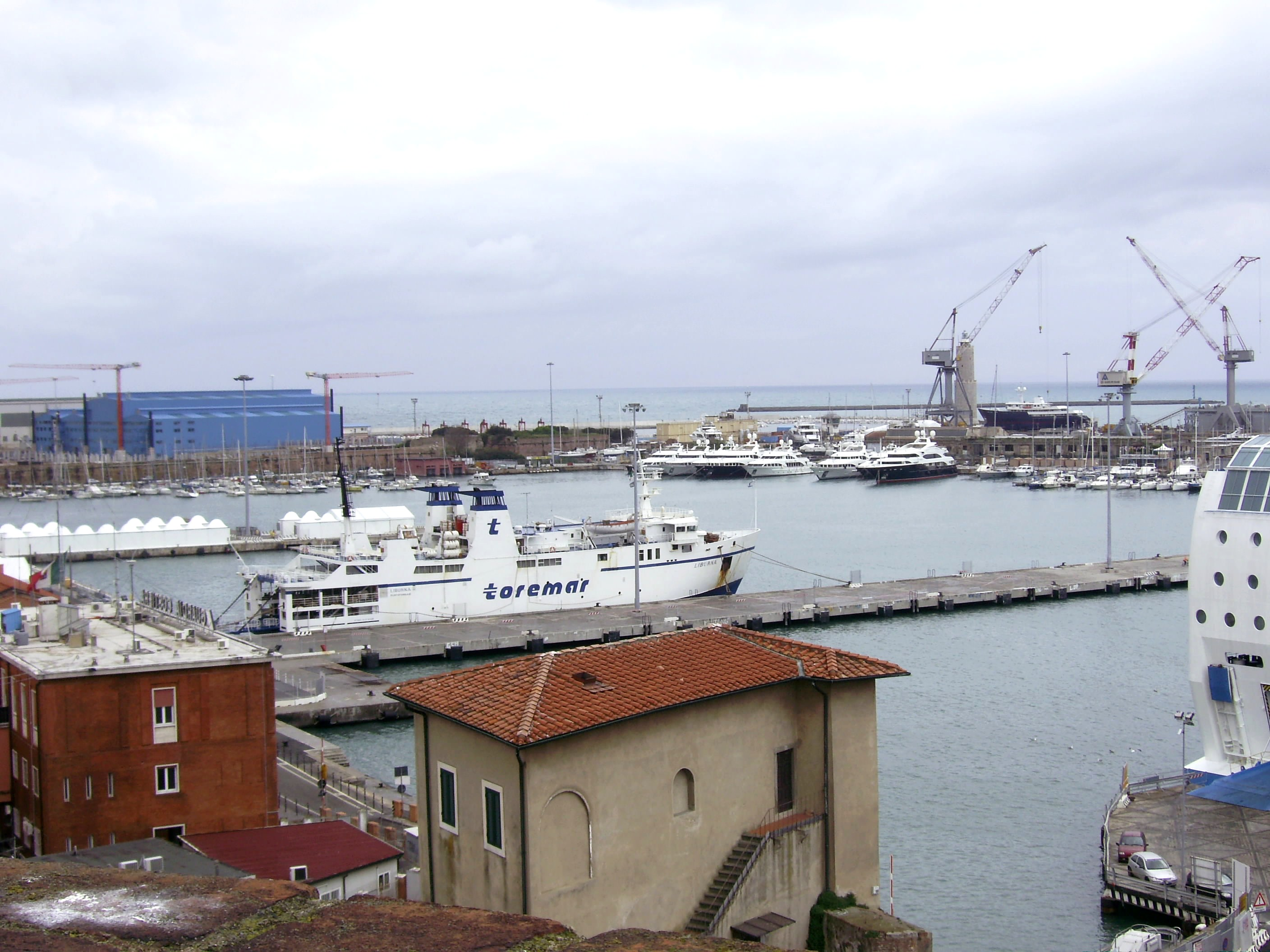
- Harbour
- Interactive map of Port of Livorno

Location
- Country: Italy
- Location: Livorno

Details
- Owned by: Port Authority of Livorno
- Type of Harbor: Natural/Artificial
- Size of harbour: 160 ha (1.6 km^{2})
- Land area: 25 ha (0.25 km^{2})
- Size: 185 ha (1.85 km^{2})
- No. of berths: 29
- No. of wharfs: 50
- Employees: 15,000 (2007)
- President: Giuliano Gallantii

Statistics
- Vessel arrivals: 7,173 (2011)
- Annual cargo tonnage: 29.6 million tonnes (2011)
- Annual container volume: 637,798 TEU (2011)
- Passenger traffic: 2.0 million people (2011)
- Annual revenue: US$ 1.1 billion (2007)
- Website www.porto.livorno.it

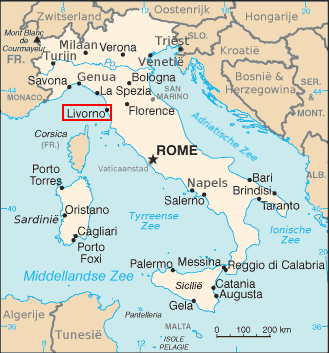
Location of Livorno

The Port of Livorno is one of the largest Italian seaports and one of the largest seaports in the Mediterranean Sea, with an annual traffic capacity of around 30 million tonnes of cargo and 700,000 TEU's.

The port is also an important employer in the area, with more than 15,000 employees who provide services to more than 7,000 ships every year.

The Port of Livorno is considered a major Italian port along the Tyrrhenian Sea Corridor, capable of handling all kinds of vessels (LoLo, RoRo, liquid bulk, dry bulk, cruise ships, ferryboats). The port mainly serves Tuscany, Emilia-Romagna, Umbria and Marche regions of Italy.

== Description ==
The Port of Livorno is situated on the Ligurian Sea, in the north-western part of Tuscany. The harbour is divided in Porto Vecchio (Old Port) and Porto Nuovo (New Port) and is composed of four main basins.

=== Avamporto ===
The Avamporto is a vast area outside the harbour bounded to the south by the Diga della Vegliaia, to the west by the Diga Curvilinea and to the east by the outer side of Molo Mediceo. This area include the Nuovo Bacino di Carenaggio (New dry dock) and Morosini Port used by Benetti shipyard.

=== Porto Vecchio ===
Porto Vecchio (Old Port) occupies the southern part of the harbour and comprises: Porto Mediceo (Medicean Port), Vecchia Darsena (Old Dock), Nuova Darsena (New Dock), Bacino Cappellini (Cappellini Dock) and Bacino Firenze (Firenze Dock).

=== Bacino Santo Stefano ===
Bacino Santo Stefano (St. Stephen basin) is bordered to the north by the Diga del Marzocco (Marzocco breakwater), to the west by the Diga della Meloria (Meloria breakwater) built in 1900, which is the straight extension of 550 meters of the Diga Curvilinea, the Alto Fondale dock, the Darsena Petroli (Oils Dock), the Darsena dei Calafati (Caulker Dock) and the first part of the waterway that bring to the Porto Industriale.

=== Porto Nuovo ===
Porto Nuovo (New Port) is situated in the northern sector of the harbour and correspond to the Porto Industriale which enclose: the Darsena Toscana (Tuscany dock), the Darsena Inghirami (Inghirami dock), the Darsena Ugione (Ugione dock), the Canale Industriale (Industrial canal) and the Canale dei Navicelli.

== Porto Vecchio ==
=== Vecchia Darsena ===
Vecchia Darsena (Old Dock) was a small basin besides to Vecchia Fortezza with the entrance toward south-west repaired on the west side by Andana degli Anelli. From here 12 galleys departed on June 8, 1571 to take part in the Battle of Lepanto. The Vecchia Darsena is still operating and used as harbour from fishing boats and patrol vessels.

=== Porto Mediceo ===
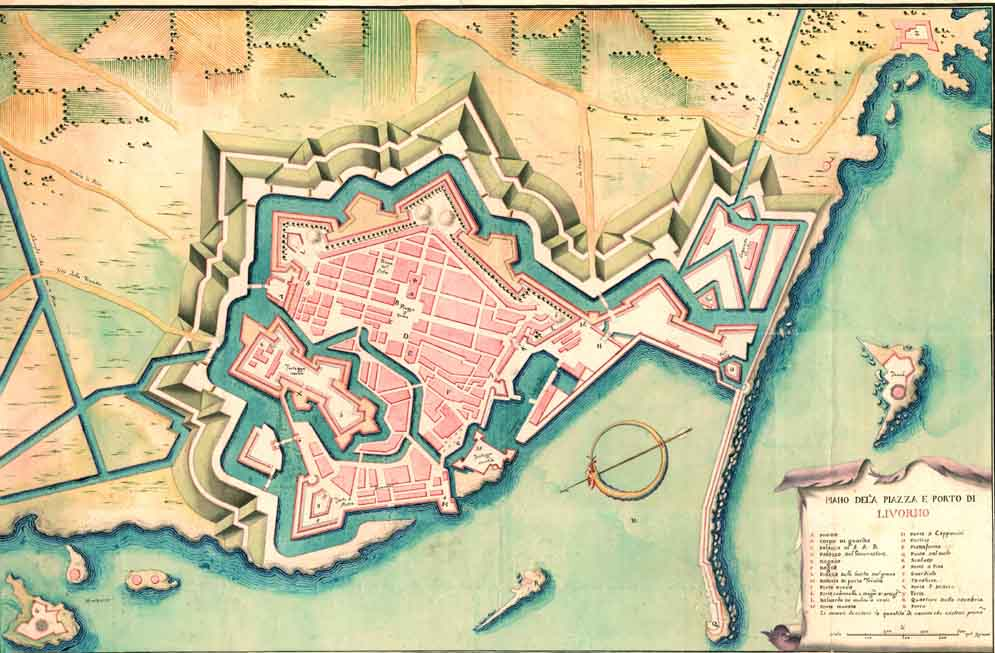
A 17th century map showing Porto Mediceo

Porto Mediceo is a fortified quadrangular perimeter once open towards north and is the oldest part of Port of Livorno. It was ordered by Cosimo I who called Bartolomeo Ammannati in 1572 for the project, but the construction was realized after his grand duchy. In the following years Claudio Cogorano, Antonio Cantagallina and Robert Dudley contributed to the project. The project involved the construction of wharfs with defensive walls to connect Fortezza Vecchia (Old Fortress) with the Fanale dei Pisani (Light of the Pisans).

The first wharf has a whole length of 348 meters and was built under Ferdinando I, it is called Molo Ferdinando or Andana degli Anelli. The word Andana had at that time the meaning of vessels moored parallel to a wharf. Molo Ferdinando start from the inlet opening to the Vecchia Darsena (Old Dock), near the Fortezza Vecchia, until the second wharf perpendicular to it. This wharf is called Molo Cosimo or Andana delle Ancore for the reason that was built under Cosimo II. It has a length of 240 meters and finish before to reach the Fanale dei Pisani for the reason that the Sassaia reef blocked the construction. In this place was built a block-house called Fortino della Sassaia (Sassaia Fortress).

The third wharf is the perpendicular extension of the Molo Cosimo built from the Sassaia reef towards north-west, parallel to the coast line, in order to give a repair to the harbour, it is called Molo Mediceo (Medicean wharf) or Molo del Forte (Fortress wharf). It has a length of 470 meters and a width of 250 meters and has at its extremity a fortress, called Fortezza del Molo (Wharf Fortress), once equipped with 27 guns and 200 soldiers in order to defend the port entrance and to maintain the harbour neutrality. It is evident that Porto Mediceo has had at that time an important military and strategic considerations in addition to those of commercial nature as it could accommodate 140 vessels.

Porto Mediceo remained with the plan unchanged until 1853 when was built the Diga Rettilinea. This breakwater, that was not connected to the coastline, had the intent to protect the Medicean Port from the waves coming from north. At the end of the 19th century the Diga Rettilinea was connected to the land and a new dock, called Darsena del Mandraccio was built near Fortezza Vecchia. A new port plan was approved in 1906 and regarded the construction of two breakwaters: the Diga della Meloria and the Diga del Marzocco.

=== Nuova Darsena ===
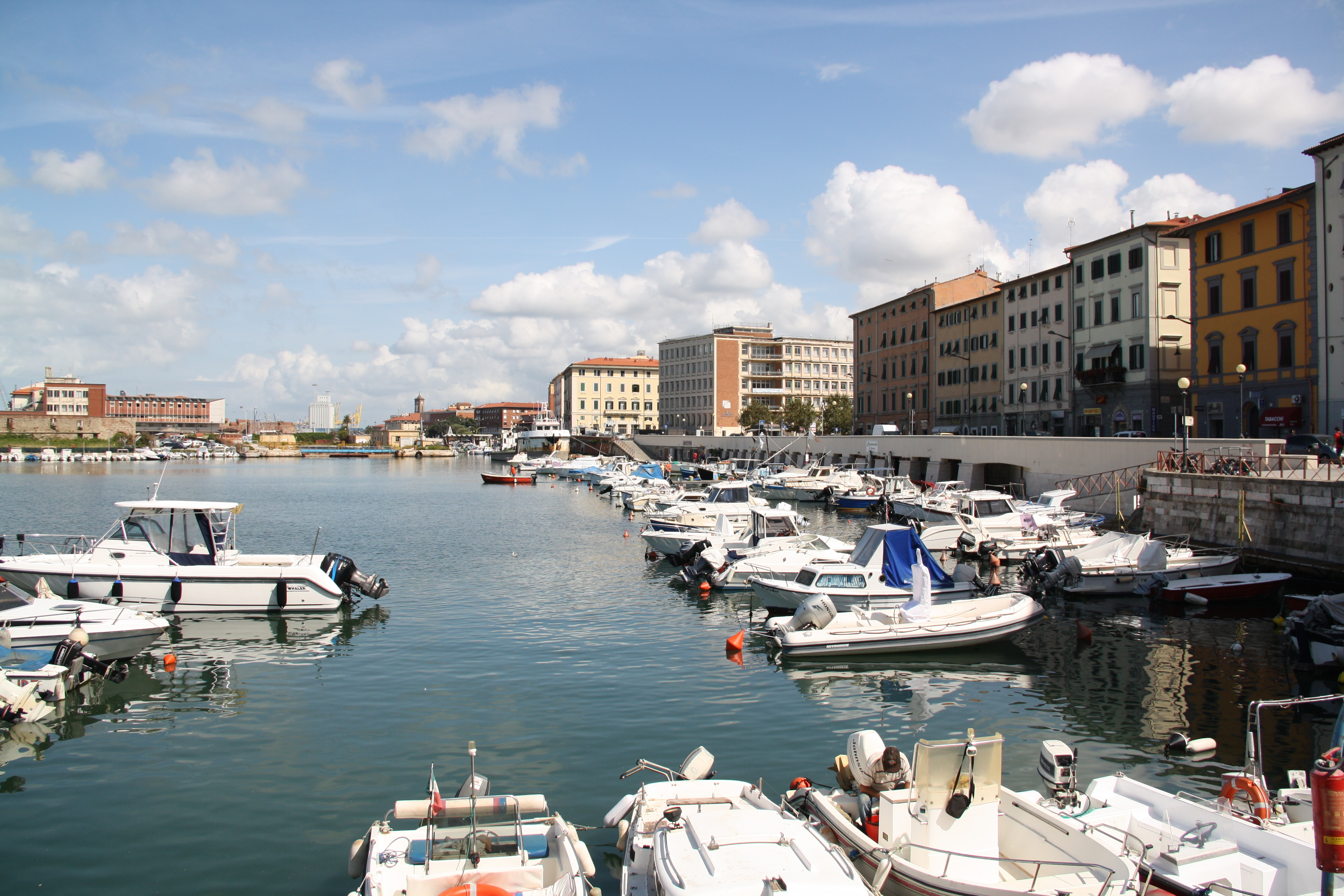
Nuova Darsena

The Cantiere navale fratelli Orlando was built by the Orlando family in 1866 on an area that until 1852 was occupied by Lazzeretto San Rocco next to Fosso Reale (Royal ditch). The canal in that place was enlarged and a dock, called San Rocco, was formed. The dock changed later name in Nuova Darsena (New Dock) and was connected to Porto Mediceo in order to allow to the ships to reach the shipyard and vice versa. A new slipway, called Scalo Umbria, was built on the south side of the basin and a dry dock was built on the north side. Nowadays this part of the shipbuilding is no longer in use and the warehouses and sheds have been dismantled and the area is undergoing a transformation to turn it into a residential area called Porta a Mare.

== Porto Nuovo ==
=== Porto Industriale ===
The construction of the new port started in 1910 when the new coastal railway line connecting Pisa with Rome was opened. Due to World War I the works were interrupted until 1922 when a variant to the Port Plan was proposed. It was planned by Coen Cagli regarding an enlargement of the port to the north of Bacino Santo Stefano inside the coastline with a series of canals and docks near the industrial facilities. The port was then rebuilt after the severe damage caused by World War II and a new plan was approved in 1953. It regarded the reconstruction of quays and their equipments, the construction of Darsena Petroli to allow the berthing of the tankers, a new wharf named Santo Stefano and Molo Italia 800 meters long and 150 meters wide. In the following years numerous variants to the plan were approved in order to adequate the port facilities and docks.

=== Canale dei Navicelli ===
The Navicelli Channel is a channel built between 1563 and 1575 to connect Pisa with the port of Livorno. The name originates from the so-called navicelli, small sized Tuscan boats that transported goods on the channel.

== Breakwaters ==
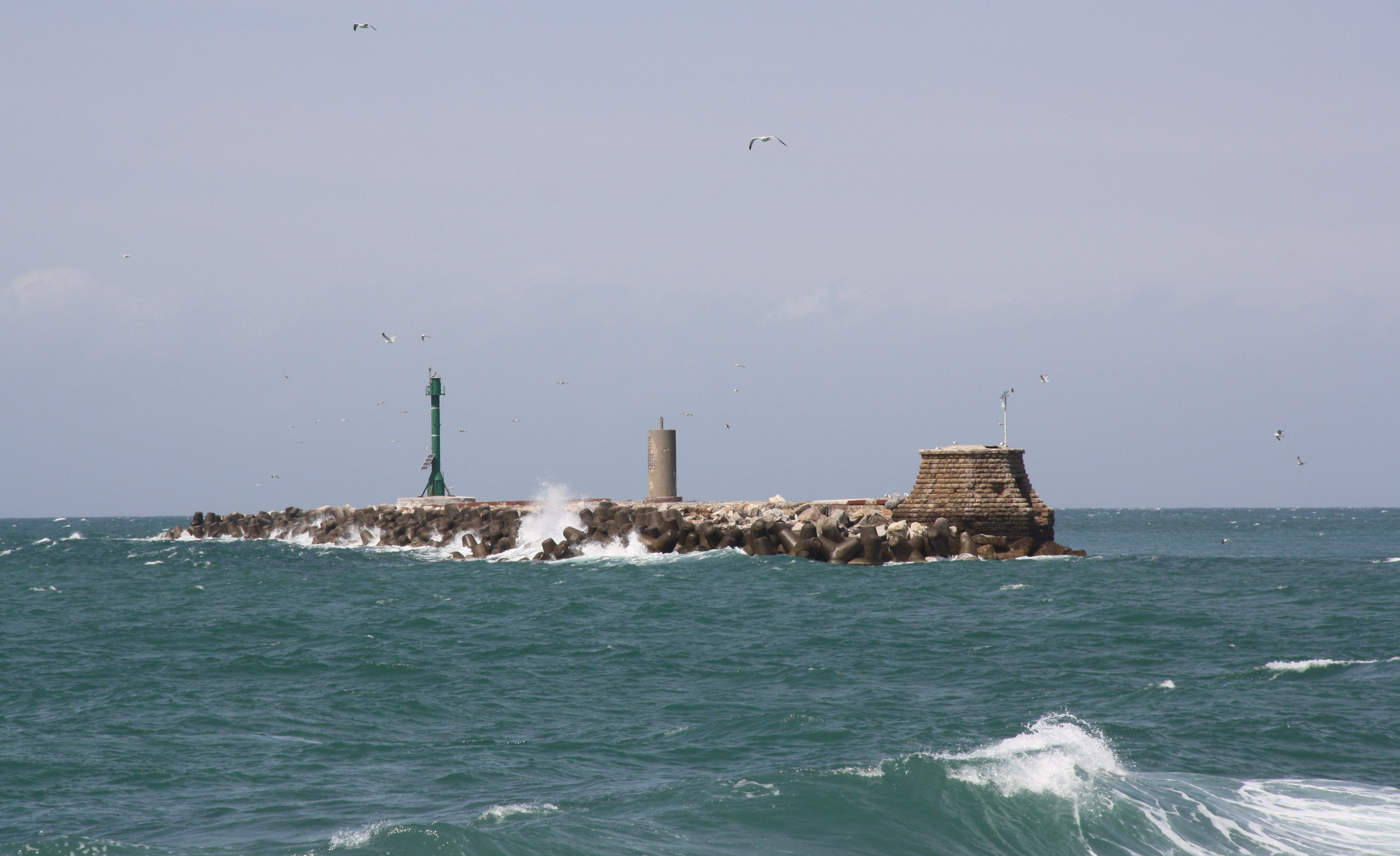
Diga della Vegliaia

=== Diga della Vegliaia ===
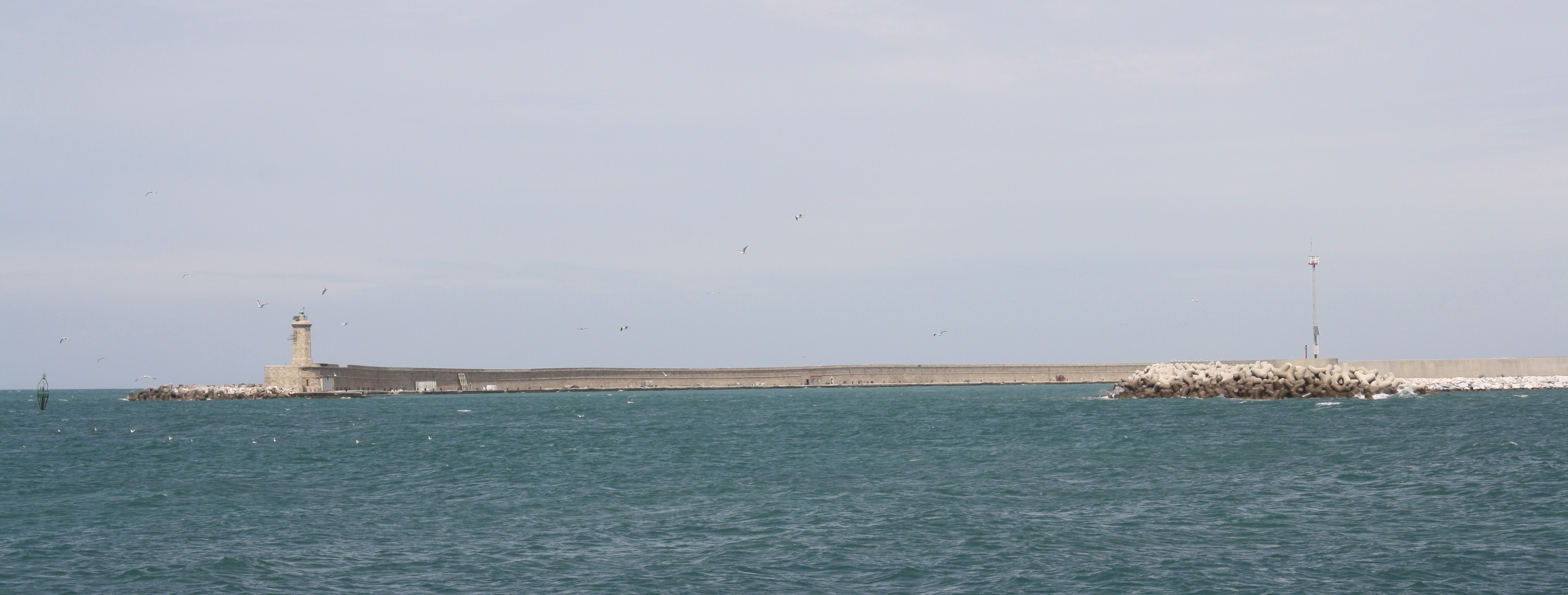
Diga Curvilinea

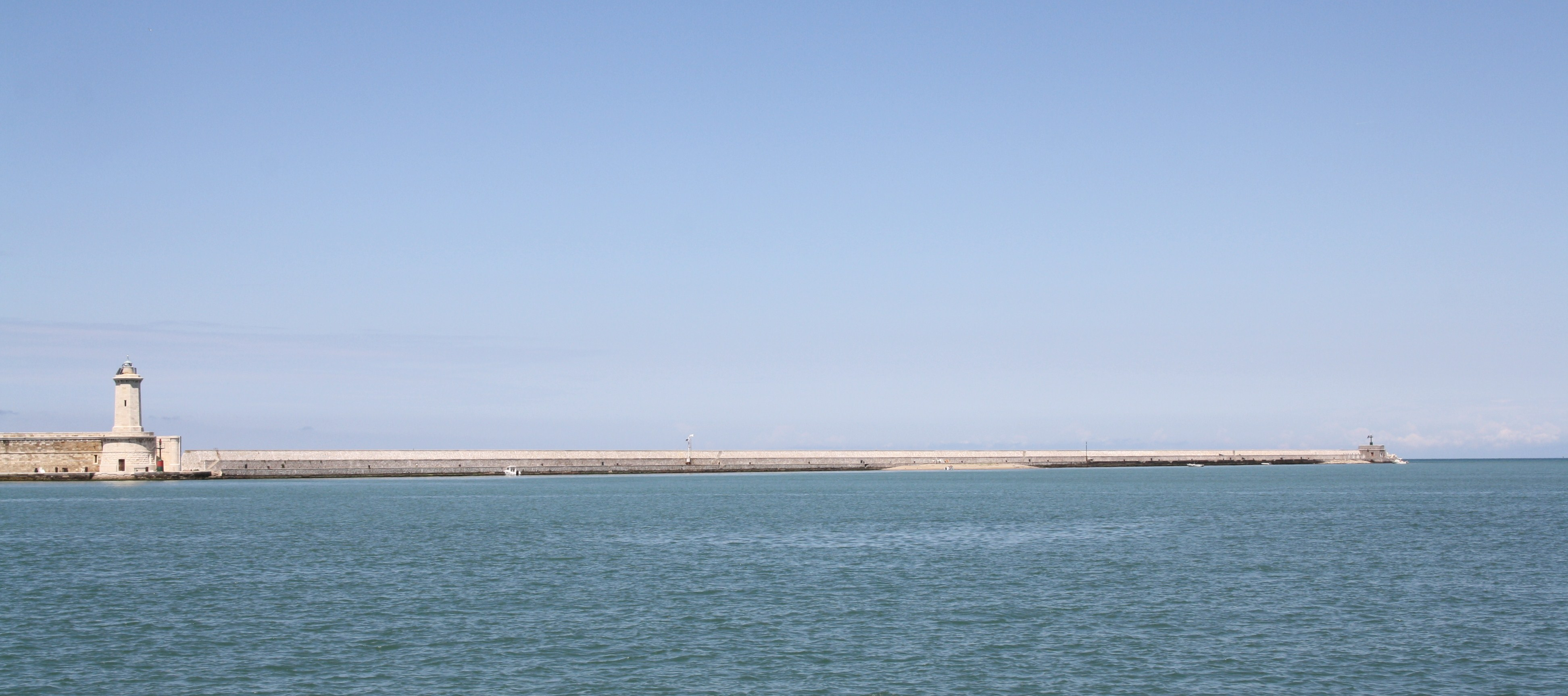
Diga della Meloria

The Diga della Vegliaia was built on the place called Vegliaia where there were cliffs at 460 metres from the coast. The breakwater has the aim to protect the southern entrance of the port by the prevailing winds. It was built from 1888 to 1900, has a rectilinear structure, a length of 490 meters and the direction of 105° - 285°.

=== Diga Curvilinea ===
The last Grand Duke of Tuscany Leopold II ordered in 1852 the construction of the Diga Curvilinea (Curvilinear), called Molo Novo from the inhabitants, which delimits to the west the Avamporto. It is a massive construction, built on project by Victor Poirel, formed by a substructure made of artificial rocks while the upper part is surmounted by a wall that protects the Avamporto. The Diga Curvilinea was completed in 1863, it is situated at 800 meters from the harbour and 400 meters from the Fanale dei Pisani, has a length of 1,150 meters with a cord of 1,000 meters and an average width of 8.50 meters.

=== Diga della Meloria ===
The Diga della Meloria, which construction was approved in 1906, is the straight extension, 704 metres long, of the Diga Curvilinea toward north-west with the aim to repair the new Bacino Santo Stefano.

=== Diga del Marzocco ===
The Diga del Marzocco was built according to Cozza plan of 1908, concerning the construction of the breakwater, parallel to the Diga Rettilinea, from the Torre del Marzocco (Marzocco Tower) toward the Diga della Meloria. In this manner a second harbour opening, 300 meters wide, was created in the northern part forming the Bacino di Santo Stefano (Santo Stefano dock).

== Lighthouses ==
=== Fanale dei Pisani ===
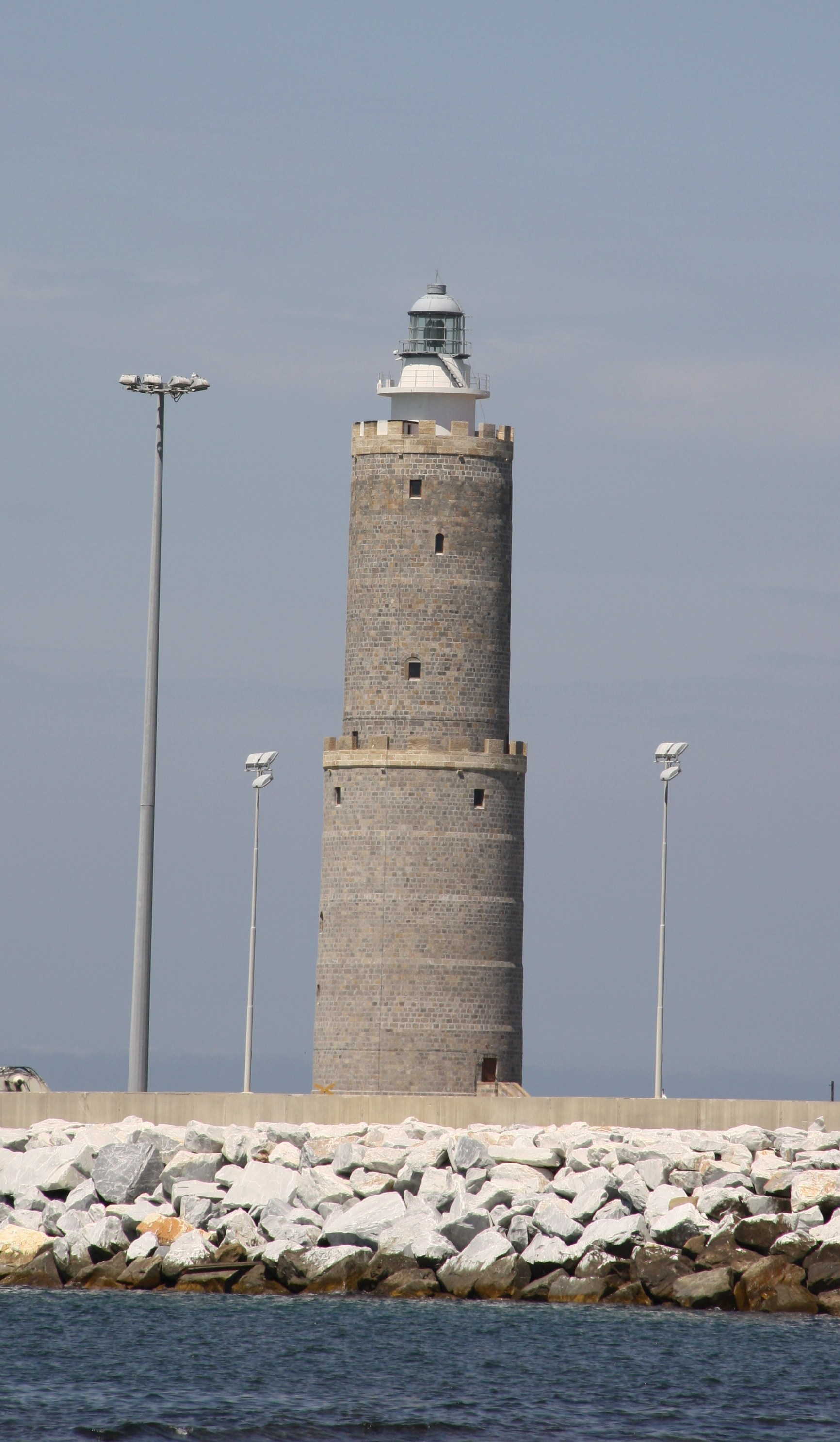
Fanale dei Pisani

Livorno Lighthouse, called Fanale dei Pisani, for the reason that was built by Pisans in 1303 on project attributed to Giovanni Pisano and by the master builders Rocco Entello De Spina and Bonaggiunta Ciabatti whose names were found engraved on a stone. The lighthouse was built on an emerging rock surrounded by the sea at the south entrance of the harbour; it is formed by a polygonal basement of 13 sides over which is placed the tower formed by two cylinders both with an embattled balcony and the lantern on the top. It consists of 11 floors, connected each other by a spiral staircase up to 53 meters, every floor is 3.72 meters high expect the first and the second respectively 5.55 and 4.22 meters. The lower part is made of four cylinders of decreasing diameter and the upper part of three which makes thin the tower toward the summit.

The lighthouse was built employing the white Verruca stone coming from San Giuliano cave near Pisa. At first was used oil lamps for the light, then compressed oil, in 1841 was installed the Fresnel lens and was used the acetylene gas lamp; at the end of 1800s the installation was electrified. Ferdinando I de' Medici, Grand Duke of Tuscany order the construction of warehouses in the basement in 1584 which were transformed in the Lazzaretto di San Rocco and a shipbuilding. In 1911 the lighthouse passed under the jurisdiction of the Italian Navy as is still.

The tower came intact until June 20, 1944 when the German troops, at the approaching of the Allied, blew up it. The Fanale was rebuilt in June 1954 according to the original project with material recovered from the ruins and from the cave; it is made by reinforced concrete 30 centimetres thick covered externally by stone. The new lighthouse was inaugurated on September 16, 1956 by President Giovanni Gronchi on the occasion of the 350th anniversary of the declaration to the status of city.

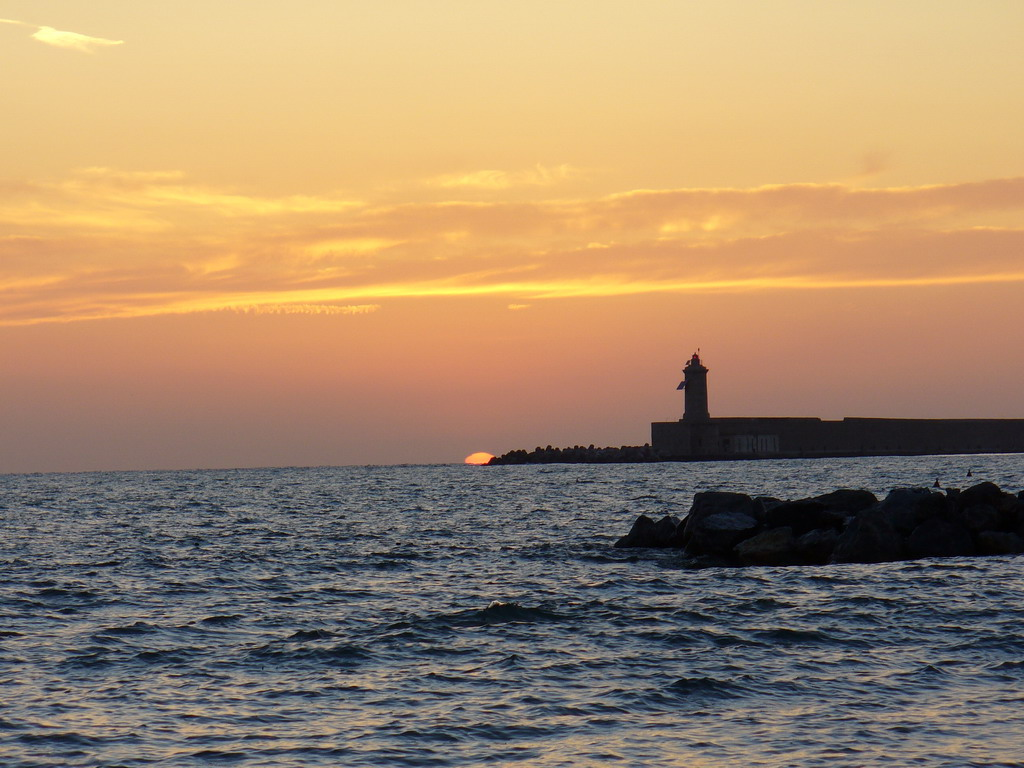
Diga Curvilinea south end lighthouse

=== Diga Curvilinea Lighthouse ===
The lighthouse was built in 1857 and is positioned at the south end of the Diga Curvilinea breakwater at the entrance of the Port of Livorno. It is formed by a cylindrical basement surmounted by an octagonal tower in stone with balcony and lantern placed at 22 metres above sea level. The lighthouse, operated by Marina Militare with the identification number 1911 E.F, is active and fully automated, has a solar power unit and an alternating white and red flashes in a three seconds period visible up to 10 nautical miles.

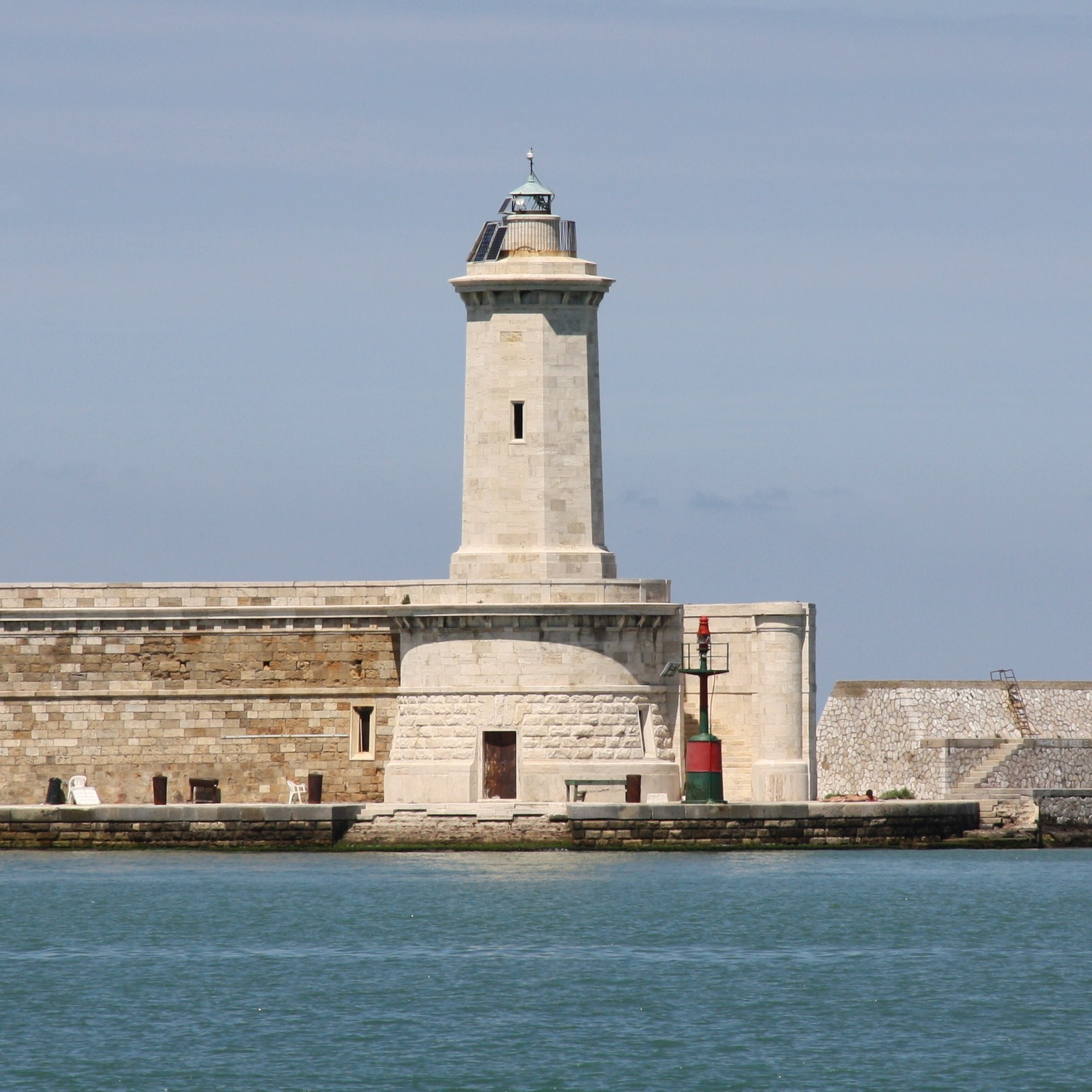
Diga Curvilinea north end lighthouse

=== Diga Curvilinea estremità Nord Lighthouse ===
The lighthouse was built in 1857 and is positioned at the north end of the Diga Curvilinea breakwater which was connected to the Diga della Meloria in 1906. The old lighthouse is formed by a cylindrical basement with an octagonal tower in stone with balcony and lantern placed at 22 metres above sea level. The historical lighthouse is no longer active after the construction of the Diga della Meloria; it was replaced by a starboard left side light painted in red and green horizontal bands operated by Marina Militare with the identification number 1941 E.F. The light is positioned at the base of the historical lighthouse, is fully automated, has a solar power unit and an alternating green and red single flashing in a three seconds period visible up to 5 nautical miles.

=== Diga del Marzocco light ===
The first Diga del Marzocco lighthouse was built in 1917, the current sector light is a compact metal structure similar to a classic bottle painted in red placed on a concrete basement. The light is operated by Marina Militare with the identification number 1906 E.F., it is fully automated, has a solar power unit and three alternating red single flashing in a 10 seconds period with a focal plan at 13 metres above sea level.

=== Diga della Vegliaia light ===
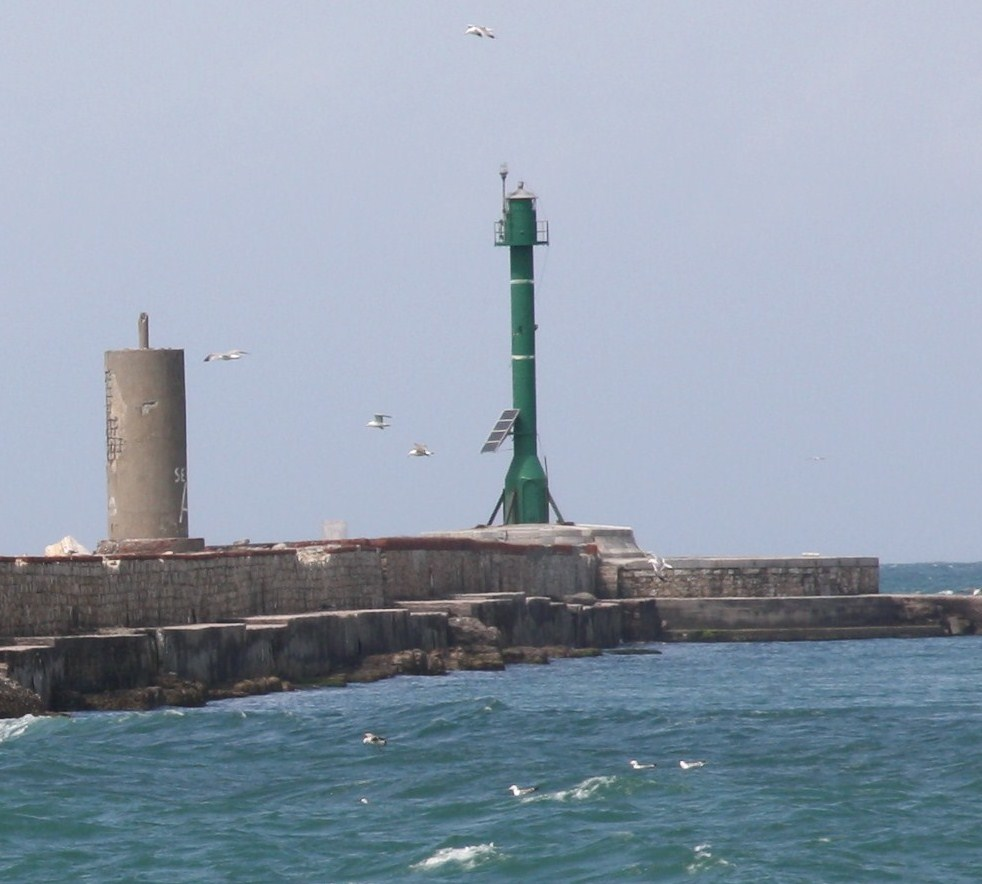
Diga della Vegliaia Light

The first Diga della Vegliaia lighthouse was built in 1895, the current sector light is a cylindrical green metal tower 13 metres high. The light is operated by Marina Militare with the identification number 1916 E.F., it is fully automated, has a solar power unit and a green single flashing in a 3 seconds period visible up to 12 nautical miles.

=== Diga Rettilinea light ===
This sector light is placed at the extremity of Diga Rettilinea at the entrance of Medicean Port. The light is a compact metal structure similar to a classic bottle painted in red operated by Marina Militare with the identification number 1946 E.F.; it is fully automated, has a solar power unit and two alternating red single flashing in a 6 seconds period with a focal plan at 8 metres above sea level visible up to 6 nautical miles.

=== Molo Mediceo light ===
This sector light is placed at the extremity of Molo Mediceo at the entrance of Medicean Port. The light is a compact metal structure similar to a classic bottle painted in green operated by Marina Militare with the identification number 1951 E.F.; it is fully automated, has a solar power unit and two alternating green single flashing in a 6 seconds period with a focal plan at 6 metres above sea level visible up to 6 nautical miles.

== Statistics ==
In 2007 the Port of Livorno handled 32,934,594 tonnes of cargo and 745,557 TEU's, making it one of the busiest cargo ports in Italy and one of the largest container ports in the country.

General statistics between 2001 - 2019
Year	2001	2002	2003	2004	2005	2006	2007	2016	2017	2018	2019
RoRo^{*}	6,143,084	7,127,138	7,715,140	7,988,808	9,023,158	9,735,170	12,250,098	12,413,062	14,420,456	15,953,171	16,041,803
Liquid bulk^{*}	9,499,913	9,243,308	8,455,074	8,156,069	8,626,687	8,508,475	9,037,492	8,362,816	8,835,225	9,527,429	9,045,286
Dry bulk^{*}	1,314,121	1,395,843	1,403,809	1,336,217	1,185,848	1,186,571	1,169,737	831,615	757,048	781,992	782,190
Break bulk^{*}	2,705,853	2,390,834	2,512,755	2,700,010	2,565,106	2,742,083	3,138,598	2,012,242	1,662,141	1,756,795	1,703,721
Nr of passengers	?	1,677,484	1,803,237	1,991,513	2,050,994	2,308,684	2,282,440	3,283,841	3,217,255	3,438,965	3,566,271
Containers (TEU's)	531,814	546,882	592,778	638,586	658,506	657,592	745,557	800,475	734,085	748,024	789,833
Containers^{*}	5,001,982	5,171,249	5,640,076	6,870,035	6,809,953	6,458,267	7,338,669	9,196,116	8,027,301	8,538,918	9,142,326
Total^{*}	24,664,953	25,328,372	25,726,854	27,051,139	28,210,752	28,630,566	32,934,594	32,815,851	33,702,171	36,588,305	36,715,346

* figures in tonnes

== Terminals ==
Frozen food terminal The terminal has an area of 18,009 m^{2}, a storage capacity of 35,000 m^{2}, and an annual traffic capacity of around 200,000 tonnes.

Copper and non-ferrous metals The copper and non-ferrous metals terminal has a storage capacity of 95,821 m^{2} and a quay length of 500 m.

Cereals The cereal terminals have an area of 63,000 m^{2}, a quay length of 336 m and a storage capacity of 115,560 tonnes.

Automobile terminal The Port of Livorno has one RoRo terminal with a total length of 1,741 m, a land area of 477,060 m^{2}, storage capacity of 6,000 cars and a transshipment capacity of 1,200,000 units per year.

Container The container terminal has an area of 658,000 m^{2}, a quay length of 1,550 m and an annual traffic capacity of 2,000,000 TEU's.

Break - bulk The break bulk cargo terminal is specialised in handling timber, non - ferrous metals, cellulose, paper, sand, clay, coal, bentonite and metal products. The terminal has an area of 181,567 m^{2}, a storage area of 71,221 m^{2} and a storage capacity of 160,000 m^{3}.

Multi use terminal The terminal has a storage are of 25,000 m^{2} and a quay length of 96 m.

Liquefied natural gas The Port of Livorno has a LNG terminal with a capacity of four billion m^{3} owned by Endesa and Amga opened in 2007 after an investment of US$560 million.

== See also ==
- List of lighthouses in Italy
