= Livorno Lighthouse =

Fanale dei Pisani
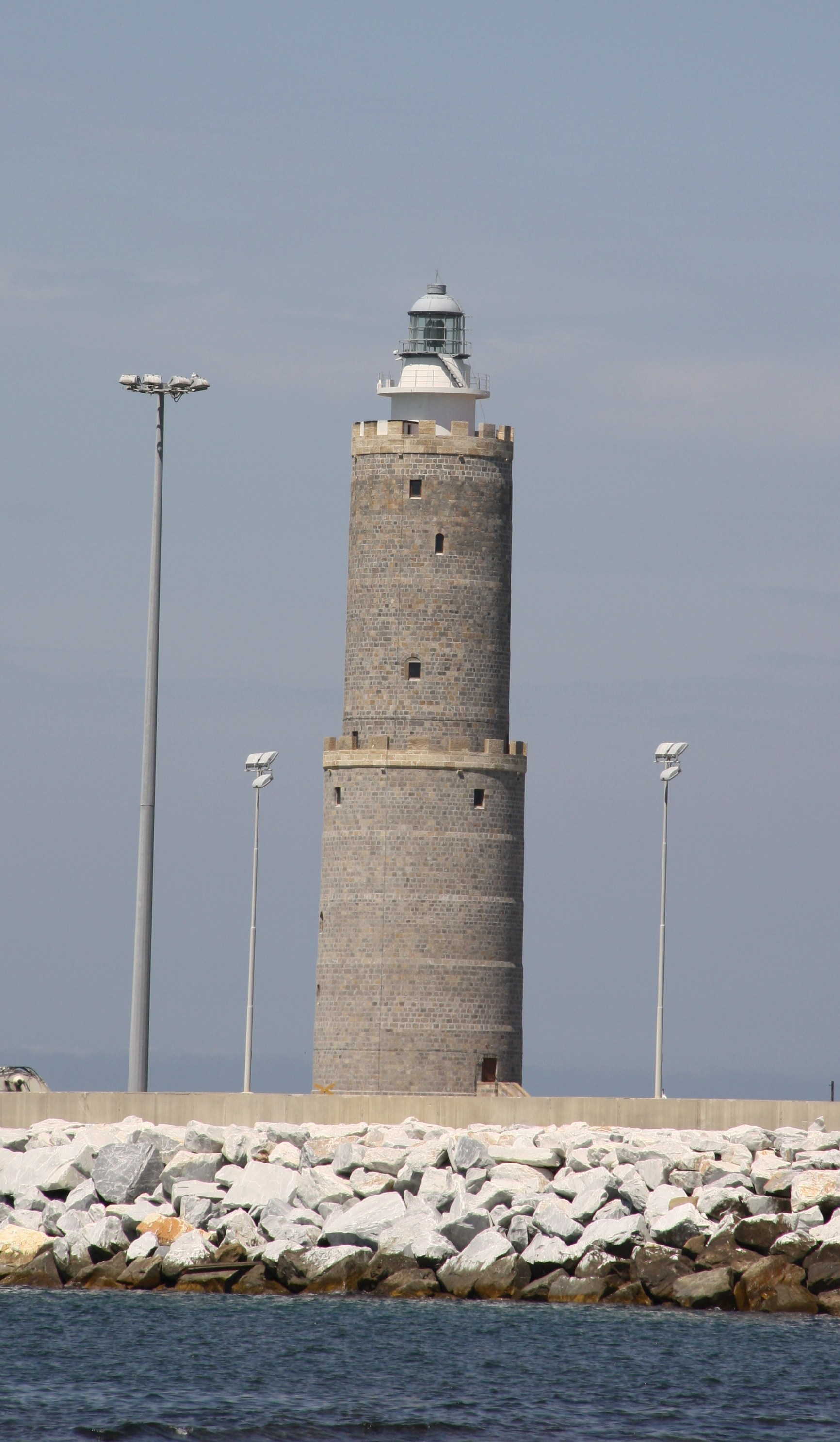
- Fanale dei Pisani
- Location: Livorno; Tuscany; Italy
- Coordinates: 43°32′38″N 10°17′41″E
- Constructed: 1154 (first); 1303 (second)
- Foundation: octagonal base
- Construction: stone and concrete tower
- Height: 53 metres (174 ft)
- Shape: two-stage cylindrical tower with balcony and lantern
- Markings: unpainted gray stone, white lantern, gray metallic dome
- Operator: Marina Militare
- Racon: LI

Light
- First lit: 1954 (current rebuilt)
- Deactivated: 1944-1956 (destroyed by Germans)
- Focal height: 52 metres (171 ft)
- Lens: Type OR Q4; Focal length: 250 mm
- Intensity: main: AL 1000 W reserve: LABI 100 W
- Range: main: 24 nautical miles (44 km; 28 mi) reserve: 18 nautical miles (33 km; 21 mi)
- Characteristic: Fl (4) W 20s.
- Italy no.: 1896 E.F

The Livorno Lighthouse (Italian: Faro di Livorno) is an active lighthouse located at the south entrance of the Port of Livorno in Tuscany on the Ligurian Sea.

== History ==
The lighthouse's name Fanale dei Pisani comes from the Pisans who built it in 1303. The project is attributed to Giovanni Pisano and master builders Rocco Entello De Spina and Bonaggiunta Ciabatti, whose names were found engraved on a stone. The lighthouse was built on an emerging rock surrounded by the sea at the south entrance of the harbor. The structure of the lighthouse is formed by a polygonal basement of 13 sides. Over everything is a tower formed by two cylinders. Each cylinder has an embattled balcony and a lantern at the top. The structure consists of 11 floors connected to each other by a 53 metres (174 ft) spiral staircase. Every floor is 3.72 metres (12.2 ft) high with the exception of the first and second floors which are respectively 5.55 metres (18.2 ft) and 4.22 metres (13.8 ft). The lower part of the lighthouse is made of four cylinders of decreasing diameter. The upper part of the lighthouse is made of three cylinders which results in the tower becoming thinner toward the summit.

The lighthouse was originally built with white Verruca stone from San Giuliano cave near Pisa. Oil lamps were initially used for the light and were then replaced by compressed oil. In 1841, Fresnel lens were installed and acetylene gas lamp were used. At the end of the 1800s, the installation was electrified. Ferdinando I de' Medici, Grand Duke of Tuscany ordered the construction of warehouses in the basement in 1584, which were later transformed into Lazzaretto di San Rocco and a shipbuilding yard. In 1911, the lighthouse passed under the jurisdiction of the Italian Navy where it remains to this day.

The tower was intact until June 20, 1944, when the German troops blew it up as the Allied approached. The Fanale was rebuilt in June 1954 according to the original project with material recovered from the ruins and from the San Giuliano cave. It was made from reinforced concrete 30 centimeters thick and covered externally by stone. The new lighthouse was inaugurated on September 16, 1956, by President Giovanni Gronchi on the 350th anniversary of Livorno's proclamation as a city.

== Description ==
The tower is covered by grey stone and the lantern dome is painted grey metallic. The light is positioned at 52 metres (171 ft) above sea level and emits four white flashes in a 20 seconds period visible up to a distance of 24 nautical miles (44 km; 28 mi). The lighthouse is completely automated, as the last keeper Renzo Fiorentini left, and managed by the Marina Militare with the identification code number 1896 E.F.

== See also ==
- List of lighthouses in Italy
