= Antonio da Sangallo the Elder =

Italian architect

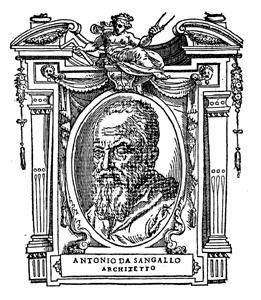
- Born: c. 1453; Florence, Republic of Florence
- Died: 27 December 1534 (aged 80–81); Republic of Florence
- Occupation: Architect
- Children: Giulio di Giuliano de' Medici (godson)

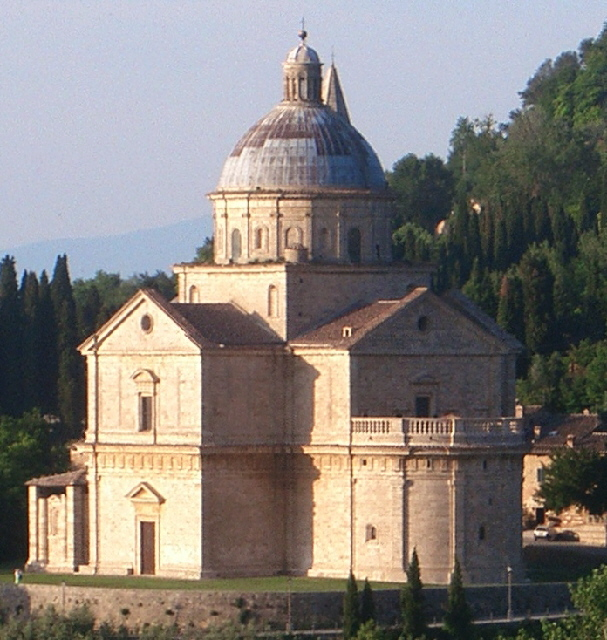
San Biagio, Montepulciano, 1518 — consecrated 1529

Antonio da Sangallo the Elder (c. 1453 – 27 December 1534) was an Italian Renaissance architect who specialized in the design of fortifications.

== Biography ==
Antonio da Sangallo was born in Florence.

Sangallo's father Francesco Giamberti was a woodworker. His brother Giuliano da Sangallo and nephew Antonio da Sangallo the Younger were also architects. Sangallo's godson, Giulio de Medici (the future Pope Clement VII) was raised in his household until the boy reached the age of seven, when Giulio's uncle Lorenzo the Magnificent became his full-time guardian.

Sangallo often worked in partnership with his brother; however, he executed a number of independent works. As a military engineer he was especially skillful, building important works at Arezzo, Montefiascone, Florence and Rome. His most outstanding work as an architect is the church of San Biagio at Montepulciano, in plan a Greek cross with central dome, "the first of the great cinquecento domes to be completed". and two towers—resembling, on a smaller scale, Bramante's design for St. Peter's Basilica.

Sangallo also built a palace in the same city, various churches and palaces at Monte San Savino, and, at Florence, a range of monastic buildings for the Servite monks. His other works includes he church of San Biagio at Montepulciano, the Forte Sangallo of Civita Castellana and the Old Fortress of Livorno. Antonio retired early from the practice of his profession, and spent his latter years in farming.
