= Old Fortress, Livorno =

Building in Livorno, Italy

Old Fortress
- Fortezza Vecchia
- Part of the defences of Livorno
- Livorno, Italy
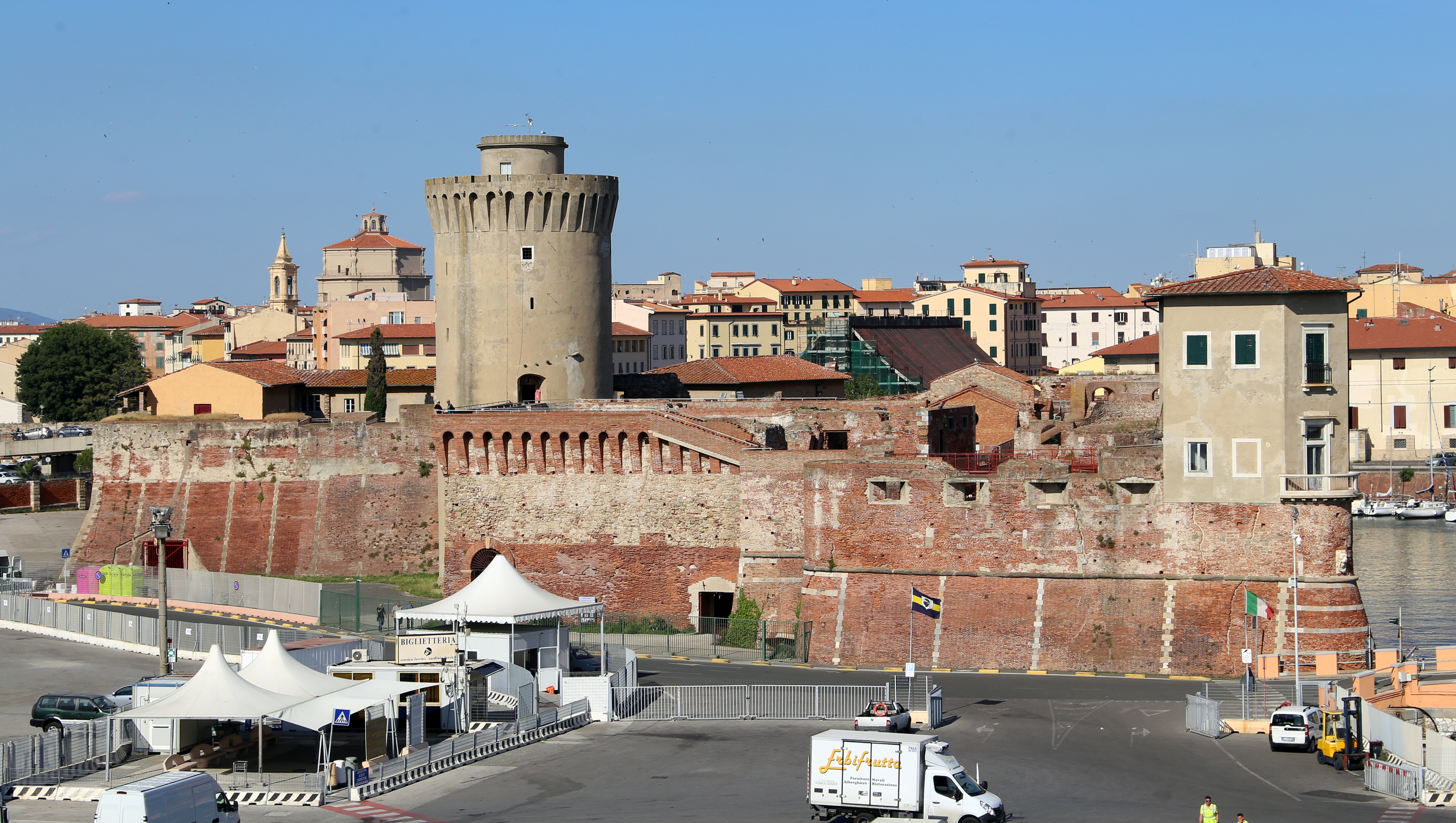
- Panorama of the Old Fortress from the port

Site information
- Owner: Italy

Location
- Coordinates: 43.5519°N 10.3023°E

Site history
- Built: Early 14th century

The Old Fortress of Livorno (Italian: Fortezza Vecchia di Livorno) is a castle in Livorno, Italy. The Old Fortress is a successor building to a medieval fort built by the city of Pisa in the location of an older keep built by Countess Matilda of Tuscany in the 11th century. The 11th-century tower was incorporated inside the fort built by the Pisans. The castle has been described as a "symbol of Medicean Livorno". The fort is located at the Medicean Darsena, or old dock of the port of Livorno, built by the Medici family. The ceremony proclaiming Livorno a city took place inside the fortress on 19 March 1606.

== History ==
The plans to build the castle started in 1519, and the structure was completed under the rule of Alessandro de' Medici in 1534. According to one source, the castle was built between 1521 and 1534 by Antonio da Sangallo the Elder. Antonio da Sangallo the Younger is also reported by another source as the builder. The fortress contains the remains of the older fort built by Pisa and the 11th-century tower constructed by Matilda. Matilda's tower, known in Italian as Mastio di Matilde, or Mastio della Contessa Matilde, has been restored.

The castle built by the Pisans in 1377 is called Quadratura dei Pisani and is believed to have been built by Puccio di Landuccio. The fortress church is dedicated to San Francesco. The old castle also contains the ruins of an ancient Roman castrum. The old fortress has three bastions and two main gates. The bastion closest to the land is called Ampolletta, the bastion nearest to the port is the Canaviglia and the third bastion, the Capitana, is at the northeastern side of the fort.

On 24 April 1589, Christine of Lorraine arrived in Livorno from the sea as part of the celebrations of her wedding to Ferdinand I of Tuscany and came ashore landing at Fortezza Vecchia through the use of a drawbridge. On 19 March 1606 Ferdinando I proclaimed Livorno a "city" in a ceremony which took place inside the fortress. The population of the city at the time was 3,000 inhabitants.

== Fortezza Nuova ==
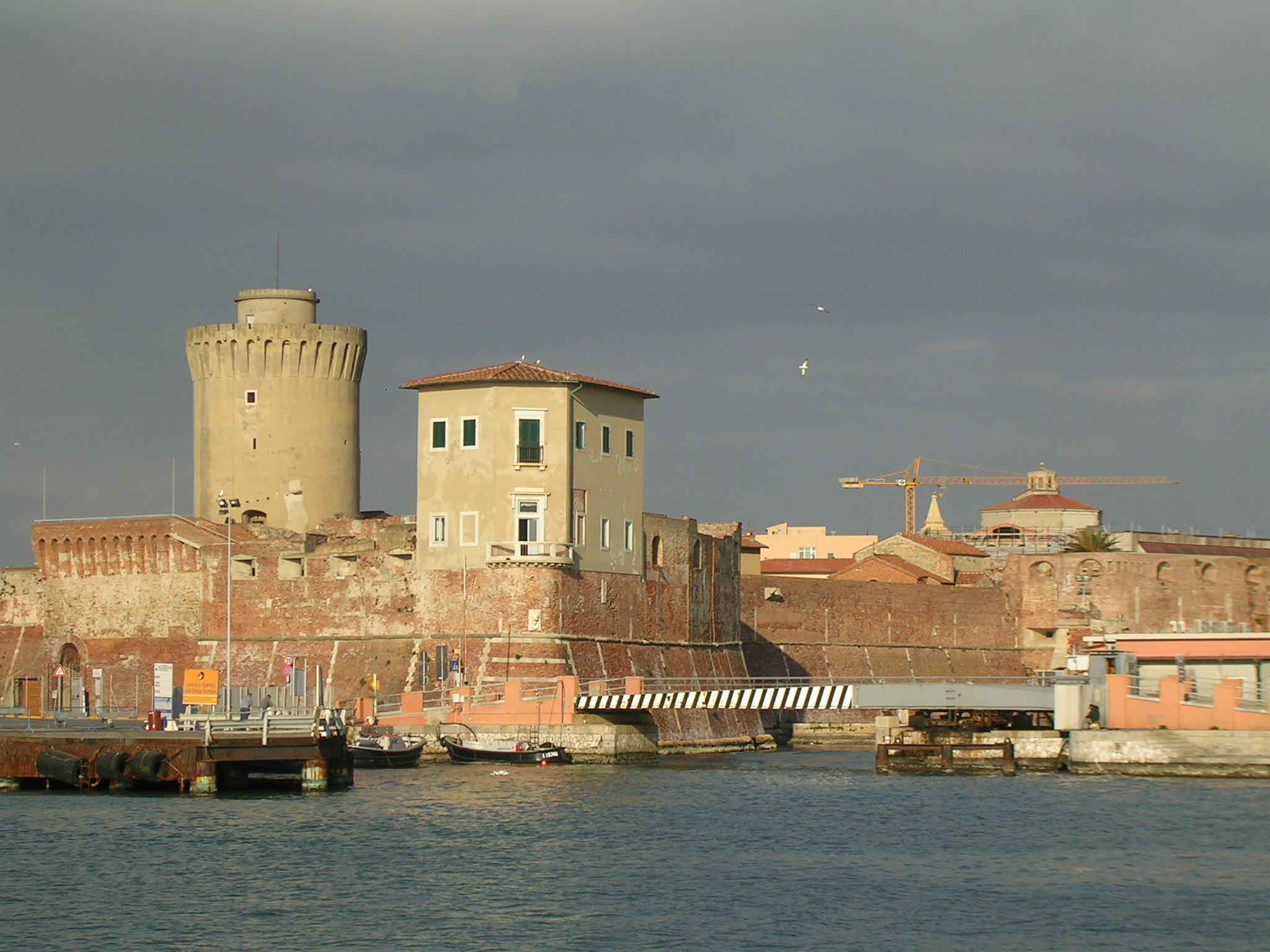
The Caraviglia bastion with the tower of Matilda on the left

Decades after the construction of the old fort, Livorno's fortifications were further enhanced by building a new fortress. The new fortress was named Fortezza Nuova or New Fort. A canal system was built to connect the two forts. The builders of the canals were either Venetian or residents of Livorno. In modern times, boats of the Italian Coast Guard and customs police use a marina located in the main canal between the two forts.

Prior to building a paved bridge to the castle from the mainland, the fort was surrounded by the sea and was accessible via a pontoon bridge. The old fortress is the more significant of the two castles, while Fortezza Nuova has been described as the "larger and more interesting" of the two forts.

In the 19th century the fort became a prison which during the Risorgimento also kept Italian political prisoners including Francesco Domenico Guerrazzi and others. The old fortress sustained extensive damage in World War II but was subsequently repaired following the conflict.

== Scientific experiment ==
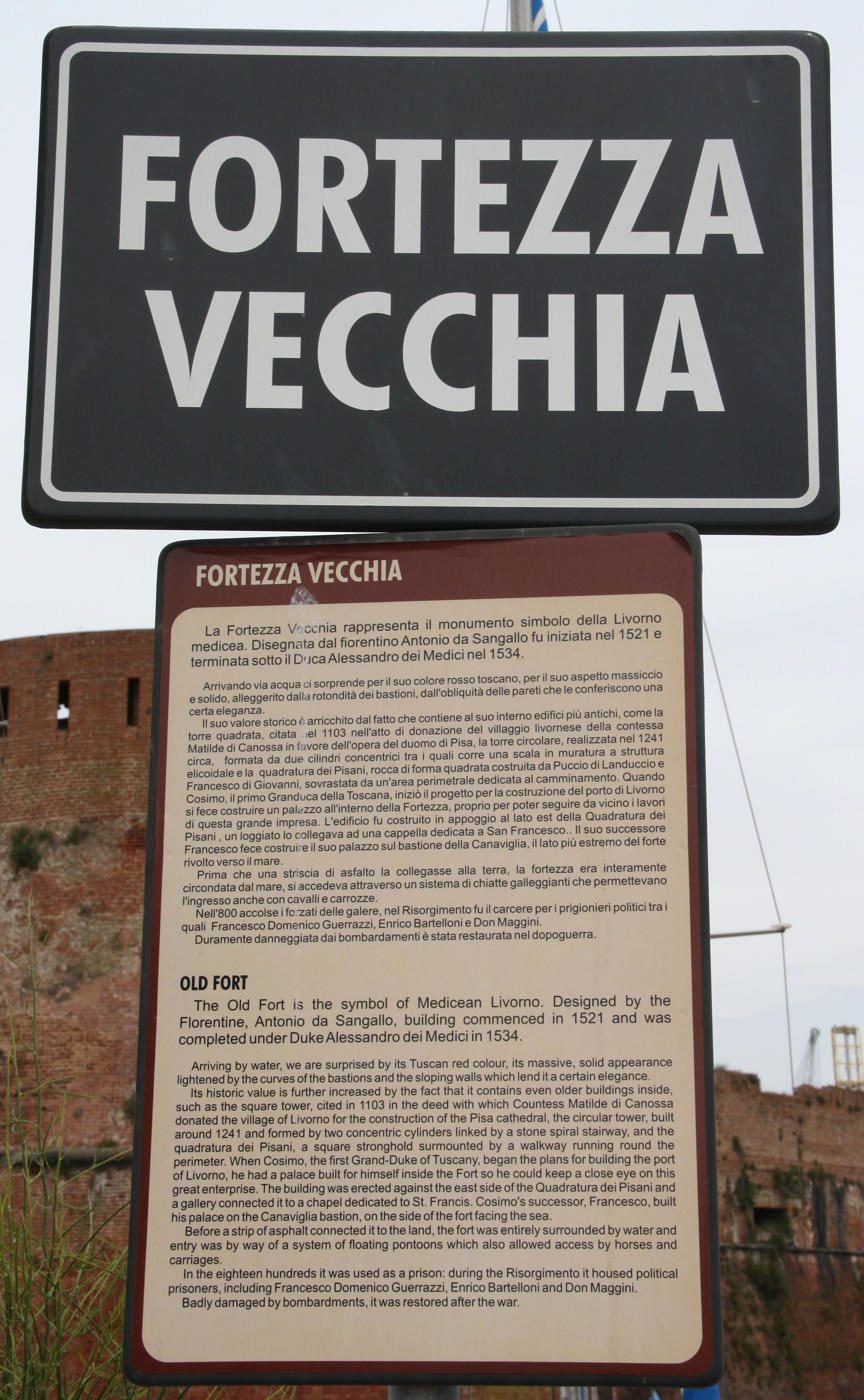
Information notice at the site

On 2 April 1662, an experiment designed to test Galileo's principle of the independence of motions, during projectile motion, was conducted at the old fortress. The experiment was carried out by members of the Accademia del Cimento. The experimental setup included two cannonballs, one used as a projectile from a cannon while the other was vertically suspended. The cannon was placed on Mastio di Matilde, the tower of the old fortress,

To effect the simultaneous initiation of motion for the two cannonballs, one cannonball was fastened to a rope hanging through the muzzle opening of the cannon. When the cannon fired, the projected cannonball broke the suspension rope of the other, and the two cannonballs commenced their motion simultaneously. Due to experimental errors, the results, although close to Galileo's prediction, were deemed inconclusive by the academics.
