= Cesare Maffei =

Italian painter

Cesare Maffei (born 1805) was an Italian painter of the Neoclassical period, active in Tuscany.

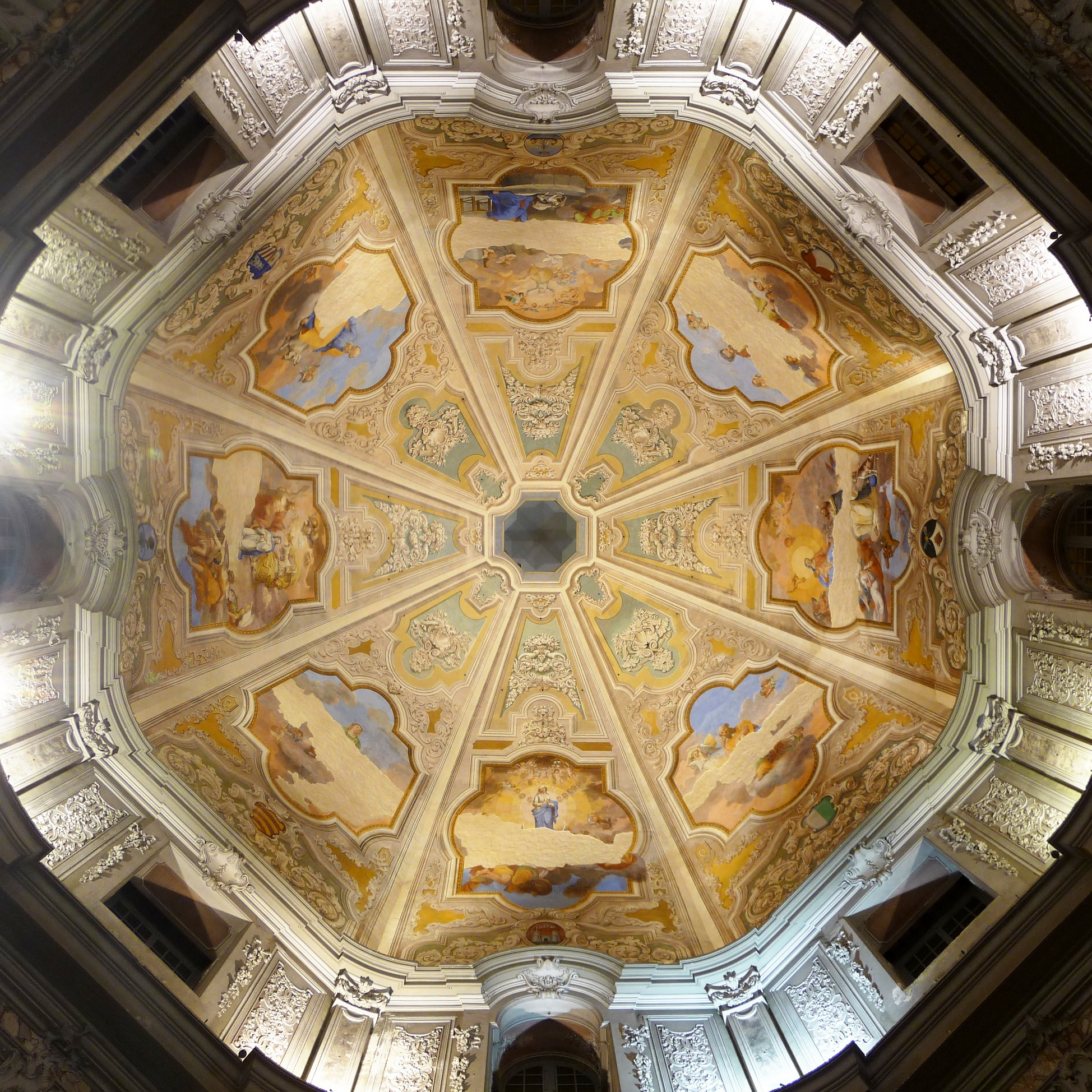
Frescoes in cupola of Santa Caterina, Livorno

== Biography ==
He was the son of an ornamental painter, and his brother Alessandro, was a decorative painter. Cesare studied at the Accademia di Belle Arti di Siena, under Giuseppe Collignon and Francesco Mazzuoli. Between 1836 and 1838, he helped paint frescoes of angel musicians for the church of San Giacomo, Siena. He also painted a cycle of frescoes for the Palazzo Piccolomini-Clementini.

He was a scenographer and decorator for the Teatro Pagliano in Florence, which would become the Teatro Verdi. In 1854, he decorated the tribune of the church of San Regolo in Montaione, depicting the Virgin in Glory with Saints Regolo and Bartholemew.

In 1855, he completed frescoes for the sacristy of the church of Santa Caterina, Livorno. In 1858, he also painted for the Chapel of Larderel in the church of San Matteo in Livorno. Luigi Ademollo commissioned from Maffei the frescoes for the cupola in Santa Caterina, followed by a collaboration with Pietro Calamai, to paint images of the four evangelists, scenes from the life of the Virgin, and St Dominic receives the Rosary. This work was completed in 1876.

== Bibliography ==
- AA.VV., La pittura in Italia. L'Ottocento, Milano 1991.
- A.M. Comanducci, Dizionario illustrato dei pittori e incisori italiani moderni, Milano 1962.
- G. Piombanti, Guida storica ed artistica della città e dei dintorni di Livorno, Livorno 1903.
