= Luigi Ademollo =

Italian painter (1764–1849)

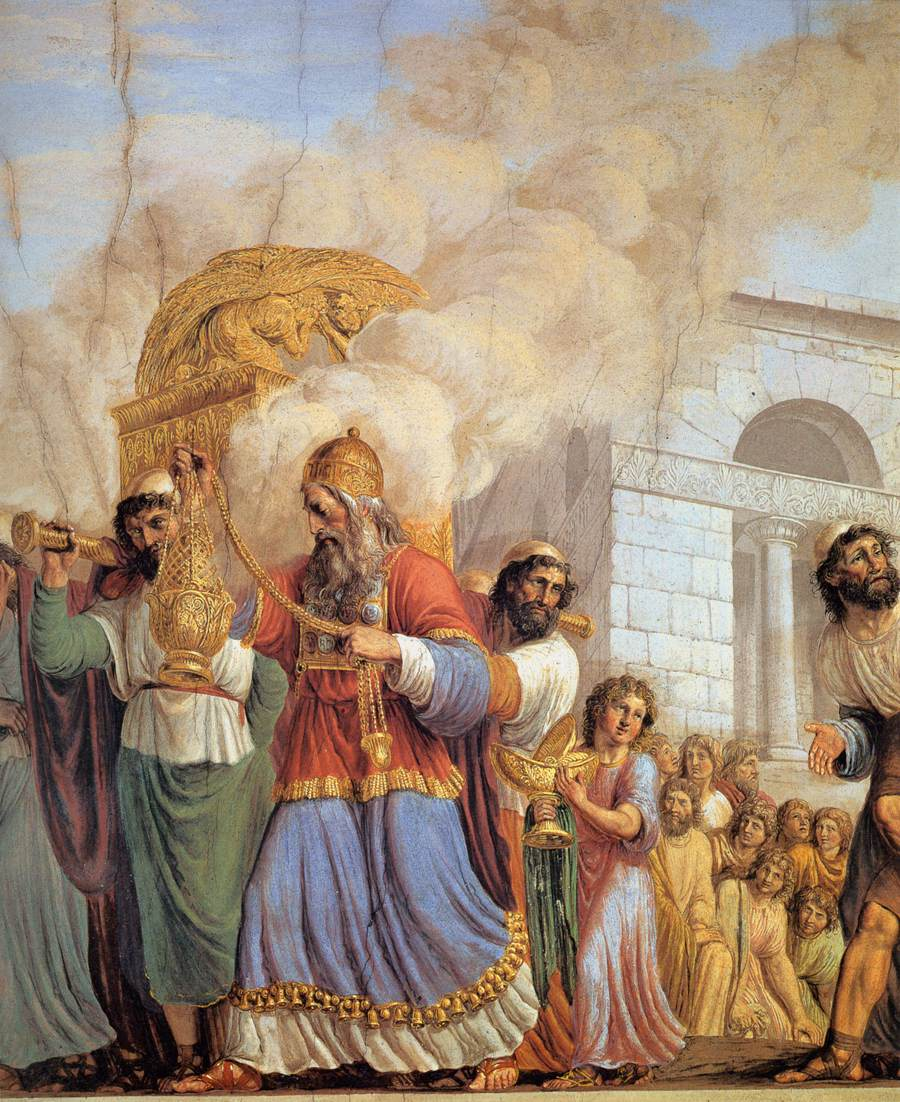
Transportation of the Ark of the Covenant Containing the Tablets of the Law by Luigi Ademollo, Pitti Palace, 1816

Luigi Ademollo (April 30, 1764 – February 11, 1849) was an Italian painter.

== Biography ==
He was born in Milan. He studied at the Brera Academy, where he was taught by Giulio Traballesi, Giocondo Albertolli, and Giuseppe Piermarini. He left Milan in 1783 and traveled and worked in Rome and Florence. He married Margaret Cimballi Ferrara in Rome in 1792 and had several children. Ademollo primarily painted frescoes with biblical scenes from the Old and New Testaments. In 1789 he was appointed professor at the Academy of Fine Arts in Florence. He painted in theaters, including the decoration of sipari (theater curtains).

In Livorno, he executed the neoclassical decorations of the Teatro San Marco. Ademollo was also interested in creating frescoes for the church of Santa Caterina, but his proposal, considered too expensive, was rejected. He did fresco in the Chapel of the Conception in Livorno Cathedral. In the Pisa area he worked in Pomarance, Palaia, and Santa Maria a Monte. In Arezzo he executed frescoes with scenes from the Old and New Testaments, and in the countryside he worked in Lucignano and Monte San Savino: here in the church of the Compagnia del Suffragio he executed in 1821 the pictorial cycle that decorates it, depicting the Deposition from the Cross with the Holy Trinity and angels and Scenes from the New Testament in the side walls and vaults.

He helped fresco the Royal Chapel in the Pitti Palace and also the churches of Santissima Annunziata and Sant'Ambrogio. In Siena, he painted frescoes for the Palazzo Venturi Gallerani and Palazzo Segardi. He died in Florence in 1849.

His son Agostino Ademollo (1799–1841) was a writer of novels, including Marietta di' Ricci. His grandson Carlo Ademollo was a battle scene painter.
