= Palazzo Venturi Gallerani =

Coordinates: 43.3148°N 11.3306°E

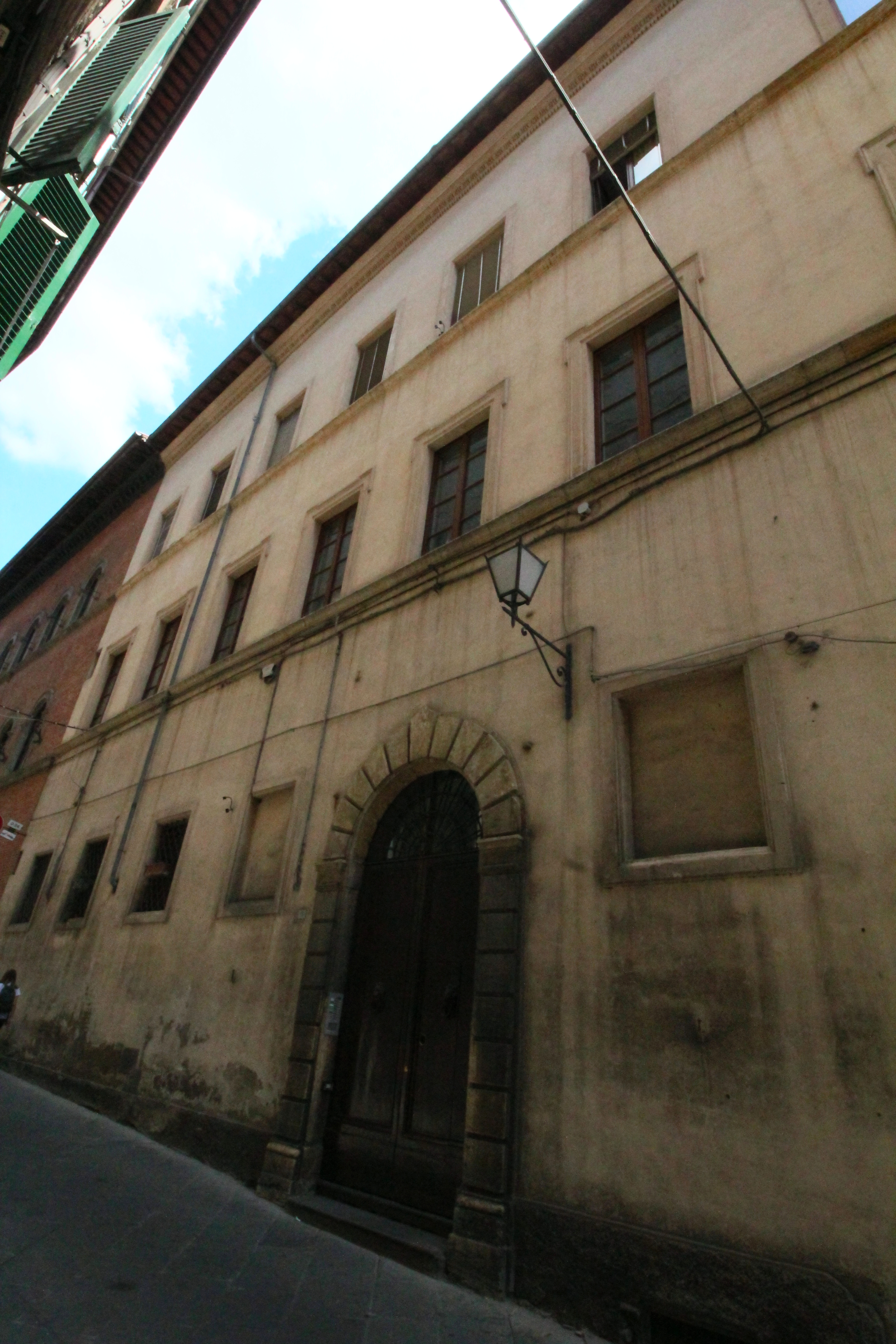
Exterior of the Palazzo Venturi Gallerani

The Palazzo Venturi Gallerani is an 18th-century palace on via delle Cerchia #6, near the Pinacoteca Nazionale in Siena, Tuscany, Italy. The palace is presently occupied by private residences.

The palace was erected in 1790, commissioned by Giuseppe Venturi Gallerani. The Piano Nobile was frescoed during 1793–94 by the neoclassical painter Luigi Ademollo. He painted the Life of the blessed Andrea Gallerani in the chapel. Pope Pius VI stayed here after the Tuscan earthquake of 26 May 1798. Ademollo also painted frescoes in the Palazzo Segardi in the city.
