= Agostino Veracini =

Italian painter

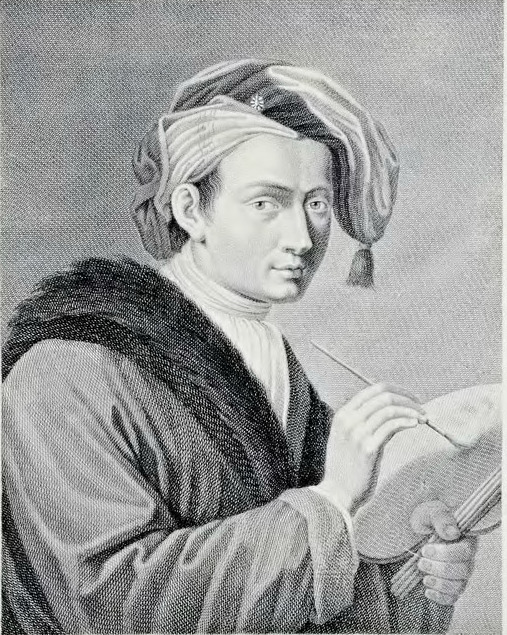
- Born: 14 December 1689; Florence
- Died: 20 February 1762; Florence
- Occupation: Painter
- Father: Benedetto Veracini

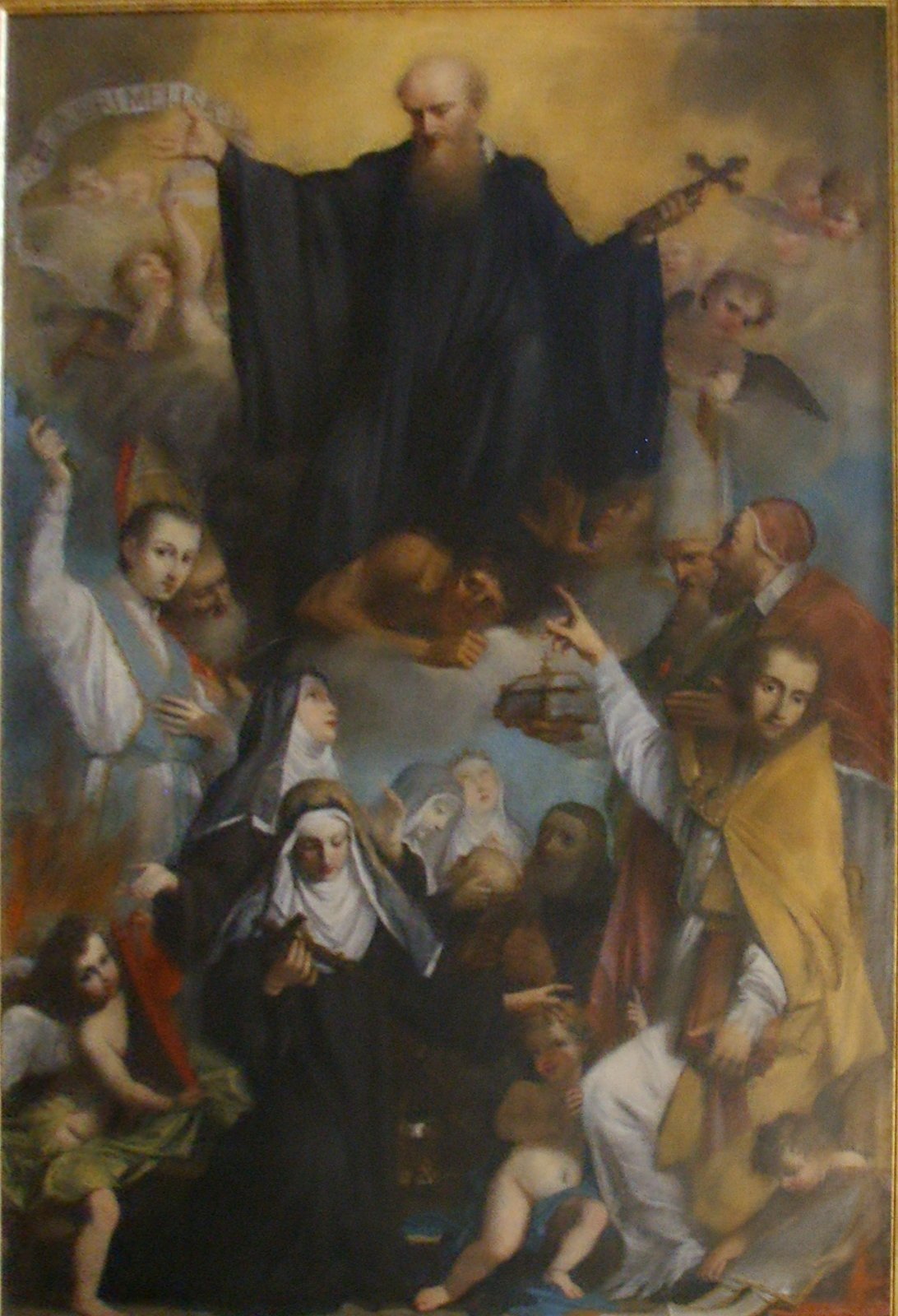
Saint John Gualbert Crushing Simony and Nicolaitism by Agostino Veracini, 1744

(Niccolò) Agostino Veracini (14 December 1689 – 18 February 1762) was an Italian painter and engraver. He was the second son of Benedetto Maria Veracini, also a painter. Agostino was the cousin of Francesco Maria Veracini, the violinist and composer.

Veracini was born and died in Florence. He primarily painted works with religious themes, and executed frescoes and restoration of works of art. He trained Giulio Traballesi.

== Gallery ==
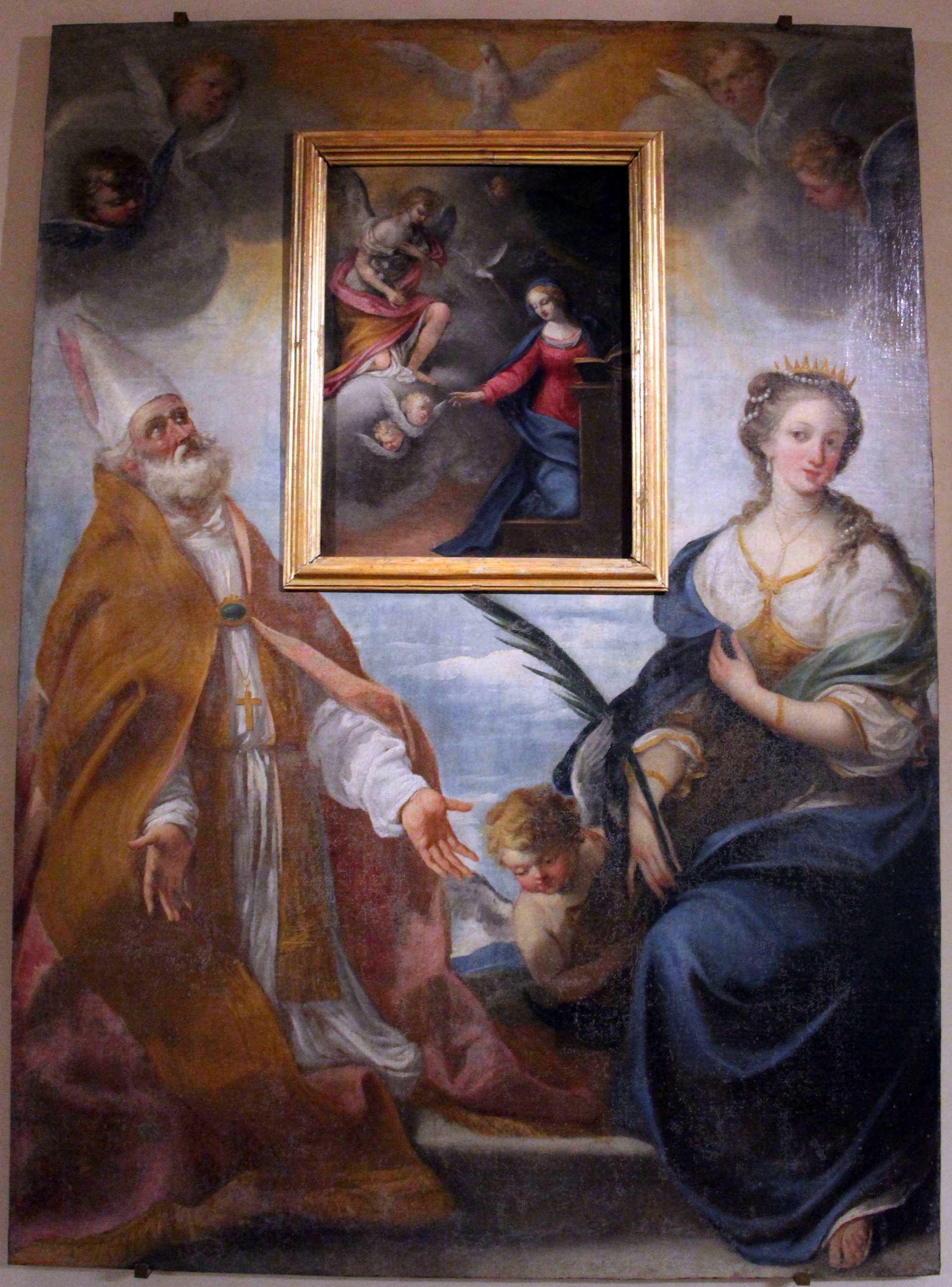
Annunciation amongst Saints Prospero and Catherine

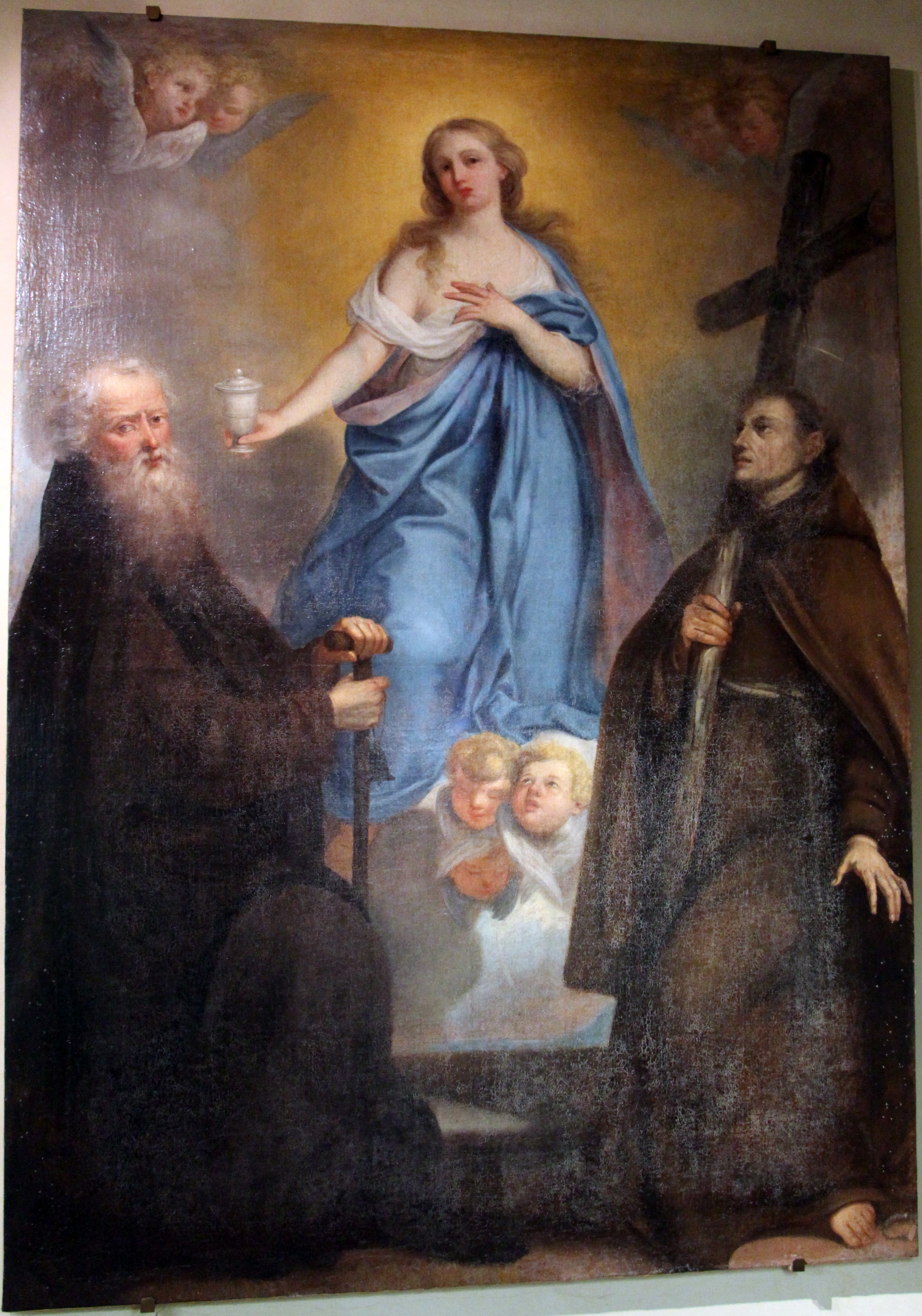
Magdaldene and Saints

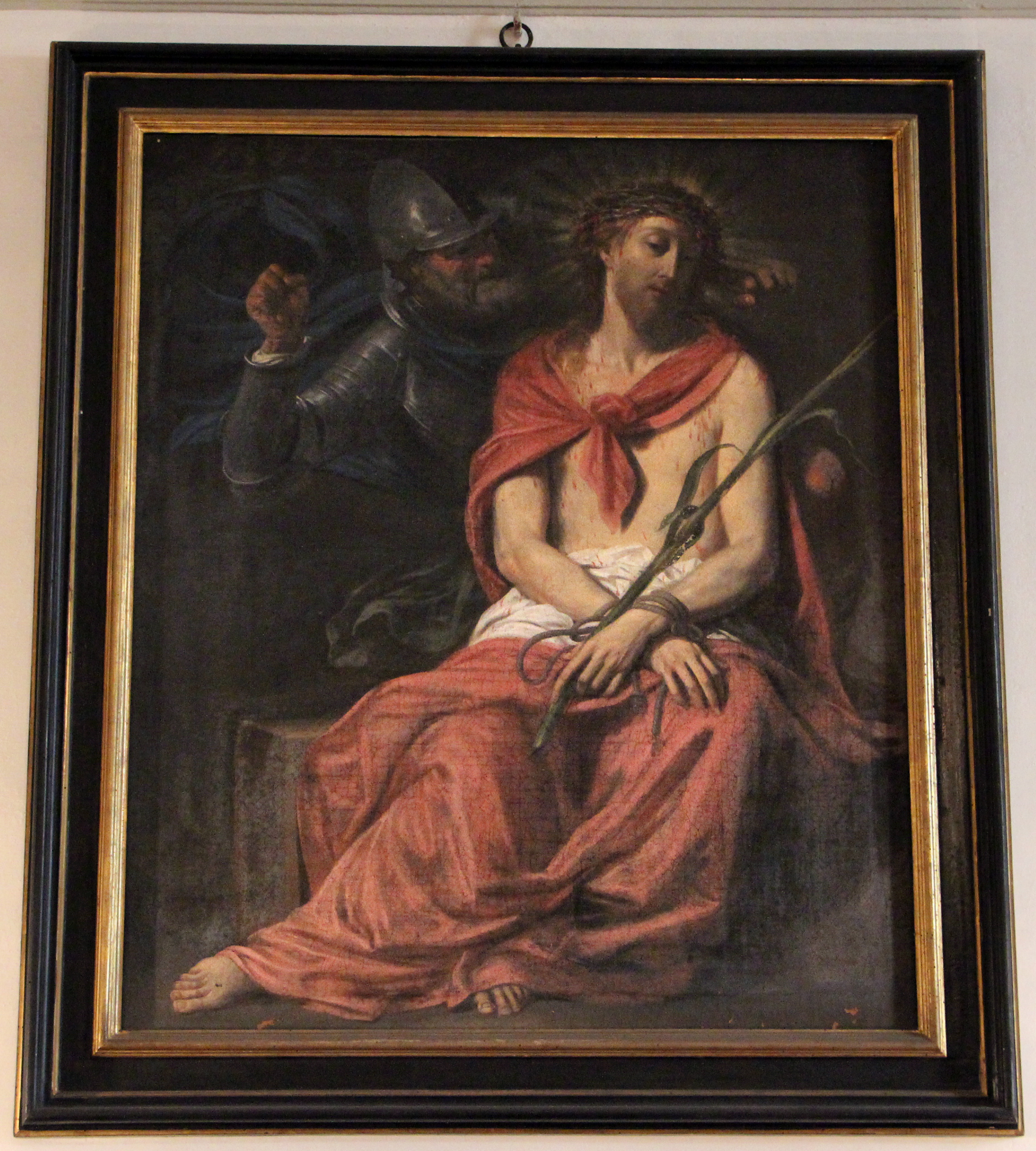
The Mocking of Christ

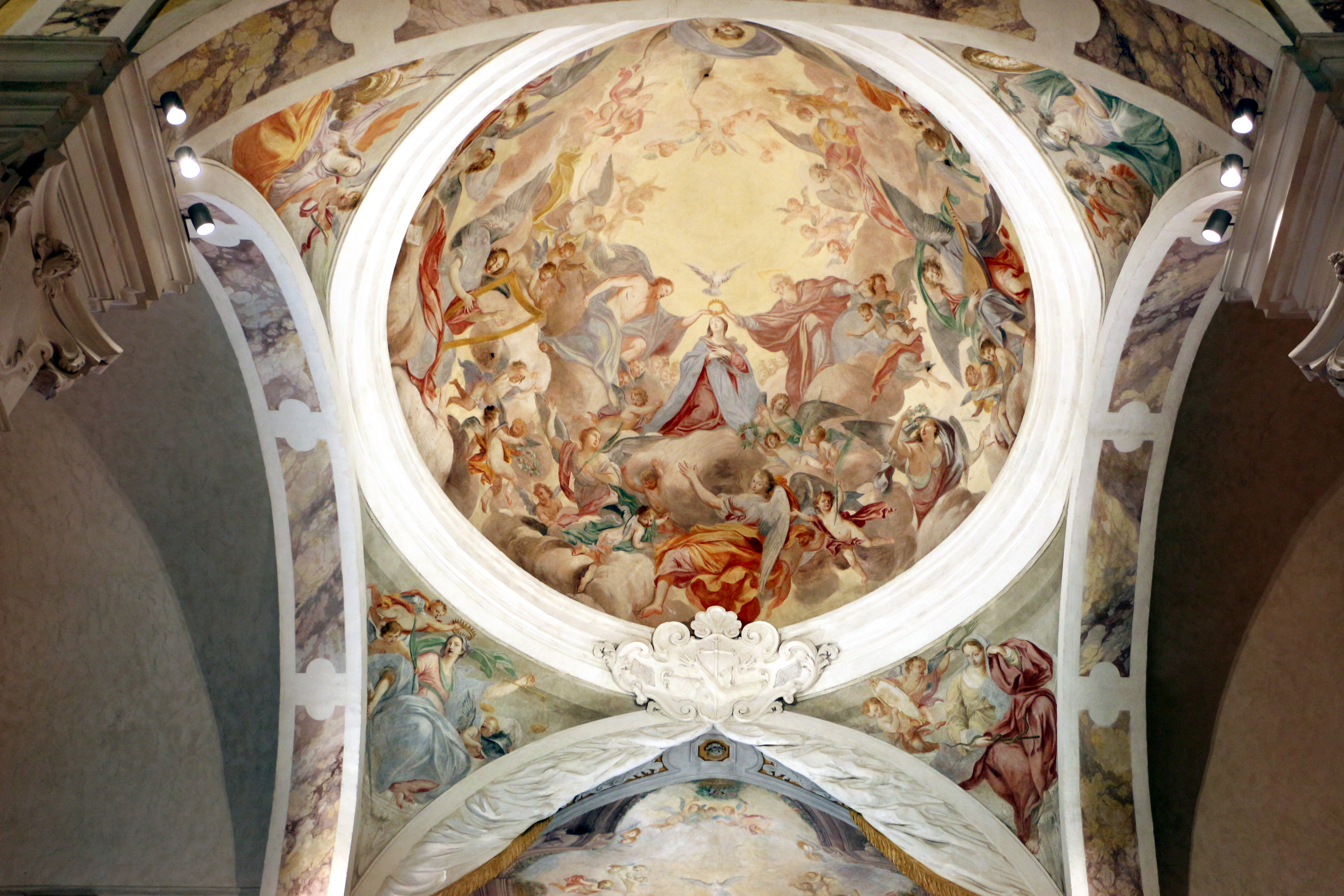
The Coronation of Mary at Chiesa di San Francesco, Castelfiorentino

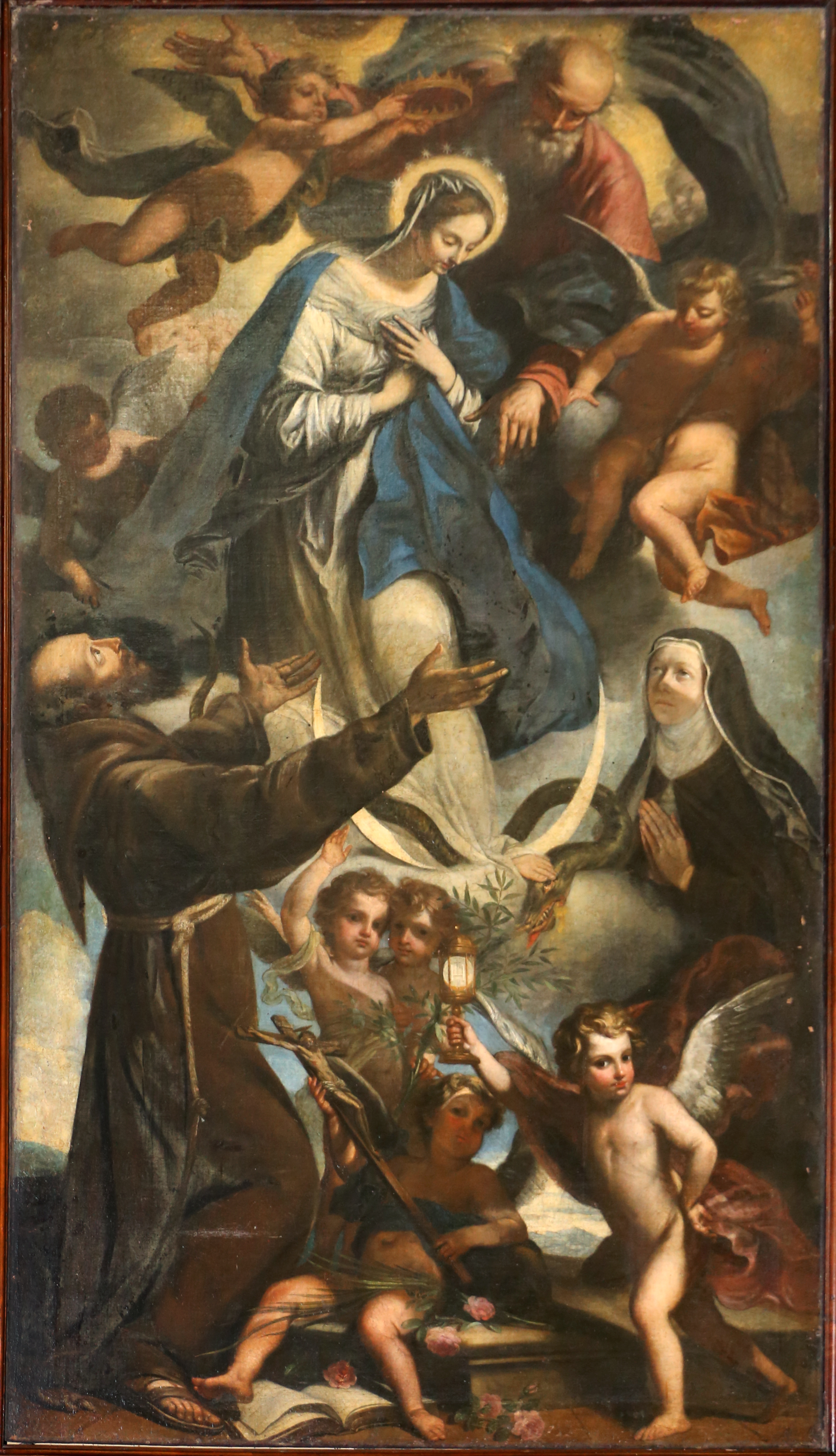
Immaculate Conception between Saints Francis of Assisi and Clare

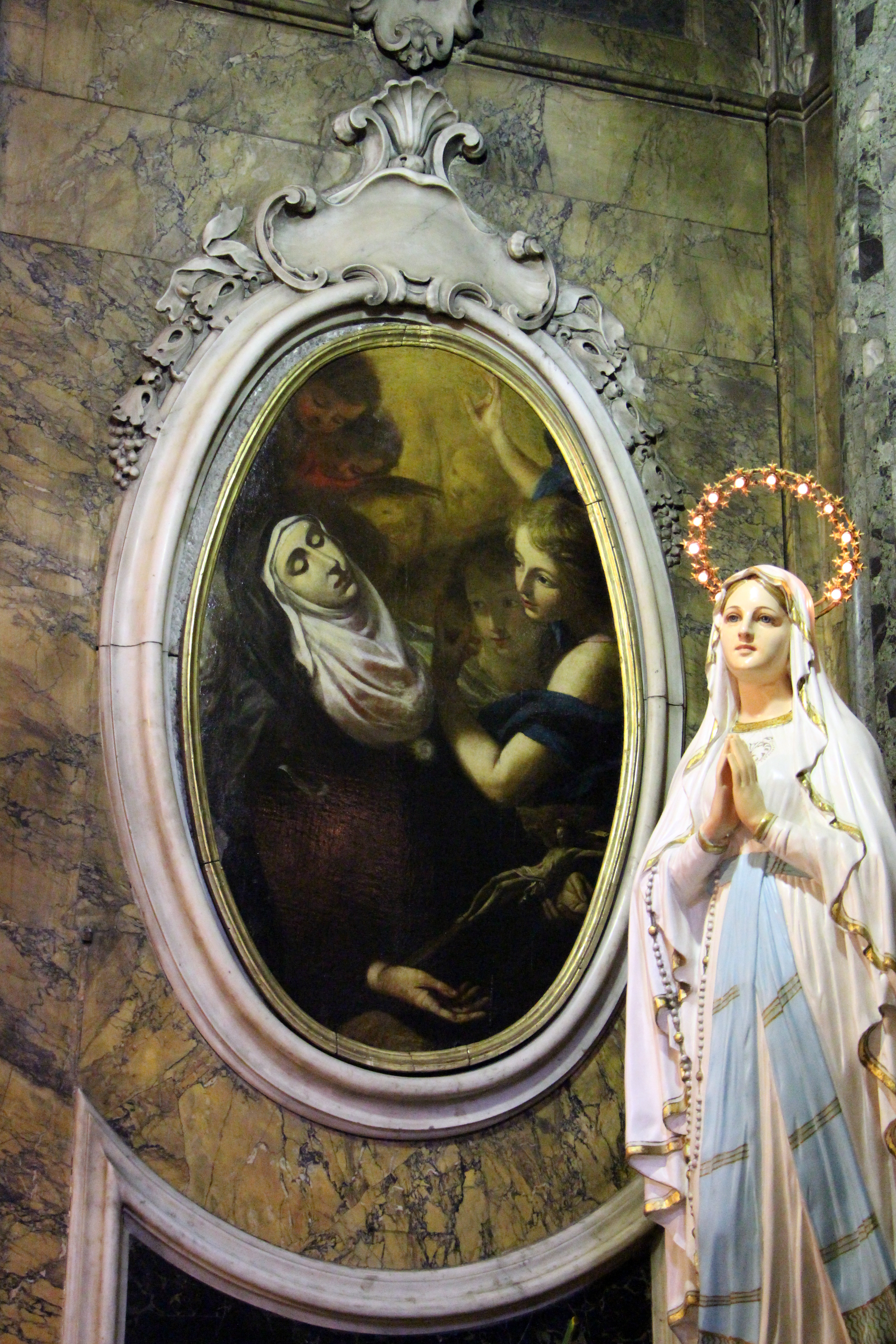
Saint Juliana Falconieri

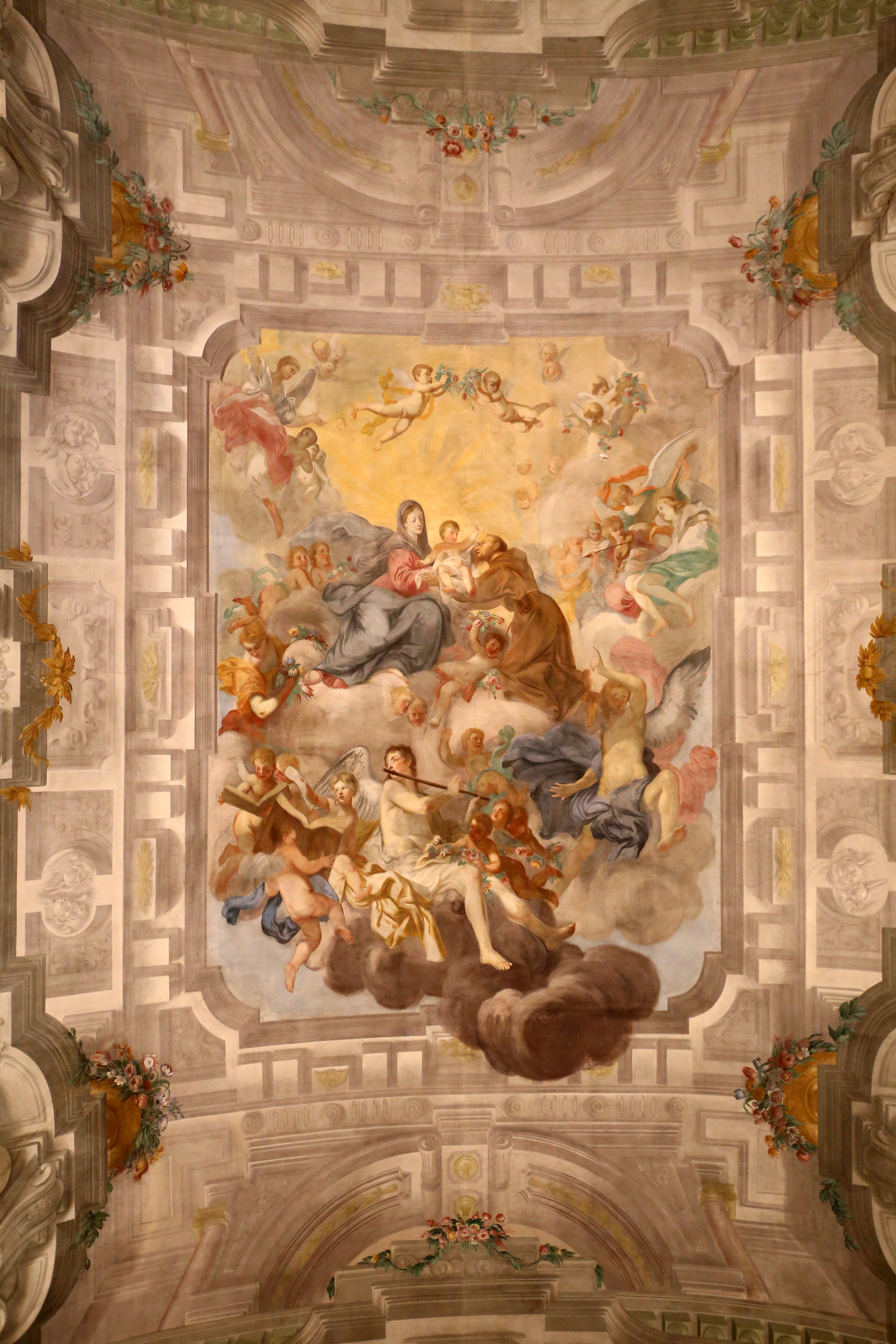
The Virgin offering the Child to Saint Francis
