= Giovanni del Fantasia =

Italian architect and engineer

Giovanni del Fantasia (1670–1743) was an Italian architect and engineer, operating in a Baroque style, mainly in and around Livorno, region of Tuscany, Italy.

He served as Provedditore of the Regia Fabbriche of Livorno.

Among his works in Livorno are:

- Palazzo di Giustizia, Livorno
- Palazzo Comunale, Livorno (1731)
- Santa Caterina, Livorno (1720)
- San Gregorio Illuminatore, Livorno
- Church of Luogo Pio, Livorno
- Work at the Sanctuary of Montenero, Livorno (1720)
- Chapel of the Santissimo Sacramento, Duomo of Livorno
- Church of the orphanage
