= Cristoforo Roncalli =

Italian painter

Cavalier Cristoforo Roncalli
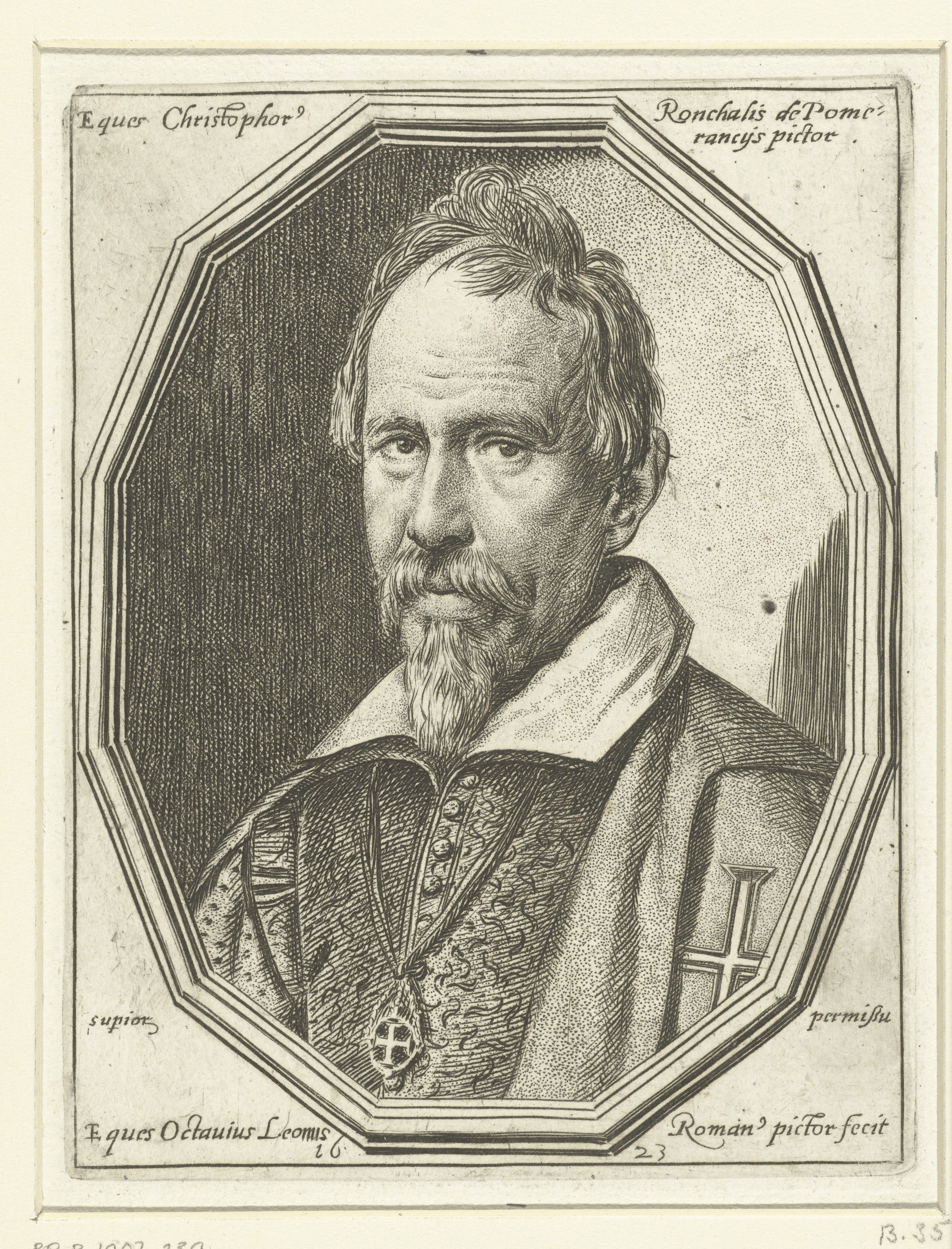
- Engraved portrait by Ottavio Leoni (1623)
- Born: September 8, 1552; Pomarance, Grand Duchy of Tuscany
- Died: 14 May 1626 (aged 73); Rome, Papal States
- Other name: Il Pomarancio
- Known for: Painting
- Movement: Mannerism
- Patrons: Pope Clement VIII

Cristoforo Roncalli (8 September 1552 – 14 May 1626) was an Italian mannerist painter. He was one of the three painters known as Pomarancio or Il Pomarancio.

== Life ==
=== Early life ===
Roncalli was born in Pomarance, a small town near Volterra, to a well-to-do merchant family. He first studied in Florence. By 1575 he had moved to Siena, where Ippolito Agostini commissioned him to paint an altarpiece for the cathedral, a Virgin and Child with St. Anthony and St. Agatha (1576; Siena, Museo dell'Opera del Duomo), and to fresco a ceiling in Agostini’s palace (now Palazzo Bindi Sergardi) with allegories from Ovid’s Metamorphoses. Giulio Mancini (1621) said that Roncalli was associated with Prospero Antichi and suggested the importance of the art of Domenico Beccafumi for the cathedral altarpiece.

=== In Rome ===
Around 1578, Roncalli relocated to Rome, where he was commissioned by the Compagnia di Santa Caterina to paint two scenes from the Life of St. Catherine (Siena, Santuario di Santa Caterina), pictures still indebted to Florentine and Sienese Mannerism. He established his career in Rome with frescoes in the oratory of the Crocefisso at San Marcello al Corso, where he had first collaborated with Niccolò Circignani on part of a cycle of frescoes showing the Discovery and Exaltation of the True Cross. In 1585–6, he frescoed the Mattei and Valli chapels in Santa Maria in Ara Coeli with scenes from the Passion of Christ and scenes from the Life of St. Paul, works that were deeply influenced by a wide variety of Mannerist artists.

In 1588, he became a member of the Accademia di San Luca. He also won the protection and friendship of the Crescentii and through them was introduced to the Oratory of Saint Philip Neri, for whom he painted scenes from the Life of St. Filippo Neri (1596–9; Rome, Santa Maria in Vallicella, chapel of San Filippo Neri). These are distinguished by a new realism and more dramatic contrasts of light and shade.

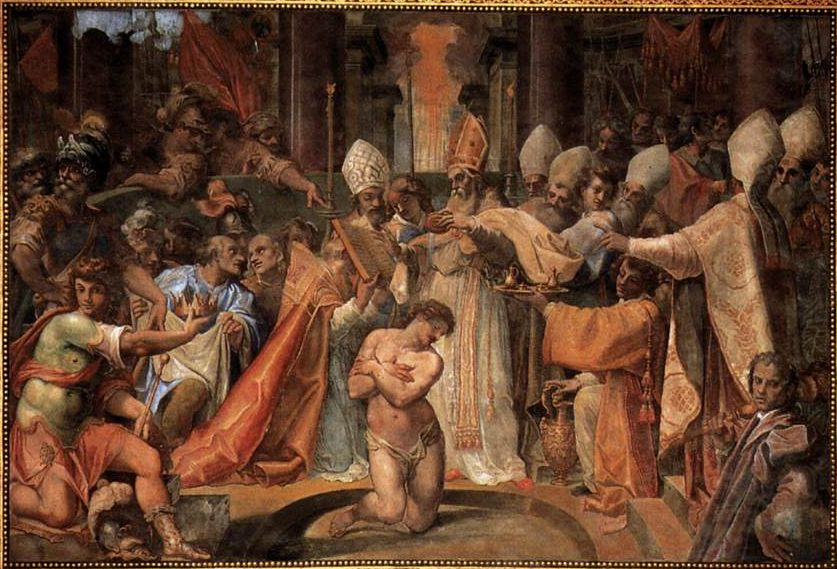
Pope Sylvester baptizes Constantine, Saint John Lateran, Rome

In 1597 Pope Clement VIII, in connection with the Holy Year, embarked on two major public commissions, for the decoration of St. Peter's Basilica and Saint John Lateran. He chose painters trained in the classical traditions of Florentine art, and Roncalli was commissioned to paint the Baptism of Constantine and St. Simon in the transept of San Giovanni in Laterano and to prepare designs for the mosaic decoration in the Clementine Chapel, St Peter’s, where he collaborated with Giuseppe Cesari.

In a perceptive analysis, Mancini described the four dominant schools of early 17th-century painting in Rome: those of Caravaggio and of the Carracci, late Mannerism (represented by the Cavaliere d’Arpino) and a style epitomized by Roncalli, which might be termed eclectic. He cites as examples of two distinct stylistic veins in Roncalli’s art the altarpiece St. Domitilla with St. Nereus and St. Achilleus (1596; Rome, Santi Nereo e Achilleo) and the frescoes in Santa Maria in Ara Coeli: he describes one as ‘more powerful’, the other as ‘pleasing and graceful’.

=== Mature work ===
In the papal commissions, Roncalli moved away from his early Mannerism towards a more classical and monumental style. His mature art drew again on his early experience of Florentine painting and on a deepening knowledge of the work of Raphael and of Michelangelo. Yet at the same time, he absorbed new influences, from Francesco Salviati and Correggio, while retaining an awareness of the art of Federico Zuccari.

In 1605, Roncalli won a commission for a major cycle of frescoes in the new sacristy of the basilica of Santa Maria at Loreto. Bands of gilt stucco divide the ceiling geometrically and frame elegant scenes from the Life of the Virgin, which glow with iridescent colour. In 1606, Roncalli interrupted this work and accompanied Marchese Giustiniani, Marchese Vincenzo on a tour of Germany, Flanders, France and England. In 1609, having finished the frescoes in the sacristy, he was commissioned to fresco the cupola of Santa Maria, Loreto. There is a bozzetto for the vast fresco of the Coronation of the Virgin (Loreto, Basilica della Santa Casa, Bib.) and preparatory drawings (many at Loreto, Basilica della Santa Casa, Bib.).

Many highly accomplished, sculptural drawings in both red and black chalk reveal the meticulous care with which Roncalli prepared his paintings. They include compositional studies, figure drawings, sketches from life, drawings after the Antique and detailed studies of parts of figures. Roncalli was named a Knight of the Supreme Order of Christ in 1607. He died in Rome in 1626. His pupils included Alessandro Casolano, and his son Ilario Casolano.

== Works ==
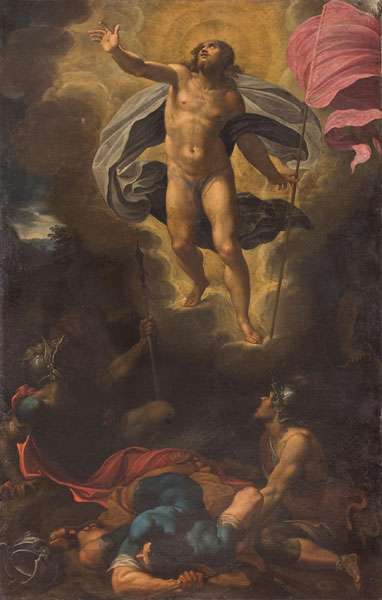
Resurrection of Christ, 1603, priv. col.

- Madonna and Child with Saints Anthony and Agatha (1576), Museo del Duomo, Siena
- Frescoes at Palazzo Agostini (1576), Siena
- Life of St Francis de Paula (c. 1579-84), Trinità dei Monti, Rome
- Metamorphoses, Palazzo Bindi Sergardi, Siena
- Ciclo degli avvenimenti della confraternita del Crocefisso (1583 - 1584), San Marcello al Corso church
- Passion of Christ, (1585 - 1590) Rome, Santa Maria in Aracoeli, Rome
- Life of St Paul (1585 - 1590), Santa Maria in Aracoeli, Rome
- Life of St Philip of Neri (1596 - 1599), Santa Maria in Vallicella, Rome
- St Domitilla with Saints Nereus and Achilles (1599), Santi Nereo e Achilleo, Rome
- Baptism of Constantine the Great (1600), San Giovanni in Laterano, Rome
- Eterno Benedicente, Chapel of the Sacraments, San Giovanni in Laterano, Rome
- St Simon (1599), Santa Maria della Scala, Rome
- Madonna with Child Jesus blessing 123 x 97 cm, 1600 circa, Galleria Nazionale delle Marche, Urbino
- Madonna and Child, St Augustine, St Mary Magdalen and Angels 253 x 166 cm, 1610-1615, Brera Gallery, Milan
- The Presentation of the Temple, Recanati, San Vito church
- Saints Clare and Margaret of Cortona, attributed, Cappuccini Church, Recanati
- Frescoes at Basilica della Santa Casa, Loreto
- Life of the Virgin, (1606-1610) Treasure Hall (Sala del Tesoro), Basilica della Santa Casa, Loreto
- Ceiling of Palazzo Gallo, Osimo, Palazzo Gallo.
- St Joseph frees souls from Purgatory, (attributed) Potenza Picena, communal gallery
- Crucifixion, Potenza Picena, communal gallery
- Madonna della Misericordia, Chiesa della Misericordia, San Severino Marche
- Madonna del Carmelo, (attributed) communal gallery, Corridonia
- Enthroned Madonna with Child and Saints (1595) (communal gallery) Mapello (BG), Carvisi-Cabanetti with Oratorio Maria Annunziata
- Santi Nursini, (early 17th-century) Norcia, Concattedrale di Santa Maria Argentea
- Portrait of Cardinal Antonio Maria Gallo, private collection
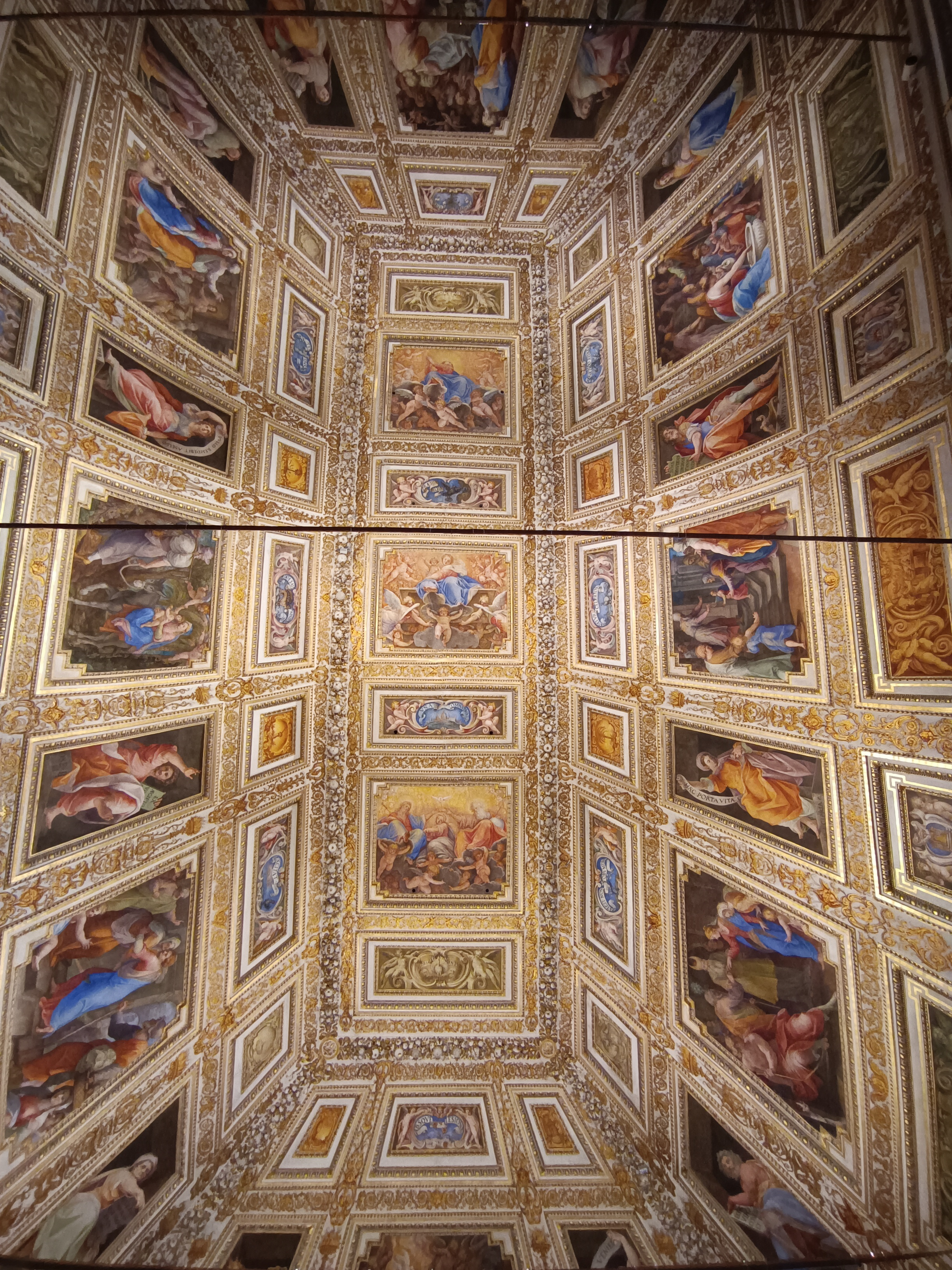
Frescoes at Basilica della Santa Casa, Loreto

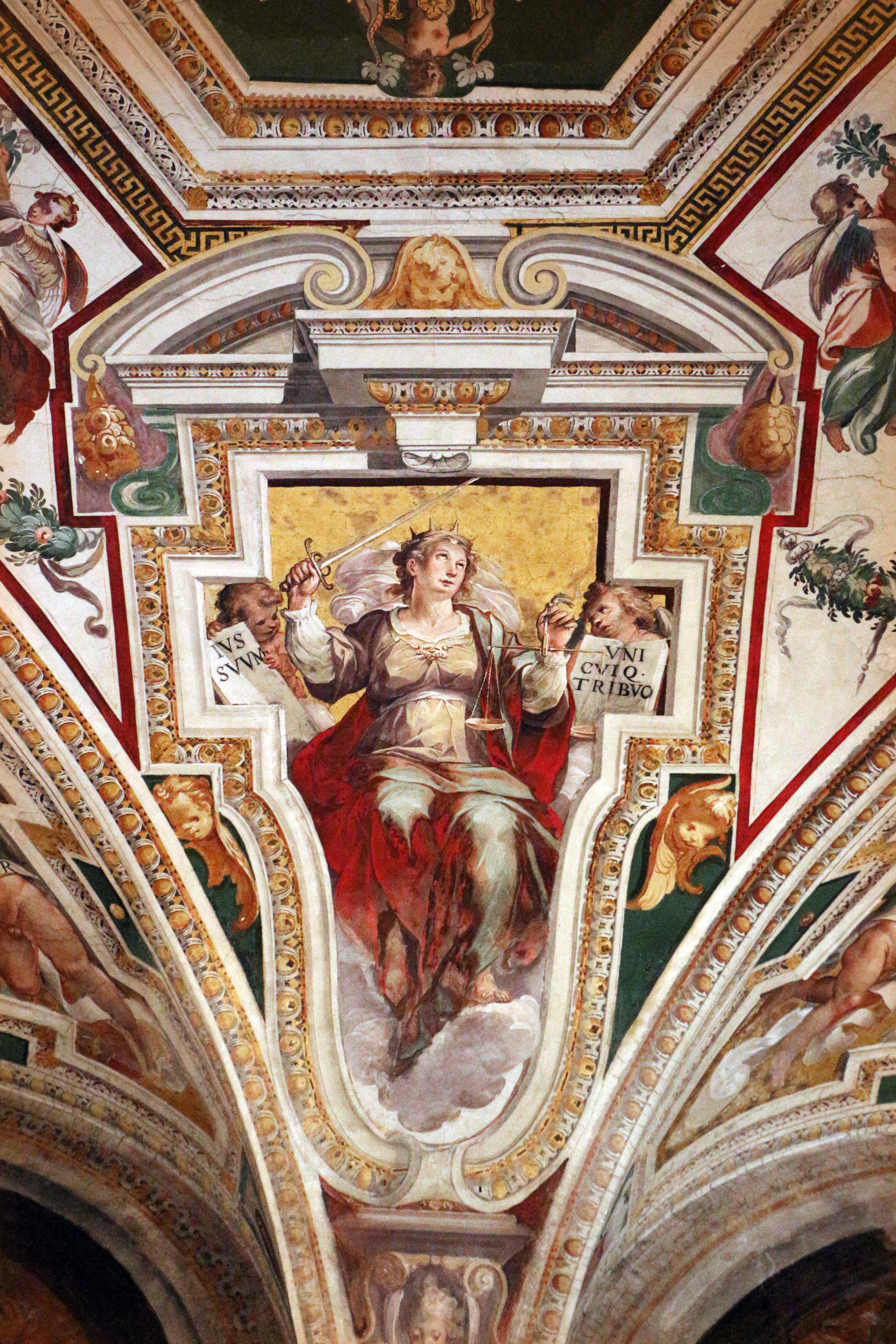
Detail of the fresco cycle of Palazzo Colonna, Rome

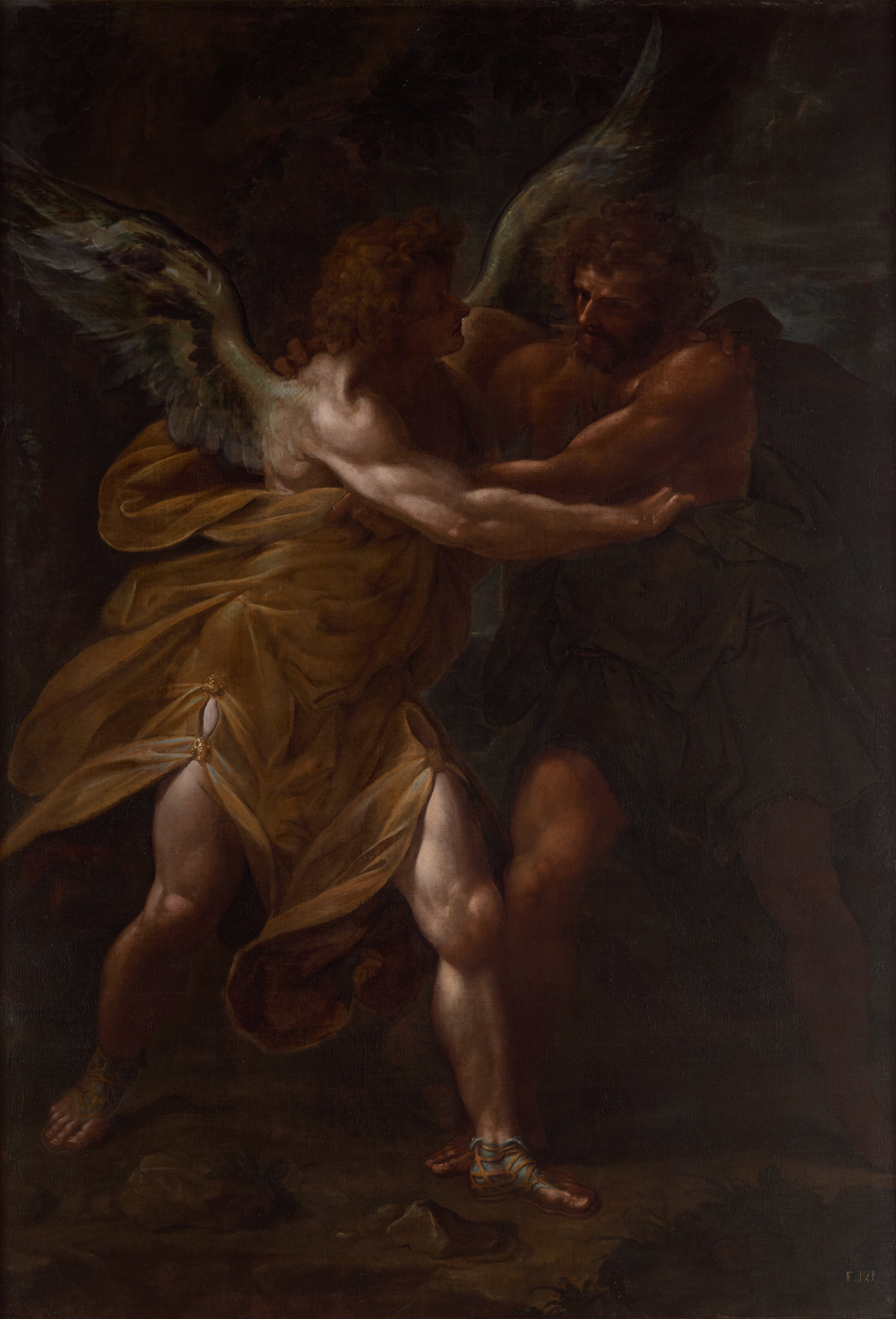
Jacob Wrestling with the Angel, Minneapolis Institute of Art

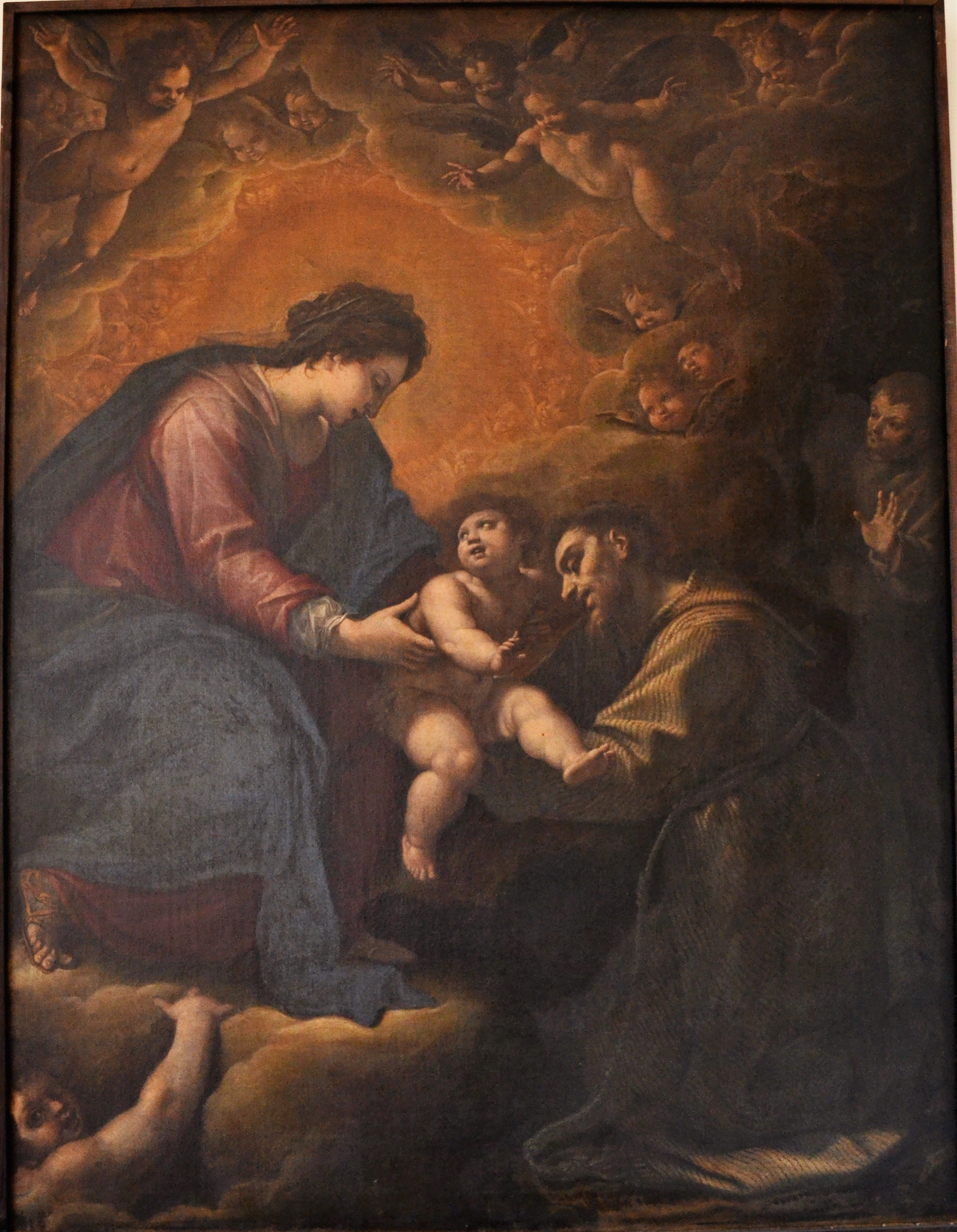
Madonna and Child with Saint Francis, Girolamini, Naples

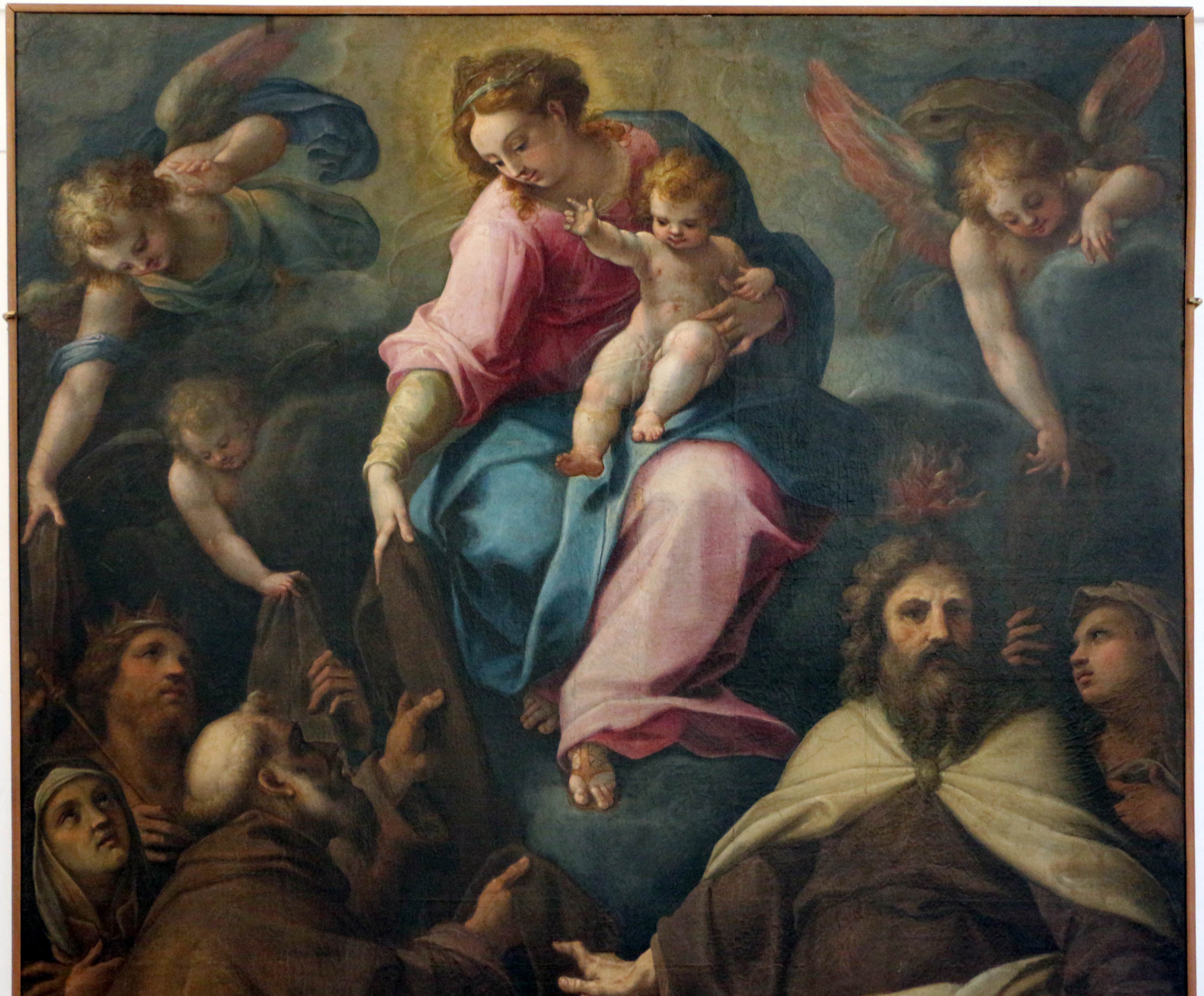
Our Lady of Mount Carmel Delivering the Scapular to Saint Simon Stock, Pinacoteca Parrocchiale, Corridonia

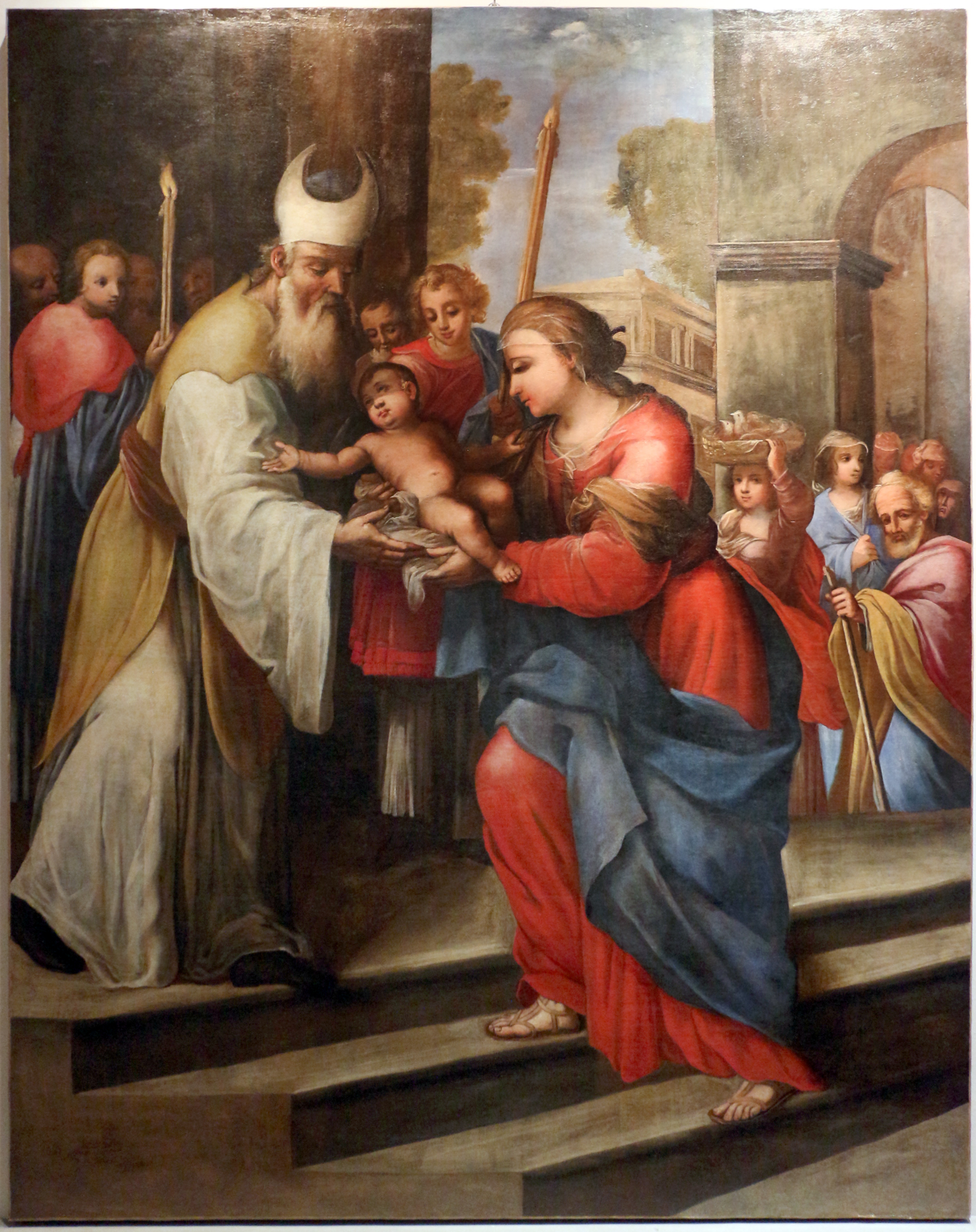
Presentation of Jesus, Pinacoteca Comunale, Recanati

== Bibliography ==
- Vitalini Sacconi, Giuseppe (1985). Macerata e il suo territorio: la Pittura. Macerata: Cassa di Risparmio della Provincia di Macerata.
- Cordella, Romano (1995). Norcia e territorio: guida storico-artistica. Norcia: Una mostra, un restauro.
