= Palazzo Sergardi, Siena =

Coordinates: 43.322808°N 11.328760°E

The Palazzo Sergardi or Sergardi Biringucci is an 18th-century aristocratic palace located on Via Montanini #110 in the city of Siena, region of Tuscany, Italy; the palace is best known for its late 18th century Neoclassical frescoes by Luigi Ademollo.

== History ==
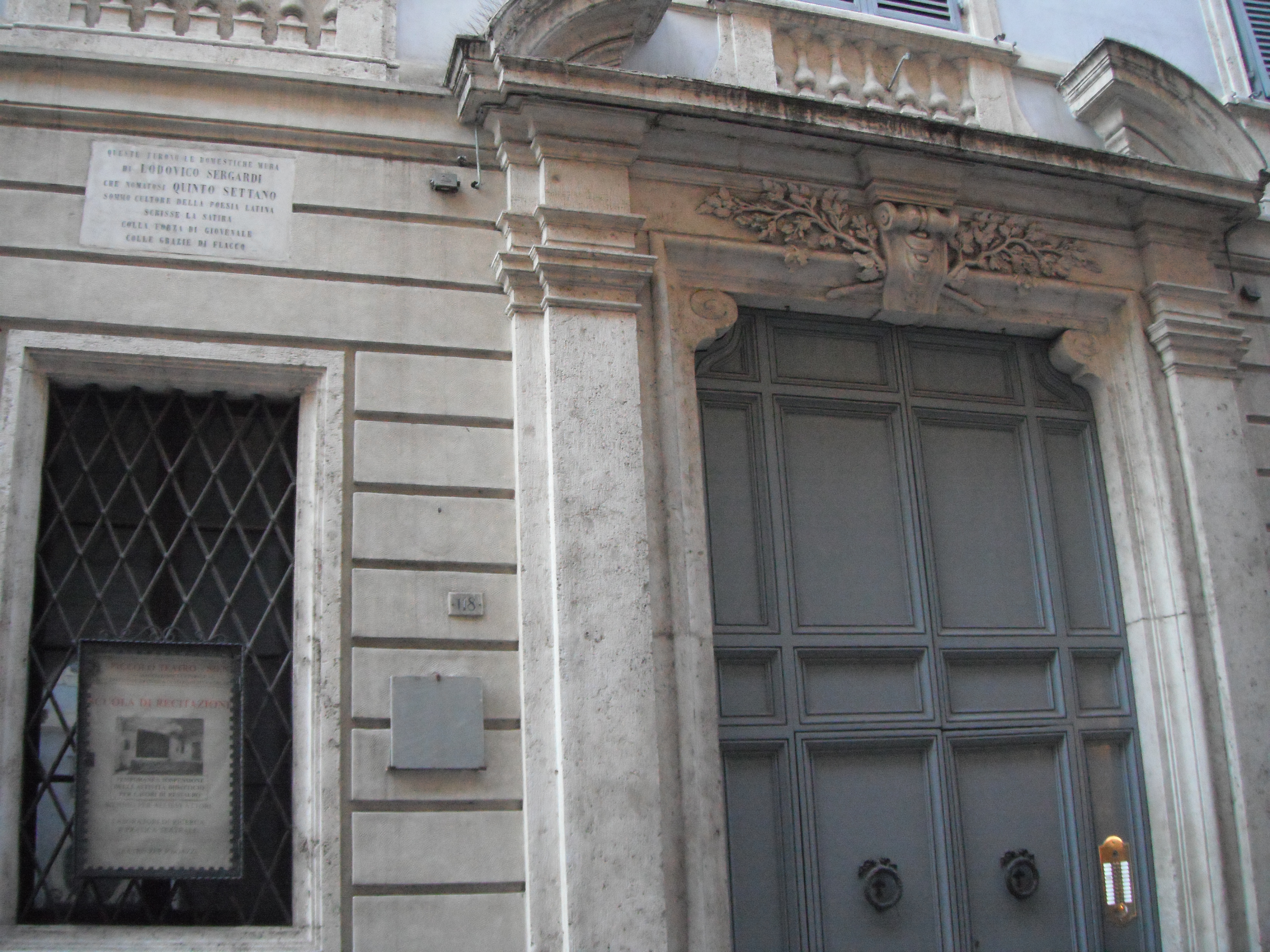
Plaque near entrance portal

The site once held a convent of the Derelitte, and various buildings were joined to construct this palace. In 1744, Fabio Sergardi commissioned a designs in a late Baroque, early Neoclassical style from the architect Paolo Posi. Posi also designed the Palazzo De Vecchi in Siena.

For this palace, the entrance portal has a broken pediment. The ground floor has a small theater. In addition various rooms contain frescoes depicting the Rape of the Sabines; Apollo; and The Marriage of Bacchus and Ariadne, painted by Ademollo in 1794–1795.

Two other palaces in Siena are linked to the Sergardi family are the palazzo Palazzo Fineschi Sergardi and Palazzo Bindi Sergardi.
