= Santa Caterina da Siena, Livorno =

Church building in Livorno, Italy

Coordinates: 43°33′18″N 10°18′30″E

Santa Caterina da Siena is a Baroque architecture, Roman Catholic church in the district Venezia Nuova central Livorno, region of Tuscany, Italy. It stands in front of the Piazza dei Domenicani. The church is notable for its tall octagonal dome and lantern rising above a rough, unfinished rectangular base.

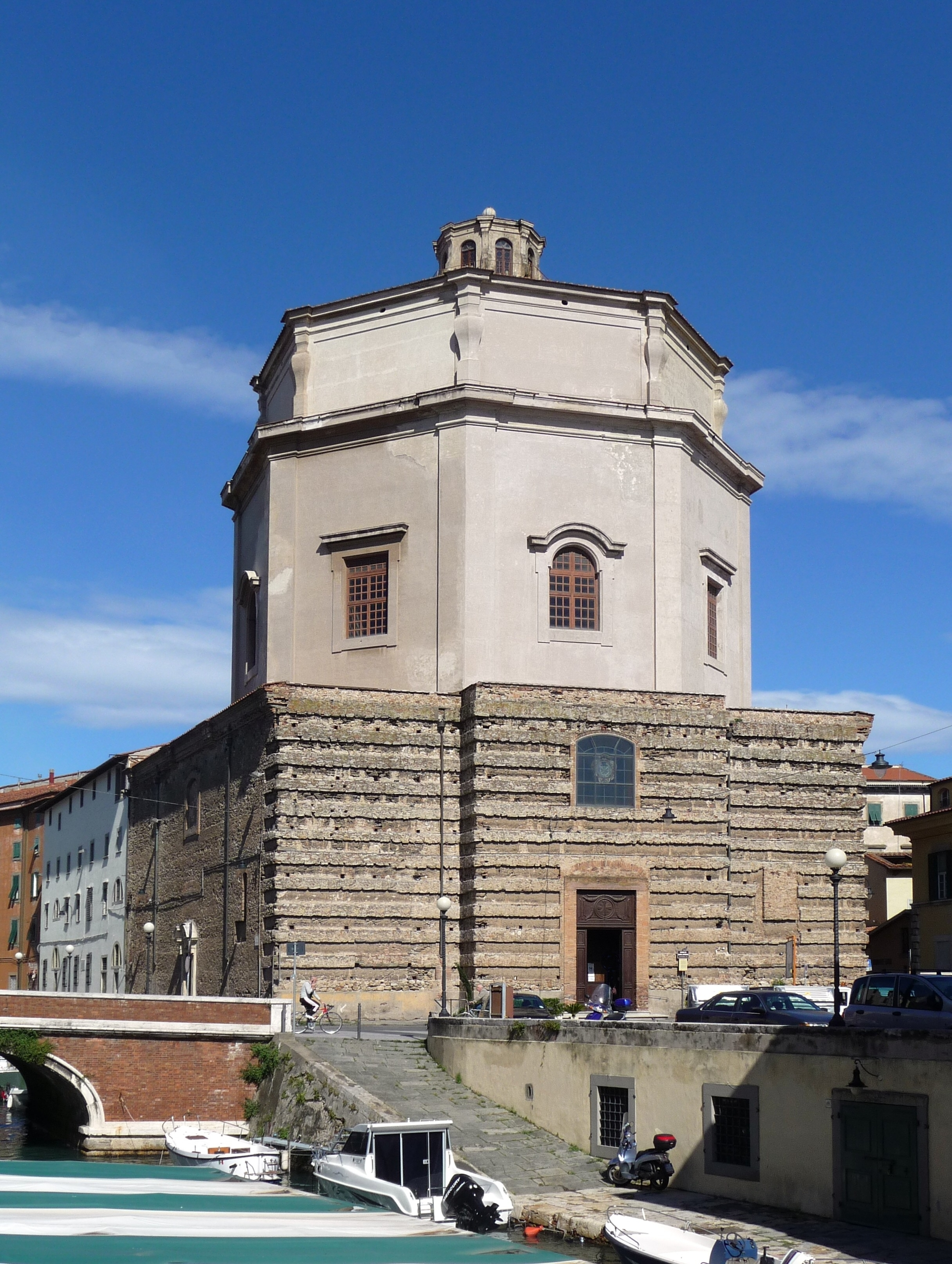
Santa Caterina with octagona dome and unfinished facade.

== History ==
The church was commissioned by the Dominican order and dedicated to St Catherine of Siena. A sumptuous church, modelled after the Pantheon of Rome was designed originally by Giovanni Del Fantasia; however, after construction began in 1720, progress was slow and interrupted, and thus a new design was ordered in 1729 from Alessandro Saller, then Giovanni Masini, and finally Giuseppe Ruggieri. While the church was consecrated finally in 1753, the facade still remains unfinished. The lantern tower was completed in 1869 by Dario Giacomelli. The dome rises 63 meters to the lantern. Interior decoration, including the frescoes of the Evangelists in the cupola, were added in the 19th century by Cesare Maffei. Other paintings depict St Dominic receives the Rosary and Three Mysteries of the Madonna. In 1785, the Dominican order was suppressed in Tuscany, and the church was granted to the Confraternity of Saints Cosmas and Damian. In 1808, Napoleonic forces suppressed the church and converted it into a prison. It was reconsecrated in 1822 and reverted to Dominicans control only in 1871.

Above the main door is a canvas depicting the Coronation of Mary by Giorgio Vasari. That painting was once in the Vatican and only acquired for the church in the 19th century. The large chapel, to the right of the entrance, is dedicated to St Catherine of Siena, and houses a wooden statue of the saint carved by Cesare Tarrini, and frescoes depicting the Glory of St Thomas Acquinas by Giuseppe Maria Terreni. Tarrini also completed the nativity scene (presepe) in the left Chapel of the Holy Sacrament (SS. Sacramento).

To the left of the entrance, is the Chapel of Saint Joseph with paintings by the brothers Jacopo and Antonio Terreni; the main altarpiece is a Holy Family by the school of Passignano. In 1748, the main altar of the church was designed by Bartolommeo Cassarmi and frescoed by Giulio Traballesi. It is flanked by canvases by Lorenzo Grottanelli, depicting St Catherine exhorts Gregory XI to return to Rome, and a Procession in Siena dedicated to St Catherine. A nearby altar has a painting of the Madonna of the Rosary above Purgatory by an unknown Florentine painter. The frescoes lateral to the altar, depict St Pius V praying for Victory in Lepanto and St Dominic receives the Rosary. This chapel contains a nativity (presepio) scene. The last chapel initially was dedicated to St Vincent Ferrer but has since changed hands various times.
