= Livorno Courthouse =

Judiciary building in Livorno, Italy

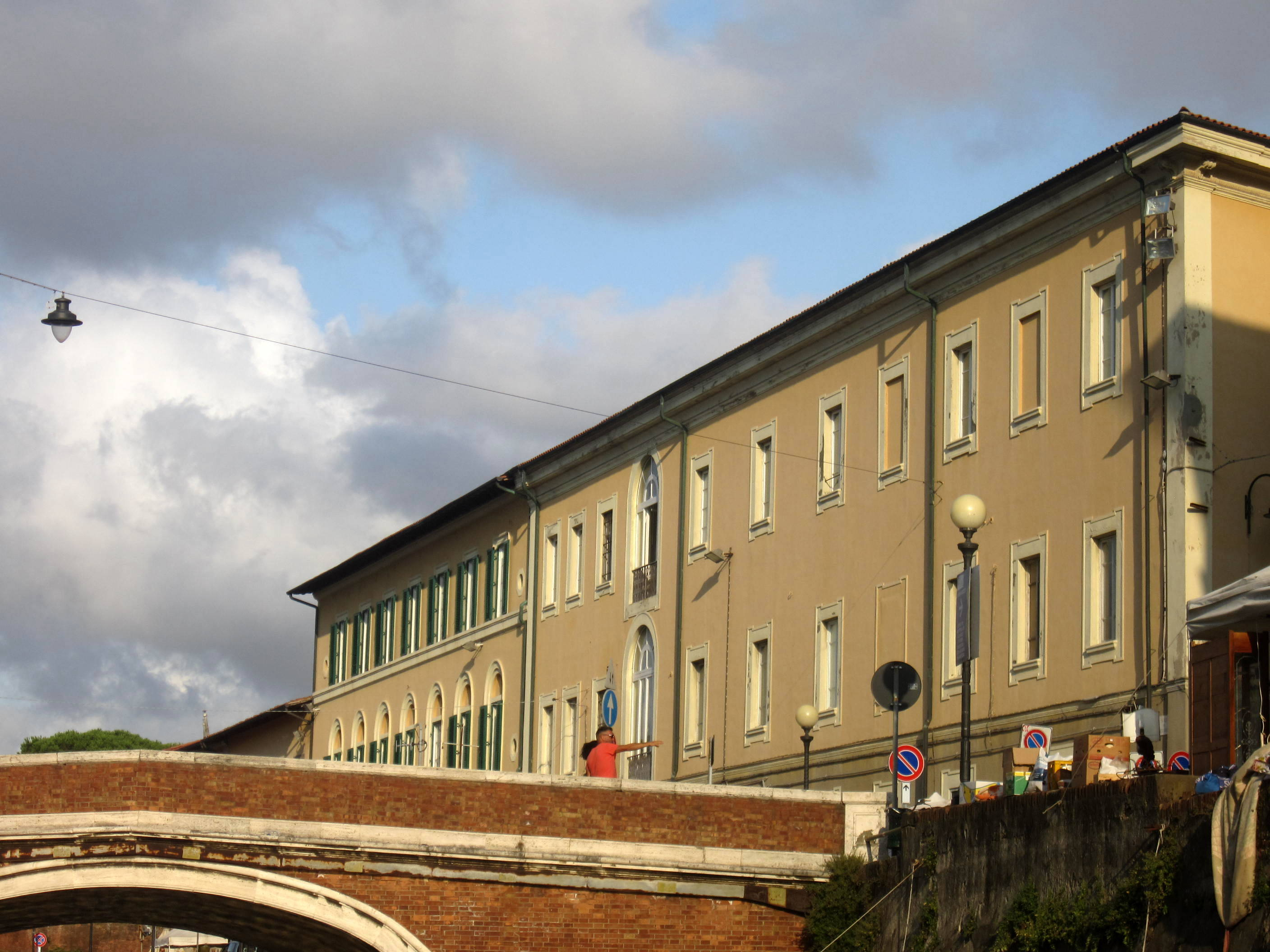
- Interactive map of the Livorno Courthouse area

General information
- Location: Livorno, Tuscany, Italy
- Coordinates: 43°33′15″N 10°18′32.44″E
- Construction started: 1697
- Completed: 1880

Design and construction
- Architect: Giovanni del Fantasia

The Livorno Courthouse (Italian: Palazzo di Giustizia di Livorno, lit. 'Palace of Justice of Livorno') is a judicial complex located in the Venezia Nuova neighborhood of Livorno, Italy.

== History ==
The building dates back to the late 17th century, originally constructed for a female religious order but entrusted to the Jesuits by the will of Grand Duke Cosimo III de' Medici. It was completed in 1707 by the architect Giovanni del Fantasia and also included a church dedicated to St. Francis Xavier. Subsequent expansions were carried out under the auspices of the Grand Duke. Following the suppression of the Jesuits in the 1770s, the structure was repurposed into a hospital for women managed by the Oblate nuns, and later served various functions, including hosting gala events in 1783. With the establishment of the Diocese of Livorno in 1806, part of the building became the episcopal residence.

Between 1811 and 1856, it housed the Paradisino Institute for girls. From 1816 to 1836, the church was utilized by the Anglican community. In 1857, the complex became the seat of the Livorno Court, which had previously been located in the Palazzo Bartolommei. Major renovations and expansions took place in 1880, attributed to Arturo Conti, with further renovation work carried out in 1916.

== Sources ==
- I. Monterisi (1992). "In margine alle cronache del Vigo sul tribunale di Livorno: l'acquisto dell'Episcopio e l'attribuzione del progetto della Corte d'Assise all'architetto Arturo Conti". Studi livornesi. No. VII. pp. 167–172.
- G. Piombanti (1903). Guida storica ed artistica della città e dei dintorni di Livorno. Livorno. p. 248.
- P. Vigo (1917). Il Palazzo di Giustizia in Livorno e le sue vicende. Livorno.
- S. Villani (2013). "Protestanti a Livorno nella prima età moderna". Protestanten zwischen Venedig und Rom in der Frühen Neuzeit. Berlin. p. 137.
