= San Gregorio Illuminatore, Livorno =

Historical Italian Armenian Catholic church

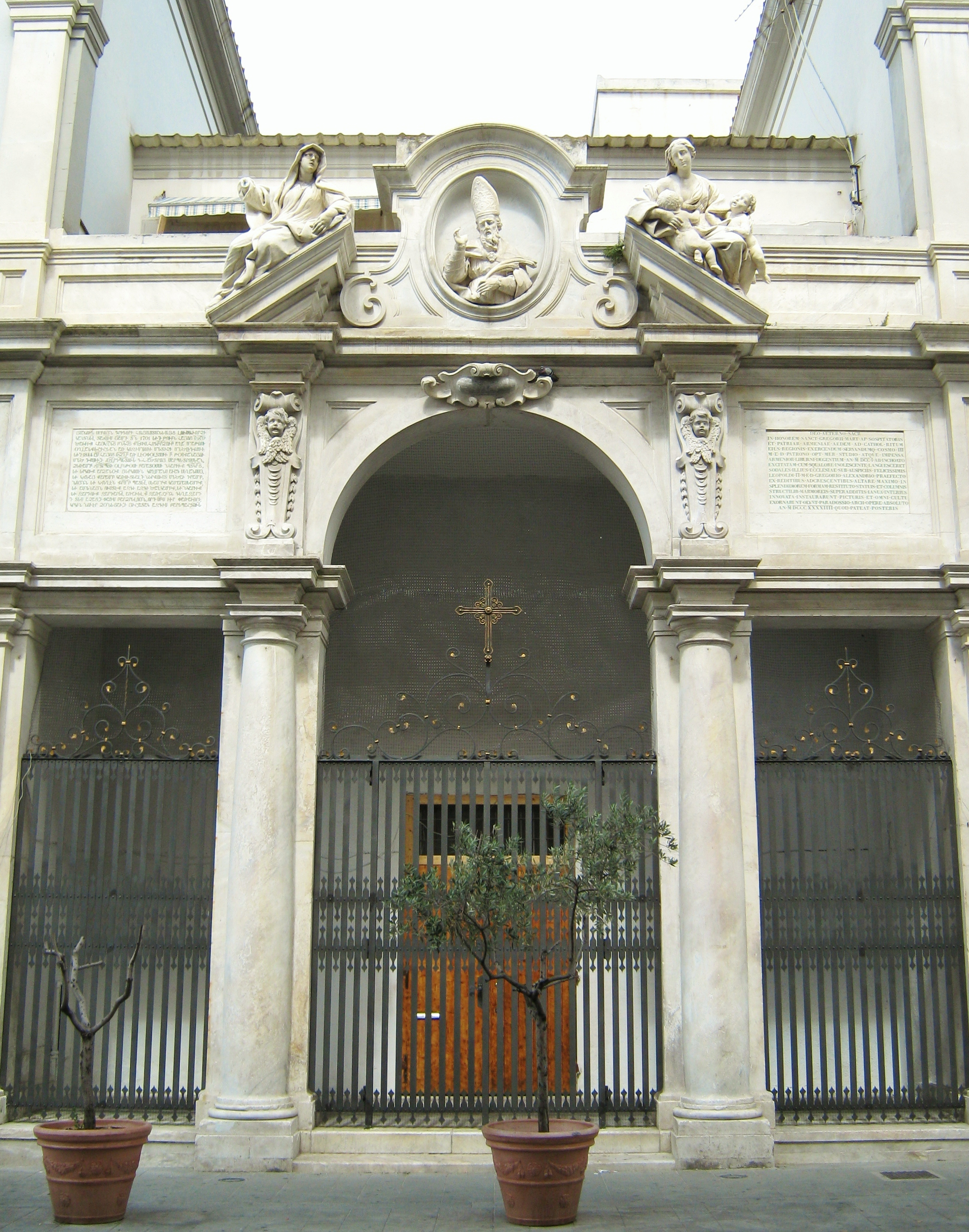
Chiesa di S.Gregorio a Livorno.jpg

The church of San Gregorio Illuminatore (St Gregory the Illuminator) was the former church of the Armenian Catholic branch in Livorno, region of Tuscany. Destroyed after the Second World War, only the elegant Baroque facade remains, now property of the Patriarch of Cilicia, and standing between two three story buildings serving since 2008 as an intercultural center. The facade is visible on via della Madonna, not far from the Temple of the Greci Uniti and the church of the Madonna. The marble facade had statues of Charity and Faith by Andrea Vaccà, and an oval image of St Gregory the Illuminator.

== History of the former church ==
Armenians had been granted privileges and admission to Livorno by Ferdinando I Medici, in June 1593. By 1683, their numbers and wealth propelled the commissioning of a church. In 1697, the Duke's consented on a financing plan that included a tax paid by Armenian merchants. The Roman Catholic Holy Congregation of the Propaganda Fide agreed with having the church by Armenian priests, but left it up to the local bishop to decide if other priests were needed. This was a problem faced by churches representing nations from the mostly Orthodox East.

Construction began in 1701 supposedly on a design by Prince Ferdinand, son of Cosimo III, and executed by Giovanni Del Fantasia. Construction was interrupted by the murder of the superintendent, but continued till consecration in 1714. In May 1799, the French confiscated from this church 47 pounds of silver objects, and the value of it was remunerated after protests in Paris. From 1843 al 1845 the church was restored to the community. The church was destroyed by bombing during the World War II.

== Former church ==
The former church was small, but highly decorated with a tall thin dome. Large canvases depicted the four doctors of the Armenian church, including St Mesrobio, inventor of the Armenian alphabet, and St Gregory baptizing the King of Armenia Teridate and his followers on the right; while St Bartholomew the Apostle preaching Christianity to the pagan Armenian king Astyages and a St Expedito (Expeditus) Martyr on left.

A small chapel was dedicated to the Madonna della Neve, venerated in Santa Maria Maggiore. In another altar of the crossing was an Assumption of the Madonna by Alessandro Gherardini; and a Madonna di Lourdes. The tribune had an antique painted crucifix, brought here in 1786 from the destroyed church of San Omobono. To the side were two statues by Emilio Demi; depicting Sermon of St John the Baptist and Grieving Mary Magdalen. In the upper tribune, Giuseppe Baldini had frescoed God the Father and in the spandrels of the cupola, the Four Evangelists. La cupola and ceiling had canvas cassettoni painted by Giovanni and Giacomo Medici of Milan.
