= Giuseppe Maria Terreni =

Italian painter (1739–1811)

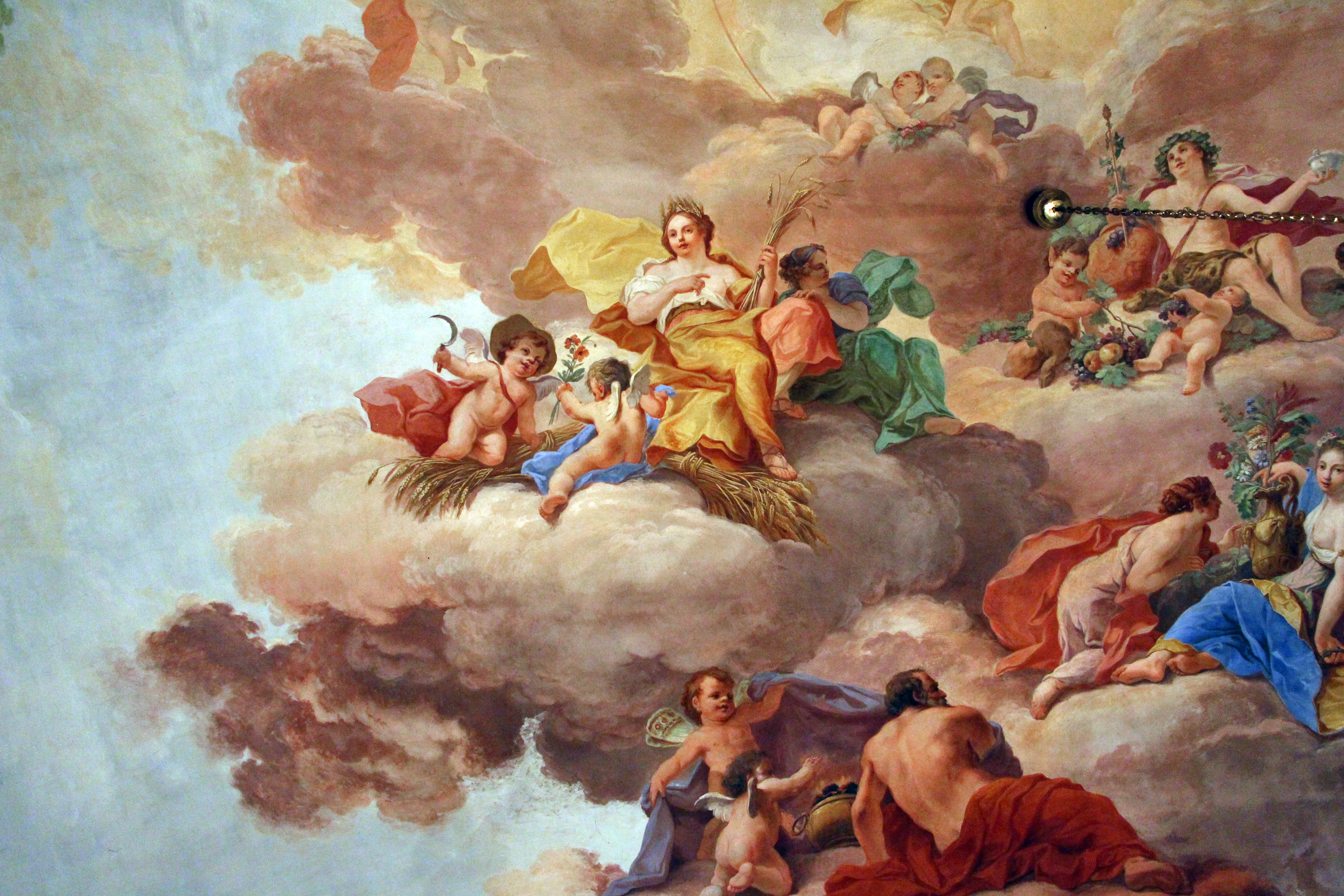
Hall of the Four Seasons, frescoes by Giuseppe Maria Terreni and Giuseppe del Moro, Villa del Poggio Imperiale, Florence

Giuseppe Maria Terreni (1739 - 1811) was an Italian Neoclassical painter.

== Biography ==
He was born in Livorno and there frescoed the Chapel of the Sacrament in the Livorno Cathedral and the Hall of Buon Umore in the Florentine Accademia of fine arts.

Terreni also painted in some chapels of the church of Santa Caterina in the neighborhood of Venezia Nuova of Livorno. Alongside Antonio Niccolini, he helped decorate the Teatro degli Avvalorati (no longer extant). he also helped decorate the cupola of the Sanctuary of Montenero. The painting Festa al Santuario di Montenero (1774), has been attributed to Terreni. Festa al Santuario di Montenero is presently at the Albright-Knox Art Gallery of Buffalo. In 1794, he painted in the Chapel of the Rosary of the Certosa di Calci in Pisa. A few years later, with Giuseppe Castagnoli, he redecorated the Sala delle Nicchie in the Palazzo Pitti of Florence.

From 1783 to 1785, he completed vedute of the city and port of Livorno, demonstrating influence of Giuseppe Zocchi and Jakob Philipp Hackert.
