= Giulio Traballesi =

Italian designer and engraver (1727–1812)

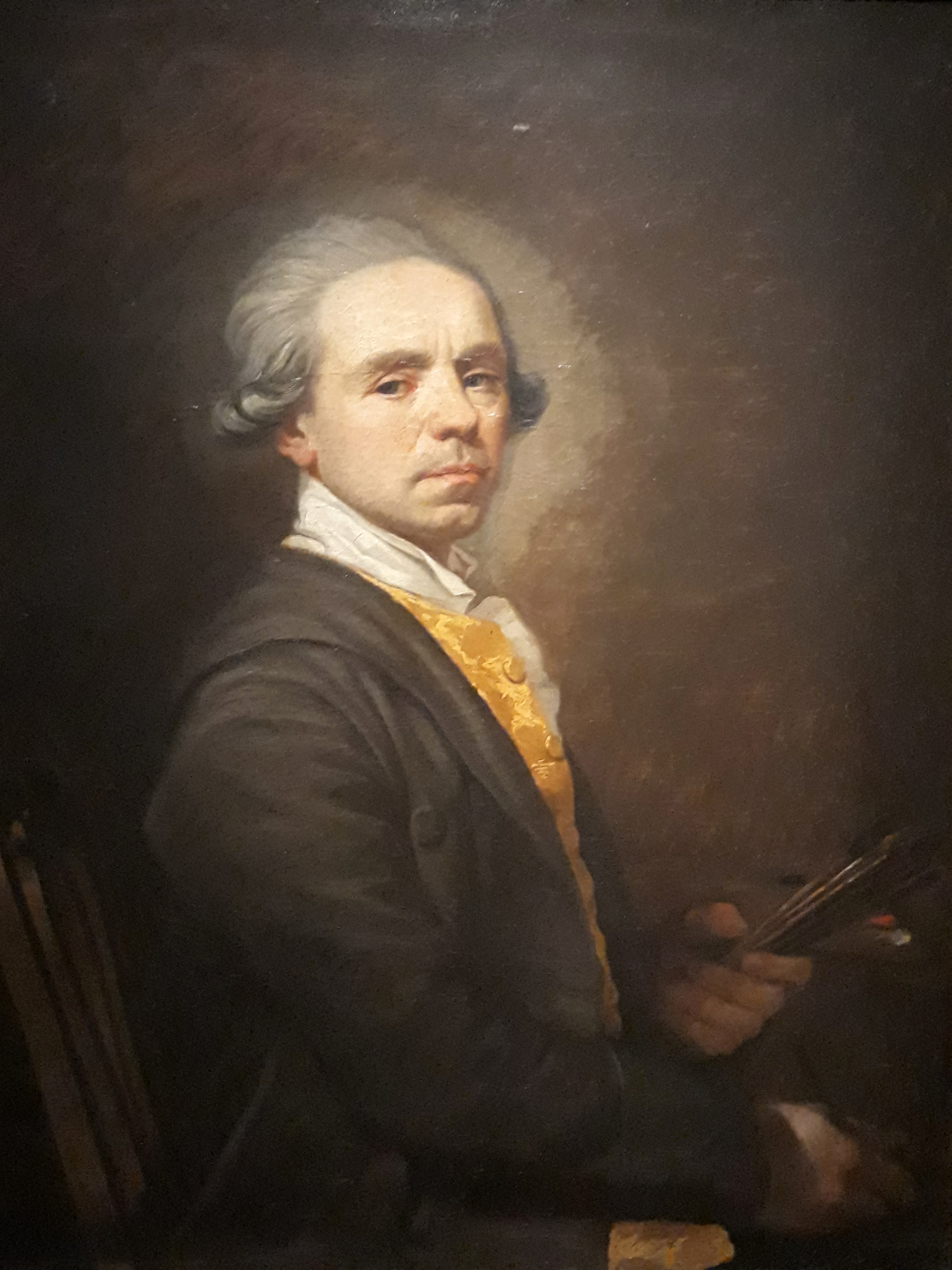
- Self-portrait (c. 1780), Milan, Pinacoteca di Brera
- Born: 2 November 1727; Florence, Grand Duchy of Tuscany
- Died: 14 November 1812 (aged 85); Milan, Kingdom of Italy
- Education: Agostino Veracini; Francesco Conti
- Employer: Brera Academy
- Known for: Painting
- Movement: Neoclassicism

Giulio or Giuliano Traballesi or Trabellesi (2 November 1727 – 14 November 1812) was an Italian Neoclassical painter and engraver. Through his prolific graphic work and academic leadership, Traballesi helped solidify Milan as the center for innovation and Neoclassical training during the late 18th century.

== Biography ==
=== Early years ===
Giulio Traballesi was born in Florence. After training with Agostino Veracini and Francesco Conti in Florence, he studied architecture under Antonio Galli-Bibiena. He widened his experience by studying painting based on the works of Antonio da Correggio of Parma and those of painters from Bologna.

In 1764, he won a competition at the Academy of Fine Arts of Parma with the painting Furius Camillus Liberating Rome from the Gallic Senones, a work that is deeply influenced by the Bolognese tradition and by the Roman classicism of Nicolas Poussin. The success of this painting won Traballesi major commissions in his native Tuscany, where the transition from Rococo to Neoclassicism had been encouraged by the reforms initiated by Leopoldo II Habsburg-Lorraine when he became Grand Duke of Tuscany in 1765.

=== Habsburg Tuscany ===
The fresco of Augustus Sacrificing to Celebrate the Peace of the Empire (1769–70) in the salon of the Villa del Poggio Imperiale outside Florence retains a Rococo illusionistic framework, yet the bold perspectives, the narrow range of colours and the concretely realized figures anticipate the later development of his art in Tuscany. From this date he turned increasingly to the Roman art of Corrado Giaquinto and Gregorio Guglielmi, and to that of the Florentine Giovanni Domenico Ferretti. On the cupola of the Sanctuary of Montenero he painted the boldly illusionistic Virgin in Glory (1771–4). In 1772 he completed the vault fresco in Santa Maria della Misericordia, Siena, with scenes from the Life of the Virgin in four medallions framed in feigned stucco, and in the same year he decorated a bay of a corridor in the Uffizi with an Allegory of Philosophy. Another significant piece of Florentine work is the fresco of Venus Interceding with Jove for Aeneas in Palazzo Montauti Niccolini. The last dated work of his Florentine period was the airy and expansive decoration (1775) of the vault of the oratory of San Firenze with the Assumption of the Virgin.

=== Lombardy ===
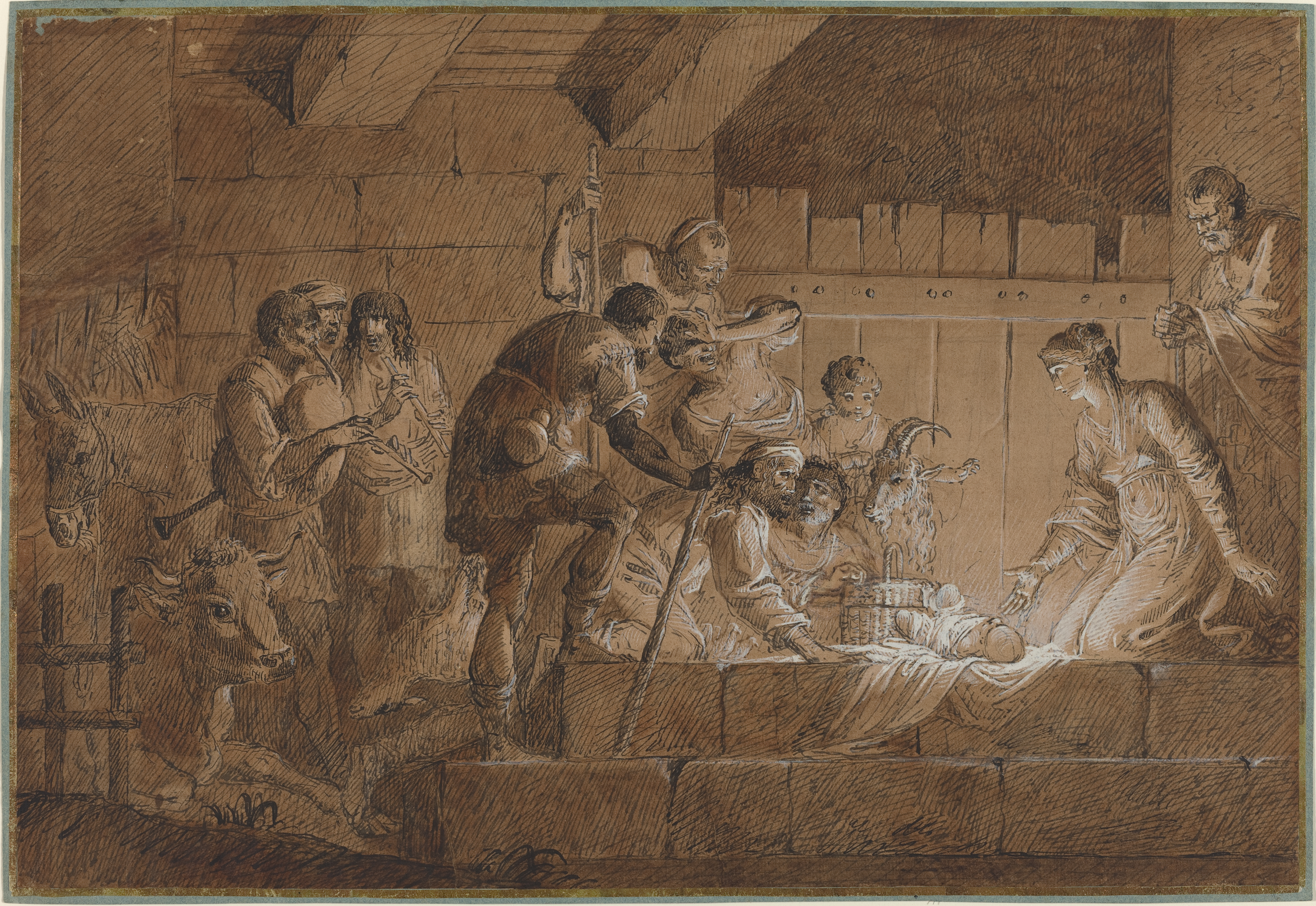
The Nativity (1794), National Gallery of Art, Washington, D.C.

In 1775 Traballesi was summoned to Milan to collaborate with the Neoclassical architect Giuseppe Piermarini, and from 1775 to 1807 he was Professore del Disegno at the newly established Brera Academy, where Andrea Appiani was one of his pupils. Through his position at the Brera Academy, Traballesi played an important role in shaping the intellectual and artistic foundations of Neoclassicism in northern Italy. The teachings emphasized the significance of linear precision, moral narrative, and classical form in visual art, aligning with the ideals of the period.

In this period Traballesi frescoed (1778–80) the new salons of the Palazzo Arciducale (now known as the Palazzo Reale), where Piermarini was the architect, with Aurora Fleeing the Night, Jove’s Repose, Cupid and Psyche and the Triumph of Hygeia (all destr. 1943). Sketches and a preparatory drawing (Milan, Biblioteca di Brera; Milan, Biblioteca Ambrosiana; Milan, Sforza Castle) survive for these frescoes. Traballesi's frescoes at the palazzi Fontana–Silvestri (where he collaborated with Appiani), Negroni-Prata and Moriggia have also been destroyed. The large fresco of Juno Commanding Aeolus to Destroy Aeneas’s Fleet (1784; Milan, Palazzo Serbelloni) is known through an engraving made by Traballesi in 1794. The surviving pictorial evidence suggests that Traballesi's Milan frescoes lost the airy and luminous qualities of his Tuscan works and were characterized by a compositional rigidity influenced by Neoclassical doctrine. Such rigidity is certainly evident in his only known large Milanese work on a religious subject, the canvas of the Assumption (Milan, San Gottardo al Palazzo).

As to the feigned low reliefs of mythological subjects in Neo-classical style that formed part of his decoration of palazzi, all that remains is a set of four overdoors from the Casa Silvestri (later Palazzo Fontana-Silvestri; Milan, priv. col.). Traballesi's smaller paintings include the Transfiguration ( 1801; Rome, priv. col.) on copper and the Self-portrait (Milan, Brera). Traballesi's many drawings are mainly in Florence (Uffizi) and Milan. Noteworthy among them are two versions of the Adoration of the Shepherds, one dated 1794 (Milan, Sforza Castle) and the other (Washington, DC, National Gallery of Art) probably created on a later date, in which the religious theme is rendered in a classical language with rich chiaroscuro effects.

Traballesi died in Milan on 14 November 1812.

== Gallery ==
Furius Camillus Liberating Rome from the Gallic Senones, 1764, Academy of Fine Arts of Parma

Assumption of the Virgin, 1775, Fresco on the ceiling of the oratory of San Firenze, Vienna

Assumption of the Virgin (Detail)

Augustus Sacrificing to Celebrate the Peace of the Empire, c. 1769-70, fresco painted by Traballesi and Giuseppe del Moro for the Villa del Poggio Imperiale

Allegory of Agriculture, 1771-75. Grottesche on the vault of the Uffizi by Traballesi and Giuseppe Maria Terreni

== Bibliography ==
- Bandera Viani, Maria Cristina (2003). "Traballesi, Giuliano". Grove Art Online. doi:10.1093/gao/9781884446054.article.T085976.
