= Palazzo Bindi Sergardi =

Coordinates: 43.31844°N 11.330015°E

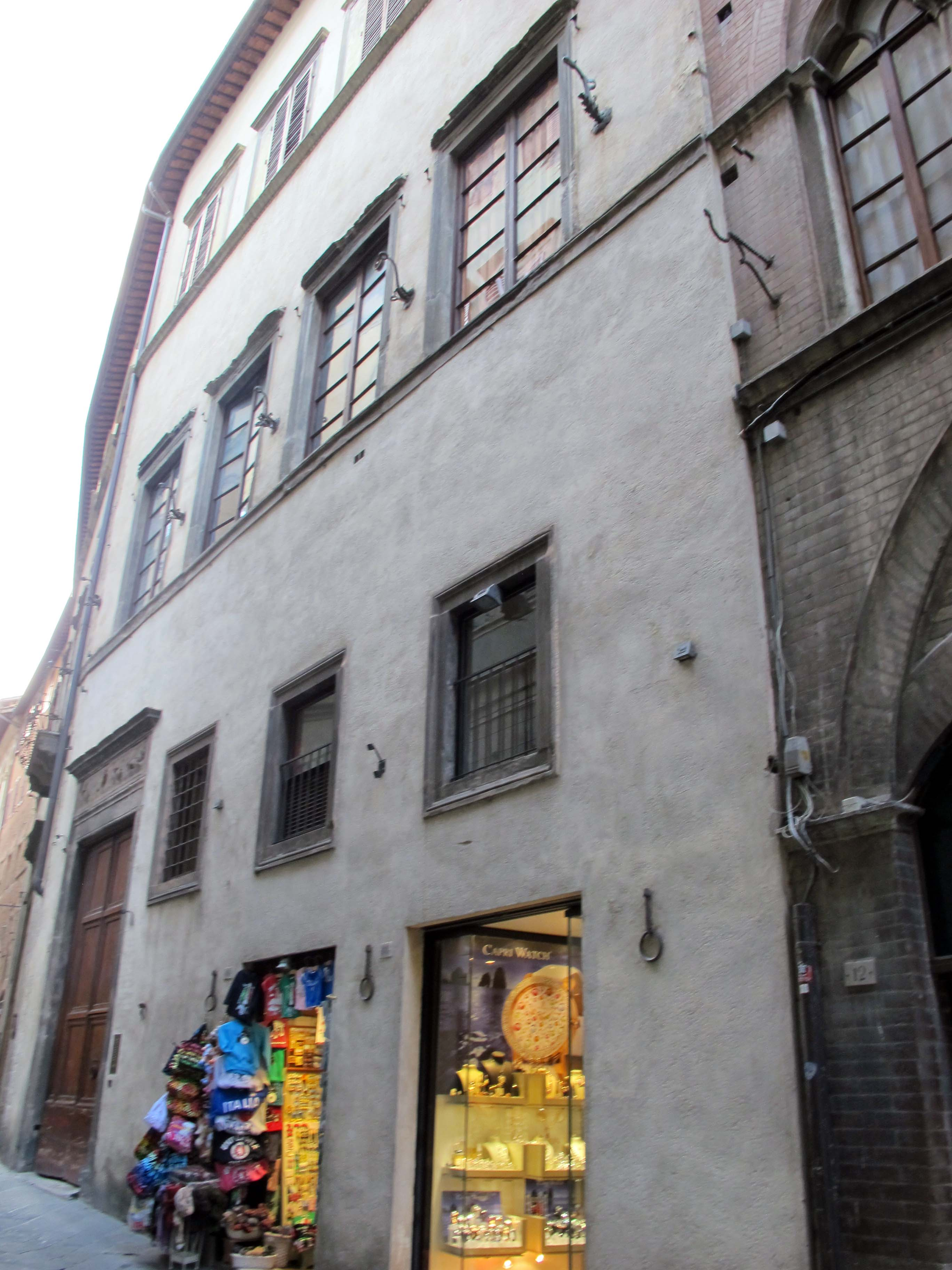
Facade

The Palazzo Bindi Sergardi, previously Agostini and later Casini-Casuccini, is, from the outside, a non-descript urban building located on Via dei Pellegrini # 18 in central Siena, region of Tuscany, Italy. The site is best known for containing frescoes by the late-Renaissance painter Domenico Beccafumi and Cristoforo Roncalli.

== History ==
The palace belonged in the 16th-century to the Venturi family, and in 1519, for the wedding of Alessandro Venturi, the painter Beccafumi was commissioned to decorate the first floor with Scenes of Roman History. In 1554, the palace was bought by Marcello Agostini, and underwent substantial renovations. With addition of a Music Room with stucco-work by Prospero Bresciano and mithologic themes frescoed by Cristoforo Roncalli. Agostini was known for assembling a Cabinet of curiosities.

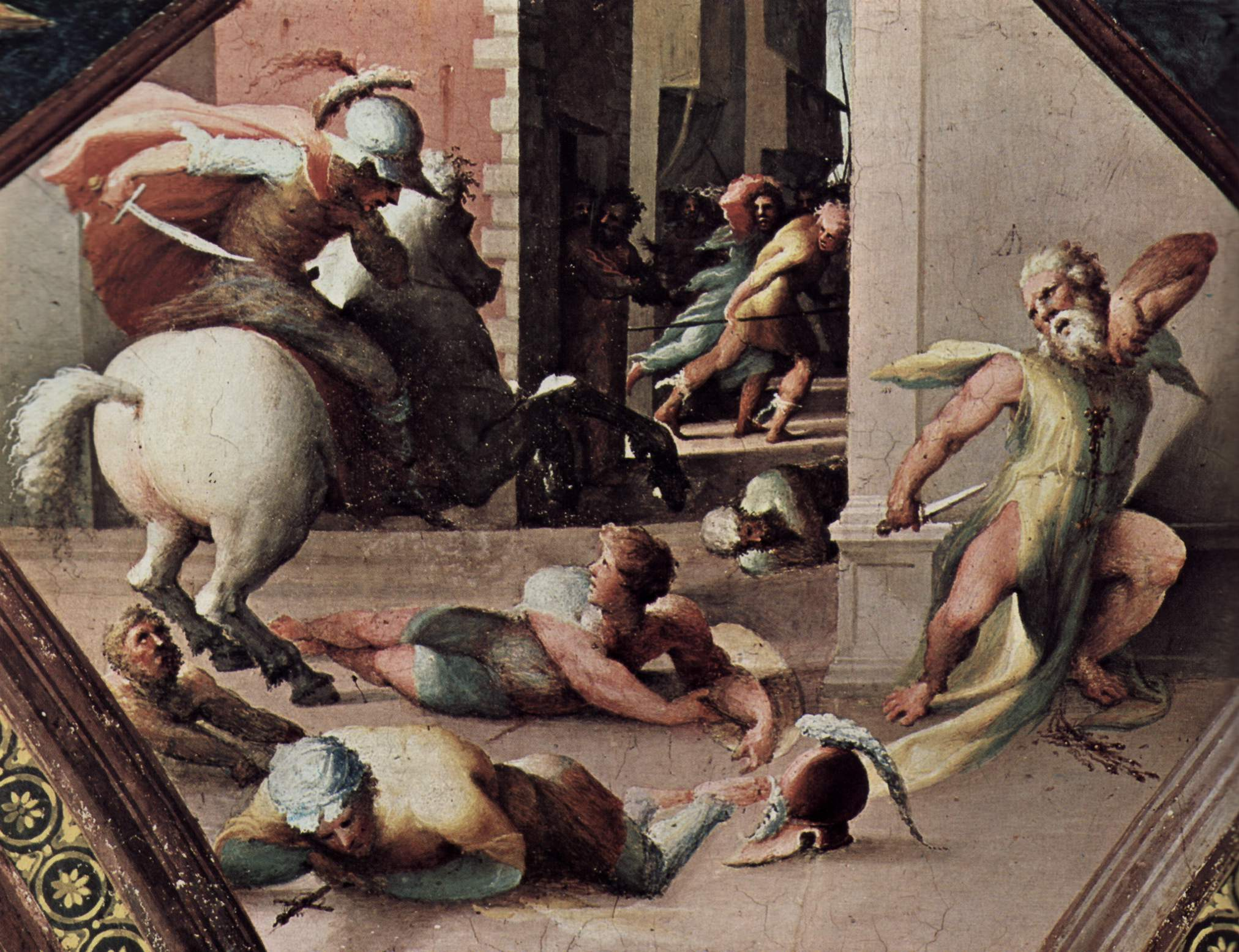
Suicide of Catone Uticense fresco by Beccafumi

== Bibliography ==
- Toscana. Guida d'Italia (Guida rossa), Touring Club Italiano, Milan 2003. ISBN 88-365-2767-1
