= Montenegrins in Slovenia =

Montenegrins in Slovenia may refer to:

- Montenegrins of Slovenia, an ethnic minority in Slovenia
- Citizens of Montenegro, living or working in Slovenia

== See also ==
- Montenegro-Slovenia relations
- Montenegrins (disambiguation)
- Montenegro (disambiguation)
