= Crnogorka =

Crnogorac may refer to:

- native name of a female person of Montenegrin ethnicity
- native name of a female person of Montenegrin citizenship
- Crnogorka (dance), folk dance from the Crna Gora region, north of Skopje
- Crnogorka, a former newspaper in Montenegro, issued from 1884 to 1885
- Crnogorka, a South Slavic female given name

== See also ==
- Crnogorac (disambiguation)
- Montenegro (disambiguation)
- Montenegrin (disambiguation)
- Montenegrins (disambiguation)
