= Montenegrins in Bosnia and Herzegovina =

Montenegrins in Bosnia and Herzegovina may refer to:

- Montenegrins of Bosnia and Herzegovina, an ethnic minority in Bosnia and Herzegovina
- Citizens of Montenegro, living or working in Bosnia and Herzegovina

== See also ==
- Montenegrins (disambiguation)
- Montenegro (disambiguation)
- Bosnia and Herzegovina
- Montenegrins in Croatia (disambiguation)
- Montenegrins in Serbia (disambiguation)
