= Crnogorac =

Crnogorac may refer to:

- native name of a male person of Montenegrin ethnicity
- native name of a male person of Montenegrin citizenship
- Crnogorac, a former newspaper in Montenegro, issued from 1871 to 1873
- Crnogorac (surname), a South Slavic surname

== See also ==
- Crnogorka (disambiguation)
- Montenegro (disambiguation)
- Montenegrin (disambiguation)
- Montenegrins (disambiguation)
