= Montenegrin literature =

Montenegrin literature may refer to:

- Literature of Montenegro, the entire (historical and modern) corpus of literature created on the territory covered by modern Montenegro
- Literature in Montenegrin language, literature created in Montenegrin language, a newly codified Serbo-Croatian variety

== See also ==
- Montenegro (disambiguation)
- Montenegrin (disambiguation)
- Montenegrins (disambiguation)
