= Montenero =

Montenero can refer to:

- Montenero di Bisaccia, town and municipality in the Province of Campobasso, region of Molise, Italy
- Montenero d'Orcia, village of the comune of Castel del Piano, province of Grosseto Tuscany, central Italy
- Montenero Sabino, comune (municipality) in the Province of Rieti in the Italian region Latium,
- Montenero Val Cocchiara, town and comune in the Province of Isernia, in the Molise region, southern Italy
- Circuito del Montenero, a Grand Prix motor racing road course located at the southern outskirts of Livorno, Italy
- Sanctuary of Montenero, religious complex in Montenero, in the Livorno Hills, in Livorno, central Italy
- Coppa Montenero, an automobile race held in Montenero, Livorno, Italy
- Montenero, fraction of Livorno.

== See also ==
- Montenegro (disambiguation)
