= Rio Ardenza =

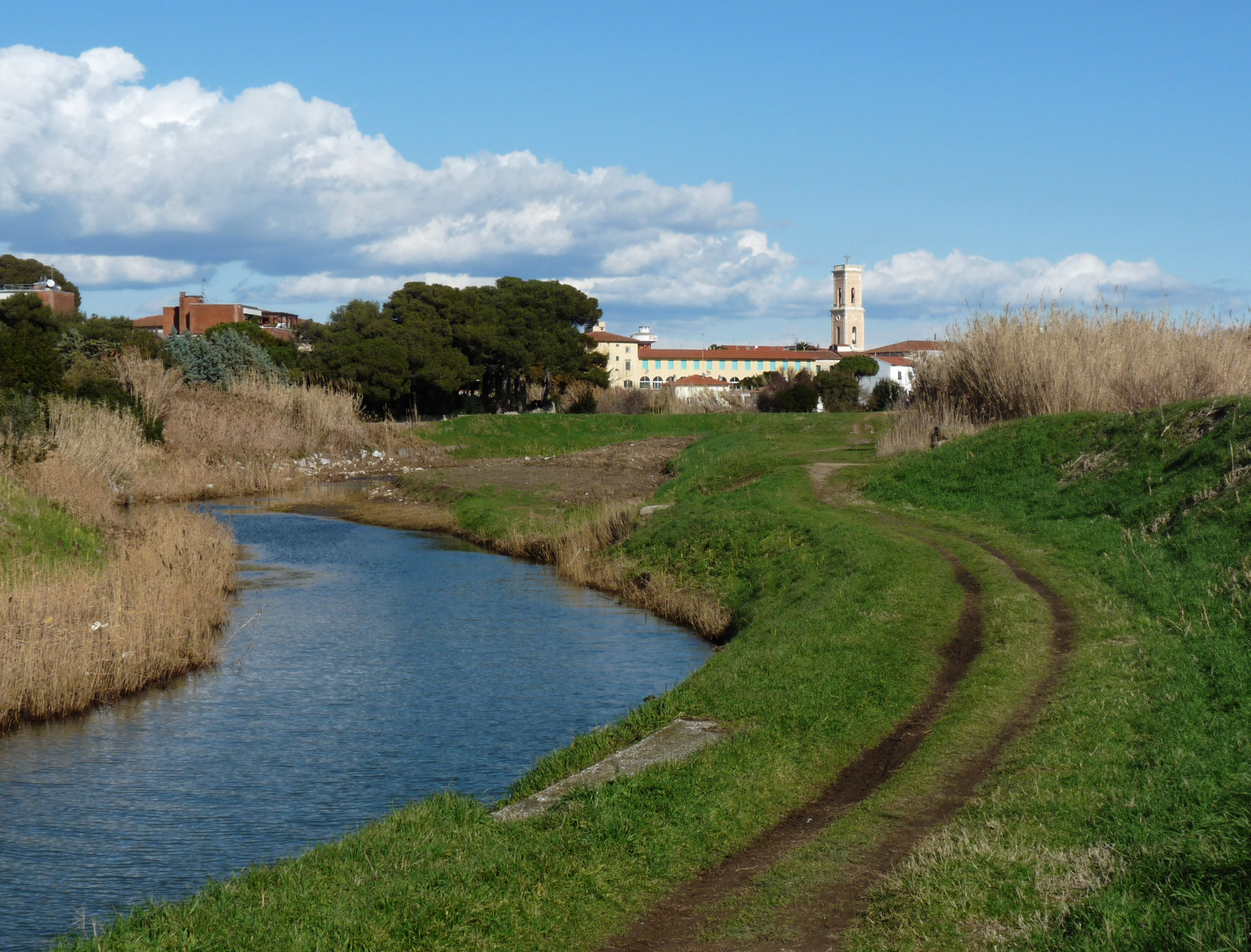

Location
- Country: Italy
- Region: Tuscany

Physical characteristics
- Source
  - location: Colline Livornesi
  - coordinates: 43°30′4.22″N 10°24′13.85″E
  - elevation: 454 metres (1,490 ft)
- Mouth
  - location: Mar Tirreno
  - coordinates: 43°30′40.67″N 10°19′4.40″E
  - elevation: 0 metres (0 ft)
- Length: 11 km (6.8 mi)
- Discharge
  - average: 15 cubic metres per second (530 cu ft/s)

The Rio Ardenza is a river in Italy.

== Geography ==
The Rio Ardenza has its source in the Colline Livornesi, near Monte Maggiore, in the lake of Popogna Vecchia. Its valley is between Valle Benedetta and Gabbro. The river can be divided into 3 sections:

1. A first, steep, section, (approximately 3 km), at the end of which receives it first major tributary, Botro Rosso (0-4 km/455-130 metres above sea level)
2. An intermediate section, with a constant slope, where it receives the Botro Sperticaia (3-7 km/120 to 40 metres above sea level)
3. A final section, almost level, where its width decreases, it crosses the frazione of Ardenza, just after receiving another major tributary, the Botro del Mulino.

The river banks are quite high. This section goes from 7 to 11 km from the source and at heights between 40 and 0 metres above sea level.
