= Montenegro (surname) =

- Place of origin: Spain

Montenegro is a surname of Galician origin, later spreading to other parts of Spain and Portugal.

Approximately 8010 people in Spain share this surname, making it the 598th most common surname in the country.

== Coat of arms ==
The main branches of the family have different coats of arms depending on the place of origin of the branch.

- Galicia: Argent, an M sable
- Asturias: Vert, an M argent crowned or
- Portugal: Argent, a mountain sable with three peaks

== Real people ==
- Ariel Alfredo Montenegro (born 1975), Argentine footballer
- Benito Jerónimo Feijóo e Montenegro (1676–1764), Galician monk and scholar
- Brian Montenegro (born 1993), Paraguayan footballer
- Bruno Montenegro (born 1991) Peruvian trans rights activist, and film director
- Conchita Montenegro (1911–2007), Spanish model, dancer, and actress
- Daniel Montenegro (born 1979), Argentine footballer
- Fernanda Montenegro (born 1929), Brazilian actress
- Gloria Montenegro, Chilean botanist, biologist, and academic
- Gloria Montenegro (politician) (1956–2025), Peruvian politician
- Guillermo Montenegro (born 1962), Argentine politician
- Hernán Montenegro (born 1966), Argentine retired basketball player
- Hugo Montenegro (1925–1981), American composer of film soundtracks
- Ignacio Montenegro (born 2004), Argentine motor racing driver
- Irís Montenegro (born 1950), Nicaraguan politician
- Jonathan Montenegro (born 1978), Venezuelan actor and singer, former member of Menudo
- Jorge Montenegro (disambiguation), several individuals
- Julio César Méndez Montenegro (1915–1996), president of Guatemala
- Lisalla Montenegro (born 1988), Brazilian fashion model
- Luís Montenegro (born 1973), prime minister of Portugal
- Markelda Montenegro de Herrera (born 1957), Panamanian politician
- Mateo Montenegro (born 1998), Argentine professional footballer
- Orlando Montenegro Medrano (1920–1988), president of Nicaragua
- Oswaldo Montenegro (born 1956), Brazilian musician
- Pierina Montenegro (born 1986), Uruguayan footballer
- Pilar Montenegro (born 1972), Mexican singer
- Raúl Montenegro (born 1949), Argentine biologist, environmentalist, and activist
- Ricardo Montenegro (born 1949), Salvadoran politician and government minister
- Roberto Montenegro (1887–1968), Mexican painter, illustrator, and stage designer
- Sasha Montenegro (1946–2024), Mexican actress of Montenegrin heritage
- Soema Montenegro (born 1978), Argentine singer-songwriter
- Valeen Montenegro (born 1986), Filipina actress and model
- Victoria Montenegro (born 1976), Argentine politician

== Fictional characters ==
- Angela Montenegro, character in the television series Bones
- Soraya Montenegro, character in the telenovela Maria de la Barrio
- Vaas Montenegro, character in the Far Cry video game series

== See also ==
- Montenegro (disambiguation)
