= Montenegrins in North Macedonia =

Montenegrins in North Macedonia may refer to:

- Montenegrins of North Macedonia, an ethnic minority in North Macedonia
- Citizens of Montenegro, living or working in North Macedonia

== See also ==
- Montenegro-North Macedonia relations
- Montenegrins (disambiguation)
- Montenegro (disambiguation)
- North Macedonia
