= Montenegrins in Serbia =

Montenegrins in Serbia may refer to:

- Montenegrins of Serbia, an ethnic minority in Serbia
- Citizens of Montenegro, living or working in Serbia

== See also ==
- Montenegro–Serbia relations
- Montenegrins (disambiguation)
- Montenegro (disambiguation)
- Serbia (disambiguation)
