= Dealbanisation =

Dealbanisation (Albanian: de-shqiptarizim) is a term used in historiographical and political discourse as the process of denationalisation of Albanians which was initiated by the Kingdom of Serbia after the annexation of Kosovo in 1912. The process continued to 1918 and was adopted by the Kingdom of Serbs, Croats and Slovenes against the Albanian populations of Kosovo between 1918 and 1938. The Kingdom of Serbs, Croats and Slovenes resisted the Kachak movement and used Serbo-Montenegrin colonisers in an attempt to "de-albanize" areas inhabited by Albanians. There is an integration process among Albanian immigrants in Greece that can be perhaps termed as 'de-albanisation'. In Albanian historiography the term is also used in order to refer to the process of "dealbanization" of Albanian historical figures in Balkan historiography. In post-Yugoslav countries with significant Albanian minorities, the term is used in a form which alludes to the ethnic slur Šiptar, dešiptarizacija, as a nationalist slogan directed against Albanian communities.

== In Countries ==
=== Kosovo ===
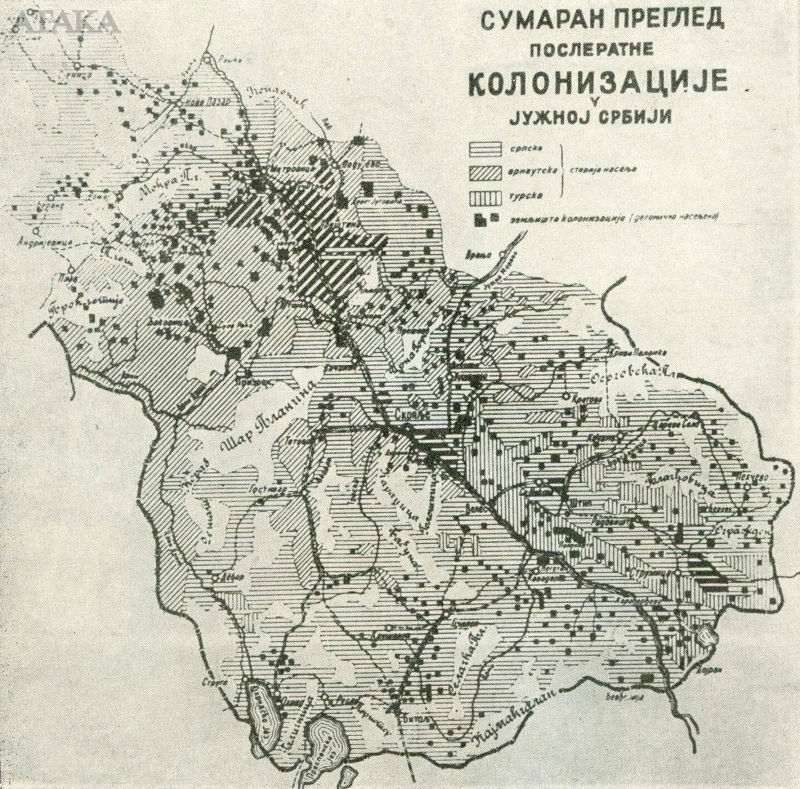
Serbian colonization in Kosovo and Vardar Macedonia between 1920 and 1930. Colonized areas are in thick hatched black lines and colonized settlements are shown as black squares.

During the disintegration of Yugoslavia, the term entered again in political discourse. In 1989, Rugova opposed the "de-albanization" of Kosovo. In 1992, the Serbian Radical Party recommended that Kosovo be "de-albanized". After the riots in Kosovo, Slobodan Milošević implemented a policy of "dealbanization" similar to those in 1918. In political discourse in Serbia, the call for dealbanizacija as it became an unrealistic goal after the Kosovo War gave way to a more pragmatic - as viewed from the Serbian perspective - call for federalizacija (the political attempt to keep Kosovo Albanians within a Serbia with broad autonomy) across the political spectrum.

=== Republic North of Macedonia ===
The ultras of FK Vardar, one of the biggest clubs in North Macedonia have frequently unveiled a banner with the call for dešiptarizacija during the club's football matches. In 2017, such an incident was followed by an attack against Albanian youngsters who were walking outside the stadium.
