= Fonte di San Fele =

Fountain in Montenero, Livorno, Italy

Coordinates: 43°29′43″N 10°21′01″E

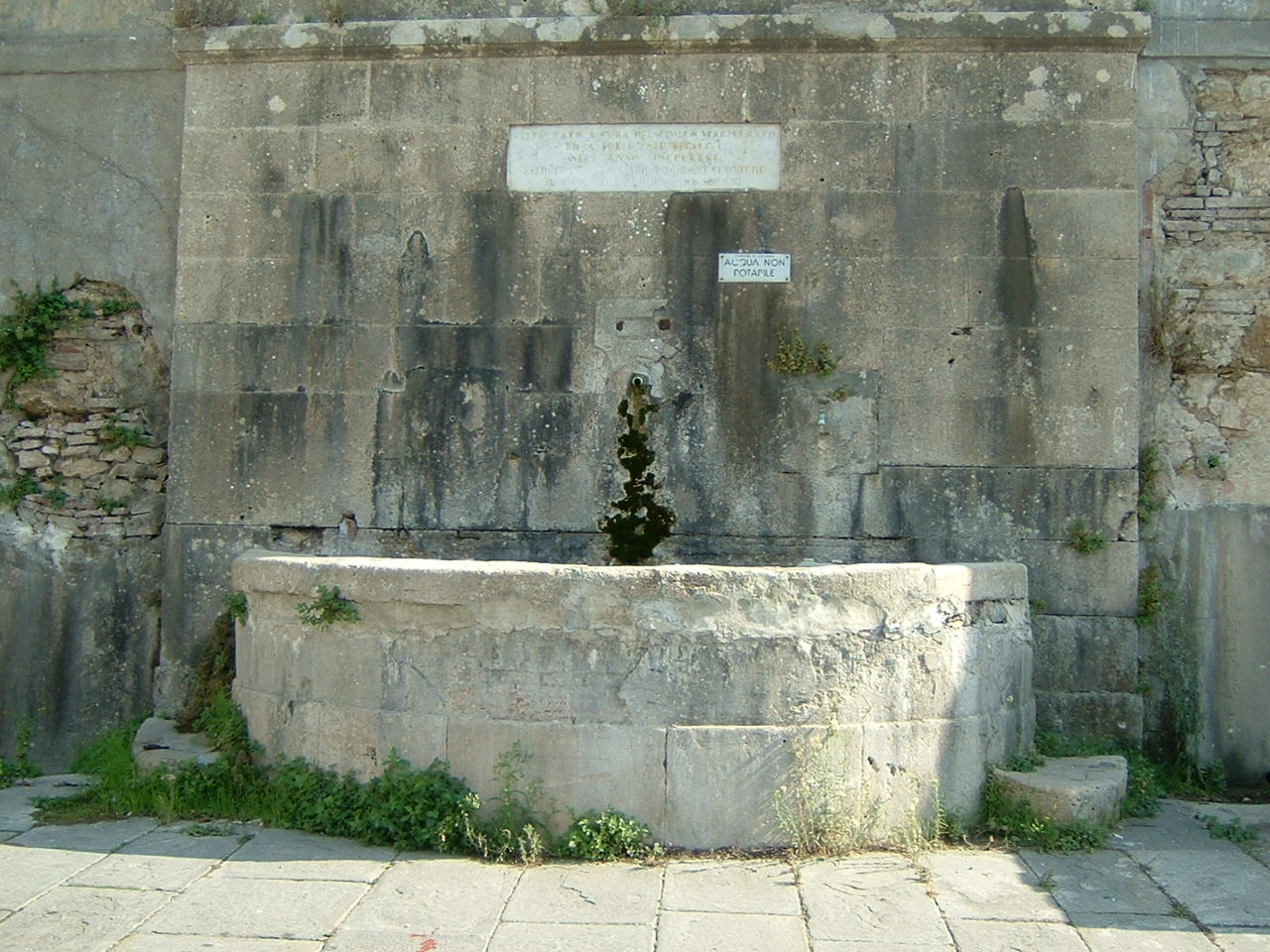
The fountain viewed frontally

The Fonte di San Fele is a fountain in Montenero, Livorno, Italy. It is named after a religious building (Pieve di San Fele), which identity is unclear, cited in 1082 as part of the plover of Saint Paul in Ardenza. It is a very simple structure consisting in a semicircular basin set against a stone-clad backdrop and a small side drain.

== History ==
The fountain has remote origins of which there no trace, its presence is first noticed in a document dated 1692 in the Archive of State of Livorno, in which the presence of the source is evident, together with the nearby church and water reservoir. Notable is the supply system, entirely rebuild at the beginning of the 19thentury, which consist in a trench intercepting surface waters drained into the fountain.

To guarantee a certain regularity of the water flow, on the back of the stone facing, there is a reservoir supplied by the same overflow structure. Rather than for its architectural relevance, the fountain is well-known due to is importance in rituals related to the Santuario di Montenero.
