= Montenegrins in Croatia =

Montenegrins in Croatia may refer to:

- Montenegrins of Croatia, an ethnic minority in Croatia
- Citizens of Montenegro, living or working in Croatia

== See also ==
- Croatia-Montenegro relations
- Montenegrins (disambiguation)
- Montenegro (disambiguation)
