= Montenero (Livorno) =

- Frazione
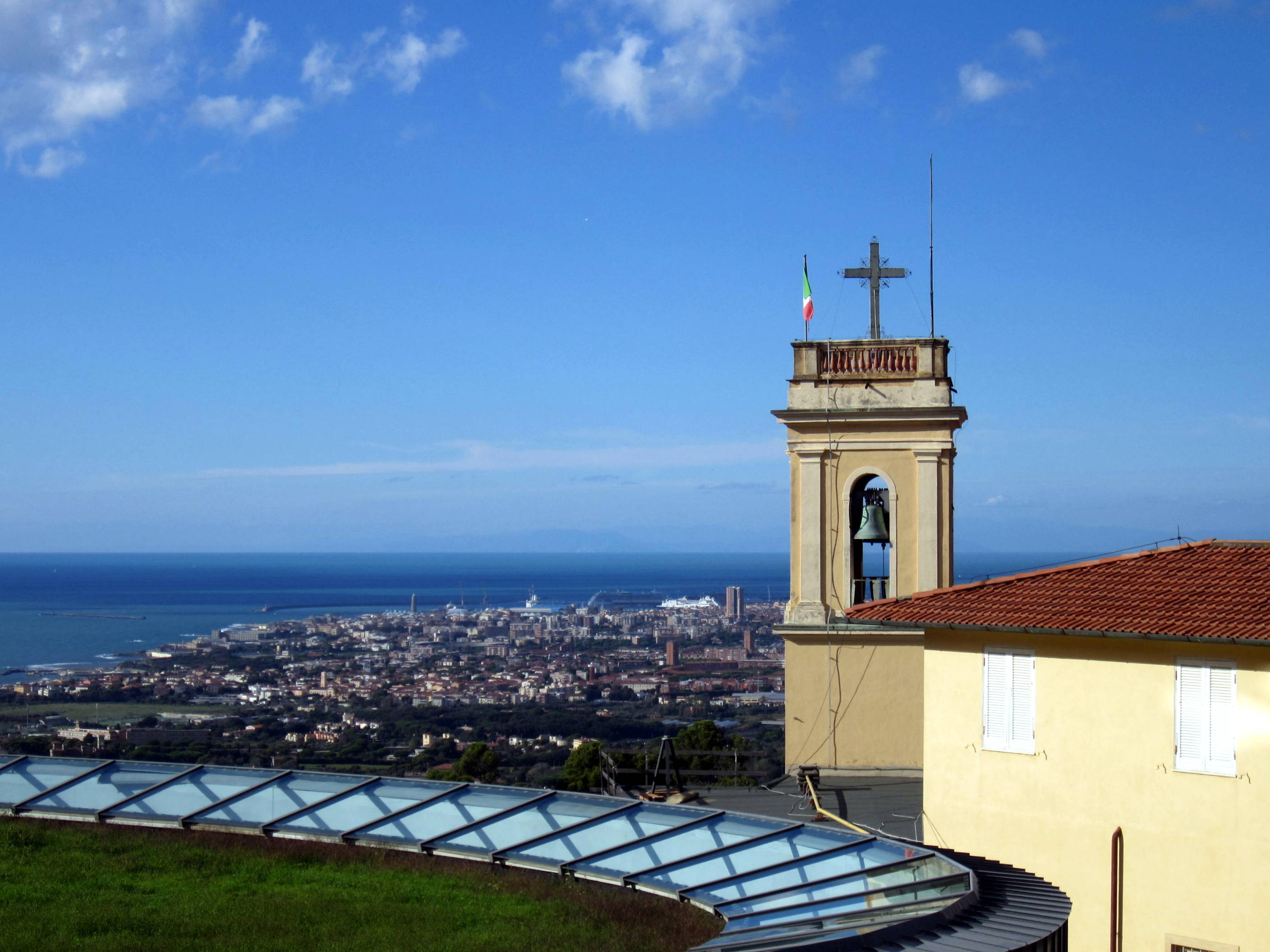
- View of the Sanctuary and panorama

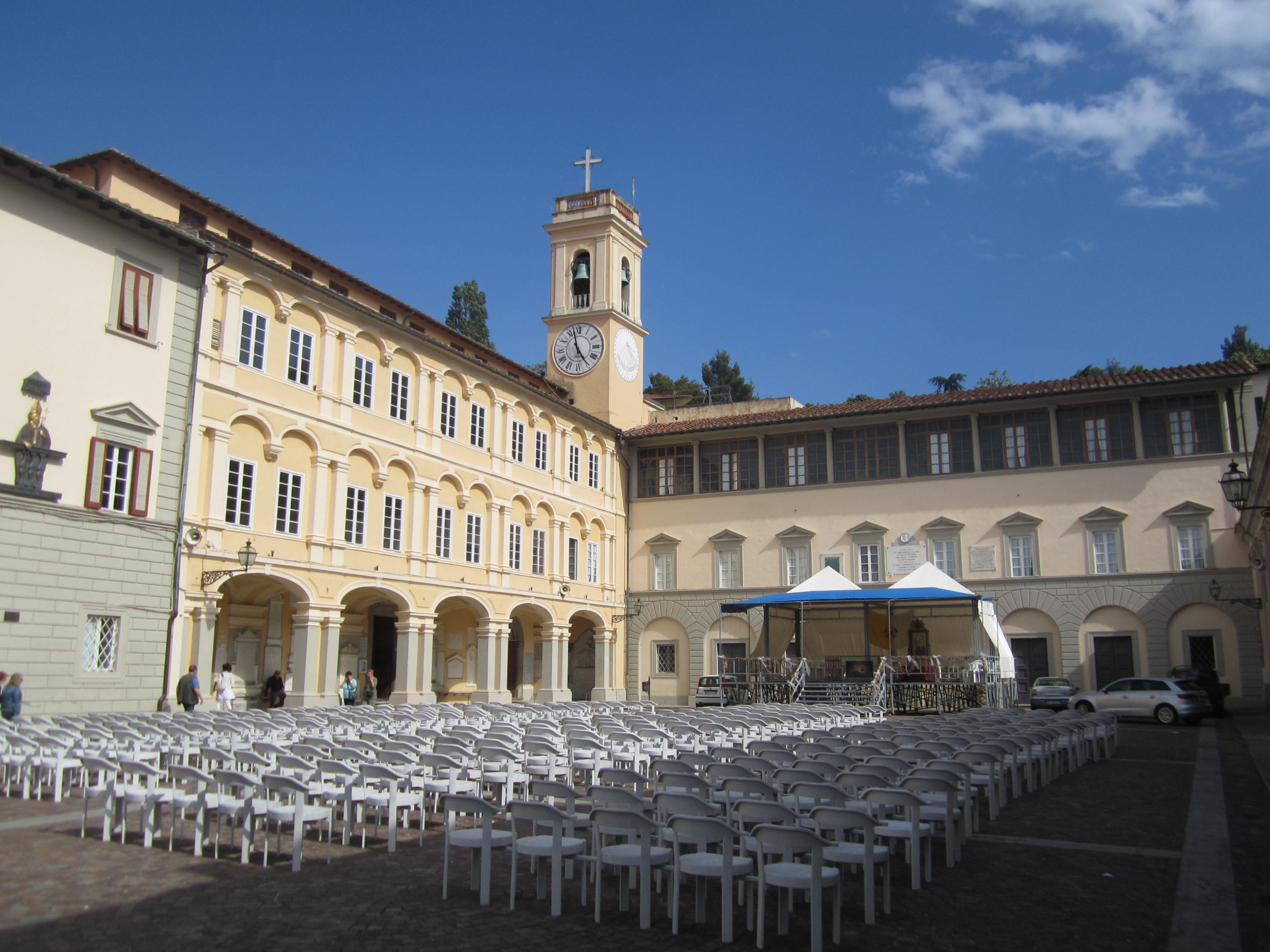
- Santuario di Montenero

- Location of Montenero in Italy
- Coordinates: 43°30′1″N 10°21′6″E
- Country: Italy
- Region: Tuscany
- Province: Livorno (LI)
- Comune: Livorno
- Elevation: 190 m (620 ft)

Population
  - Total: 3,830
- Demonym(s): Monteneresi, montineresi
- Time zone: UTC+1 (CET)
  - Summer (DST): UTC+2 (CEST)
- Postal code: 57128

Montenero is a fraction of Livorno, Tuscany, in Italy situated on the slopes of a hill and known for the Santuario della Madonna delle Grazie di Montenero.

== History ==
The area was inhabited by humans since Neolithic, as proved by the many artefacts that have been found on the slopes of the hill, (for example those found in 1855 near "Buca delle Fate"). In antiquity the hill, the height of which is 313 m, was known as "Monte del Diavolo" (Mountain of the Devil), it later assumed the current denomination "Montenero" or "Monte Nero" (Black Mountain) due to the a thick forest which scared the travellers. Administered directly by the "Capitanato" of Livorno in the 17th century, it was a compulsory passage for people travelling from Livorno to the south, Grosseto and Rome, until the creation, in the end of the 19th century of the coastal road.

The village saw a sensible enlargement since the 18th century, mostly due to the enlargement of the Sanctuary. In that time many villas were built in the area, also giving the setting for Carlo Goldoni's comedy Le avventure della villeggiatura. Among these residences there is Villa delle Rose, where the English poet George Gordon Byron stayed for some time; as well as Villa del Buffone and Villa Carboni. On 19 August 1908 was inaugurated a funicular railway, linking the lower part (Montenero Basso) to the higher part (Montenero Alto), of the length of 656 m, which was renovated in 1979 and carries approximately 250,000 passengers per year.

== Geography ==
The fraction is located on the northern slopes of a hill, and is connected to the city of Livorno by Via di Montenero, which arrives in the piazza del Santuario (Square of the Sanctuary), in Montenero Alto, at a height of 190 m. The main square of Montenero Basso (70 m) is called Piazza delle Carrozze, and is the starting point of the funicular.

== Places of interest ==
- Sanctuary of Montenero
- Montenero Funicular
- Fonte di San Fele
