= Sanctuary of Montenero =

Basilica in Livorno, Italy

Coordinates: 43°29′34″N 10°21′00″E

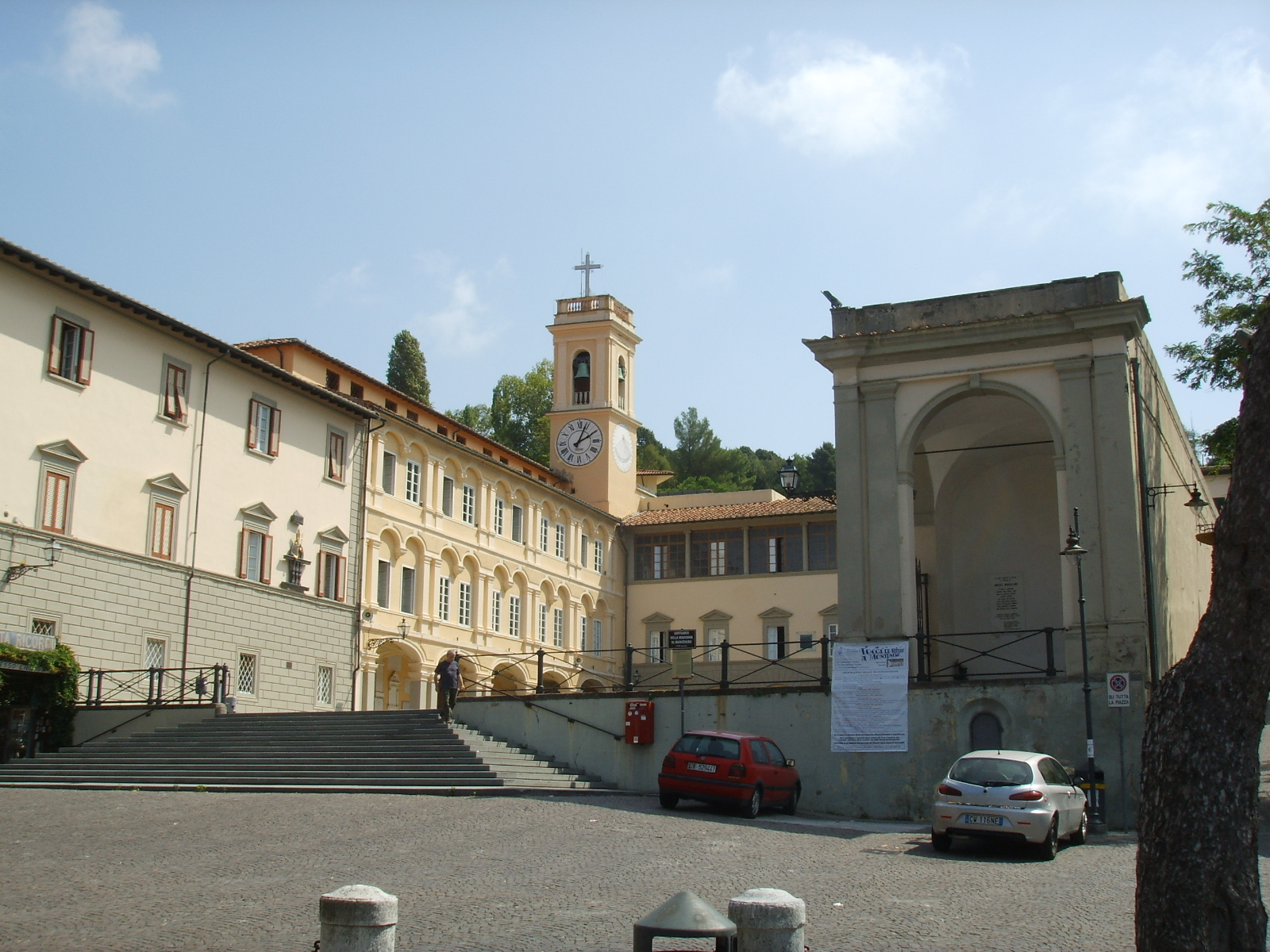
Sanctuary of Montenero

The Shrine of Our Lady of Grace, also known as Sanctuary of Montenero, is a religious complex in Monte Nero, a village in Livorno Hills, near Livorno, central Italy reachable by a funicular.

The complex, elevated to the rank of Basilica and maintained by Vallombrosian monks, is devoted to Our Lady of Grace of Montenero, patron of Tuscany. It also includes a rich gallery of votive offerings.

== History ==
To commemorate a legend, a small Chapel was built at the beginning of the road that leads to the shrine dating back to 1603. In 1956 it was replaced by a larger church.

The Theatines enlarged the sanctuary. Between the end of the 16th century and early 17th century an oval atrium was added and richly decorated. After the suppression of religious orders by Grand Duke Peter Leopold, the sanctuary fell into ruin. It was later restored.

== Grottos ==
The presence of caves dug into the hill behind the shrine is attested since ancient times and probably have also been a refuge for robbers. Montenero was known as "the devil’s mountain". In the early 20th century, they were extended as a result of an excavation company, which obtained permission for the extraction of the stone material. Having hosted shelters during World War II, it had been fully consolidated in 1971 and then open to visitors of the shrine. Due to land fall the Grotto has been closed to the public for quite a few years now.

== Sources ==
- G. Batini, Toscana fuoristrada, Bonechi Editore, Florence 1971.
- G. Piombanti, Guida storica ed artistica della città e dei dintorni di Livorno, Livorno 1903.
