= Yugoslav colonization of Kosovo =

Attempts to bring Kosovo under control of Serbia and Montenegro

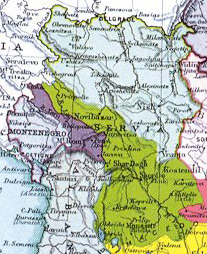
- Division of Kosovo vilayet between the Kingdom of Serbia (green) and the Kingdom of Montenegro (purple) following the Balkan Wars 1913
- Location: Kosovo (spillover: Montenegro, North Macedonia, and Albania)
- Date: 1912–1999
- Target: Albanians
- Attack type: Colonization, mass murder, arson, discrimination, ethnic cleansing, genocidal massacres
- Deaths: Balkan Wars (1912–1913); c. 120,000–270,000 (by 1914); Kosovo: 50,000; Albania: c. 100,000; (see details); Interwar Period (1918–1921); c. 80,000; Kosovo: >12,000 (by 1921); Montenegro: 18–30,000 (by 1919); Macedonia: 30–40,000 (by 1919); (see details); Kosovo War (1998–99); 7,000–9,000; (see details)
- Perpetrators: Kingdom of Serbia (1912–1918); Kingdom of Montenegro (1912–1918); Kingdom of Yugoslavia (1918–1940); SFR Yugoslavia (1953–1966); FR Yugoslavia (1989–99)
- Motive: Anti-Albanian sentiment, Greater Serbia, Ultranationalism

Over the course of the twentieth century, Kosovo experienced four major colonisation campaigns that aimed at altering the ethnic population balance in the region, to decrease the Albanian population and replace them with Serbs and Montenegrins. The colonisation programme began in the early twentieth century between the kingdoms of Serbia and Montenegro during the Balkan Wars and was later implemented by their successor state Yugoslavia at certain periods from the interwar era until 1999. Albanians formed the ethnic majority in the region when it became part of Yugoslavia in the early twentieth century.

Fears over Albanian separatism and the need to secure Kosovo, a strategic territory for the country drove the state to pursue colonisation as a solution. The Serbian political elite held the view that Kosovo was a former late medieval Serb territory that following the Ottoman conquest was settled by Albanians. As such, the colonisation process along with the displacement of Albanians and purchase of their property was understood as "a logical sequel to the liberation war", in which the four Balkan states defeated the Ottoman Empire.

The first brief attempts at colonisation were made by Montenegro and Serbia during the Balkan Wars and First World War. Following the end of the wars and the creation of Yugoslavia, the interwar period experienced the most colonisation activity. Between 60,000 and 65,000 colonists, of whom over 90% were Serbs, settled on the territory of the former Kosovo Vilayet captured from the Ottoman Empire in 1912. In addition to them, numbers of state bureaucrats and their families also settled in Kosovo. Along with Serb colonisation, a policy of forced migration of ethnic Albanians was implemented, enlisting the participation of Turkey to resettle them in its territory. During the interwar period as a whole, 90,000-150,000 Albanians and other Muslims emigrated from Kosovo, where 200,000 hectares of agricultural land (over a third of the total amount of agricultural land) were confiscated from the original owners, of which half was distributed to colonists.

During the Interwar period, tens of thousands of Albanians were killed in Kosovo, the Vardar province (modern-day North Macedonia), and Montenegro. Albanian armed resistance to Kosovo's incorporation into Yugoslavia following WWI emerged in the Kachak Movement, triggering a conflict that lasted until 1921 when the movement was suppressed. As a result, more than 12,000 Albanians were killed in Kosovo from 1918 to 1921. In 1919, U.S. Army colonel Sherman Miles reported that between 18,000 and 25,000 Albanians had been killed in Montenegro, according to the British Mission in Shkodër and as many as 30,000 according to Albanian estimates. In July 1919, the French consulate in Skopje (North Macedonia) reported nine massacres of 30,000-40,000 victims. According to Haki Demolli, 80,000 Albanians were killed in Yugoslavia by 1940.

During the Second World War, Kosovo was attached to Italian controlled Albania and the colonist population fled to neighbouring Axis occupied Serbia and Montenegro. At the end of the war, the government of Yugoslavia prohibited the return of colonists and stopped the colonization programme. Forced migration of Albanians to Turkey resumed and Serb settlers were installed in Kosovo until the ouster of Ranković in 1966. In the 1990s, the government of President Slobodan Milošević attempted the colonisation of Kosovo using various financial and employment incentives to encourage Serb settlement and later through forceful resettlement of Serb refugees from the Yugoslav Wars.

The colonisation of Kosovo is generally considered an unsuccessful project because it satisfied neither the state nor the settlers, nor the home population. The politics related to the colonisation process and its effects upon various population groups of Kosovo remains a topic of interest and discussion in scholarship.

== Rationale ==
The cult of Kosovo within Serbian nationalism was used as a justification for Serbian claims to the territory. However, it was not a central theme until the 1860s.

== Before WWII ==
=== First phase: Balkan Wars and First World War (Montenegro and Serbia) ===
Kosovo was part of the Ottoman Empire and following the Balkan Wars (1912–1913), the western area was included in Montenegro and the rest within Serbia. Beginning from 1912, Montenegro initiated its attempts at colonisation and enacted a law on the process during 1914 that aimed at expropriating 55,000 hectares of Albanian land and transferring it to 5,000 Montenegrin settlers. Some Serb colonisation of Kosovo took place during the Balkan Wars. Serbia undertook measures for colonisation by enacting a decree aimed at colonists within "newly liberated areas" that offered 9 hectares of land to families.

=== Second phase: Interwar Yugoslavia ===
In the aftermath of the First World War, Serbia and Montenegro became part of Yugoslavia. Serbian control over Kosovo was restored and the state attempting to counteract Albanian separatism pursued a policy to alter the national and religious demographics of Kosovo and to Serbianise the area through colonization. Yugoslavia had signed the Protection for Minorities treaty, yet Albanians were not extended the rights of recognition as a minority or to Albanian language education. Kosovo, along with northern region of Vojvodina were areas where Serbs were not a majority population and the state sought demographic change in those areas through land reform and a colonization policy. A new decree issued in 1919 and later in 1920 restarted the colonization process in places where Albanians lived in Kosovo and Vardar, Macedonia. Between 1918 and 1945, over 100,000 Albanians left Kosovo.

=== Kosovo ===
Kosovo was strategically important for the state, its elite and security with the Albanian population deemed as "unreliable" and concerns existed over possible future rebellions by locals that did not approve of its governance. The stance of Serbian political elite held that Kosovo was an late medieval Serb territory that after the Ottoman conquest had been settled by Albanians. Vasa Šaletić, the head of the governing body for the colonisation process described the process of displacing Albanians and purchasing their property as "a logical sequel to the liberation war", in which four Balkan states defeated the Ottoman Empire. Aiming to achieve a favourable political outcome, the state pursued various measures through violence and administrative avenues such as expulsions and replacing Albanians with another population. At the time in the Yugoslav census of 1921, Albanians formed the majority population of Kosovo at around 64 percent with some 72 percent belonging to the Muslim faith. Government sponsored colonisation of Kosovo and Vardar Macedonia was initiated in 1920 when on 24 September the Assembly of the Yugoslav Kingdom passed the Decree on the Colonisation of the Southern Provinces of Yugoslavia.

Both the decrees of 24 September 1920 and 11 July 1931 outlined the types of land that could be colonised and it included state land deemed not in use, communal land that went beyond the requirements of a community, land belonging to outlaws, land classified as abandoned, and large estate properties that could be subdivided through agricultural reform. Land that was considered abandoned and land expropriated from Albanians amounted to some 228,000 hectares of mainly farmable land. The decrees were intended as a reward to former soldiers and Chetniks for their service during the Balkan Wars and World War One, with incentives offered to settle in Kosovo that allowed them to claim between 5 and 10 hectares of land. The military veterans that settled in Kosovo were known as dobrovoljac (volunteers) and were a politically reliable group for the state. The colonisation process also entailed the arrival of Serbian bureaucrats to Kosovo along with their families. During 1919–1928 some 13,000 to 15,914 Serbian families came to live in Kosovo as stipulated in the conditions of the decrees. The process involved the construction of 106 colonies and 245 new settlements in Kosovo and due to serbianisation efforts some were named Lazarevo, Obilić, Miloševo after heroes from Serbian epic poetry. Other places such as Ferizović (Alb: Ferizaj) had their name changed to Uroševac.

=== Closing of schools and colonisation ===
After 1918, all Albanian schools in Montenegro, Macedonia and Kosovo were closed and around 400,000 ethnic Albanians were denationalised. According to Vladan Jovanovic, Yugoslav authorities opened Turkish schools and not Albanian. Around 60% of Albanians were left without an income as a consequence of Yugoslav policy. Public services were closed to them and religious offices were politicised. Yugoslav authorities also intended to replace Albanians in the region with Chetniks, war veterans and police men, as well as border police, refugees and party activists. In 1930, there existed no Albanian schools in Kosovo.

=== Kachak movement ===
Parts of the Albanian population that resisted Serbian rule in Kosovo began military maneuvers and formed the Kachak movement. Under the political leadership of Hasan Prishtina and Bajram Curri, the movement based itself in Shkodër and was led by the Committee for the National Defence of Kosovo organization. Among their demands were the re-opening of Albanian language schools, recognition of Albanian as a co-official language and autonomy, with the goal of uniting Kosovo with Albania. The Kachaks engaged in uprisings, targeting Serbian army and administrative formations but forbade its members from targeting unarmed Serbs and churches. The Serbian authorities regarded them as mere bandits and in response to their rebellion, retaliated by conducting operations against them as well as the civilian population. In 1919, a large-scale revolt in Drenica involving 10,000 people instigated by Azem Galica was quelled by the Yugoslav army. By 1924, military confrontations between Albanians and Serbs ended as the Kachak movement was effectively suppressed.

=== Consequences ===
As the Yugoslav forces pushed through the Albanian inhabited villages there were series of expulsions and massacres being carried out. According to Albanian sources, between 1913 and 1939, flying detachment of Serbian forces acted and punished the civil population. Between 1918 and 1921, Serbian forces killed 12,346 civilians, burned 320 villages, looted 50,000 houses, imprisoned 22,16 and burned roughly 6000 houses. Between 1913 and 1920, Serb colonists were given special privileges by the authorities to settle in areas, previously inhabited by Albanians, who had been vanished or killed numbering 60 000.

== Atrocities against Albanians during the Interwar Period ==
Despite that the Kingdom of Serbs, Croats and Slovenes kingdoms had signed the international acts of the time, which defined the rights of national minorities, according to the Treaty of Saint Germain, also unified by the League of Nations, terror against the Albanian population continued between 1912 and 1915. According to a statistics published later in Italy, Serbian troops alone killed 6,040 in January and February 1919, destroying 3,873 homes.

=== Kosovo ===
In 1924, Yugoslav forces entered the village of the Albanian Konjuhi family and massacred the entire family.

In 1924 two villages were destroyed and 300 families killed. Between 1919 and 1921, around 1,330 Albanians were killed in Mitrovica.

According to an Albanian newspaper, in the province of Pristina, the Serbian troops had killed 4,600 people between 1918 and 1921, imprisoned 3,659 people, beat 353 people, destroyed 1,346 houses and looted 2,190 houses.

In 1919, Yugoslav forces committed many atrocities in Rugova. From 25 December 1918 to early March 1919 around 842 Albanians were killed including women, elderly, children, and infants.

In January 1921, atrocities were reported against Albanian civilians in Keqekollë and Prapashticë.

In 1921, there was a massacre carried out by Serbo-Montenegrin military and paramilitary Chetniks against the Albanian population in the village of Jabllanica in the region of Dushkajë. One of the perpetrators was Kosta Pećanac. 63 civilians were killed during the day.

In Peja 1,563 Albanians were massacred and 714 homes were destroyed from 1919 and 1921. There were roughly 4,600 killed in Prizren along with 2,194 homes torched between 1919 and 1921. From 1919 to 1921, around 1,694 people were massacred in Ferizaj.

=== Montenegro ===
On 25 December 1919, the Montenegrin commander Savo Vujošević arrived at Hoti in the region of Kushë in Gjytetzë with his army. 72 Albanians were arrested and sent to Prekaliaj, kept all night and then executed the following morning, and thrown in a mass grave, hoping to hide the crime. On 7 December 2019, a memorial was held for the victims by relatives of the Hoti in the USA.

On 25 March 1919, the Kosovo Committee sent a report in French to the British Foreign office reporting that between 17–23 February 1919, Serbo-Montenegrin troops massacred the population of Plav and Gusinje. The Yugoslav authorities massacred 333 women, children, and elderly men by March of 1919.

In the month of February in 1917, Serbo-Montenegrin troops massacred 700 Albanians in Rožaje and 800 in the region of Gjakova, and used artillery to destroy 15 villages in Rugova.

On 15 December 1919, a Montenegrin detachment of Chetniks tried to disarm an Albanian tradesmen in the village of Podgur, which resulted in 138 houses being burned down and 400 being pillaged. Additionally, women, children, and elderly men were massacred.

=== Reports and casualties ===
The Swiss paper La Jeune République published an article on 25 September 1921, by Louis Rochard, mentioning the Yugoslav atrocities on the Albanian population. In June 1919, the Italian Commander Piacentini sent a telegram reporting that the Serbian troops "burned villages and massacred women and children".

According to the Albanian newspaper "Dajti" from 7 November 1924, and data retrieved from the Archives of the National Defense Committee of Kosovo, between 1918 and 1921, multiple massacres have occurred against the Albanian population.

Under the orders of commander Petrović and prefect Lukić, the village of Dubnica was surrounded and burned on 10 February 1924. The Yugoslav authorities massacred 25 people: ten women, eight children under eight-years, and six men.

The United States Department of State reported widespread massacres in Montenegro in May of 1919. Information was obtained by Albanian refugees in Shkodër, collected by Lieutenant Colonel Sherman Miles. The massacred had ended and Montenegro was "entirely cleared" of Albanians two months prior to his visit to the province. According to Albanian refugees, around 30,000 Albanians were killed in Montenegro by May 1919. The British Mission in Shkodër, however, placed this figure at 18,000–25,000.

On 18 April 1919, U.S. Secretary of State Robert Lansing wrote to British Secretary of State for Foreign Affairs Lord Balfour that "Gusinje, Plav, Peja, Gjakova, Podjur and Roshji, have been scenes of terrorism and murder by Serbian troops and Serbian agents, whose policy appears to be extermination of the Albanian inhabitants of the region".

In July 1919 the French consul in Skopje reported 9 massacres with 30,000–40,000 victims and that the Albanian primary schools had been closed down again and replaced by Serbian schools.

Around 35,000 Albanians fled to Shkodër as a result of the atrocities. According to Sabrina P. Ramet, approximately 12,000 Albanians were killed in Kosovo between 1918 and 1921, which coincides with the Albanian claim that 12,346 people were killed. More than 6,000 Albanians were killed by Yugoslav forces in January and February in 1919. Around 2,000 'Albanian patriots' were killed in Kosovo between 1919 and 1924. This number rose to 3,000 between 1924 and 1927.

According to Kosovo Albanian politician Haki Demolli, 80,000 Albanians were "exterminated" in the Kingdom of Yugoslavia by 1940.

== Demographics ==
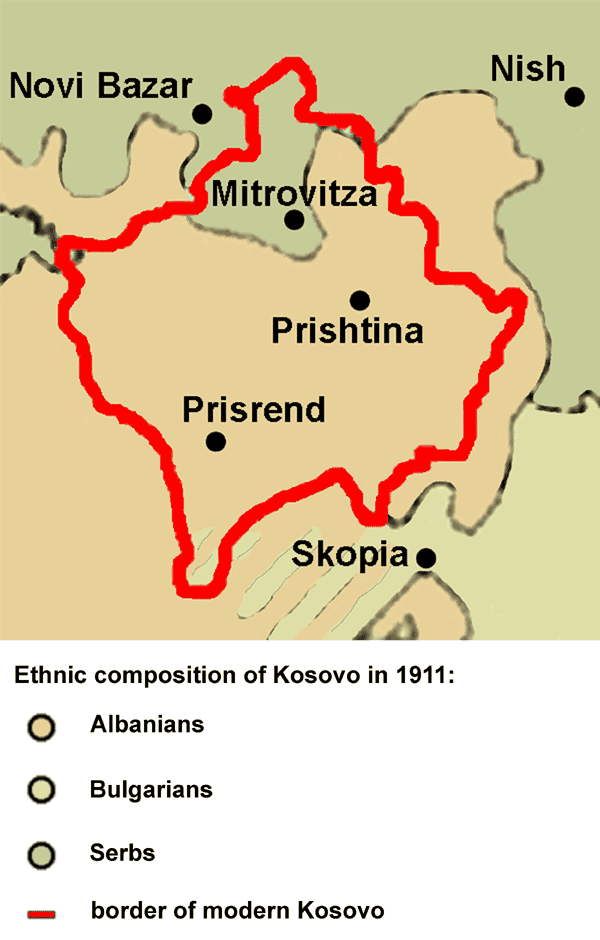
Ethnic composition of Kosovo in 1911, with the modern border of Kosovo superimposed.

The table shows the total number of registered settlers in each Kosovo county:

Colonisation of Kosovo
Regional centre	Number of colonists
Ferizaj/Uroševac	15,381
Gjakova/Đakovica	15,824
Prizren	3,084
Peja/Peć	13,376
Mitrovica	429
Vushtrri/Vučitrn	10,169
Total	58,263

The government associated colonisation with improving the agricultural sector and implemented policies such as the Agrarian Reform. It was a settlement plan to encourage Serb and Montenegrin settlers from other parts of Yugoslavia to resettle in Kosovo through preferential treatment of land and financial incentives such as tax exemptions to strengthen the Slavic element. Settlers and their families originating from anywhere within the country or overseas were allowed to settle in the area and, once there, land could only be obtained from the local district where they resided. The families of settlers were each granted some 5 hectares of land that became their property after 10 years. Settlers could gain an additional 2–5 hectares of land if there were multiple males within a family that were 16 and older. Albanian land was illegally confiscated and often through expropriations, whereas Serb settlers gained possession of prime land. From 1918 to 1940, the government expropriated 154,287 acres and distributed it among the mainly Serb settler population and kept 57,704 acres for use by the military, government schools, police and for other agencies of the state.

Other aims of the colonisation policy were to curb emigration by citizens from Yugoslavian Montenegro and Serbia to North America through offers of free land grants. The state wanted to punish Albanian Kachak rebels by expropriating and assigning their properties to the settler population. Addressing security problems, state authorities placed settlers in strategic locations. Other parts of the Serbianisation policy in Kosovo included establishing an effective government administration and refusing autonomous Albanian cultural development in the region. The Serb settlers were viewed as "foreigners" and "robbers" by Kosovan Albanians and local Serbs were apathetic to their presence. The arrival of Serb settlers to Kosovo affected the stable communal relations that existed between local Albanians and Serbs which resulted in conflict. The dobrovoljac willingly complied with the government who used them for the purposes of monitoring and intimidating local Albanians. Kosovo exceeded Vardar Macedonia in the amount of colonies it contained and their success rate was due to high quality land, water availability and good climate.

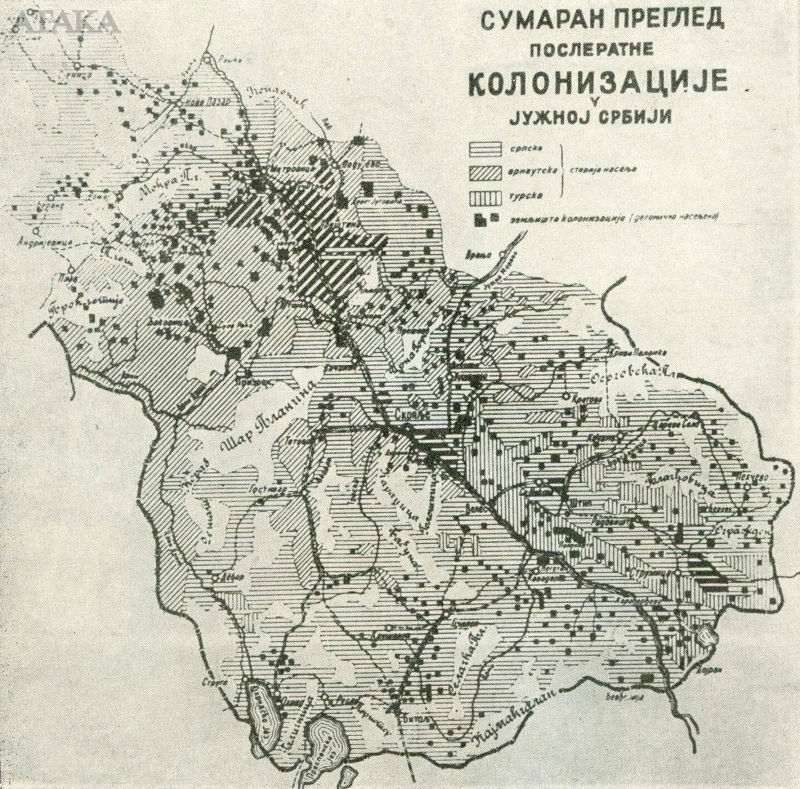
Serbian colonisation in Kosovo and Vardar Macedonia between 1920 and 1930. Colonised areas are in thick hatched black lines and colonised settlements are shown as black squares

Between 1918 and 1923, as a result of state policies 30,000 and 40,000 mainly Muslim Albanians migrated to the Turkish regions of İzmir and Anatolia. Apart from the conflict between the Kosovar Albanian Kachak resistance movement and Yugoslav authorities, other motivations for Albanian migration to Turkey were over land confiscations and their redistribution to Serb colonists. Yugoslav authorities viewed Albanians as a hostile population and preferred to reduce their presence in Yugoslavia, whereas Turkey wanted to repopulate areas of Anatolia that had been emptied of its previous Orthodox Greek speaking and Turkish speaking Christians during the population exchange of 1923. The Albanian population was encouraged to leave the region, as they were perceived to be immigrants in need of repatriation to either Turkey, Albania or expected to assimilate within Yugoslavia.

By the mid-1920s, large numbers of Albanian refugees were present in Turkey and an understanding had arisen with Albania to cooperate and stem Albanian migration from Yugoslavia that decreased substantially during the remainder of the decade. An arrangement between Turkey and Albania allowed Albanians arriving from Yugoslavia to Turkey the option of migrating to Albania. Turkey attempted to resettle Albanians in eastern Anatolia within areas such as Yozgat, Elazığ, and Diyarbakır, whereas many Albanians eventually settled in Eskişehir, Kocaeli, Tekirdağ, İzmir, Bursa and Istanbul. From 1925 onward Yugoslavia sought an agreement with Turkey to allow for the migration of Muslims and Albania was concerned that it entailed the removal of Albanians from the Balkans for intended resettlement in depopulated parts of Turkey. Turkey reiterated to Albania its disinterest in Albanians from Yugoslavia coming to Anatolia and stated that the matter mainly related to ethnic Turks of Vardar Macedonia.

The intent of the colonisation policy attempted to achieve specific political and national aims. To restore order, Đorđo Krstić, a Supreme Court judge was placed in charge of overseeing the colonisation process during 1927–1928 as Senior Commissioner for Agriculture. His reflections of the time published in a book described colonisation as a "cultural and economic task of a national character" that had a particular focus on Kosovo, due to public security concerns and the "important factor" for the "nationalisation and assimilation of these regions". Additional aims entailed serbianising urban centres through "nationalisation" and development, increasing hygiene standards in rural areas and targeting "patriarchal and primitive" modes of life and work. Krstić outlined that these measures aimed for a fastened process and complete "rebirth of south Serbia". He described colonisation as a success within the Kosovo and Skopje regions and less so in other areas due to "incompetence", poor leadership, lack of trained personnel, ad hoc and speedy measures, legal issues and so on. Krstić wrote that in the early years of colonisation, settlers did not receive support from the state and instead it was the American Mission and English Society of Friends of Serbia that funded homes for the colonists and procured equipment. Due to a lack of state assistance toward most settlers, part of that population went back to their place of origin. Krstić stated that another significant goal of colonisation was to assimilate Albanians of the Kosovo region, a task reserved for settlers to undertake.

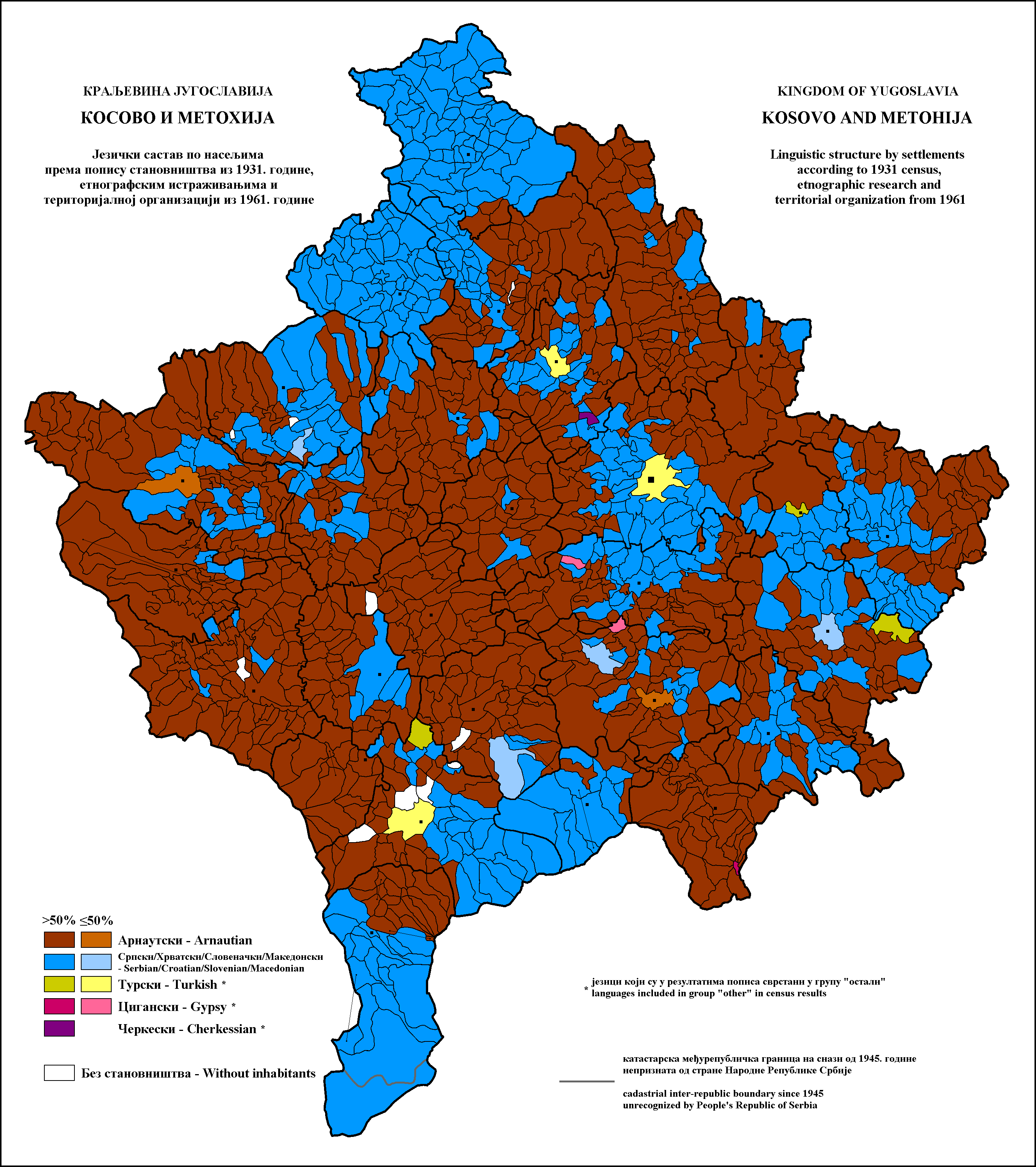
Linguistic structure of Kosovo by settlements 1931. Brown – Albanian; Blue – Serbian and other south Slavic; Yellow – Turkish, Pink – Romani; Purple – Circassian

A memorandum was written and submitted to the League of Nations in 1930 by three Albanian Catholic priests. The document gave a detailed account of the situation in Kosovo regarding state policies of property expropriation, forced migration, removal of Albanian municipal staff, limitations on dress and Albanian education and grievances against Serb paramilitary formations. By the 1930s, Serbianisation efforts and attempts at increasing the Serb population had failed as the Yugoslav census (1931) showed Albanians were 62 percent of the Kosovan population. Colonisation had managed to partially change the demographic situation in Kosovo and the share of Albanians had decreased from 65 percent (289,000) in 1921 to 61 percent (337,272) in 1931 and Serbs increased from 28 percent (114,000) to 32 percent (178,848). State authorities attempted to decrease the Albanian population through "forced migration", a process that grew during the decade.

The second phase of colonisation began in 1931, when the Decree on the Colonisation of the Southern Regions was issued on 11 July. The colonisation was regulated with decrees (1919 and 1931) and laws (1922, 1931 and 1933), while the Ministry for Agrarian Reform (that is, the High Agrarian Trustee Office in Skopje) and the controversial Alliance of Agrarian Cooperatives of Southern Serbia were in charge of its implementation. This phase of colonisation was considered unsuccessful because only 60 to 80 thousand people (some 17–20 thousand families) showed a willingness to become settlers and gained land, of whom many failed to follow through.

Throughout the 1930s, anti-Albanian sentiment existed in the country and solutions for the Kosovo question were put forward that involved large-scale deportation. In 1933, the Turkish foreign minister Tevfik Rüştü Aras made several visits to the Yugoslav Foreign Ministry in Belgrade and discussed the deportation of Muslims from the area of Yugoslavia that had been designated as South Serbia to Anatolia. Foreign ministers Aras and the Yugoslav Milan Stojadinović after five years of negotiations signed a convention regarding the migration of Muslim Turks to Turkey.

The agreement referred to the proposed relocation of 40,000 families during 1939–1944 in accordance with regulations and requirements such as being fluent in Turkish, exclusion of Romani and targeting municipalities in Kosovo and western Vardar Macedonia for the migration process. It envisioned the emigration of 200,000 Muslims from Kosovo and Macedonia that included Albanians, Turks and others. Rural communities were the main targets of the measures and properties of deported people were to be liquidated in Yugoslavia. The journey to Anatolia from the port of Thessaloniki would be funded mainly by Turkey with a joint Turkish-Yugoslav commission monitoring the situation. Archival and printed documentation from the era show the agreement to have been a misleading and deceptive text in its written composition and intent, as the outcome was for the removal of the Albanian population to Turkey. Turkish President Mustafa Kemal Atatürk met with Yugoslav authorities as the bilateral convention was negotiated and later he presented the agreement to the Turkish Assembly for ratification. Five months prior to the death of Atatürk, the Turkish Assembly during July 1938 refused to ratify the agreement and with the onset of the Second World War, the matter was not reopened.

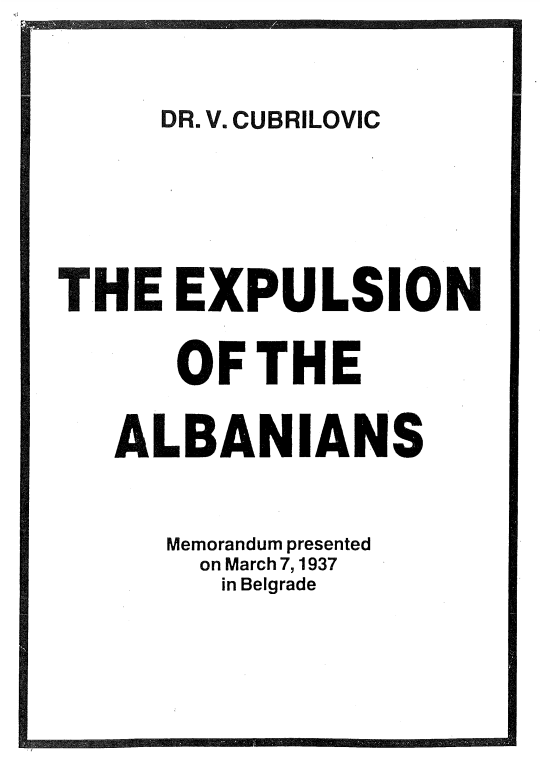
Memorandum presented on 7 March 1937 in Belgrade

In 1935, a document outlined methods the government planned to undertake toward expelling Albanians from Yugoslavia that differed from measures such as violence and eviction through force between 1912 and 1915.

The issue of Muslims, their expulsion and the Albanian problem was discussed at an interministerial meeting attended by members of the military and state in 1935. Ilija Milkić, a representative from the Foreign Affairs Ministry described that sizable numbers of "compact" Albanian inhabited areas along the Albanian border "represent an important national and military problem". Milkić stated that the focus should be on Albanians, as sending them to Albania became unfeasible due to financial and political issues in the country that resulted in rejecting newcomers. Suspicions were held that Albania did not want more Albanians to leave Yugoslavia as to keep future territorial claims active. Milkić preferred not to have any Muslim Slavs leave the state for Turkey or Turks as both communities were not perceived as problematic. He suggested that "to crush the compactness of Albanians", Serb families ought to be settled in Albanian villages and Milkić called for "cleaning the border zone from Albanians completely. Proposed measures included the purchase of Albanian property, assisting Albanians to the Yugoslav border or to Thessaloniki, pressuring them through financial means, placename changes, a public employment ban, forced labour and compulsory military enrollment.

Serbian intellectual Vaso Čubrilović viewed the colonisation programme as unsuccessful. He wrote a memorandum and presented it at the Serbian Cultural Club (May 1937) to an audience of intellectuals, prominent military personnel and politicians who were influential in politics and held sway over public opinion. The text proposed the expulsion of Albanians, a population Čubrilović perceived as a demographic, territorial and security concern for the state and Slavs within the wider area.

In our examination of colonisation in the south, we hold the view that the only effective means of solving this problem is the mass expulsion of the Albanians. Gradual colonisation has had no success in our country, nor in other countries for that matter. If the state wishes to intervene in favour of its own people in the struggle for land, it can only be successful by acting brutally.

— Vaso Čubrilović, Memorandum

The document was not selected as policy by the state, nor was it translated or published at the time and it remained the personal view of Čubrilović that was presented to a non-government organisation. Nevenka Tromp states that the memorandum "did reveal the pattern of thought" that existed at the time toward altering the demographics of Kosovo as a solution to maintain Serb rule in the area.

=== Aftermath: World War Two ===
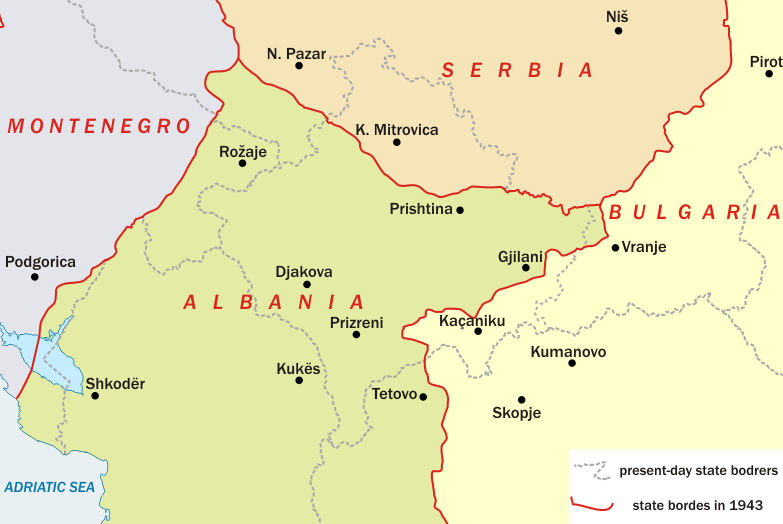
Kosovo in 1941

During World War II, a large area of Kosovo was attached to Italian controlled Albania. The Italians were viewed as liberators by Kosovo Albanians whom sought to redress the past policies of colonisation and slavisation and power relations between Albanians and Serbs were overturned in the new administration. It resulted in local Serbs and other Serbs that had arrived previously as part of the colonisation plan to be targeted by groups of armed Albanians. Campaigns aimed toward Serbs followed and included the destruction of property, killings, murders and deportations. The majority of Montenegrin and Serb settlers consisting of bureaucrats and dobrovoljac fled from Kosovo to Axis occupied Serbia and Montenegro. One estimate places the number of Serbs that were forced to leave at 70,000-100,000. Serbian historiography estimates that some 100,000 Serbs left Kosovo during 1941–1945.

==== Historiography ====
Serbian historiography and Serb elites have expressed similar sentiments that colonisation was a failure due to state mismanagement and use of ineffective Western methods in Kosovo and that different solutions were needed toward addressing "this problem". According to some Serbian historiography, the colonisation was an attempt to correct "the historical injustice", given the belief that the ethnic structure of Kosovo was constantly being changed in favor of Albanians, since the end of the seventeenth century. The Serbian Academy of Sciences and Arts commented that "in the ethnic plan only partially was the structure corrected" and that disruptions of the process disadvantaged Serbs.

In Yugoslavia, the Albanian intelligentsia of the communist period stated that a policy for the recolonisation of Kosovo and its repopulation with Montenegrins and Serbs was undertaken by the "Greater Serbian bourgeoisie". They described that it included the removal of Albanians through various measures such as deportation, land confiscations, "permanent terror" and an agrarian policy that was exploitative. Examples they highlighted included the 1938 Yugoslav-Turkish convention and the memorandum by Vaso Čubrilović.

In the 1980s Albanian scholars participated in historical debates on Kosovo and its identity. A book by historian Dimitrije Bogdanović titled Knjiga o Kosovu was a response to those debates and it became widely used among the Serbian intelligentsia as a source and reference on the Kosovo question. As one of a number of revisionist publications at the time, Bogdanović aimed to depict the Serbs as the only victims of past persecution and to counter Albanian narratives of victimisation regarding the Yugoslav interwar period of Serb rule. He stated that Serbs too emigrated during the interwar period. Bogdanović described that local officials were responsible for violations, abuses and expropriation of Albanian land as they deviated from government policy. The intent of land confiscations from Albanian inhabitants for the construction of Serb settlements was to be substituted for other land, yet local authorities failed to inform Albanians about their rights and it resulted in expulsions from properties without previous notice. Jasna Dragović-Soso wrote that Albanians experienced "real discrimination", but that the claim by Bogdanović that Albanian scholarship had considerably overstated the negative conditions of the interwar era "seems reasonable".

However, Arben Qirezi writes that data from the interwar period regarding the region shows a different situation to the one presented by Bogdanović. Qirezi describes that state policy aimed at creating equality, in addition to altering the demographic structure, was sidelined by the government as the constitution was suspended and Kosovo was administered under military control in 1912. The region was dealt with differently as a special territory where the state applied particular measures in Kosovo. Serbian Prime Minister Nikola Pašić became a very large landowner in the country due to expropriation of Albanian land in Kosovo and other areas. Qirezi states that the main goal of colonisation did not only entail creating equality between locals and settlers, but that it also included demographic changes whereby authorities in complaints stated that the colonisation by Serbs was a failure and that success could only be achieved through the expulsion of Albanians.

Based in Ankara, the data gathered for 1919–1940 by the Yugoslav Legation shows 215,412 Albanians migrated to Turkey, whereas data collected by the Yugoslav army shows that until 1939, 4,046 Albanian families went to live in Albania. For 1918 to 1921, Sabrina Ramet cites the estimate that the expulsions of Albanians reduced their numbers from around 800,000 – 1,000,000 within Kosovo down to some 439,500. Between 1923 and 1939, some 115,000 Yugoslav citizens migrated to Turkey and both Yugoslavian and Turkish sources state that Albanians composed most of that population group. Albanian scholars from Albania and Kosovo place the number of Albanian refugees from 300,000 upward into the hundreds of thousands and state that they left Yugoslavia due to duress. Other estimates given by scholars outside the Balkans for Kosovan Albanians who emigrated during 1918–1941 are between 90,000 and 150,000 or 200,000–300,000. To date, access is unavailable to the Turkish Foreign Ministry archive regarding this issue and as such the total numbers of Albanians arriving to Turkey during the interwar period are difficult to determine.

== After WWII ==
=== Third phase: Communist Yugoslavia ===
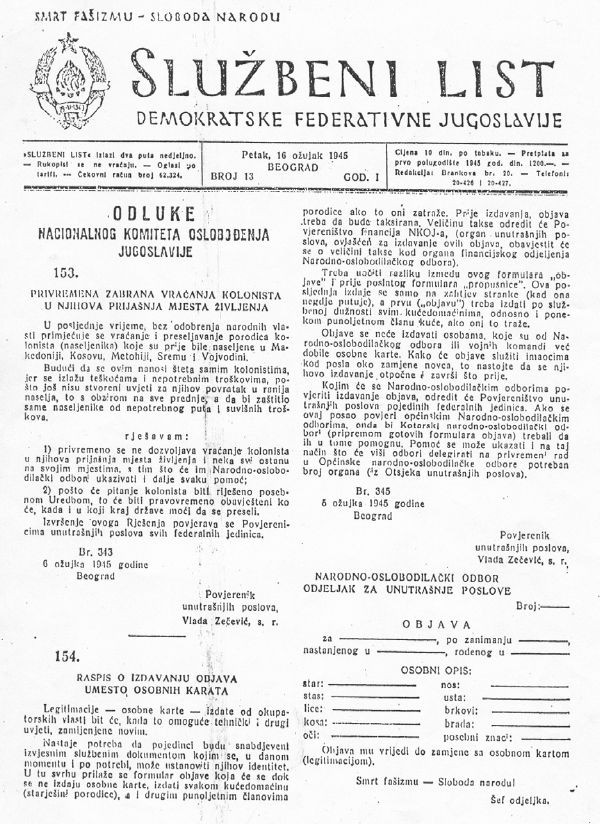
In 1945, the decree temporarily banning the return of the colonists was published in the government periodical Službeni list

Following the Second World War and establishment of communist rule in Yugoslavia, the colonisation programme was discontinued, as President Tito wanted to avoid sectarian and ethnic conflicts. Tito enacted a temporary decree in March 1945 that banned the return of colonists, which included some Chetniks and the rest that left during the war seeking refuge. Serbian nationalists protested the decision as Serb settlers were forbidden to return to Kosovo. Two weeks later Tito issued another decree and followed it with a law in August 1945 that permitted a conditional return for a minority of the colonists. In total, cases of return numbered 11,168, with 4,829 cases confirmed, 5,744 cases partially confirmed alongside 595 cases being denied. A small proportion of the previous colonist population came back to Kosovo and repossessed land, with a greater part of their number (4,000 families) later leaving for other areas of Yugoslavia. Taken from 1912 onward, confiscated land, numbering 16,000 out of a total of 200,000 hectares was returned to local former owners.

After the Second World War and the Yugoslavia-Albania split, Yugoslav authorities attempted to downplay links between Albanians of Albania and Kosovo and to implement a policy of "Turkification" that encouraged Turkish language education and emigration to Turkey among Albanians. In 1953, an agreement which revived the 1938 convention was reached between Tito and Mehmet Fuat Köprülü, the foreign minister of Turkey that promoted the emigration of Albanians to Anatolia. Forced migration to Turkey increased and numbers cited by Klejda Mulaj for 1953–1957 are 195,000 Albanians leaving Yugoslavia and for 1966, some 230,000 people. Historian Noel Malcolm placed the number of Albanians leaving for Turkey at 100,000 between 1953 and 1966.

Factors involved in the upsurge of migration were intimidation and pressure toward the Albanian population to leave through a campaign headed by Yugoslav police chief Aleksandar Ranković that officially was stated as aimed at curbing Albanian nationalism. Kosovo under the control of Ranković was viewed by Turkey as the individual that would implement "the Gentleman's Agreement". At the same time, a new phase of colonisation occurred in the region as Montenegrin and Serb families were installed in Kosovo. The situation ended in 1966 with the removal of Ranković from his position. During the late communist period of Yugoslavia, the colonisation and demographic change attempts and other measures undertaken in times of Serb control was highlighted by Albanians.

=== Fourth phase: The Milošević government ===
In the 1980s the Kosovo question was a topic among some Serb writers. Figures included academic Dimitrije Bogdanović who defended and upheld interwar Yugoslavia's policy of Albanian migration to Turkey and the attempted Serbian colonisation "to redress the ethnic and national balance" toward making local conditions favourable for Serbs. Vojislav Šešelj, a Serb nationalist made calls for 360,000 Albanians to be deported from Kosovo. Writer Vuk Drašković was in agreement with Šešelj's sentiments and added that "a special fund" was needed "to finance the repopulation of Kosovo by Serbs". The autonomy of Kosovo was scaled down in 1989 and in 1990, Serbia gained control of the local police and abolished the province's parliament and government. A new constitution in Serbia rescinded the autonomous status of Kosovo and Vojvodina that had been granted under the 1974 federal Yugoslav constitution. In 1990 President Slobodan Milošević had a plan to colonise Kosovo with 100,000 Serbs, though the plan did not get fulfilled. Milošević thought that the re-colonisation of Kosovo would start Serbia's economic growth.

By 1992, the situation in Kosovo deteriorated and politicians from both sides were at an impasse toward solutions for the future of the region. Concerns increased among Serbs and an organisation was created called the Serb Block for Colonizing Kosovo in Pristina that aimed to get state officials based in Belgrade to raise the Serb population within Kosovo. As such, the state made available loans for building apartments and homes along with employment opportunities for Montenegrins and Serbs that chose to relocate to the region. In March 1992, nearly 3,000 people from the Serb minority in Albania had emigrated to Kosovo after accepting the government offer. At the time, the government under Milošević pursued colonisation amidst a situation of financial difficulties and limited resources. Following 1989, the government according to some estimates used over 6 billion dollars to keep Kosovo in a state of peace.

Laws were passed by the parliament of Serbia that sought to change the power balance in Kosovo relating to the economy, demography and politics. The Serbs replaced Albanians in government jobs and the police, whereas Serbian was made the only official language in the region. Serb policies and their implementation aimed at altering the population structure of Kosovo were cited by the International Helsinki Federation for Human Rights in a 1993 report called From Autonomy to Colonization: Human Rights Violations in Kosovo 1989–1993. At the time, for Serb nationalists the process of Serbianisation entailed the resettlement of Serbs to Kosovo and limiting the favorable demographic position Albanians held. The Serbian media and education system perspective of history held that Kosovo was for the Serbs and the region did not belong to the Albanians.

The interwar period works of nationalist writer Vaso Čubrilović became popular in Serbia during the 1990s and their content called for the dislocation of Albanians through mass resettlement. In 1995, Vojislav Šešelj wrote in the publication Velika Srbija (Greater Serbia) a memorandum that outlined the Serbianisation of Kosovo. Šešelj called for violence and expulsion against Albanians and their leadership with aims toward discrediting them within Western public opinion. The Serbian Association of Professors and Scientists held a conference in Pristina (1995) that discussed concerns about the high Kosovo Albanian birthrate. As a solution, they proposed that 400,000 Serbian refugees in Yugoslavia be resettled in Kosovo and that the government introduce a "family planning law". Serb academic Veselin Đuretić opposed family planning measures and suggested the deportation of Albanians to Albania and the resettlement of empty houses in Kosovo with Serbs. During this period, varied definitions of terms such as "ethnic cleaning" and "genocide" were employed in the country to condone removing Kosovo Albanians through force and supplanting them with a Serbian population.

Following similar themes the parliament of Serbia on 11 January 1995 passed the Decree for Colonisation of Kosovo of the Federal Republic of Yugoslavia. It outlined government benefits for Serbs who desired to go and live in Kosovo with loans to build homes or purchase other dwellings and offered free plots of land. Few Serbs took up the offer due to the worsening situation in Kosovo at the time.

Colonisation was attempted by settling Serbs in Kosovo that involved some Serbian refugees originating from Croatia and Bosnia. Around 10,000 Serb refugees from Krajina in Croatia and over 2000 from Bosnia were resettled in Kosovo, due to the Yugoslav Wars. In 1995, the government attempted to alter the ethnic balance of the region through the planned resettlement of 100,000, later reduced to 20,000 Serbian refugees from Krajina to Kosovo. Many countries reacted negatively to this plan and urged the Serbian government to cease the forced resettlement of Krajina Serbs to Kosovo. Some of the Serb refugees opposed going to Kosovo. In Babaloc and Junik, the government established shelter facilities for some 1,500 Serb refugees originating from Bosnia and Croatia.

In 1996, official government statistics placed the number of refugees in Kosovo at 19,000. After the outbreak of conflict in early 1997, an estimated 9,000 Serb refugees and 20,000 local Serbs left Kosovo. Most of the Serb refugees left thereafter and a few remained that increased tensions in the area. There were tense relations and instances of violent incidents between the Serb refugee population and local Albanians. As the conflict intensified Serb refugees from Krajina competed with Kosovo Albanian internally displaced persons for limited resources and living space in Pristina. In early 1997, the number of resettled Serb refugees in Kosovo was 4,000 and 6,000 in early 1999. Local Albanians opposed their presence.

Serbs selling property to Albanians was made illegal by the government and fines existed for Albanians that did not undertake their military service in Bosnia and Croatia. The government also made it difficult for Albanians living overseas to return and penalties existed for Albanian families that had more than a child, whereas Kosovo Serbs were rewarded for having multiple children. Serbianisation of the Kosovo economy also occurred with areas inhabited by Serbs receiving investment, new infrastructure and employment opportunities. Albanians overall were either excluded or had limited economic participation.

As the sociopolitical situation deteriorated, Kosovo Albanians numbering some 300,000 fled during this period for Western Europe. By 1997–1998, the failure of Kosovo Albanian political resistance and negotiations for a solution between both sides gave way to an armed conflict between the Kosovo Liberation Army and Serb forces. As the Kosovo conflict escalated, in 1999 the international community intervened to end hostilities through negotiations and later war. In January 1999, the Serb police and army initiated a planned offensive against Kosovo Albanians that involved the violent liquidation of assets aimed at their displacement and Serbianisation of the region. During the Kosovo war (March–June 1999), Serb forces expelled between 800,000 and 1,000,000 Albanians from Kosovo employing tactics such as confiscating personal documents to make it difficult or prevent any future return. Kosovo Albanians later returned following NATO intervention and the end of the war. Post-war, less than one hundred of the Serb refugees from Croatia remained in Kosovo, as they along with over half of the Serb and other non-Albanian population were expelled from the region.

== See also ==
- History of Kosovo
- Demographics of Kosovo
- Demographic history of Kosovo
- Expulsion of the Albanians (1877–1878)
- Massacres of Albanians in the Balkan Wars
- Massacres of Albanians in World War I
- Operation Horseshoe

== Sources ==
- Elsie, Robert (2002). Gathering clouds: the roots of ethnic cleansing in Kosovo and Macedonia. Peja: Dukagjini Balkan Books. ISBN 9781507882085.
