= Montenegro–Slovenia relations =

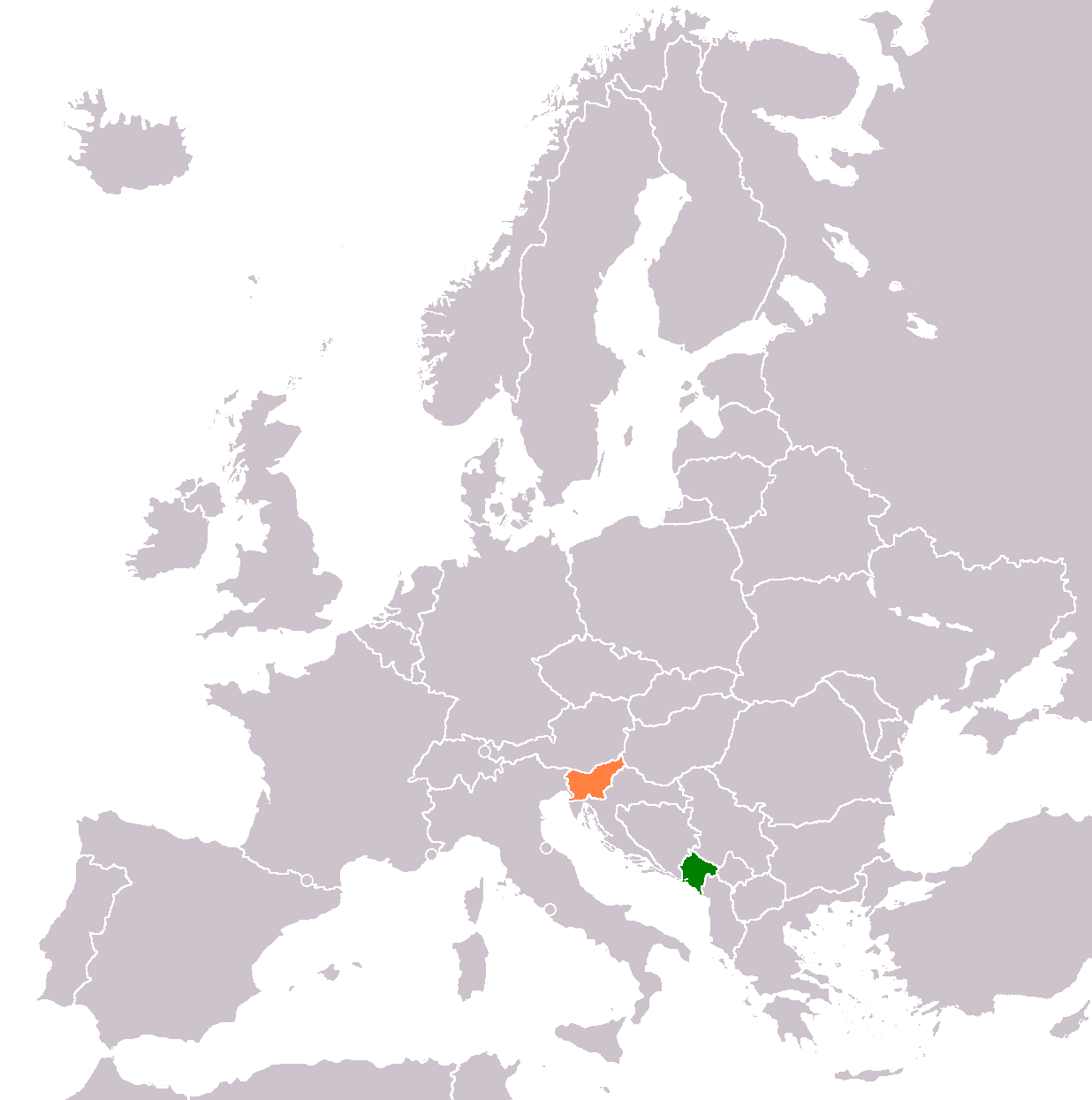

- Montenegro: Slovenia

Montenegro–Slovenia relations are foreign relations between the Montenegro and Slovenia. Until 1991, both countries were part of Yugoslavia. Slovenia recognized Montenegro's independence on June 20, 2006. Both countries established diplomatic relations on June 21, 2006. Montenegro has an embassy in Ljubljana. On June 23, 2006, Slovenia opened its embassy in Podgorica.

Both countries are full members of the Union for the Mediterranean, the Council of Europe, and NATO. Montenegro and Slovenia are security partners, cooperating in the Western Balkans Cyber Capacity Centre based in Podgorica, Montenegro, and the NATO mission in Latvia.

Montenegro is an EU candidate and Slovenia is an EU member. Slovenia supports Montenegro's candidature and assists in fulfilling its obligations from the European agenda.

== Resident diplomatic missions ==
- Montenegro has an embassy in Ljubljana.
- Slovenia has an embassy in Podgorica.

== See also ==
- Foreign relations of Montenegro
- Foreign relations of Slovenia
- Montenegrins of Slovenia
- Accession of Montenegro to the European Union
