= Montenero Funicular =

Cable railway line in Italy

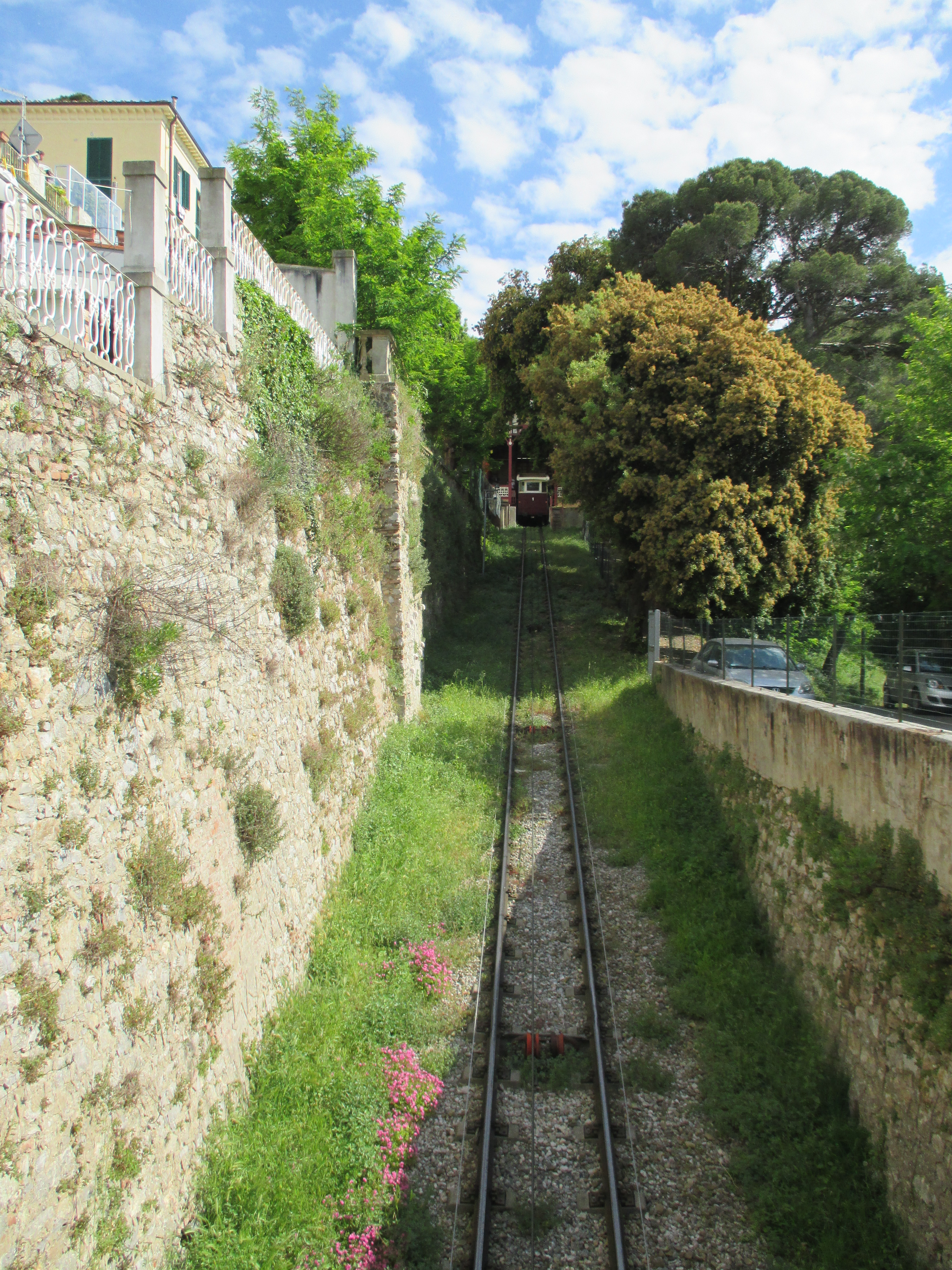
- The funicular near the high station

Overview
- Owner: Autolinee Toscane
- Area served: Montenero (Livorno)
- Locale: Livorno
- Transit type: Funicular
- Number of stations: 3
- Daily ridership: 685
- Annual ridership: 250,000

Operation
- Began operation: 1908
- Number of vehicles: 2

Technical
- Track gauge: 1,000 mm (3 ft 3 3/8 in)
- Minimum radius of curvature: 180 metres (590 ft)
- Average speed: 12.2 kilometres per hour (7.6 mph)

The Montenero Funicular is a funicular railway line connecting the two parts of the fraction of Montenero, Livorno in Italy.

== History ==
The project for the funicular begun in 1907, and it was opened on 19 August 1908. The line has been widely renovated in 1979.

== Description ==
The funicular has the lower Station in Piazza delle Carrozze (80 m), at the conclusion of the 2+ urban bus line, and the upper station is in Piazza del Santuario (190 m).

== Technical characteristics ==
Since the renovation in 1979 its electric supply is 48 KW direct current, coming from a solar power plant 0.5 km from the Sanctuary. The funicular has an inclined distance of 656 metres (2,152 ft) and covers a height difference of 110.9 metres (364 ft). The track has a lower station in Piazza delle Carrozze and a higher station in Piazza del Santuario. It consists of a single track, except from the central part, of approximately 20 metres, where it is doubled to allow the two carriages to pass each other. The route has three curves, with a radius between 180 and 250 metres.

== Current use ==
The funicular is currently run by Autolinee Toscane, as an integration of the urban bus network. It carries approximately 250,000 passengers per year, that is, an average of 685 per day.
