= Valle Benedetta =

- Frazione
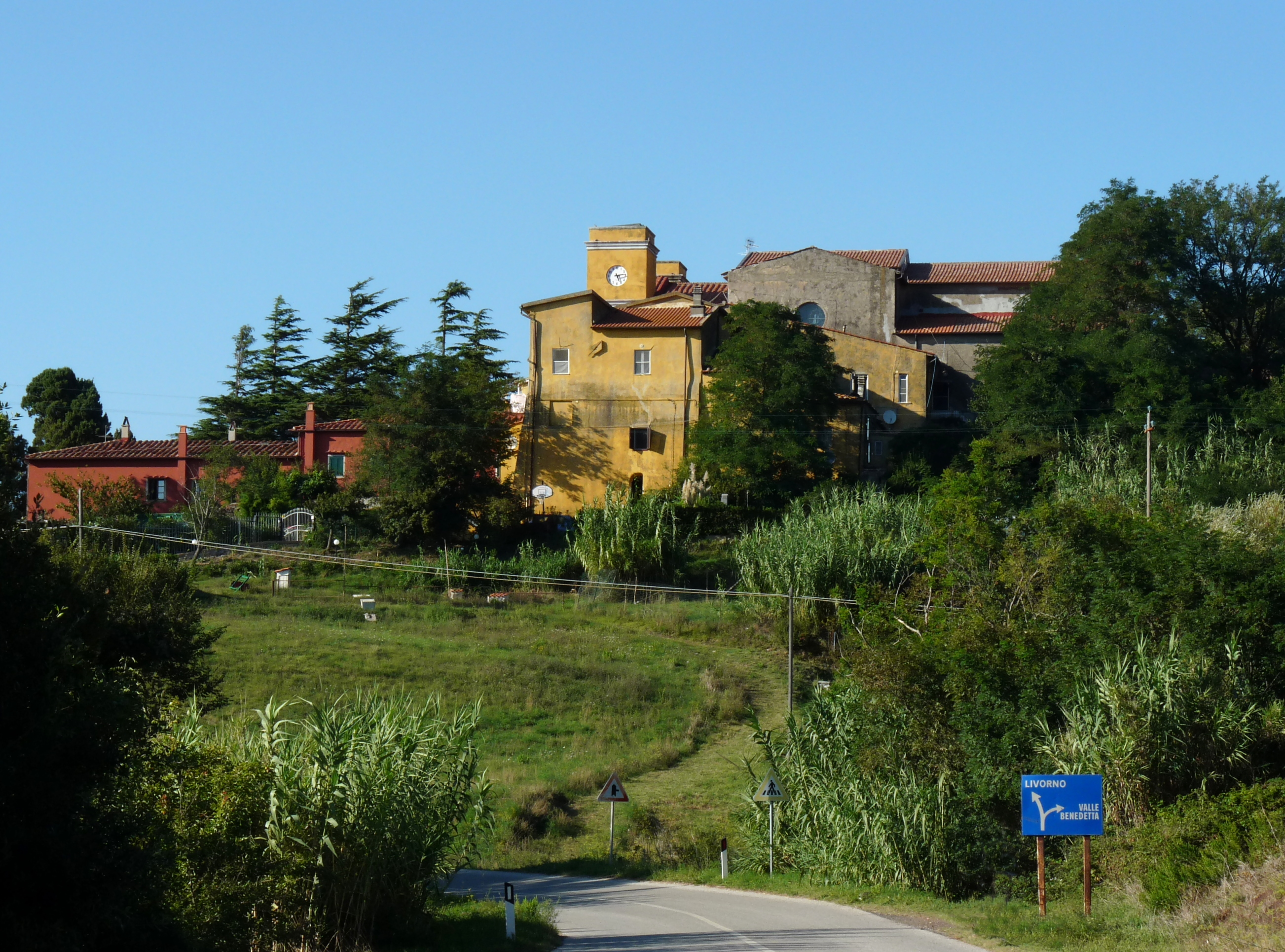
- The Church of S. Giovanni Gualberto and the village of Valle Benedetta

- Location of Valle Benedetta in Italy
- Country: Italy
- Region: Tuscany
- Province: Livorno (LI)
- Comune: Livorno
- Elevation: 320 m (1,050 ft)

Population
  - Total: 117
- Time zone: UTC+1 (CET)
  - Summer (DST): UTC+2 (CEST)

Valle Benedetta is a fraction of Livorno, Tuscany in Italy. It is situated in the Livorno Hills, near Poggio Lecceta at an altitude of approximately 320 metres (1,050 ft).

== History ==
In antiquity the area, inhospitable, wild, inhabited by wolves and frequented by bandits, was known, as certified by some documents of the first half of the XVI Century, as Valle d'Inferno (Valley of Hell). In the XVII Century the Vallombrosian Colombino Bassi, from Livorno, decided to establish a church intitulated to St. John Gualbert with annexed a monastery. Authorized by the grand duke Cosimo III de' Medici, he bought the land from the Pisan Francesco Lante. Cleared and levelled the land, on 20 May 1692 was laid the first stone. During the excavations notable archeological rests were found, including weapons, vases, coins and urns; they were donated to prince Ferdinando de' Medici. The complex, designed by architect Lorenzi from Livorno, was ultimated in 1697 and was entrusted to the Benedictine monks, from which the locality takes the current deniomination. In the meantime, in 1694, the road connecting Valle Benedetta with Livorno was opened, having been financed by a rich German merchant, Giovanni Antonio Huygens. Huygens also built a villa nearby, which has been destroyed during World War II. After he became Bishop of Pistoia and Prato, Bassi consecrated the Church on 5 June 1717. In 1742, Filippo Huygens, son of Giovanni Antonio, edificated some windmills not far from the Church, used for the grinding of grain produced in the region. In the same period Jewish merchant Angelo Visino, converted to Catholicism, build a house in the area established there with his family.

== Geography ==
The fraction is situated on the "Strada Provinciale 5 della Valle Benedetta" (Provincial Street 5, of Valle Benedetta), which connects the city of Livorno to Colognole, crossing the range of the Livorno Hills. It is served by public bus routes, managed by Autolinee Toscane.

== Places of interest ==
- Church of Saint John Gualbert
- Eremo di Santa Maria alla Sambuca
- Colognole aqueduct

== See also ==
- Livorno Hills
- Livorno
