= Montenegro de Cameros =

- Municipality
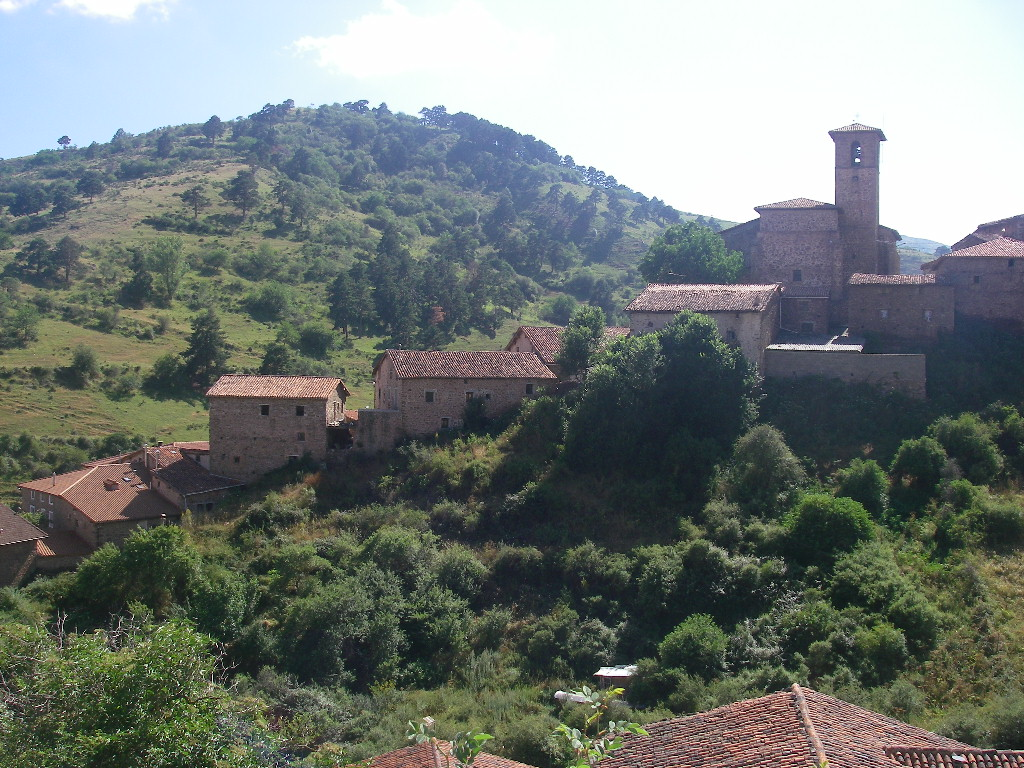
- View of Montenegro de Cameros

- Coat of arms

- Location in Spain. Montenegro de Cameros (Spain)
- Coordinates: 42°05′21″N 2°45′14″W
- Country: Spain
- Autonomous community: Castile and León
- Province: Soria
- Municipality: Montenegro de Cameros

Area
  - Total: 55 km^{2} (21 sq mi)

Population (2025-01-01)
  - Total: 43
  - Density: 0.78/km^{2} (2.0/sq mi)
- Time zone: UTC+1 (CET)
  - Summer (DST): UTC+2 (CEST)
- Website: Official website

Montenegro de Cameros is a municipality located in the midst of the Iberian System mountains, province of Soria, Castile and León, Spain. According to the 2004 census (INE), the municipality has a population of 99 inhabitants.
