= Jorge Montenegro =

Jorge Montenegro may refer to:

- Jorge Montenegro (shot putter) (born 1968), Cuban shot putter
- Jorge Luis Montenegro (born 1988), Ecuadorian cyclist
- Jorge Martín Montenegro (born 1983), Argentine cyclist
