= Bruno Montenegro =

Peruvian trans rights activist, film director (born 1991)

- Born: 1991 (age 34–35); Arequipa, Peru
- Education: National University of San Agustín
- Occupations: LGBTQ activist; film director

Bruno Montenegro Mamani (born 1991 in Arequipa, Peru) is a Peruvian film director and activist for the rights of trans people in Peru.

== Biography ==
Montenegro was born in 1991 in Arequipa, Peru. He studied communications at the National University of San Agustín in Arequipa (UNSA). He has developed his career as a filmmaker by participating in several audiovisual laboratories and in other productions as an editor.

As a transgender rights activist, Montenegro is the founder of Fraternidad Trans Masculina - Arequipa, as well as the LGBT Network of Arequipa.

In 2019, after having problems due to the use of his deadname in university classes, Montenegro managed to get the UNSA University Council to approve, through Resolution No. 0577-2019, the use of the social name of all transgender people in University administrative documents.

In 2020 Montenegro premiered his first film, Casarnos, a documentary short film about a lesbian couple who travel to Argentina, where same-sex marriage is legal, to get married.

In 2021, Montenegro was a jury member for the Gio Awards, given by the communications platform Crónicas de la Diversidad. That same year, his Identidad project, scripted by Montenegro and designed by Chechi Chávez, won the National Competition for Animation Projects. The short film, released in 2024, tells the story of Mariano, a trans man from Arequipa who decides to visit his grandparents in Chivay, a town where ancestral customs survive.

== Personal life ==
Montenegro is a trans man. He began his transition in 2017 when he made his gender identity public.

== Filmography ==
- Casarnos (short film, 2020)
- Identidad (short film, 2024)

== Awards and recognitions ==
In 2019, after achieving the recognition of the use of the social name of trans people by the National University of San Agustín, the Ministry of Justice and Human Rights awarded Montenegro the Human Rights Award, given by the Minister of Justice, Ana Teresa Revilla.

In 2020, Casarnos won the first prize as Best National Short Film at the Outfest Perú film festival.
