= Crnogorac (surname) =

Crnogorac a South Slavic surname literally meaning "Montenegrin" ( male person of Montenegrin ethnicity of Montenegrin citizenship). Notable people with the surname include:

- Andrija Crnogorac, Serbian professional basketball player
- Branislav Crnogorac, Bosnian judoka and judo trainer
- Dragan Crnogorac (war criminal), Bosnian Serb war criminal
- Dragan Crnogorac (politician), Croatian Serb politician
- Gradimir Crnogorac, Bosnian footballer
- Jovana Crnogorac, Serbian cyclist

== See also ==
- Vuk Crnogorac (Vuk the Montenegrin), legendary medieval Serbian vojvoda (military commander)
