= Crnogorka (dance) =

- Genre: Folk dance
- Time signature: 2/4
- Origin: Skopje, North Macedonia

Crnogorka (Црногорка) is a Macedonian oro from the Skopje region.

It is a vivid mixed man and woman dance with quick and small steps on half feet and lot of jumps. The dancers are holding hands and begin their dance in a position of a half circle. The dance rhythm is 2/4.

== See also ==
- Music of North Macedonia
