= Montenegrins of Slovenia =

Montenegrins of Slovenia Crnogorci u Sloveniji Црногорци у Словенији
- (Montenegro) (Slovenia)

Total population
- 2,667 (2002)

Languages
- Montenegrin; Slovene

Religion
- Serbian Orthodox, Montenegrin Orthodox

Related ethnic groups
- Serbs of Slovenia

Slovenian Montenegrins (Montenegrin: Slovenački Crnogorci) are a national minority in Slovenia. Until 1991, Montenegro and Slovenia were both constituent republics of the Socialist Federative Republic of Yugoslavia, and as such there was freedom of movement among nations.

According to the 2002 Slovenian census there are 2,667 ethnic Montenegrins in Slovenia.

== Notable people ==
- Žarko Đurišić, basketball scout, coach, and former player
- Bjanka Adžić Ursulov, costume and set designer
- Vinko Glanz, architect
- Milada Kalezić, actress
- Jan Plestenjak, singer
- Boris Popovič, politician and Mayor of Koper
- Velimir Vulikić, doctor and publicist
- Senidah, singer-songwriter

== See also ==
- Montenegro–Slovenia relations
- Montenegrin diaspora
- Ethnic groups in Slovenia
