= Montenegro (province) =

Province in the Kingdom of Serbs, Croats and Slovenes

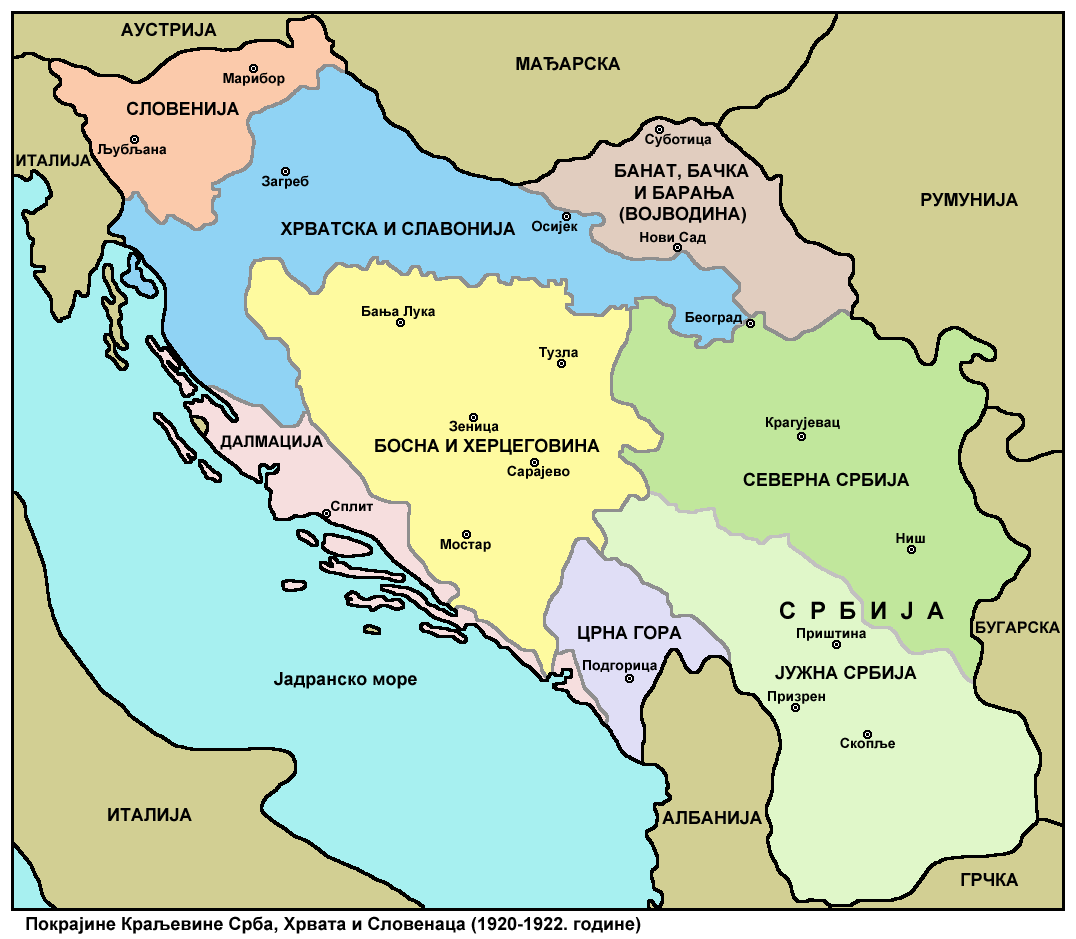
Province of Montenegro (purple) within the Kingdom of Serbs, Croats and Slovenes (later Yugoslavia)

Province of Montenegro (Serbo-Croatian: Покрајина Црна Гора / Pokrajina Crna Gora) was a temporary province in the Kingdom of Serbs, Croats and Slovenes. It existed in the period from Yugoslav unification at the end of 1918 to the implementation of the new territorial organization, which began in 1922. The abolition of the temporary provinces and the introduction of the area as new administrative units were envisaged by the Vidovdan Constitution of 1921 and the relevant regulations, which were adopted in 1922, after which the constitutional provisions were drafted in practice.

== History ==
By the decision of the Podgorica Assembly of 28 November 1918, the Executive Committee was elected, which had the role of a provisional government in the territory of the previously abolished Kingdom of Montenegro. The board consisted of: Stevo Vukotić, Spasoje Piletić, Lazar Damjanović, Risto Jojić and President Marko Daković. In April 1919, the power in the province was taken over by the royal commissioner Ivo Pavićević. The reorganization of the administration was carried out after the adoption of the Decree on the division of the country into areas from 1922, which prescribed the creation of Zeta Banovina, with a wider spatial scope. District Chiefs was Ljubomir Glomazić for Cetinje, Risto Vujačić for Bar and Mujo Sočica for Nikšić.

== Administrative divisions ==
Territory of Montenegro was divided into six areas, with centers in Cetinje, Andrijevica, Bar, Kolašin, Nikšić and Podgorica.

== Literature ==
- Antonić, Slobodan (1999). "Stranački i društveni rascepi u Crnoj Gori". Sociologija: Časopis za sociologiju, socijalnu psihologiju i socijalnu antropologiju. 41 (2): 165–186.
- Vujović, Dimitrije (1981). Црногорски федералисти 1919-1929. Титоград: Црногорска академија наука и умјетности.
- Grupković, Dragutin, ed. (1988). Uporedni pregled rezultata popisa od 1921-1981. godine. Beograd: Savezni zavod za statistiku.
- Dimić, Ljubodrag (2001). Историја српске државности. Vol. 3. Нови Сад: Огранак САНУ.
- Mrđen, Snježana (2002). "Narodnost u popisima: Promјenljiva i nestalna kategorija". Stanovništvo. 40: 77–103.
- Stamatović, Aleksandar (2007). "Национални идентитет зеленаша и црногорских федералиста 1918-1941". Политичка ревија. 6 (1): 119–139.
