= Livorno Hills =

Hill range in Tuscany, Italy

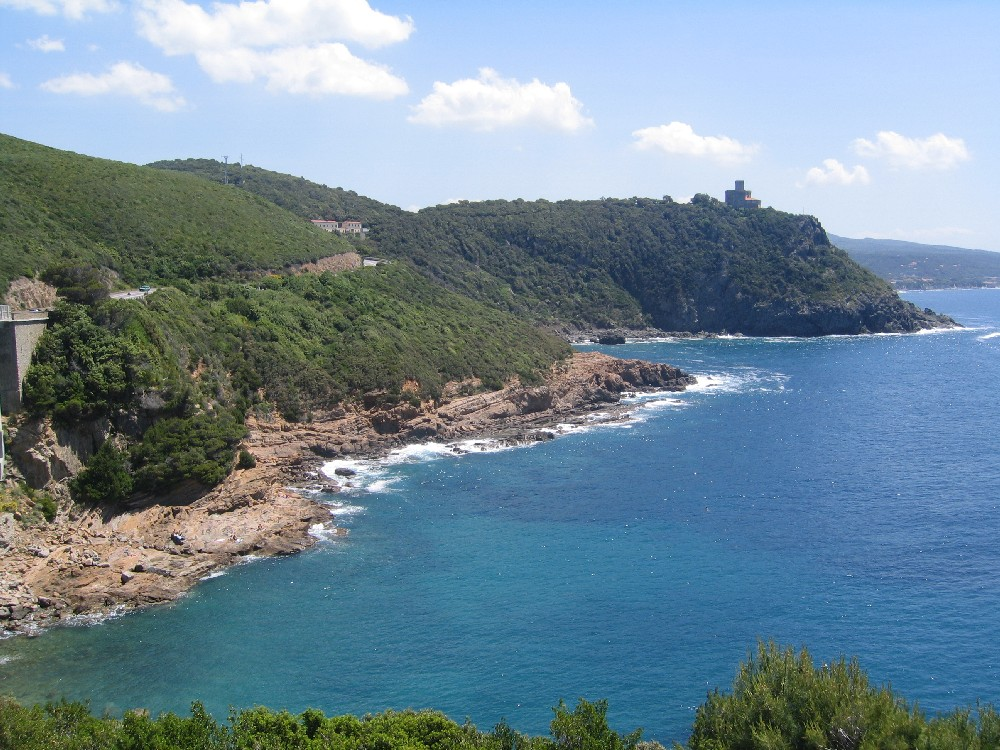
- The Romito coast and Castel Sonnino

Highest point
- Peak: Poggio Lecceta
- Elevation: 462 m (1,516 ft)
- Coordinates: 43°31′15″N 10°24′58″E

Dimensions
- Length: 23 km (14 mi) northwest to southeast
- Width: 11 km (6.8 mi) southwest to northeast
- Area: 246 km^{2} (95 mi^{2})

Naming
- Native name: Colline Livornesi (Italian)

Geography
- Country: Italy
- Region: Tuscany

The Livorno Hills (also known as Leghorn Hills, or in Italian as the Colline Livornesi) is a hill range in Tuscany, included in the municipalities of Livorno, Collesalvetti and Rosignano Marittimo, and in the Province of Livorno. Due to its vicinity to the sea, the average height is quite low. The highest mountain is Poggio Lecceta ("Holms Knoll"), with an elevation of 462 m (1,516 feet) on the sea level. Other peaks, such as the Monte Maggiore ("Mount Major") or Poggio ai tre mulini ("Knoll of the Three Mills") are over 400 m (1,300 feet) high. Important villages on the Livorno Hills are the fractions of Valle Benedetta (Livorno), Nibbiaia and Gabbro (Rosignano Marittimo), and Rosignano Marittimo too, which is situated on the homonymous knoll at a height of 142 m (466 feet). Many streams, although the weather is quite dry in the summer, run down from the Leghorn Hills. The longest is known as Rio Ugione, on the border between Livorno and Collesalvetti municipalities.

A natural park called Riserva naturale Calafuria is set in the part of the Livorno Hills near the coast.
