= Montenegrin =

Montenegrin may refer to:

- of or related to Montenegro
- Montenegrins, the ethnic group associated with Montenegro
- Montenegrins (demonym), citizens of Montenegro
- Montenegrin language, a variety of Serbo-Croatian spoken by ethnic Montenegrins
- Montenegrin (party), a liberal political party in Montenegro

== See also ==
- Montenegrins (disambiguation)
- Montenegro (disambiguation)
