= Montenegro (disambiguation) =

Montenegro is a country on the Adriatic coast of the Mediterranean Sea.

Montenegro or Monte Negro, meaning "black mountain" in many Romance languages, may also refer to:

== Montenegro (country) ==
- Republic of Montenegro (1992–2006), a federal unit of the Federal Republic of Yugoslavia, and later Serbia and Montenegro
- Socialist Republic of Montenegro, a federal unit of the Socialist Federal Republic of Yugoslavia from 1943 to 1992
- Province of Montenegro, administrative unit within the Kingdom of Serbs, Croats and Slovenes from 1918 to 1922
- Kingdom of Montenegro (1910–1918)
- Principality of Montenegro (1852–1910)
- Prince-Bishopric of Montenegro (1516–1852)

== Other places ==
=== Brazil ===
- Montenegro, Rio Grande do Sul
- Monte Negro, Rondônia

=== Colombia ===
- Montenegro, Quindío

=== Mexico ===
- Monte Negro, Oaxaca

=== Spain ===
- Montenegro, Granada, Andalusia
- Montenegro de Cameros, Castile and León

== Arts ==
- Montenegro (novel), a 1997 novel by Starling Lawrence
- Montenegro (film), a 1981 Swedish film

== People ==
- Montenegro (surname)

== Other uses ==
- Amaro Montenegro, an Italian liqueur
- Montenegro Lines, a Philippine shipping company

== See also ==
- Montenegrin (disambiguation)
- Montenegrins (disambiguation)
- Montenero (disambiguation)
- Black Mountain (disambiguation)
- Čierna Hora (disambiguation)
- Černá Hora (disambiguation)
- Crna Gora (disambiguation)
- Mali i Zi (disambiguation)
