= Montenegrins (disambiguation) =

Montenegrins refers to South Slavic people associated with Montenegro.

Montenegrins may also refer to:

- Montenegrins (demonym), citizens of Montenegro
- Old Montenegrins, inhabitants of the historical "Old Montenegro" region
- Serb Montenegrins, Montenegrin citizens of Serb ethnicity
- Croat Montenegrins, Montenegrin citizens of Croat ethnicity
- Bosniak Montenegrins, Montenegrin citizens of Bosniak ethnicity

== In other geographic regions ==
- Montenegrins of Serbia, a national minority of ethnic Montenegrins in Serbia
  - Montenegrins of Kosovo, form an ethnic minority in Kosovo
- Montenegrins of Bosnia and Herzegovina, a national minority of ethnic Montenegrins in Bosnia and Herzegovina
- Montenegrins of Croatia, a national minority of ethnic Montenegrins in Croatia
- Montenegrins in Albania, form an ethnic minority in Albania
- Montenegrins of North Macedonia, a national minority of ethnic Montenegrins in the Republic of North Macedonia
- Montenegrins of Slovenia, a national minority of ethnic Montenegrins in Slovenia
- Montenegrin Americans, USA citizens who are by origin from Montenegro
- Montenegrin Canadians, Australian citizens who are by origin from Montenegro
- Montenegrin Australians, Australian citizens who are by origin from Montenegro
- Montenegrins in Argentina, members of Montenegrin diaspora in Argentina

== See also ==
- Montenegrin (disambiguation)
- Montenegro (disambiguation)
