= Sport moped =

Type of moped

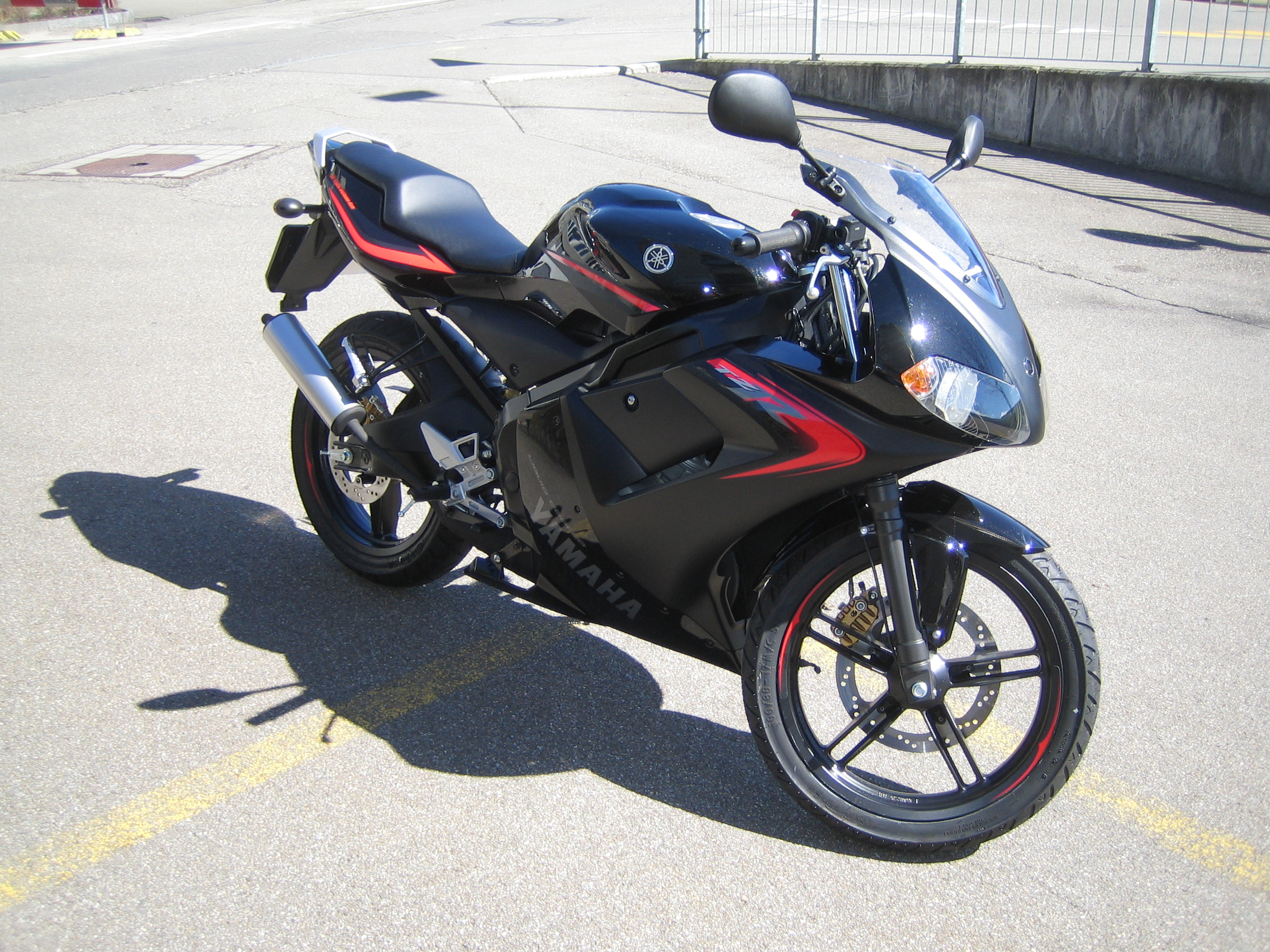
Yamaha TZR 50

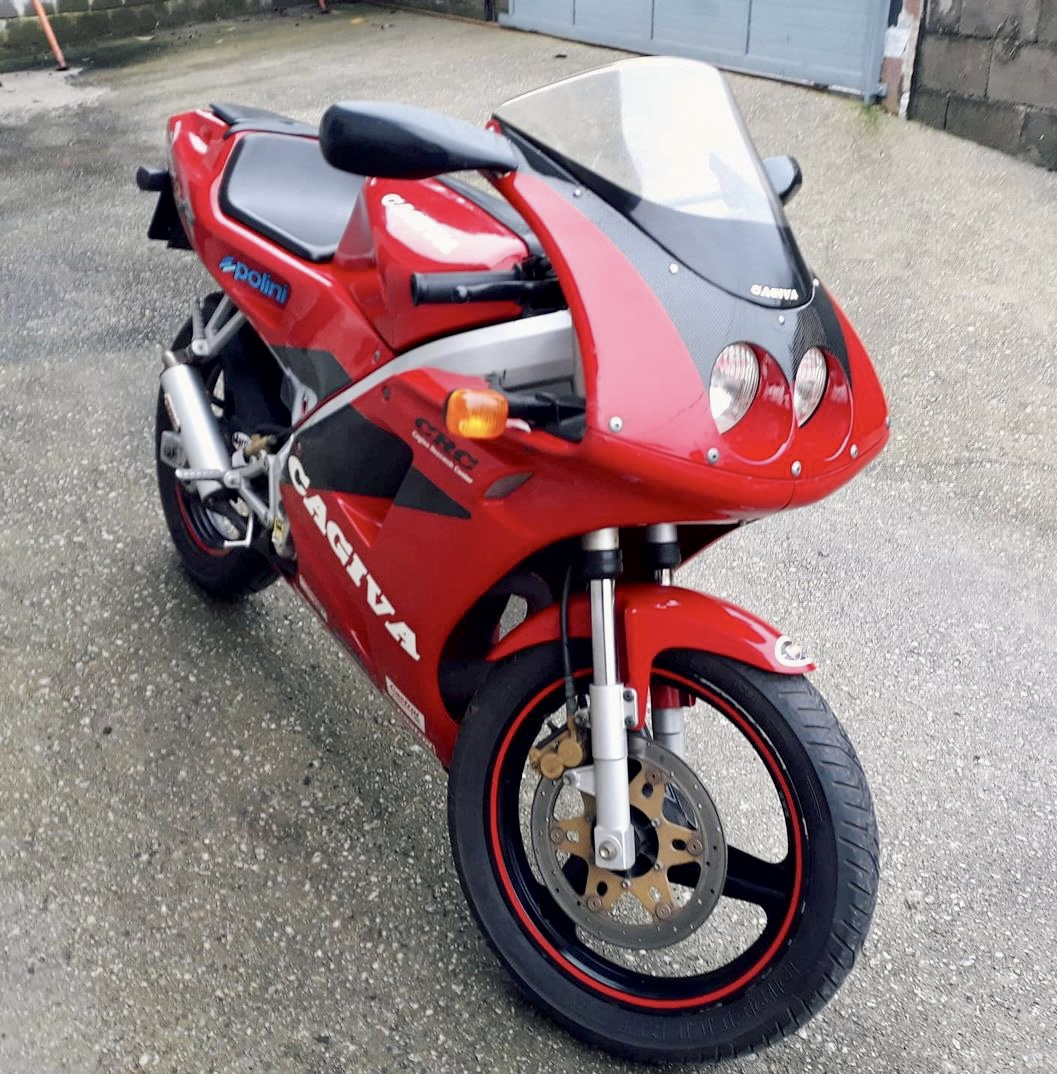
Cagiva Prima

A sport moped is a moped that resembles a sport bike and often performs better than standard mopeds.

== History ==
They were created to circumvent UK legislation, called the "Sixteeners Laws", aimed at taking young motorcycle riders off the road. The new laws, introduced in 1971 by Conservative Party Minister for Transport John Peyton, forbade 16-year-olds from riding motorcycles of 250 cc (15 cu in) capacity, thus limiting them to 50 cc machines until they turned 17.

The law resulted in motorcycle manufacturers developing a new class of high-performance mopeds in the 1970s, termed "sports mopeds" or, colloquially, "sixteener specials," due to their marketing being aimed at 16-year-olds, a move which was widely criticized at the time. If the speed limiter is removed, a four-stroke engine sport-moped can exceed 60 km/h (37 mph), while those with two-stroke engines can reach speeds of over 100 km/h (62 mph). To achieve higher performance, motorcyclists frequently modify the engines, such as installing a big bore kit which raises the displacement. These engine modifications may increase maximum speeds to over 100 and 130 km/h (62 and 81 mph). Sport bikes with 125 cc displacements are sometimes registered as 50 cc mopeds to avoid certain state or federal regulations. Because of this, many manufacturers use identical frames and components in both 125 cc sport bikes and 50 cc sport mopeds, allowing a 125 cc engine to be swapped into a 50 cc sport moped frame. Examples of this are the Aprilia RS50 and RS125, the Derbi GPR50 and GPR125, the Yamaha TZR50 and TZR125, and the Gilera DNA 50 and 125.

Some sport bikes use the Minarelli AM6 engine (2T) (Aprilia RS 50 (1999–2005), Rieju RS2 Matrix 50, Peugeot XR6, Yamaha TZR 50, Malaguti Drakon 50), while other use Piaggio engines (Derbi GPR 50, and Gilera DNA).

Few sport bikes, for example: Gilera DNA and Kingway Fennari were produced with an automatic gearbox.

Bicycle-style pedals were installed when new legislation was passed requiring them. These models were produced from 1972 onwards by Japanese manufacturers Honda, Yamaha, and Suzuki, as well as European companies such as Puch, Fantic, Gilera, Gitane, and Garelli. The most famous of these versions was the Yamaha FS1-E. They included roadsters, enduro and motocrossers, cafe racers and choppers or Scooters, and led to a boom in motorcycling similar to the early 1960s rocker period. The government passed further legislation in 1977 which was more restrictive, limiting mopeds to a weight of 250 kg (550 lb) and a top speed of 30 mph. This later legislation contributed to the decline of the UK motorcycle market. No such restrictions existed in continental Europe, and such vehicles could be ridden by 14-year-olds.

== List of Sport mopeds ==
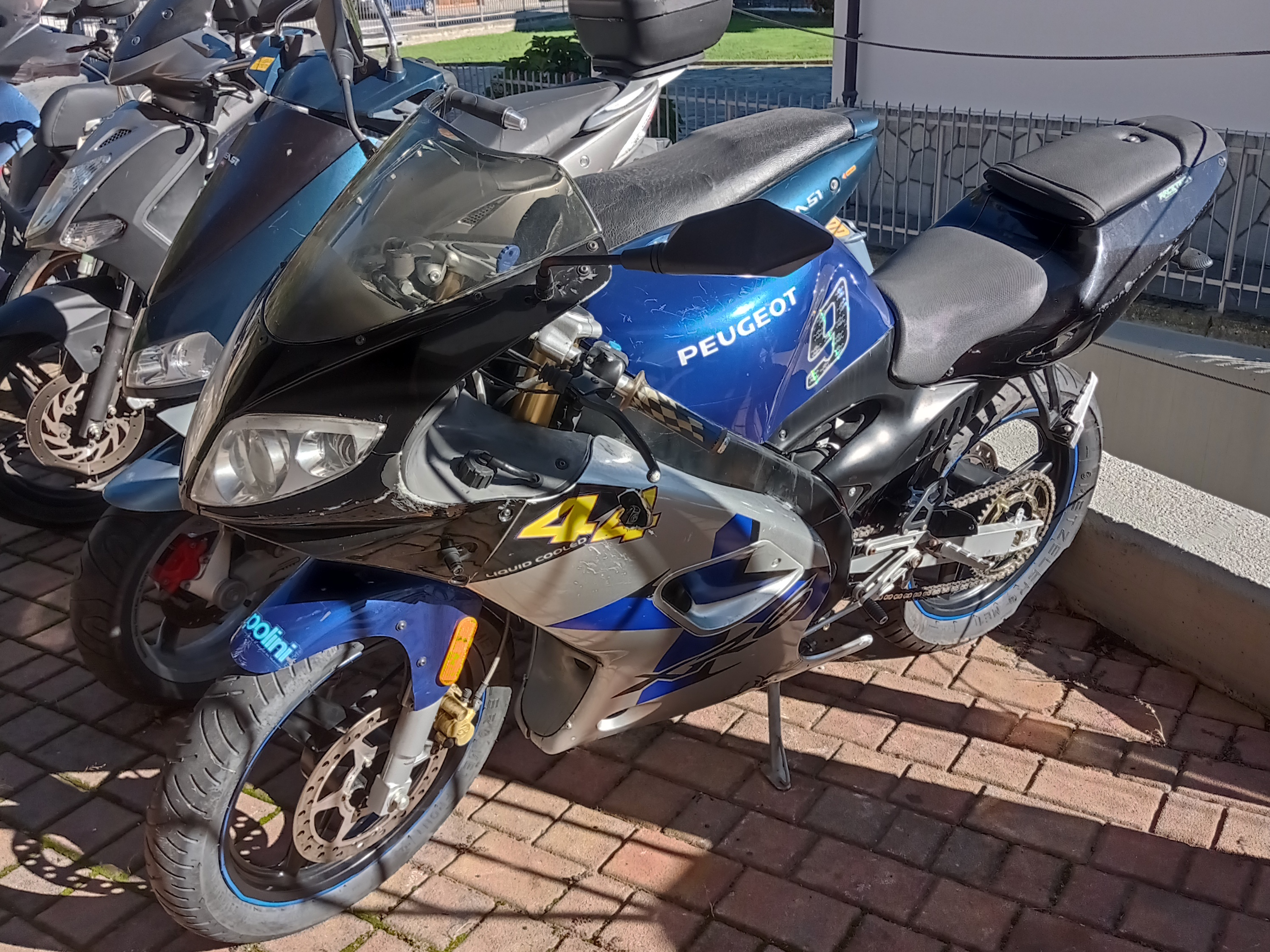
Peugeot XR6

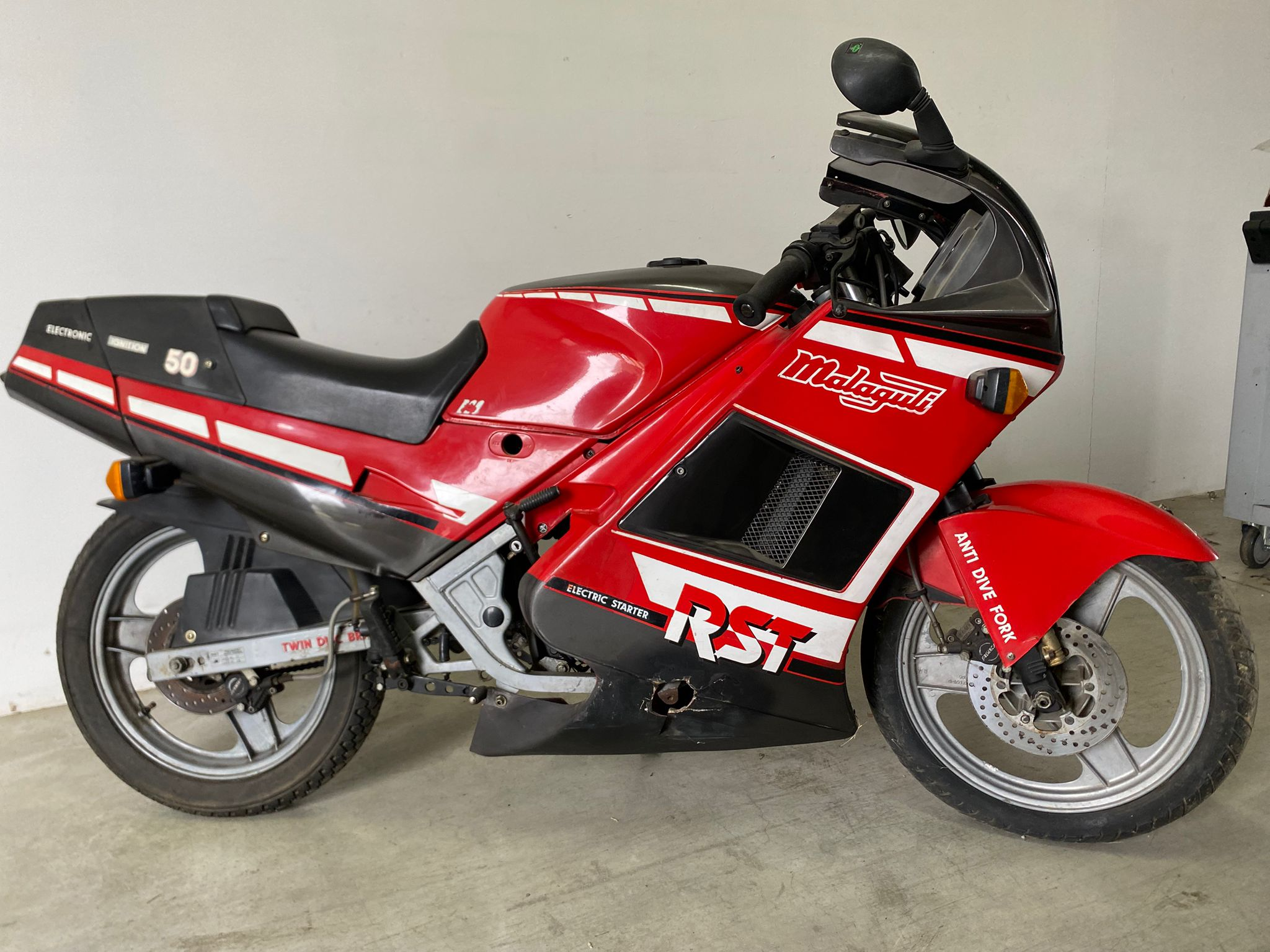
Malaguti RST 50

  - Junak 901 RS and Sport
  - Junak 903 Race
  - Pulse Rage 50
  - Yamasaki YM50
  - Gilera DNA 50
  - Aprilia RS 50
  - Aprilia RS4 50
  - Aprilia Tuono 50
  - Aprilia AF1 50
  - Derbi GPR 50
  - Rieju RS1
  - Rieju RS2 50
  - Rieju RS3 50
  - Peugeot XR6
  - Peugeot XR7
  - Yamaha TZR 50
  - Cagiva Mito 50
  - Cagiva Prima 50
  - Suzuki RG50
  - Malaguti Drakon 50
  - Malaguti RST 50

There are also Minibike sport mopeds; for example:

  - Honda NSR50
  - Yamaha YSR50
  - Suzuki GSX-R50
