= Piaggio X9 =

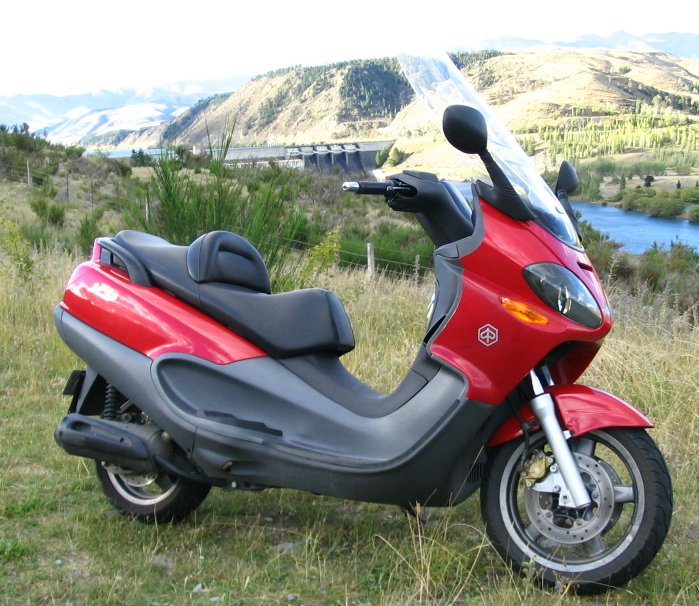
- Manufacturer: Piaggio
- Production: 2000-2009
- Predecessor: Piaggio Hexagon
- Class: Scooter
- Engine: Liquid-cooled single-cylinder engine
- Transmission: CVT
- Suspension: Front: Telescopic fork Rear: Twin-shock with preload adjustment
- Related: Piaggio X8

The Piaggio X9 is a scooter produced by the Italian motorcycle manufacturer Piaggio from the end of 2000 to 2009 in the Pontedera plant.

== Description ==
Presented in March 2000 in a 250 cc version with 20 HP, three years later in 2003 it underwent a first restyling and was renamed X9 Evolution. Production was discontinued in 2009.

The X9 was available in four different engine options. The entry-level version was equipped with a 15 HP 125 engine and weighed 179 kilograms. The other available variants were a 180 cm^{3}, a 250 cm^{3} and a 459 cm^{3}, the latter with a maximum power of 39 bhp.

All models were equipped with an instrument cluster with four round analog elements placed under the fairing, with more than one display acting as trip computer placed instead on the handlebars. ABS was optional.

== Gallery ==
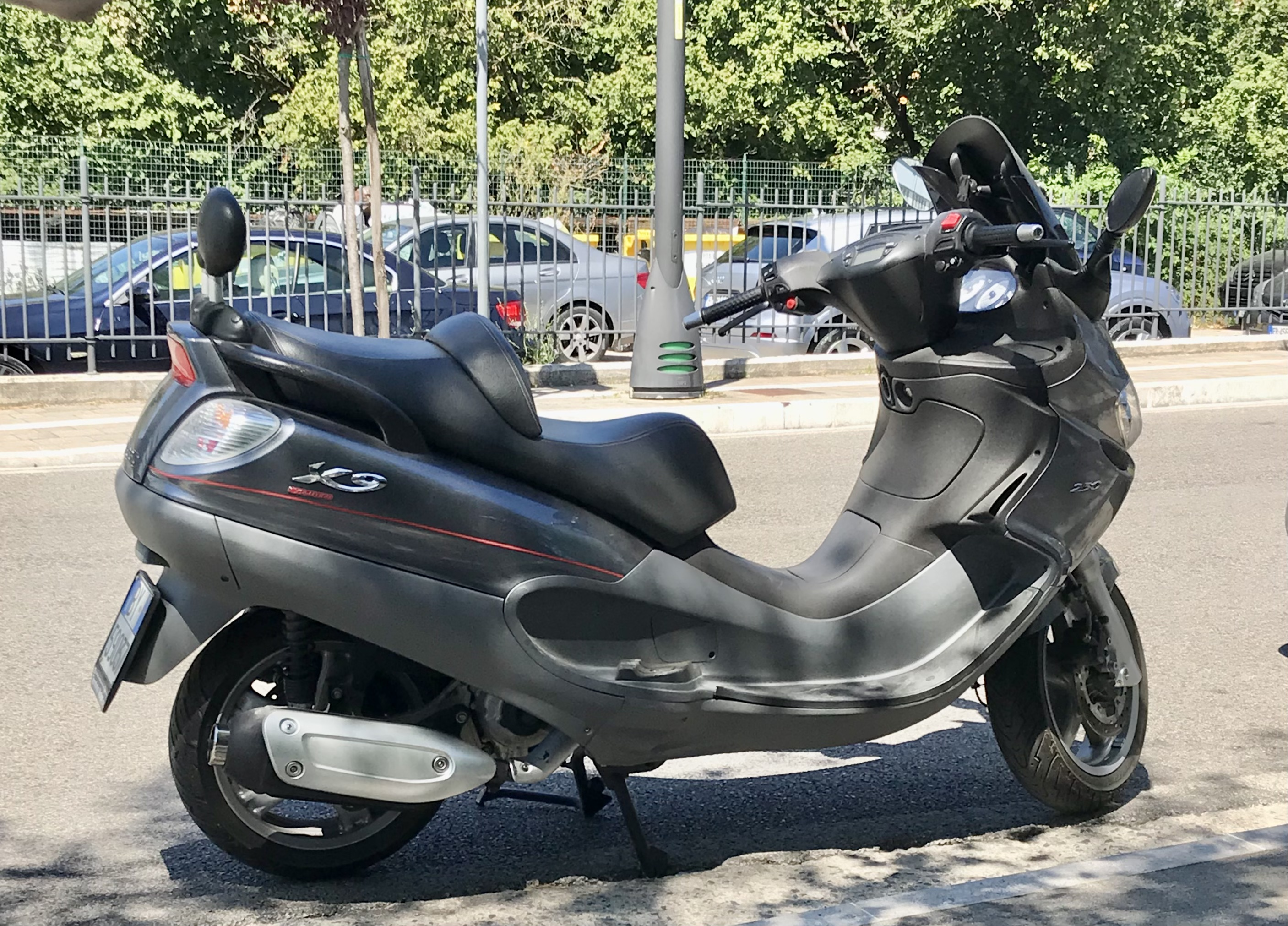
Piaggio X9 Evolution

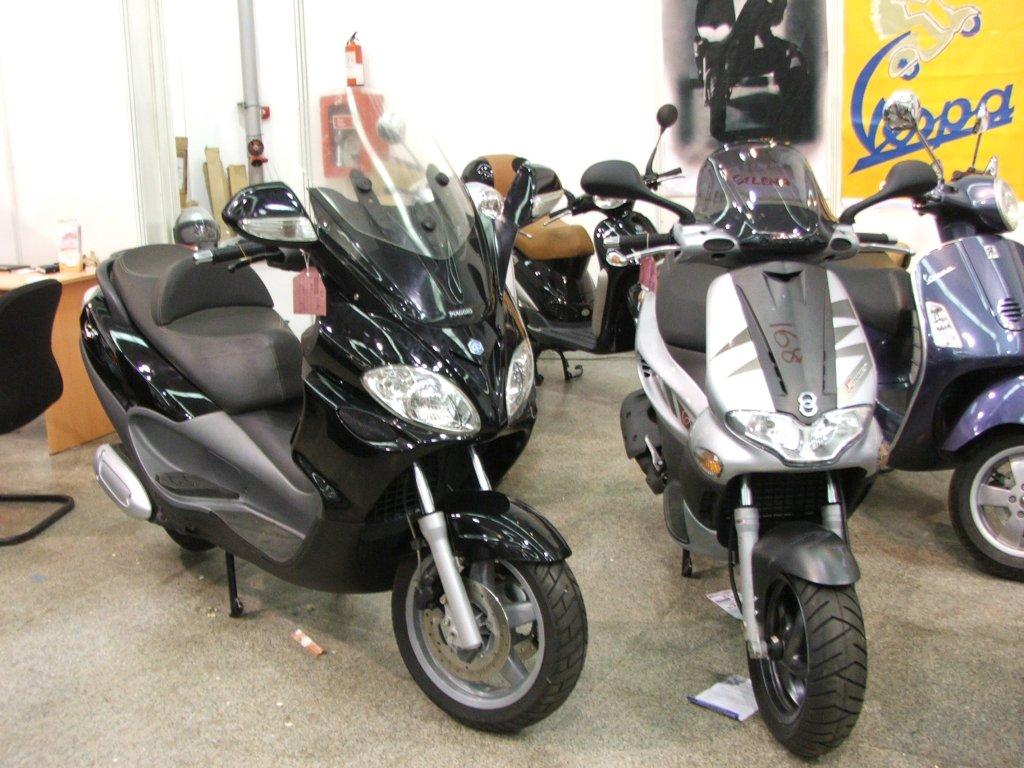
2006 Piaggio X9 and Gilera Runner VXR

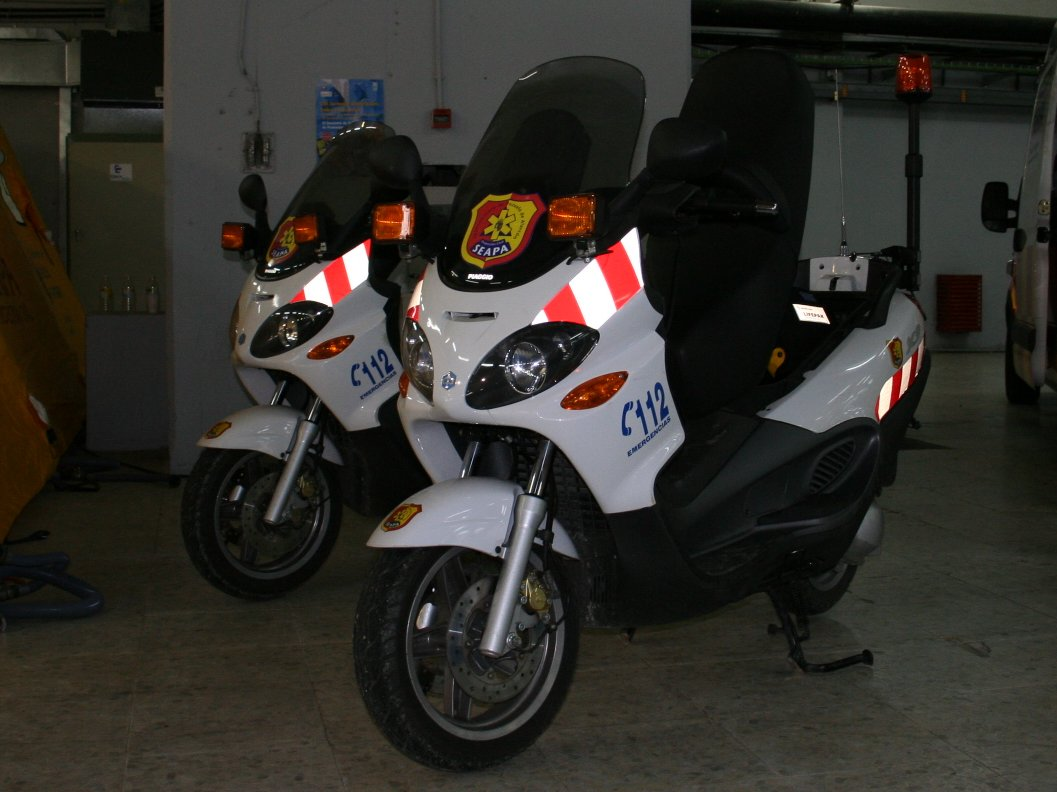
Two Piaggio X9s of Pozuelo de Alarcón Emergency and Rescue Service

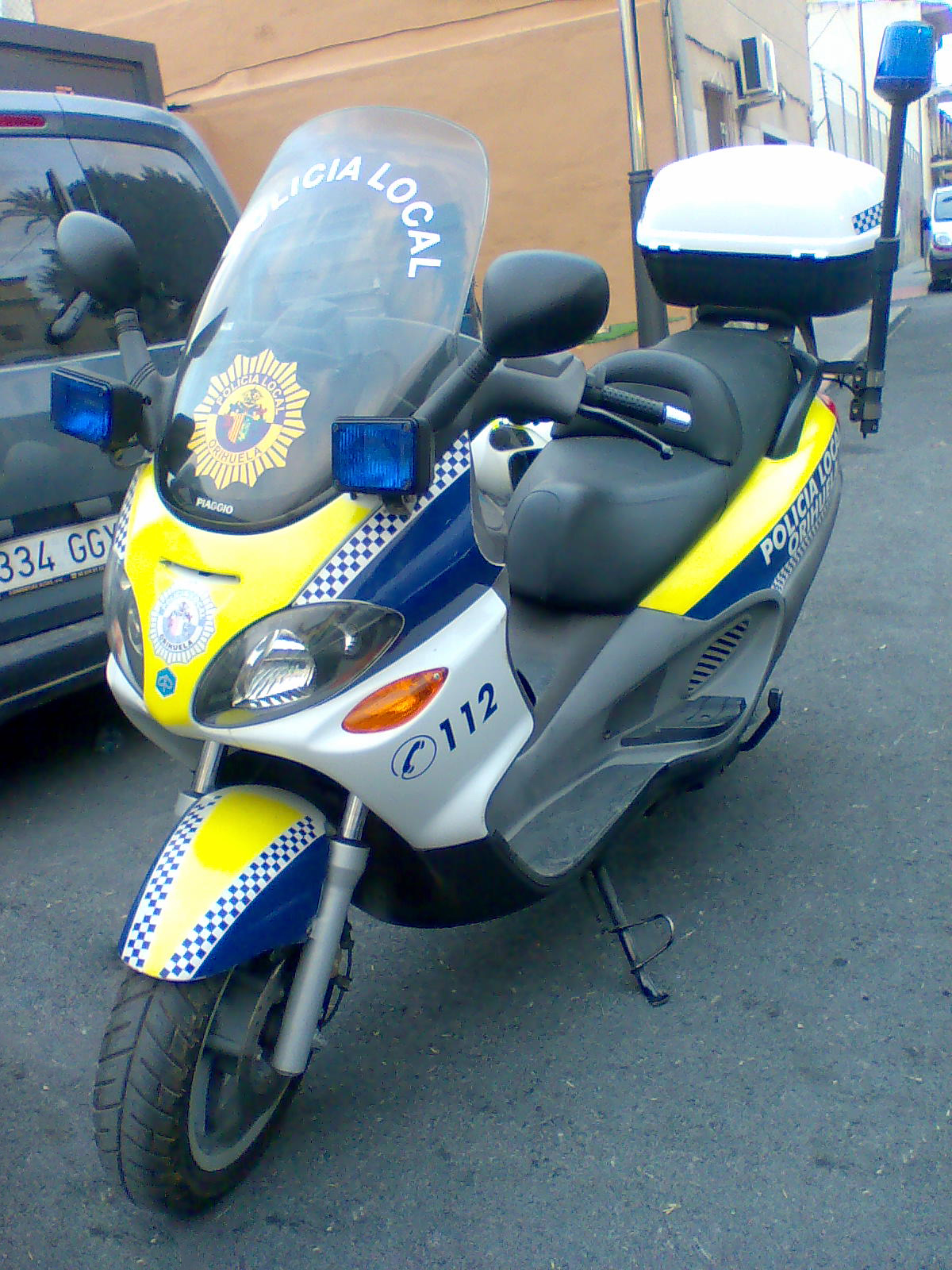
A Piaggio X9 of Orihuela Local Police

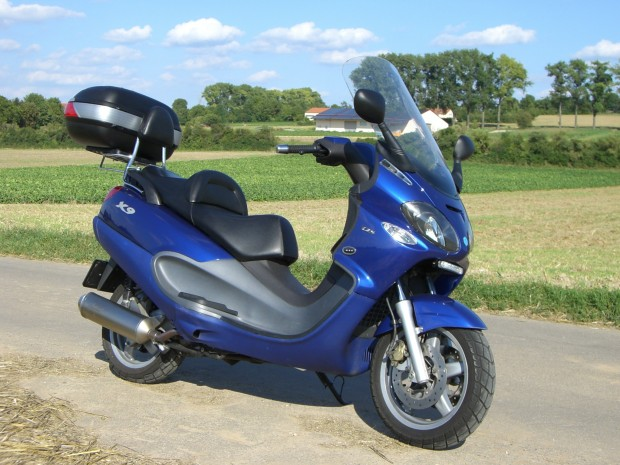

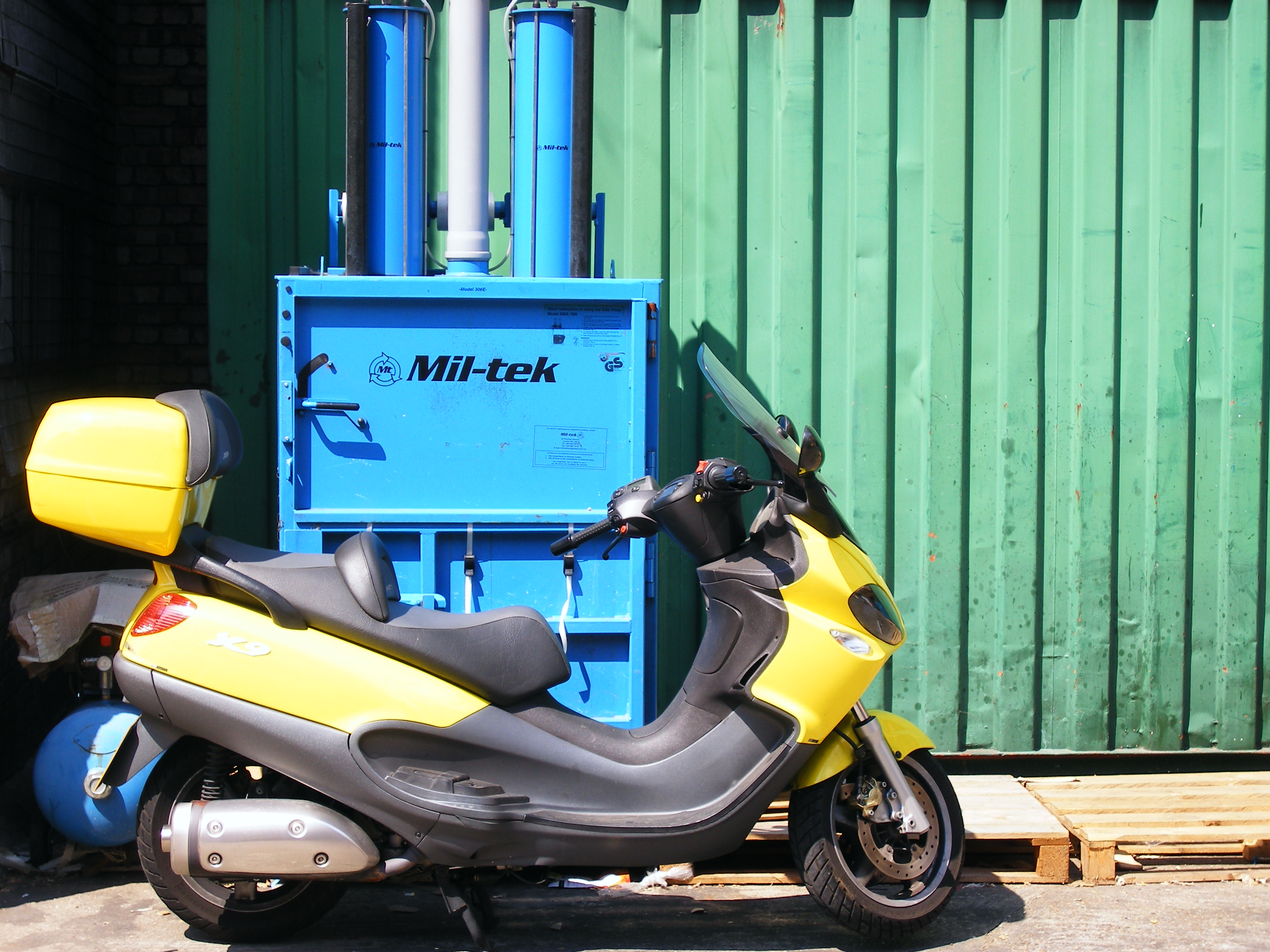
