= Junak =

Junak may refer to:

- SFM Junak, a brand of Polish motorcycle (1956–1965)
- Almot Junak, a brand of Polish motorcycle (2010-)
- Junák, Czech (and Czechoslovak) Scouting organization
- LWD Junak, Polish trainer aircraft (1952–1972)
- PWS-40 Junak, Polish trainer aircraft (1939)
- Zlín 22 Junák, Czechoslovak trainer aircraft (1947)
- Fiat 508 Junak, version of Fiat 508 produced in Poland (1935–1939)
- A number of soccer teams, including:
  - NK Junak Sinj
  - Junak Drohobycz

== See also ==
- Yunak (disambiguation)
