= Aprilia RS50 =

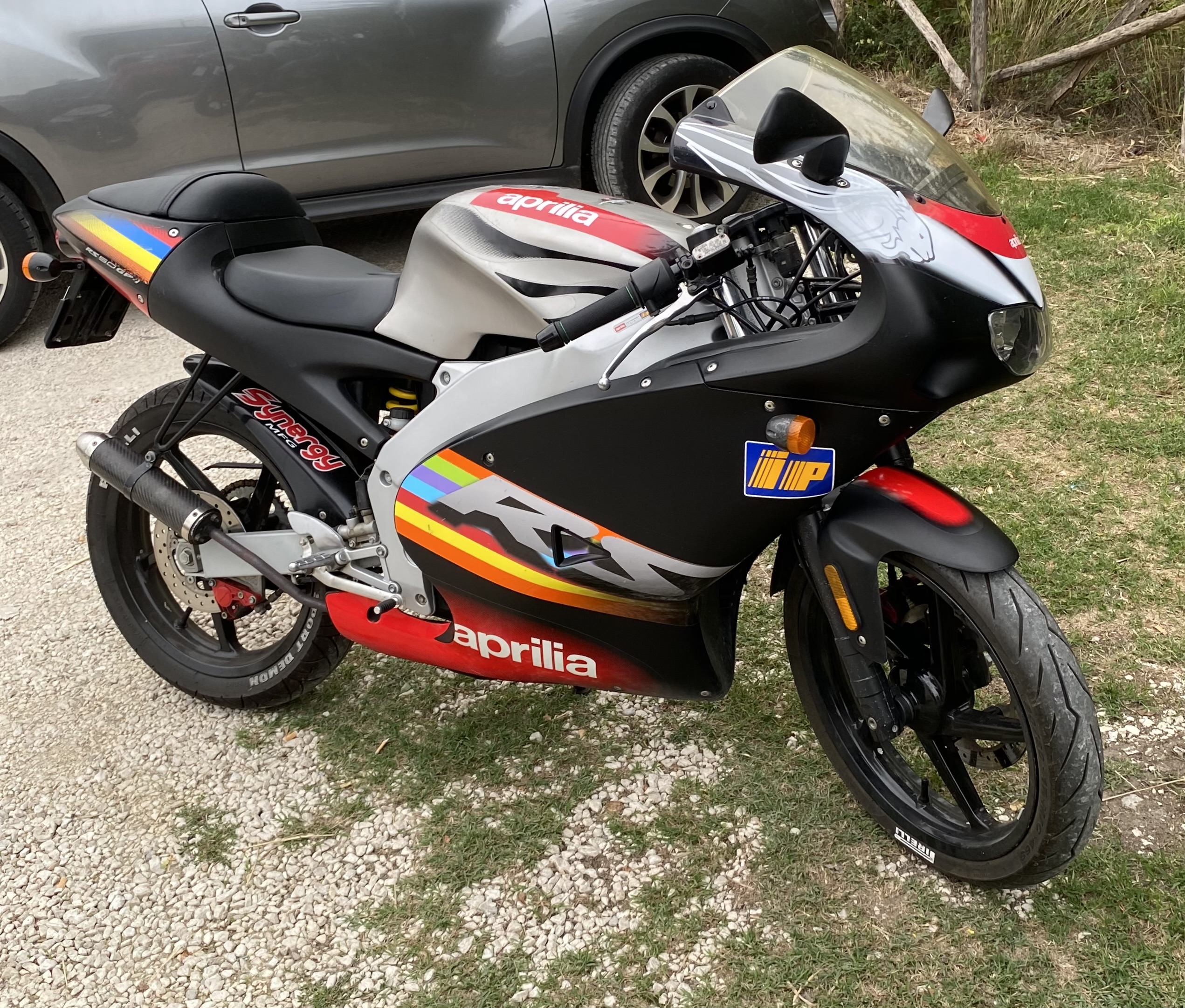
- Manufacturer: Aprilia
- Also called: RS4 50 (2011–2017)
- Production: 1992–2020
- Class: Sport moped
- Engine: 49.9 cc (3.05 cu in) liquid-cooled two-stroke single-cylinder
- Bore / stroke: 39.86 mm × 40.0 mm (1.569 in × 1.575 in)
- Compression ratio: 11.5:1
- Top speed: 95 km/h (59 mph)
- Power: 3.9 kW (5.2 hp)
- Ignition type: CDI
- Transmission: 6-speed, wet clutch, chain drive
- Frame type: Cast aluminium twin-spar
- Suspension: Front: 40 mm (1.6 in) conventional fork, 120 mm (4.7 in) travel Rear: Swingarm with monoshock, 120 mm (4.7 in) travel
- Brakes: Front: 300 mm (12 in) disc Rear: 180 mm (7.1 in) disc
- Tires: Front: 110/80-17; Rear: 130/70-17
- Wheelbase: 1,280 mm (50 in)
- Dimensions: L: 1,920 mm (76 in); W: 675 mm (26.6 in); H: 1,115 mm (43.9 in)
- Seat height: 810 mm (32 in)
- Weight: 89.5 kg (197 lb) (dry)
- Fuel capacity: 13 L (2.9 imp gal; 3.4 US gal)
- Related: Aprilia RS

The Aprilia RS50 is a Sport moped made by Aprilia.

== History ==
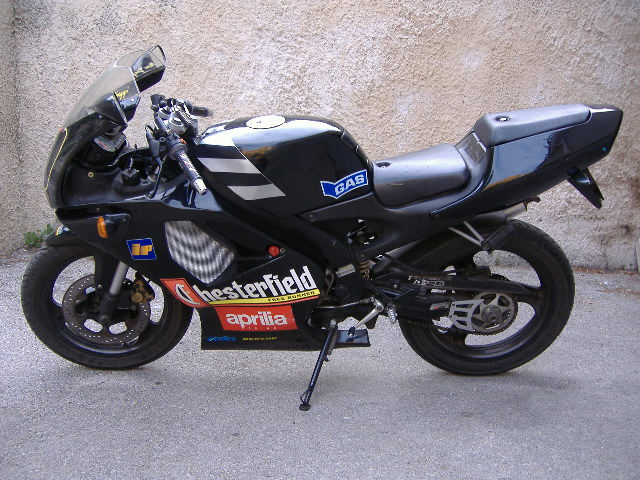
Aprilia RS 50 Chesterfield

The model made until 2005 was powered by a single cylinder two-stroke aluminium cylinder block, liquid cooled 49.7 cc (3.03 cu in) Motori Minarelli AM6 engine. The new model, made since 2006, uses a single cylinder two-stroke aluminium cylinder block, liquid cooled 49.9 cc (3.05 cu in) engine made by Derbi, the D50B0, also known as the derbi NT engine. The bike is popular in countries that have restrictions on motorcycle engine size at specific ages. In restricted form the RS50 is capable of speeds of 45 km/h (30 mph), as per the laws in many European countries for those aged 15. In derestricted form, the 1997 model was tested at a speed of 80 km/h (50 mph). This and other similar machines such as the Derbi GPR 50 and Yamaha TZR50 have also been popular choices as a more adult-sized option for MiniGP racing, which is otherwise more commonly participated in by riders of smaller bikes such as the Honda NSR50.
