= Piaggio Hexagon =

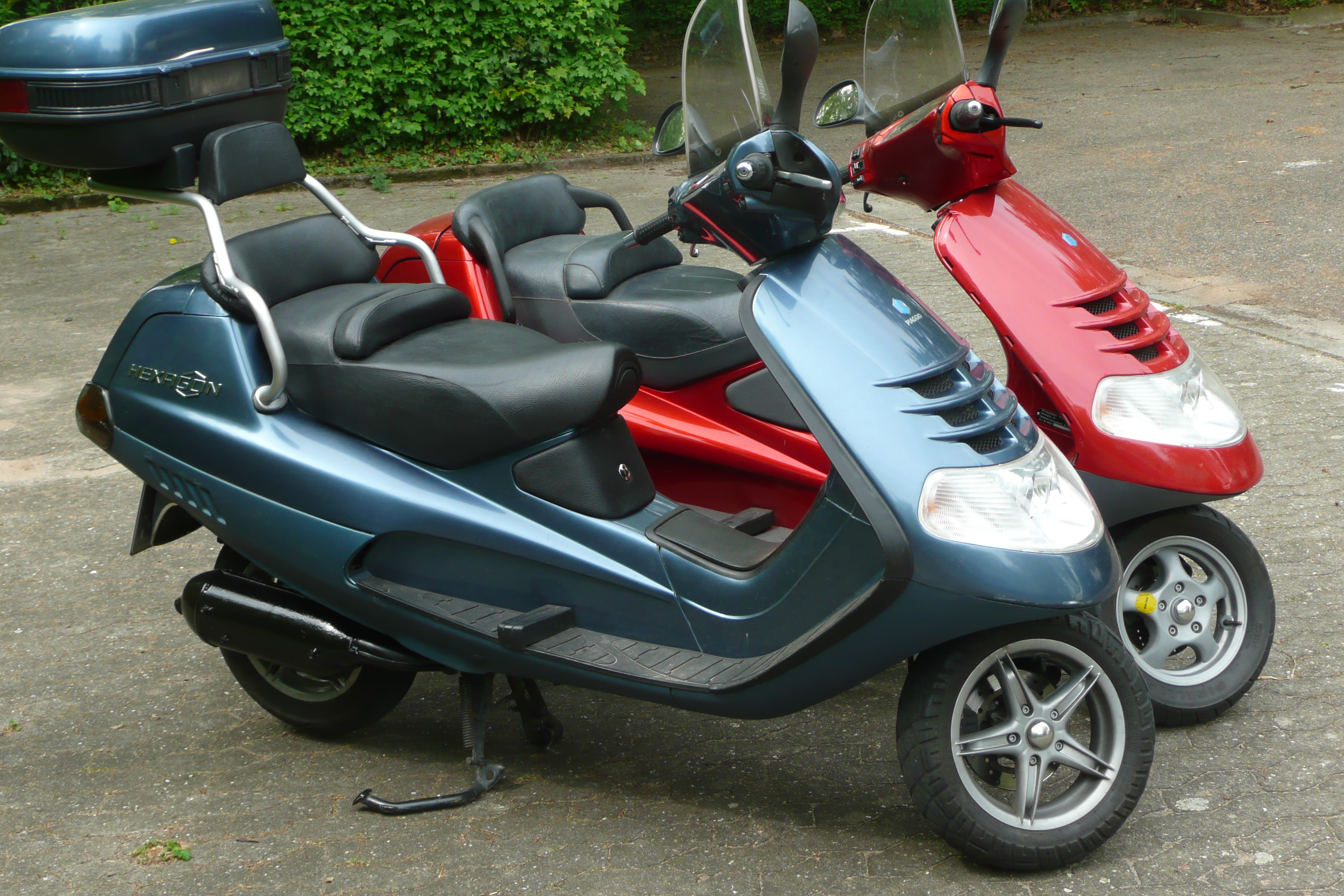
- Manufacturer: Piaggio
- Production: 1994-2003
- Successor: Piaggio X9
- Class: scooter
- Transmission: CVT

The Piaggio Hexagon is a scooter produced by the Italian motorcycle manufacturer Piaggio from the end of 1994 to 2003 in the Pontedera plant.

== Description ==
The first version of the Hexagon was launched on the market in 1994, and was characterized by 10" wheels and a 150 or 125 cm^{3} liquid-cooled two-stroke engine; the chassis also included the presence of a disc brake from 200 mm at the front wheel to a drum brake at the rear This version remained on the market until 1998, and was recognizable by its smaller dimensions compared to the following models, the smaller wheels, the lack of deflectors air on the sides and on the knobs and the presence of orange colored arrows, as well as a single central light.

In 1998 the new Hexagon LX and LXT were presented: compared to the previous model, the dimensions of the wheels were increased, from 10" to 11" to increase their stability, and the general dimensions of the scooter; the new engine was 180 cm^{3}, also two-stroke, it was the same one already used by the Piaggio group on the Gilera Runner, capable of delivering almost 21 horsepower. As aesthetic variations, the headlight was split and equipped with a double lamp, the indicators became transparent and the air deflectors appeared both on the knobs and on the shield; to underline the change, the Hexagon logo was also restyled.

In 1999 two other models make their debut, the Hexagon 250GT and the Hexagon LX4 125, conceived to adapt the offer to the need to use four-stroke engines. Equipped with the same stylistic and chassis solutions as the previous models, the 250GT used a Honda-derived engine that was also mounted in many other scooters from various manufacturers; it was a liquid-cooled 2-valve engine capable of delivering 19 horsepower and ensuring very low fuel consumption compared to the 180 two-stroke. The LX4 version, on the other hand, used the engine that Piaggio had developed and designed for the Piaggio Liberty and the Vespa ET4 125: it was a 125 cm^{3} 4-stroke engine with 2-valve distribution capable of delivering around 10 horsepower.

At the end of 2000 the new four-stroke Piaggio LEADER (Low Emission ADvanced Engine Range) engines were presented, with 4 valves per cylinder, liquid cooling and 15 horsepower for the 125 cm^{3} and over 20 for the 180 cm^{3}; the Hexagon was the first scooter to mount these new engines together with the first Beverly and the X9. The Hexagon LX, LXT and LX4 were therefore abandoned in favor of the new "SuperHexagon" GTX 125 and 180 equipped with the new engines, the 250 cm^{3} was updated with a Honda engine. The differences with the previous versions, as well as in the new engines, consist in the introduction of the disc brake in the rear wheel, in a slight increase in size (especially in length) and in the introduction of a new framework including a digital display with calendar, time and temperature along with a new set of lights.

At the end of 2002, the last restyling was presented, the 250 cm^{3} version with Honda engine went out of production while the 125 and 180 versions remained technically identical to the previous one except for the presence of a new fork with stems in place of the old single-sided and for further increase in wheel size passed 12".

In 2003, internal competition with the new Beverly and the new X9, combined with an aesthetic considered dated, led Piaggio to withdraw the Hexagon from the market after almost 10 years of production, ending Piaggio's dominance in the wheel scooter market low.

== Technical info ==
	GTX 125	GTX 180	GTX 250	LX 125
Displacement	124 cc	182 cc	244 cc	124 cc
Bore	57 mm	69 mm	72 mm	54 mm
Race	48,6 mm	48,6 mm	60 mm	52 mm
max power (HP)	15	20	19	15
No. of valves	4	4	2	0
Cooling ]	liquid			
Front tyre	120/70-11"			100/70/11
Rear tyre	130/70-11"			
Length	2012 mm			
Length	740 mm			
Wheelbase	1450 mm	1450 mm	1400 mm	
saddle height	785 mm			
Reservoir	11.4 l			
max speed	104 km/h	118 km/h	118 km/h	118 km/h
Weight	139 kg	139 kg	142 kg	142 kg
