= YSR =

YSR can refer to:

- Y. S. Rajasekhara Reddy (1949–2009), former chief minister of Andhra Pradesh, India
  - YSR Congress Party, a political party in Andhra Pradesh, India, led by Y. S. Jagan Mohan Reddy, son of Rajasekhara
  - Kadapa district (also referred to as YSR Kadapa District after the chief minister), a district in Andhra Pradesh, India
  - YSR Indoor Stadium, an indoor sporting arena located in Yanam, Puducherry, India; named after the chief minister
  - Yatra (2019 film), also YSR: Yatra, an Indian film about the chief minister
- Yamaha YSR50, a miniature motorcycle made by Yamaha
- Yuvan Shankar Raja (born 1979), music director
- Ystrad Rhondda railway station (National Rail code) in South Wales
- Nanisivik Airport (IATA code) in the Canadian territory of Nunavut
- AP State Archaeology Museum
- the callsign used by Canal 2 in El Salvador, which was formerly branded as that
- A US Navy hull classification symbol: Sludge removal barge (YSR)
