= Pulse Rage 50 – LK50GY-2 =

Pulse Rage 50 - LK50GY-2
- Manufacturer: Pulse Motorcycles - Llexeter ltd
- Also called: LK50GY (Europe and China)
- Production: since 2006
- Successor: Pulse Rage 125 - LK125GY-2
- Class: sport moped
- Engine: Single cylinder, 4-stroke, air-cooled
- Torque: 2.25 bhp @ 8,200 rpm
- Transmission: Automatic - Twist & Go
- Suspension: Telescopic forks (front), Twin shock absorber (rear)
- Brakes: Hydraulic disc (front), Drum (rear)
- Tires: 130/60-13 (front), 130/70-12 (rear)
- Wheelbase: 1340 mm
- Dimensions: L: 1930 mm W: 690 mm H: 1025 mm
- Fuel capacity: 7 litres / 1.5 gallons

The LK50GY (Pulse Rage 50 – LK50GY-2 in Europe) is a motorcycle manufactured by Pulse Motorcycles Ltd and is currently their only 50 cc sport moped. The manufacturer's suggested retail price (SRP) for the LK50GY in the UK market is £1395. The LK50GY is particularly popular amongst 16-year-old learner drivers. The LK50GY is also very fuel economical as the manufacturer's advised fuel consumption is 141.24 MPG. The bike is 7/8 of the size of an average bike, making it easier to maneuver and support for beginners and riders of a smaller size.

== Specifications ==
Engine

- Single cylinder four-stroke, air cooled.
  - Engine Brand: LK139QMB
  - Displacement: 50cc
  - Advised Fuel Consumption: 141.24 MPG
  - Ignition: Electronic
  - Starting Method: Electric, Key start
  - Power: 2.25 bhp
  - Top Speed: 50 mph depending on rider and year of bike's manufacture (35 mph when restricted for learner usage)

Dry Weight

- 108 kg

Gear box

- Automatic

Final drive

- Belt Driven

Frame

Cast aluminium with plastic fairing

Suspension

- Front suspension: Telescopic Forks
- Rear suspension: Twin Shock Absorber

Brakes

- Front: Hydraulic Disc
- Rear: Drum

Wheels

- Five spoke aluminium alloy

Tires

- Tubeless radial. Front 130/60-13; rear 130/70-12.

Fuel tank capacity

- 7 litres / 1.5gal

Battery Voltage

- 12V

Battery Capacity

- 7a

EEC Approval Number

- e4*2002/24*1681*01

== Colors ==
- Metallic Black
- Metallic Silver
- Metallic Red

== See also ==
Gilera DNA
