= Piaggio Xevo =

Piaggio XEvo
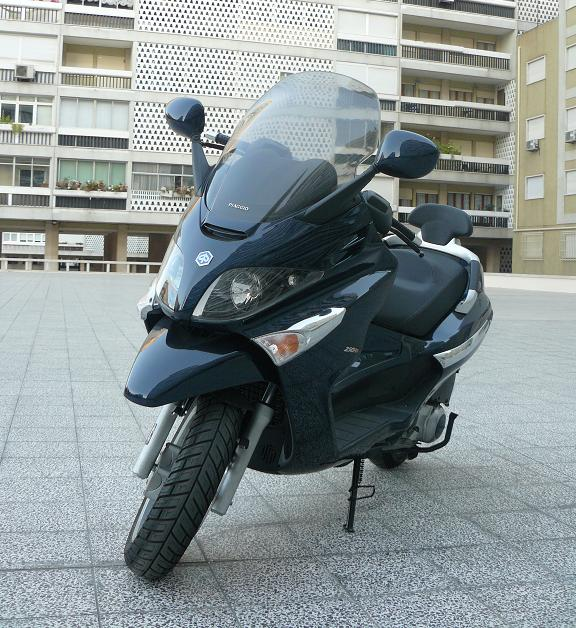
- Manufacturer: Piaggio
- Production: 2008-2010
- Class: scooter
- Engine: Liquid-cooled single-cylinder engine 400ie: 399 cc (24.3 cu in); 250: 244 cc (14.9 cu in) 125: 124 cc (7.6 cu in)
- Power: 400ie: 24 kW (32 hp) @ 7,250 rpm 250: 16.5 kW (22.1 hp) @ 8,250 rpm 125: 11 kW (15 hp) @ 9,750 rpm
- Torque: 400ie: 38 N⋅m (28 ft⋅lb) @ 5,250 rpm 250: 21 N⋅m (15 ft⋅lb) @ 6,750 rpm 125: 12 N⋅m (8.9 ft⋅lb) @ 8,000 rpm
- Transmission: CVT
- Suspension: Front: Telescopic fork Rear: Twin-shock with preload adjustment
- Brakes: Front: (400ie and 250) 240 mm dual discs (125) 260 mm single disc Rear: 240 mm disc
- Tires: Front: 120/70-14; Rear: (400ie and 250) 140/70-14 (125) 130/70-12 all tubeless
- Dimensions: L: 400ie and250: 2,184 mm (86.0 in) 125: 2,070 mm (81 in); W: 760 mm (30 in); H: 400ie and250: 1,540 mm (61 in) 125: 1,490 mm (59 in)
- Weight: 400ie and 250: 171 kg (377 lb); 125: 161 kg (355 lb) (wet)
- Fuel capacity: 12 L (3.2 US gal)
- Related: Piaggio X8

The Piaggio XEvo is a series of scooters produced by Italian manufacturer Piaggio. The line shares various components and design, and sporting different engines sizes of 125 cc, 250 cc and 400 cc, and is a direct development of the Piaggio X8.

== Specifications ==
All models sport a single-cylinder, four-stroke, multi-valve engine that meets Euro 3 European emission standards, and have a continuously variable transmission (CVT)

The 125 cc model has a carburetor 124 cc Lead engine, 11 kW (15 hp), the 250 cc has a liquid-cooled, fuel-injected 244 cc Quasar engine that delivers 16.5 kW (22.1 hp), and the 400 cc model's Master liquid-cooled, electronic fuel injection 399 cc engine power output rates 24 kW (32 hp).

A distinctive XEvo element is its boot, a large underseat storage space with 56 litres (2.0 cubic feet) capacity, enough for two full-face helmets or objects up to 80 cm (31 inches) long, and the remote style key that separately opens the front and rear storage compartments. The storage compartment also has a foldaway seat cover and a courtesy light. The front shield area, besides the odometer, trip computer and tachometer, provides further space to place small items and is also equipped with a 12 volt plug to use a GPS, or recharge a mobile phone.

All XEvo models have a steel tube frame and the front suspension is provided via a 35 mm fork; rear suspension is done via two double-acting hydraulic shock absorbers, with a four-position spring preload adjustment.
Braking on all models is performed by a 240 mm rear disc brake. In the front, both the 125 cc and 250 cc models feature a single 260 mm front disc, the 400 cc version has two 240 mm front discs. All models have a 14-inch front wheel. The rear wheel on the 125 and 250 is 12 inches, and 14 inches on the 400 cc version.
The direction indicators double as hazard warning indicators. The rear seat grab handles feature a high grip central insert for extra passenger safety, extending rearwards sporting a backrest.
