= Yunak (disambiguation) =

Yunak is a town in Turkey.

Yunak may also refer to:

- Yunak Gymnastic Society, a Bulgarian sports society
- Yunak Stadium, a multi-use stadium in Sofia, Bulgaria
- Yunak, Bulgaria, a village in Varna Province, Bulgaria
- Yunak Peak, Antarctica

== See also ==
- Junak (disambiguation)
