= Honda NSR50 =

Minibike

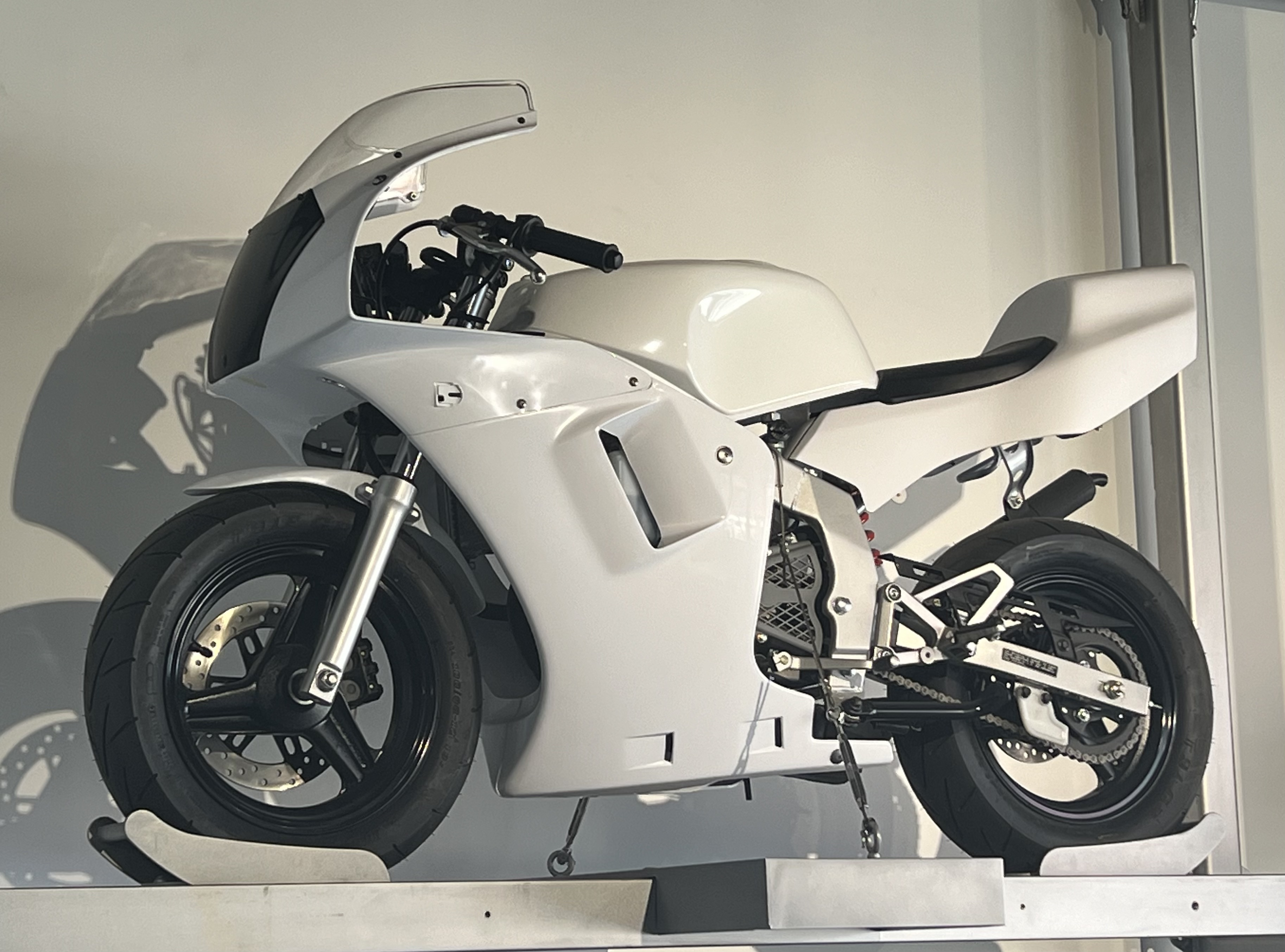
- Manufacturer: Honda motor company
- Production: 1987–2004
- Class: Minibike

The A-AC10 Honda NSR50 is a motorcycle produced by Honda Motor Company. It was offered in a street legal format in several countries including Japan, France, Spain and more. It was also offered as an off-road use race bike variant in both Japan and the USA. The USA received it as a one-year only 2004 model designated as an NSR50R. In Japan it was offered in both 2004 and 2009 as the NSR Mini.

== Overview ==
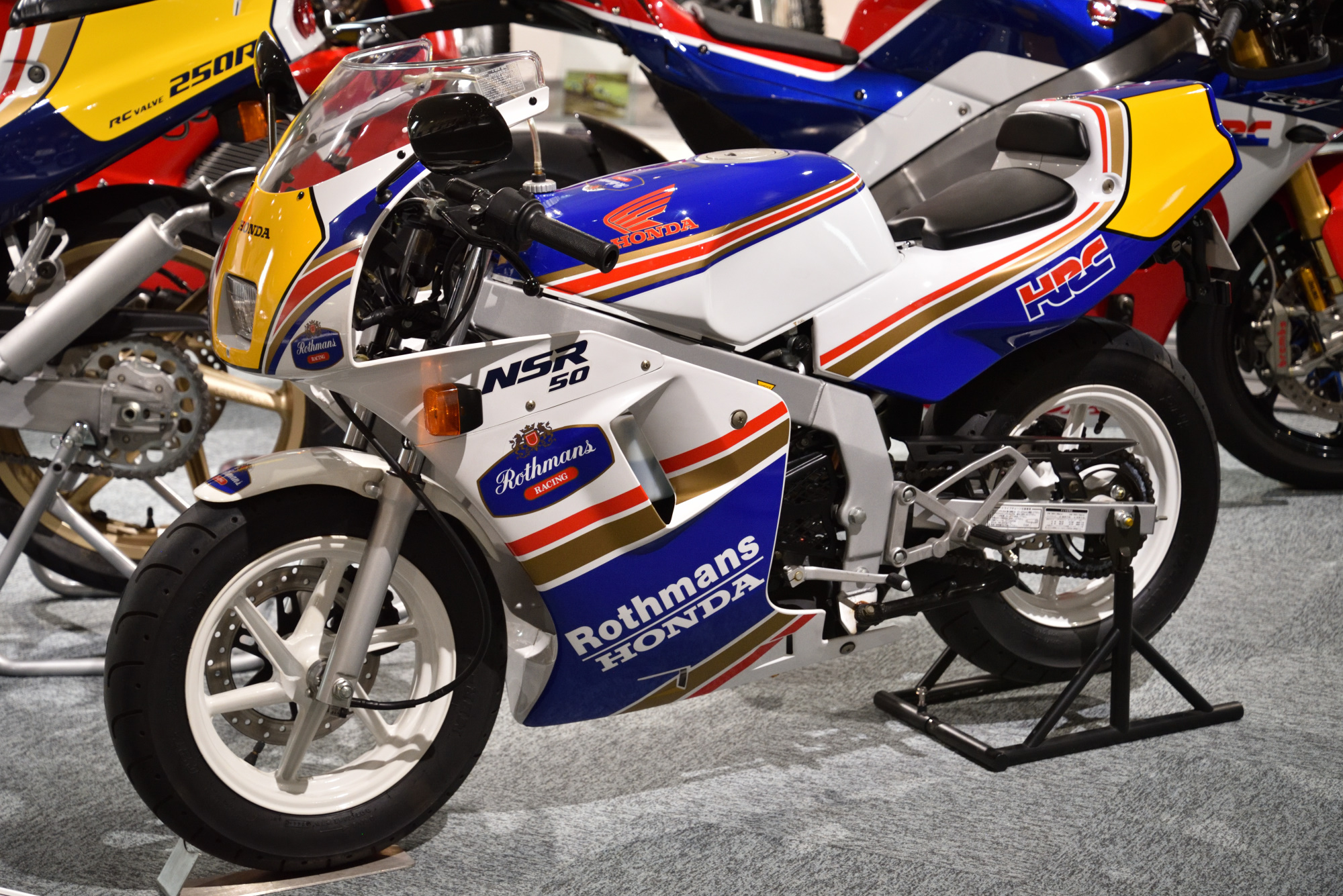
1994 Honda NSR50

The NSR50 was released on May 29, 1987. Important factors in its development were Suzuki Motor Co, Ltd's release of their GAG, a 50cc full fairing mini racer replica, as well as Yamaha Motor releasing their own version, the YSR50. Both quickly enjoyed popularity in mini-bike and circuit racing. Honda, considering both models advantages and disadvantages released their own version with a water-cooled engine, as well as dual hydraulic disc brakes, which neither competing model featured.

It is one of the most commonly raced motorcycles in minibike club road racing in the US, and enjoys similar popularity world-wide. It typically falls into class with other two-stroke 50cc road bikes such as the Yamaha YSR50, but is also commonly classed with up to 110cc four-stroke bikes.

The NSR50's engine (designated as AC08E), is a horizontal, single cylinder, water-cooled, two-stroke engine that uses piston port injection. It has an inner diameter x stroke = 39.0x41.4 (mm), with a total internal dimension of 49CC. The maximum output is 7.2ps/10,000 rpm, and the maximum torque output 0.65kgf m/7,500rpm It has a total fuel capacity of 7.5L, with a 1.1L Oil tank, utilizing a vacuum powered oil injection pump on road-faring models The engine is kick-start, or bump-start only depending on the model. It uses a wet-clutch, cross-mesh close ratio Six-Speed transmission.

It utilizes a steel, twin tube diamond shaped frame, with twin telescopic forks up front with an inner diameter of 30mm, as well as a steel swing arm in the rear using a mono-shock design. The early models of bikes have a caster angle 25°00, but it was changed to 24°50 in 1995. The NSR50R produced for the US for 2004 by HRC has both 30mm taller forks and head stalk. The brakes are hydraulic single discs in both the front and rear, the front using a 2-pot caliper, with a single-pot in the rear. It wears a tire size of 100/90-12 48J (front) and 120/80-12 54J (back) on square 10x4jj aluminum wheels.

== See also ==
- Sport moped
