= Almot Junak =

Junak is a Polish brand of motorcycles, imported from China by Almot since 2010. It continues the branding of SFM Junak motorcycles produced between 1956 and 1965.

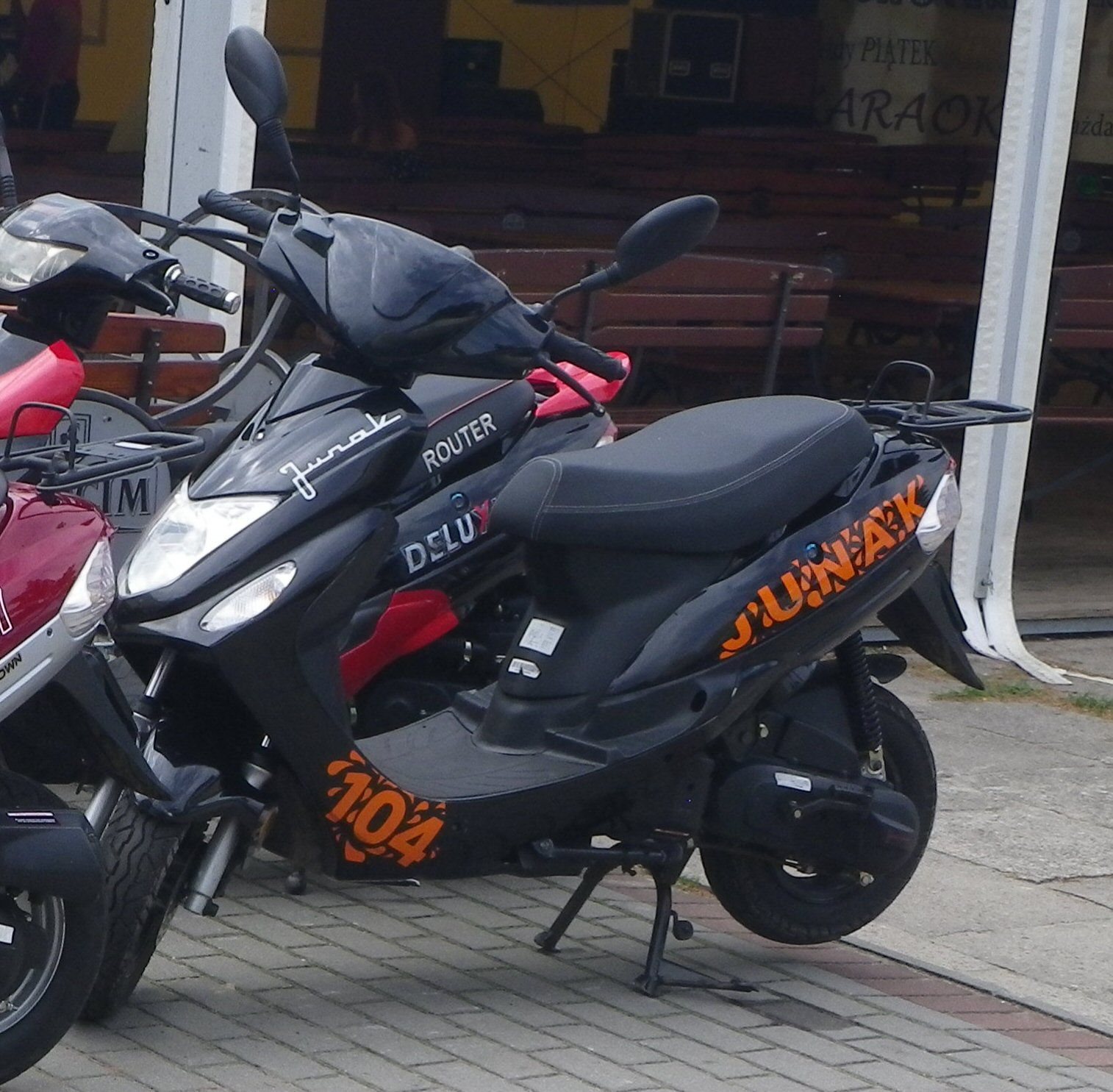
Junak 104

Established in 1983, Almot started selling the M16 model, its first to use the legacy Junak brand, in 2010. In subsequent years it introduced a number of other motorcycles, mopeds and scooters using the same branding.

== Motorcycles ==
=== Choppers and Cruisers ===
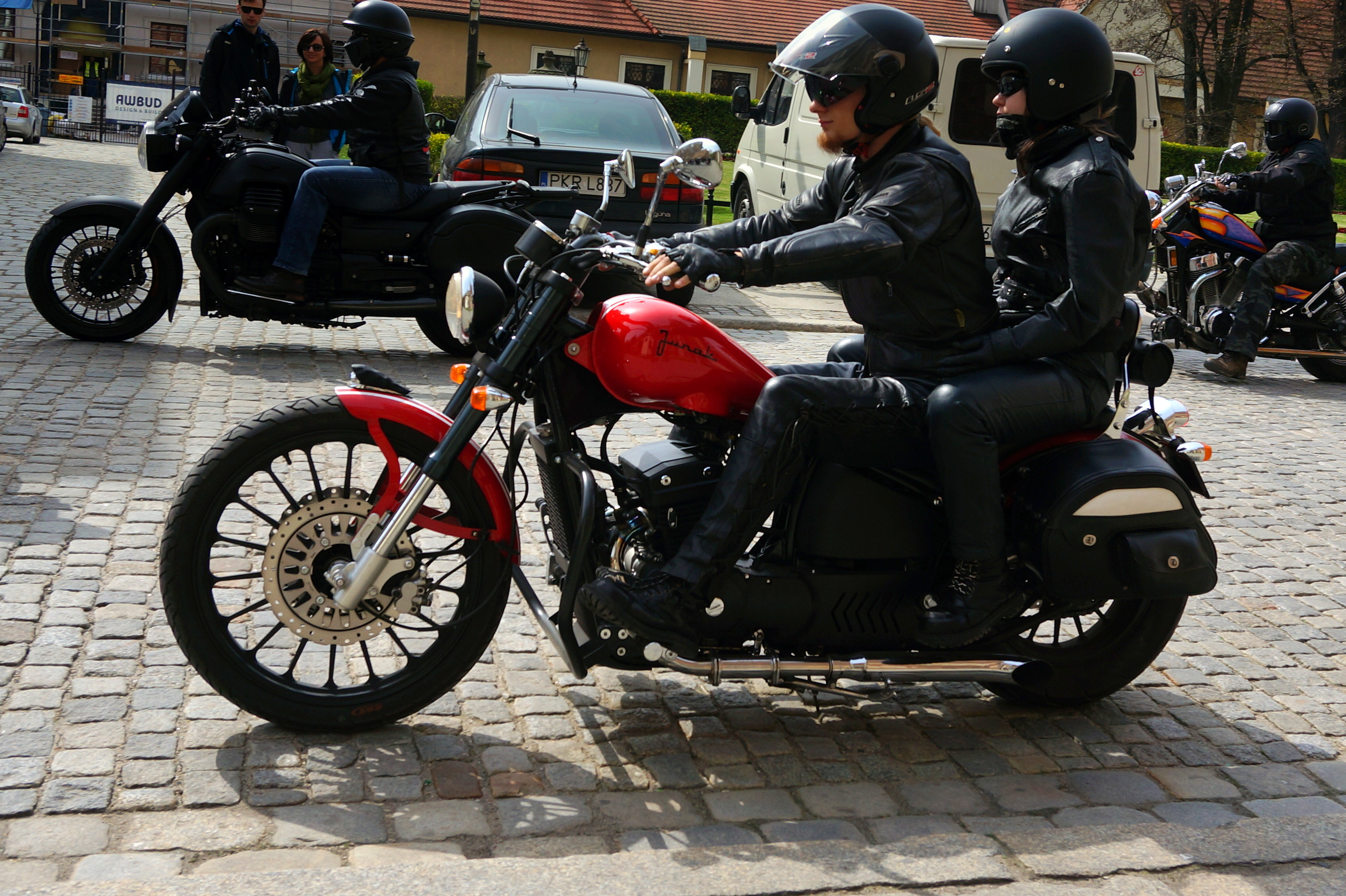
Junak M16

- Junak M11
- Junak M12
- Junak M16

=== Sport bikes ===
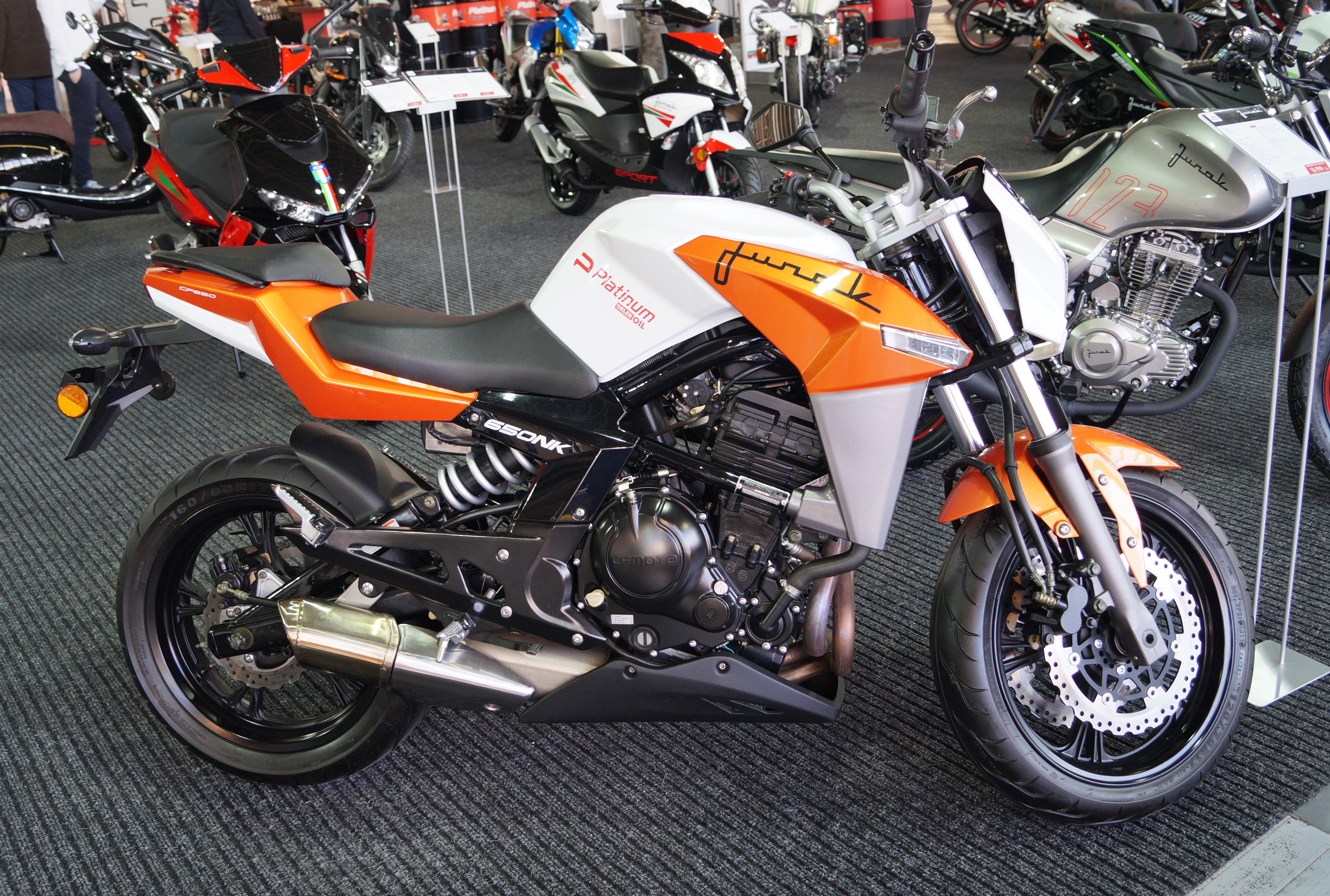
Junak NK650

- Junak 122 RS
- Junak 122 Sport
- Junak 124
- Junak S200
- Junak NK650
- Junak RS125

=== Classical ===
- Junak 121
- Junak 122
- Junak 123
- Junak M20
- Junak M25

== Mopeds ==
=== Sport mopeds ===
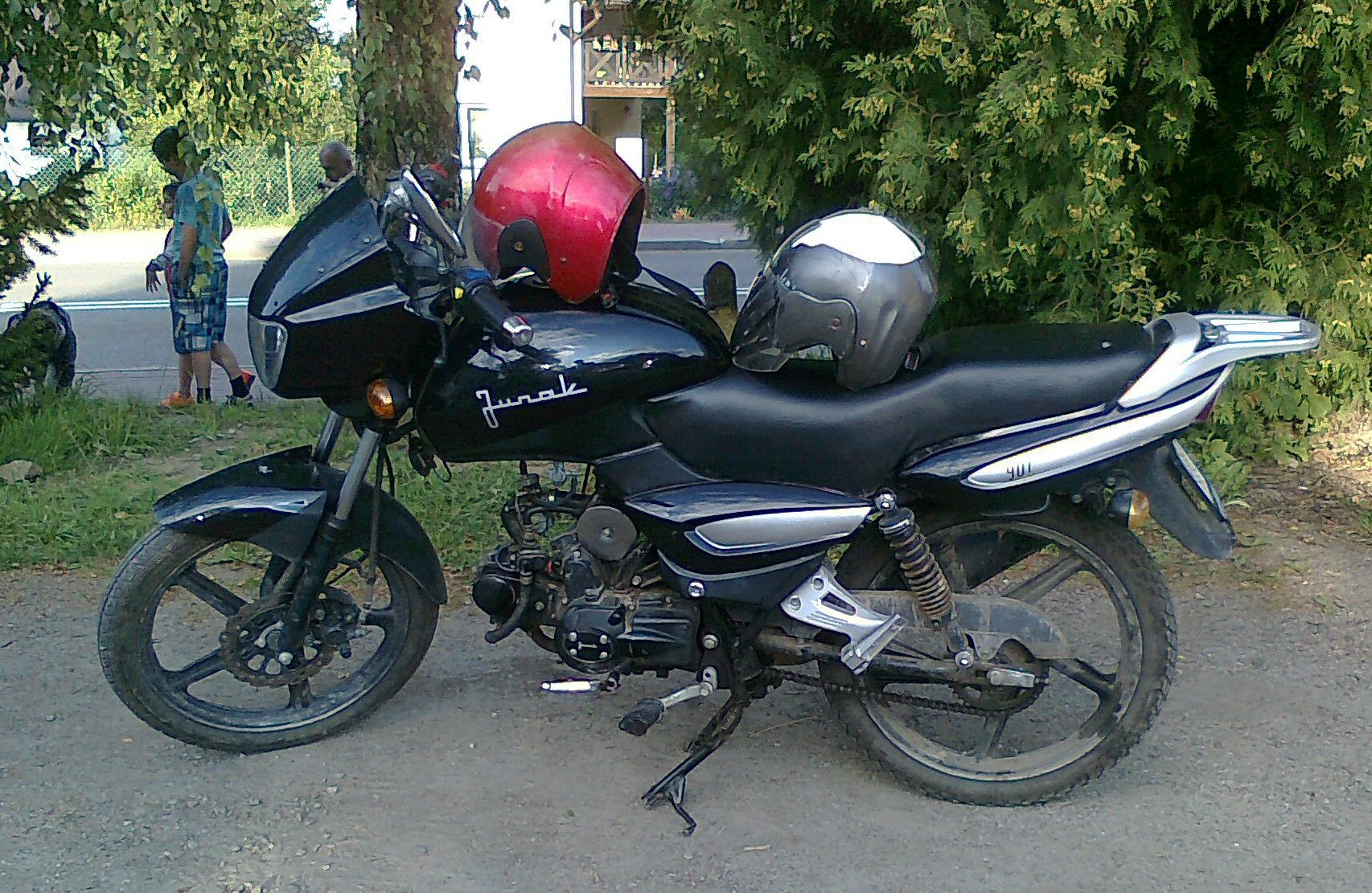
Junak 901 Sport

- Junak 901 Sport
- Junak 903 Race
- Junak 904
- Junak 905

=== Classical ===
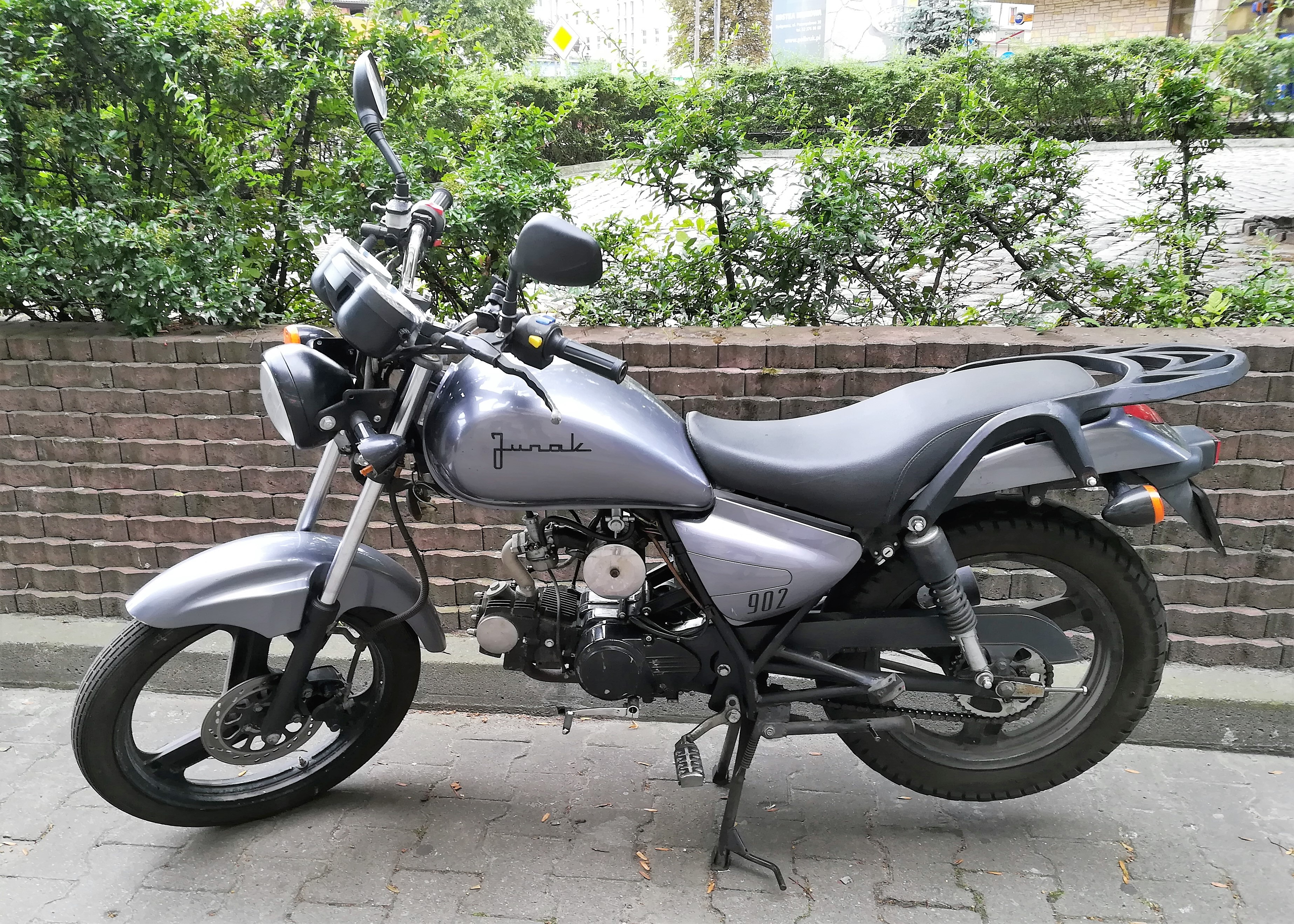
Junak 902

- Junak 902
