= Gilera DNA =

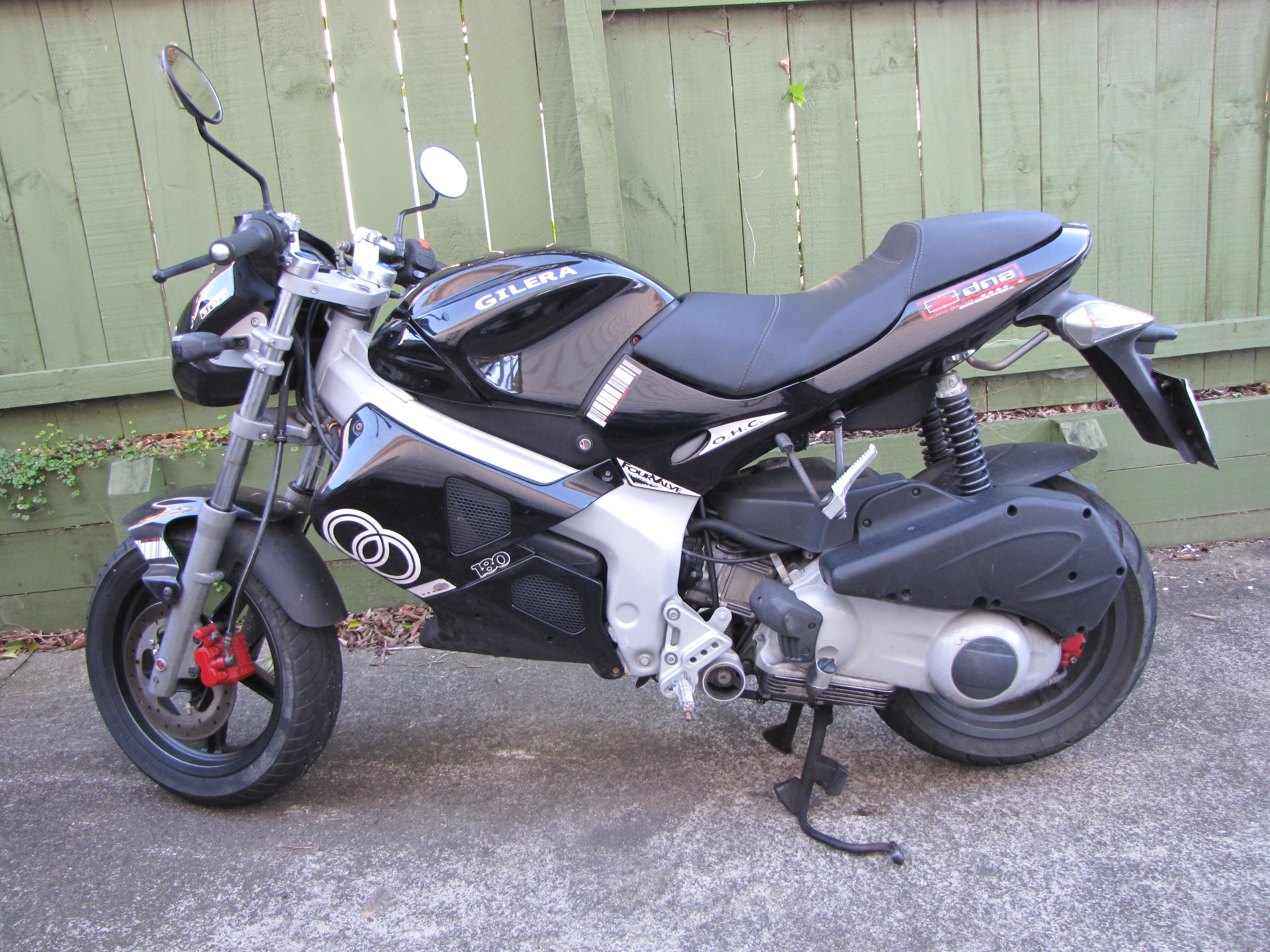
- DNA 180
- Manufacturer: Gilera
- Production: 1996–2009
- Class: Motorcycle/Scooter sport moped
- Engine: 50 cc (two-stroke liquid cooled); 125 cc (four-stroke liquid cooled); 180 cc (four-stroke liquid cooled)
- Transmission: Automatic
- Related: Gilera Runner

The Gilera DNA was a motorcycle produced by Gilera from 1996 to 2009.

== Description ==
The Gilera DNA is available in 50 cc, 125 cc, and 180 cc variants. It features a continuously variable transmission along with an electronic start. The 50 cc bike is limited to a top speed of 29 mph (47 km/h); the 125 cc is capable of 72 mph (116 km/h); and the 180 cc bike has a maximum speed of 88 mph (142 km/h). The 50 cc engine is a 2-stroke, while the 125 cc and 180 cc models are 4-stroke, all are single cylinder.

In 2005 Gilera released the 'RST' model which replaced the handlebars with a different design and featured a new colour scheme. This model was discontinued by Gilera in 2009].

The 125 cc bike was nominated for the "Machine of the Year" award by Motorcycle News in 2001.

	50 cc	125 cc	180 cc
Engine
Engine Type	49.4 cc (3.01 cu in) single cylinder two-stroke	124.2 cc (7.58 cu in) single cylinder four-stroke	181.7 cc (11.09 cu in) single cylinder four-stroke
Bore/Stroke	40 mm × 39.3 mm (1.57 in × 1.55 in)	57.0 mm × 48.6 mm (2.24 in × 1.91 in)	69.0 mm × 48.6 mm (2.72 in × 1.91 in)
Compression Ratio	12:1 (±0.7)		
Carburation	Carburetor Dell'Orto PHVA 17.5		
Drivetrain
Transmission	Automatic speed variation system by means of variable diameter pulleys, vee belt, centrifugal clutch and gear final drive		
Front Suspension	Hydraulic telescopic fork	Telescopic forks	
Rear Suspension	Single hydraulic shock absorber, coaxial helical spring, frame engine attachment with swinging arm	Swing arm and adjustable twin shock	
Front Brakes	Ø 240 mm (9.4 in) brake disc with dual piston calliper Ø 25 mm		
Rear Brakes	Ø 200 mm disc brake, caliper with 28 mm opposed pistons	Ø 240 mm (9.4 in) disc brake, caliper with two opposed pistons Ø 30 mm	
Front Tire	120/70-14"		
Rear Tire	140/70-14"	140/60-14"	
Electricity
Ignition	Electronic, a capacitor discharge microprocessor device, with built-in HV coil.	Electronic CDI with variable timing	
Battery	12V 4Ah		
Dimensions
Wheelbase	1,330 mm (52 in)	1,355 mm (53.3 in)	
Length	1,940 mm (76 in)		
Width	780 mm (31 in)		
Saddle Height	770 mm (30 in)		
Weight (dry)	112 kg (247 lb)	137 kg (302 lb)	
Liquids capacity
Fuel	9 L (2.0 imp gal; 2.4 US gal), including approximately 1.2 L (0.26 imp gal; 0.32 US gal) reserve		
Engine oil	1.3 L (0.29 imp gal; 0.34 US gal), including approximately 0.4 L (0.088 imp gal; 0.11 US gal) reserve	1 L (0.22 imp gal; 0.26 US gal) (approximately)	
Cooling system	0.9 L (0.20 imp gal; 0.24 US gal) (approximately)		
Performance
Power Output	3.3 kW (4 hp)	11 kW (15 hp) @ 9700 rpm	14 kW (19 hp) @ 8500 rpm
Torque	4.7 N-m @ 6000 rpm		
