= Piaggio X8 =

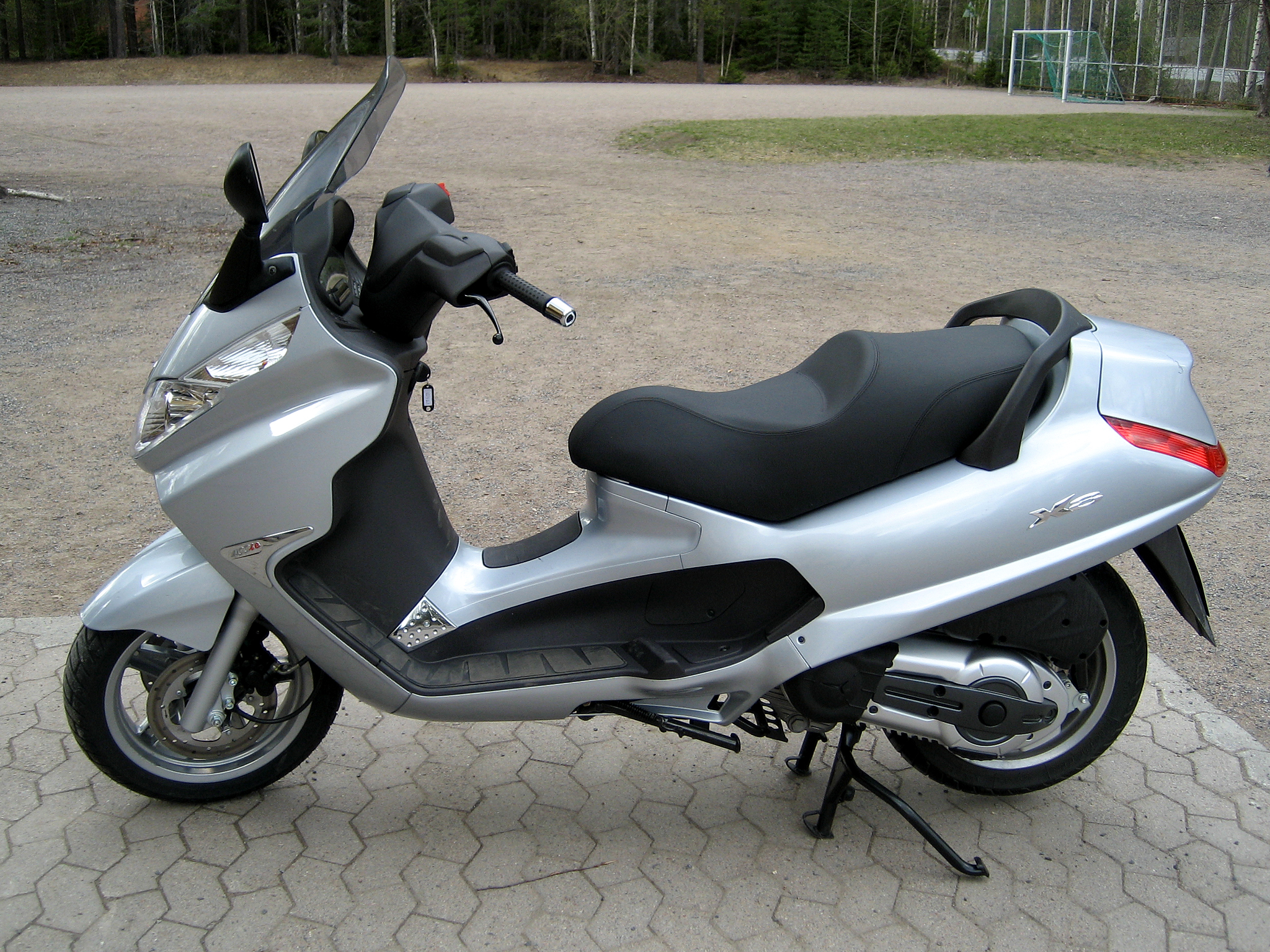
Piaggio X8 400 cc

The Piaggio X8 is an Italian-made motorcycle, released in 2004 and available in 125 cc, 150 cc (Street Version), 250 cc, and 400 engine sizes by Piaggio. It has now been replaced by the Piaggio Xevo.

== X8 250 cc ==
Now with a fuel injected Quasar engine that meets Euro 3 European emission standards. It comes with a windscreen and features a remote central locking style key that opens the front and rear storage compartments without having to put the key in the ignition, and an underseat storage space which is big enough to take two full-face helmets.

The X8 has 56 litres (2.0 cu ft) load capacity and dual access to the storage area. The under-seat storage area holds items up to 80 cm (31 inches) in length. The storage area also contains a foldaway seat cover and a courtesy light. The front shield provides further space to place small items or documents within easy reach and is also equipped with a 12 V plug to recharge a mobile phone.

The bike has an automatic twist and go transmission so there is no manual clutch/gears.
