= SFM Junak =

Polish motorcycle brand

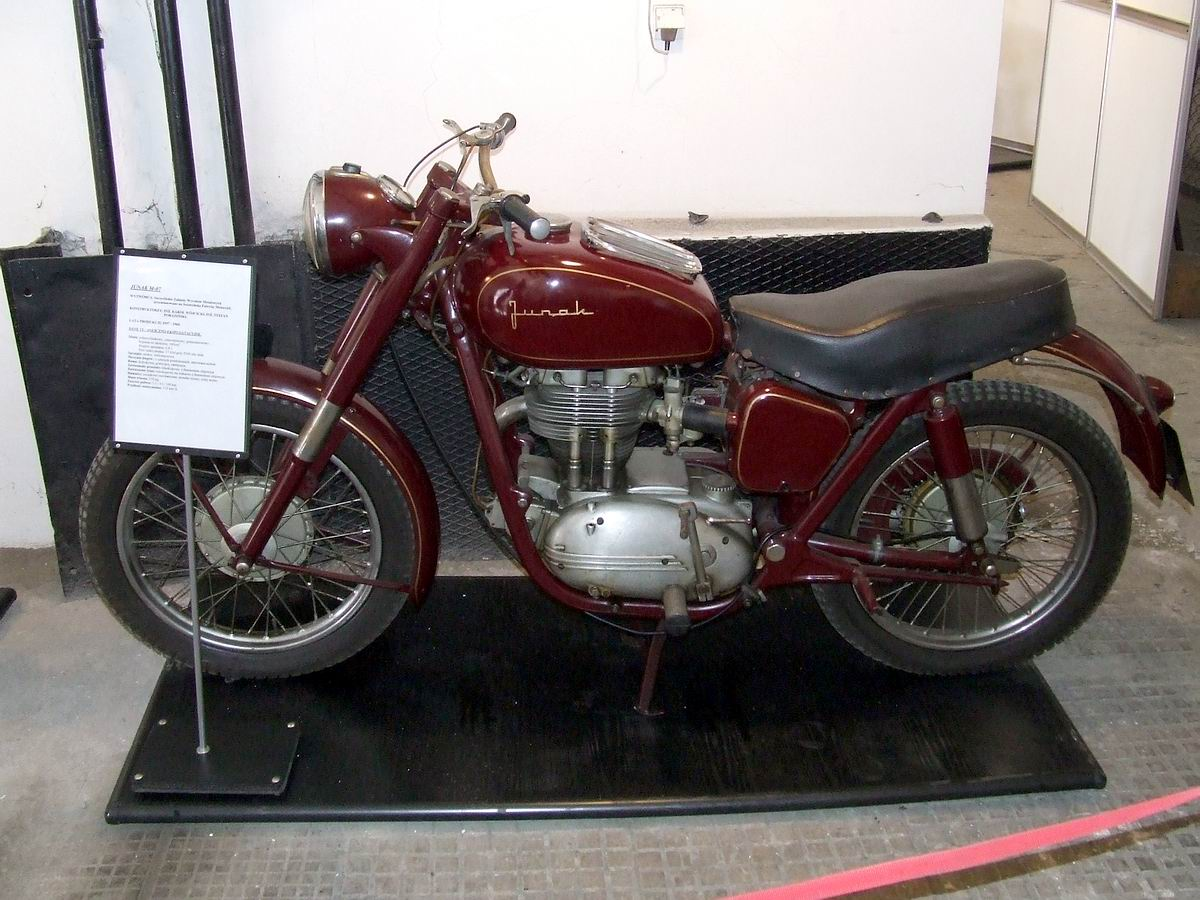
Junak M07

Junak is a brand of Polish motorcycles, the only four-stroke models produced in Poland between World War II and the Revolutions of 1989. The name literally means "brave young man". Produced by Szczecińska Fabryka Motocykli (SFM) (en.: Szczecin Factory Motorcycles) in three variants: M07, M10 and B20.

== History ==
During 1956–1965, a total of 91,000 Junak motorcycles were produced. Several models were produced, namely: 10,000 tourist M07, rally M07-R and cross M07-C models, 2,500 three-wheeled B20's, 8,500 sidecars type WB1 and W03 while the rest were M10 models. The Junak frame was produced by SFM in Szczecin while the engines were made by ZSM in Łódź. During the transition from model M07 to M10 from 1960 to 1961, about 20,000 M10 models possessed some characteristics of the M07 model such as the headlight housing. These are called the transition or in Polish “przejsciowka” models.

The Junak was designed in 1951–1952 in Biuro Konstrukcyjne Przemysłu Motoryzacyjnego (Automotive Industry Design Bureau) under the leadership of J. Ignatowicz. At that time Junak was superior to many well known motorcycles. This was not surprising since experienced engineers designed the Junak basing their knowledge on T. Rudawski's group. T. Rudawski was the father of pre-WWII Sokol motorcycles, which is why the Junak engine has many characteristics of the Sokół 600 and 500. The governing system and inconvenient localization of the production line led to difficulties in ensuring quality. The same reasons hindered the production of the newer engines S130, S131, and S132.

At the time of production Junak was a very expensive motorcycle for a common Polish worker. Eventually, a crash in the sales of large motorcycles led to a halt in production in 1965. Junak is called by some as “the Polish Harley”, being the heaviest Polish post-war motorcycle, recognized today commonly as a classic in Poland. Despite some of its shortcomings, Junak found many fans. Its characteristic exhaust and loud valve train are easily recognized, which is another similarity with the Sokół and the only with the Harley. Half a century later the Junak is still the most advanced Polish motorcycle in the heavy category as no other models were produced.

Since 2010, the company Almot imports motorcycles branded as Junak.

== Junak M10 Technical description ==
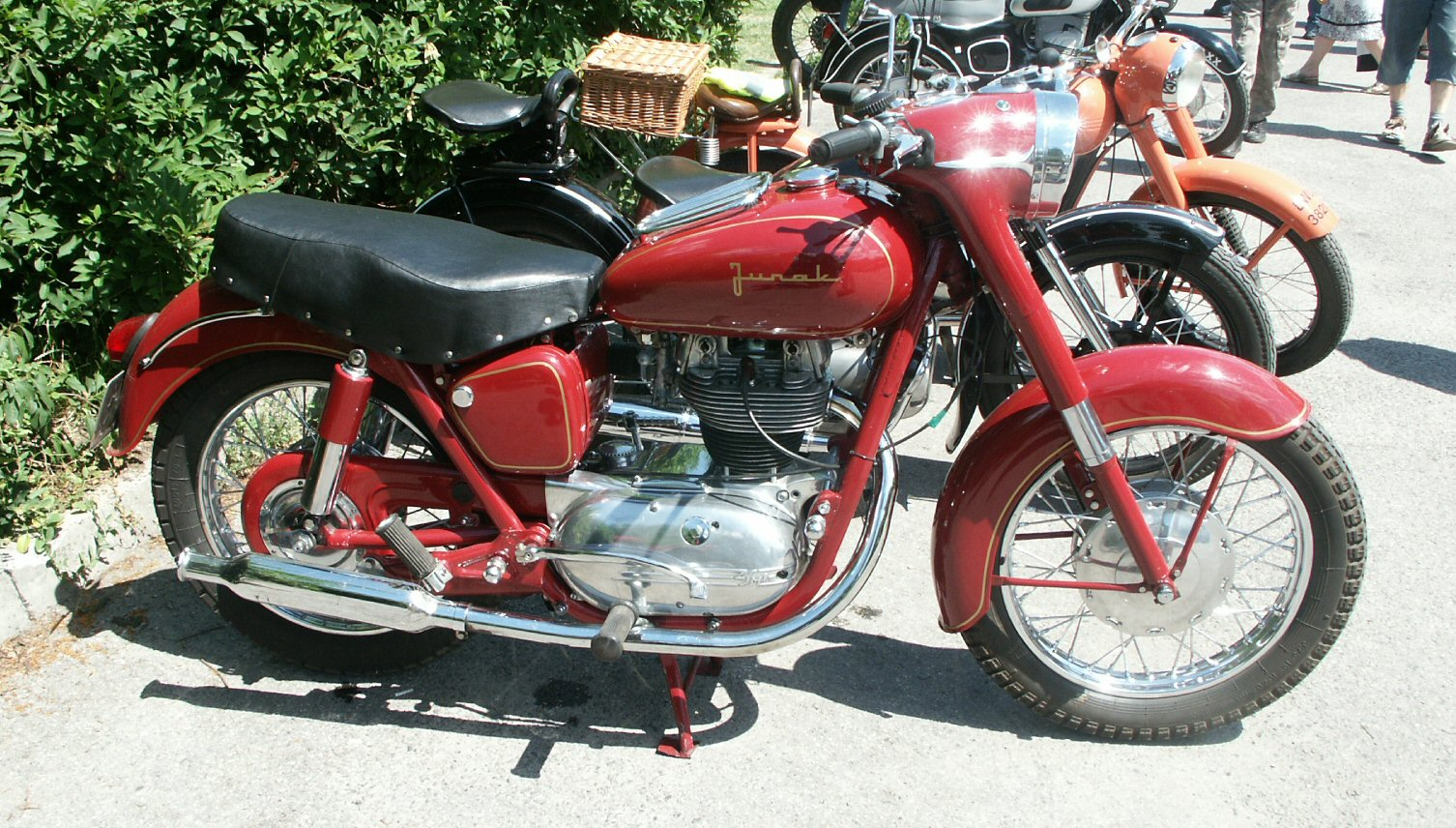
Junak M10

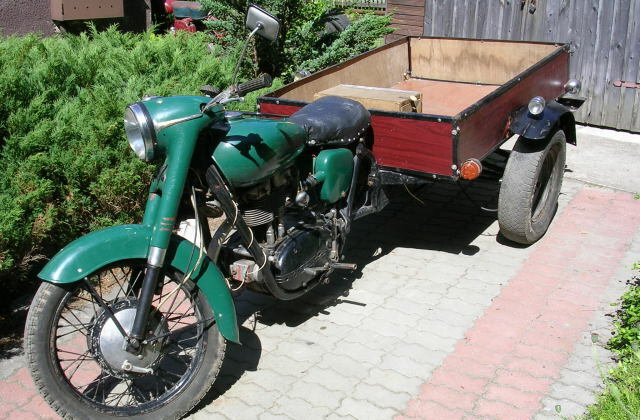
Junak B20

- Engine:
  - single-cylinder OHV four stroke
  - bore 75mm, stroke 79mm
  - cubic capacity 349ccm
  - compression ratio 7.0 to 1
  - max power 19 hp at 6000 rpm
  - dry-sump pressure lubrication
- Electric equipment:
  - ignition from magneto
  - 6V lighting system
  - 14Ah battery
  - 45W dynamo
- Power transmission:
  - multi-plate clutch with cork inserts working in an oil bath
  - four-speed constant-mesh gearbox
  - gearbox ratios: 1st gear - 3.04 to 1, 2nd gear - 1.97 to 1, 3rd gear - 1.294 to 1, 4th gear - 1,0 to 1.
  - gear changing by means of foot pedal
  - ratios: engine to clutch - 2.435 to 1, gearbox to rear wheel 2.53 to 1.
- Frame:
  - double, cardle-type, welded throughout of tubing, provided with holders for side car mounting.
  - front wheel suspension on telescopic fork with coil springs and oil damping,
  - rear wheel suspension on swinging arm sprung on telescopic elements with coil springs and oil damping.
- Brakes:
  - full hub width, of expander shoe type
  - front brake operated by hand, rear wheel brake - by foot.
- Wheels:
  - wire type, with full width hubs made of light alloy, interchangeable (also
  - with side-car wheel)
  - both wheels with quick-detachable spindles
  - tyres 3.50-19.
- Dimensions and Weights:
  - overall length - 2172mm
  - width - 740mm
  - height - 1095mm
  - saddle height - 755mm
  - wheelbase - 1417mm
  - dry weight - 170 kg
  - loading capacity - 200 kg
  - max speed - 125 km/h
  - fuel consumption - 3.5 L/100 km
