= Derbi GPR =

Street motorcycle sold by Derbi

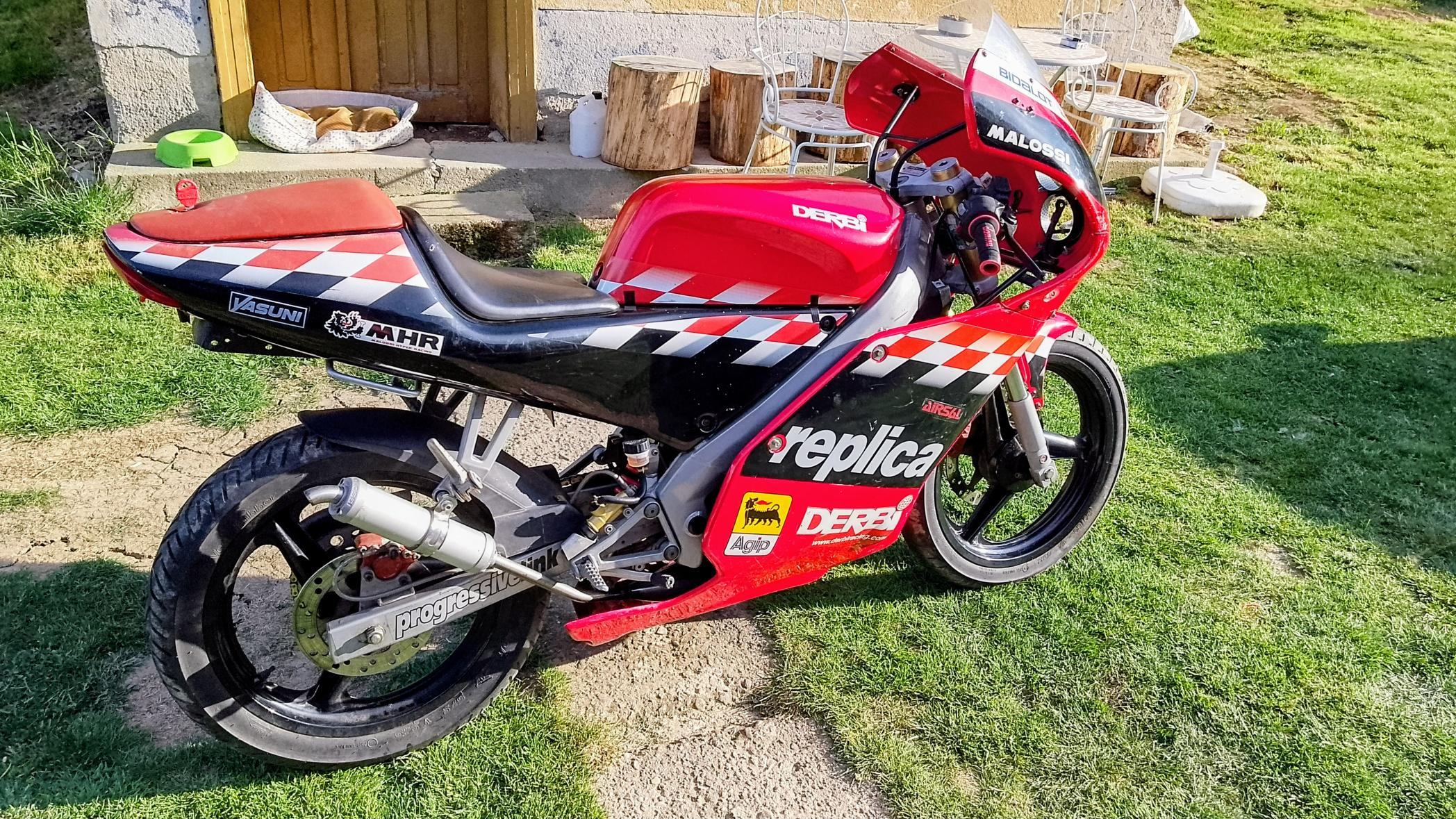
- 2003 Derbi GPR
- Manufacturer: Derbi
- Also called: Gilera SC125; Malaguti RST 125
- Parent company: Piaggio
- Production: 1990–2013
- Class: Sport bike
- Engine: 50–125 cc (3.1–7.6 cu in); 1990–2009: liquid cooled, two stroke 2010–2013: liquid cooled four stroke
- Bore / stroke: 1990–2009: 56.0 mm × 50.7 mm (2.20 in × 2.00 in); 2010–2013: 58.0 mm × 47.0 mm (2.28 in × 1.85 in)
- Compression ratio: 12.5:1
- Transmission: 6-speed
- Suspension: Ø40 mm upside-down fork. 110 mm. travel Rear: Monoshock. 110 mm travel, Adjustable Preload
- Brakes: Front: Single 300 mm Hydraulic Disc with Four Piston Radial Caliper; Rear: Single 180 mm Disc with Two-Piston Caliper
- Tires: Front: 100/80-17; Rear: 130/70-17
- Wheelbase: 53.34 in (1,355 mm)
- Dimensions: L: 79.68 in (2,024 mm); W: 28.34 in (720 mm); H: 45.66 in (1,160 mm)
- Weight: 225 lb (102 kg) (dry); 285 lb (129 kg) (wet)
- Fuel capacity: 3.4 US gallons (13 L; 2.8 imp gal)
- Oil capacity: 1.5 litres (1.6 US qt)

The Derbi GPR is a street motorcycle sold by Derbi from 1990 until 2013.

The original GPR was powered by a single-cylinder two-stroke engine with a steel lined cast iron cylinder manufactured by Yamaha, but was superseded in 2010 by an all-new DOHC four-stroke four-valve model. It was also sold in a naked variant called Derbi GPR Naked.

== Two-stroke GPR ==
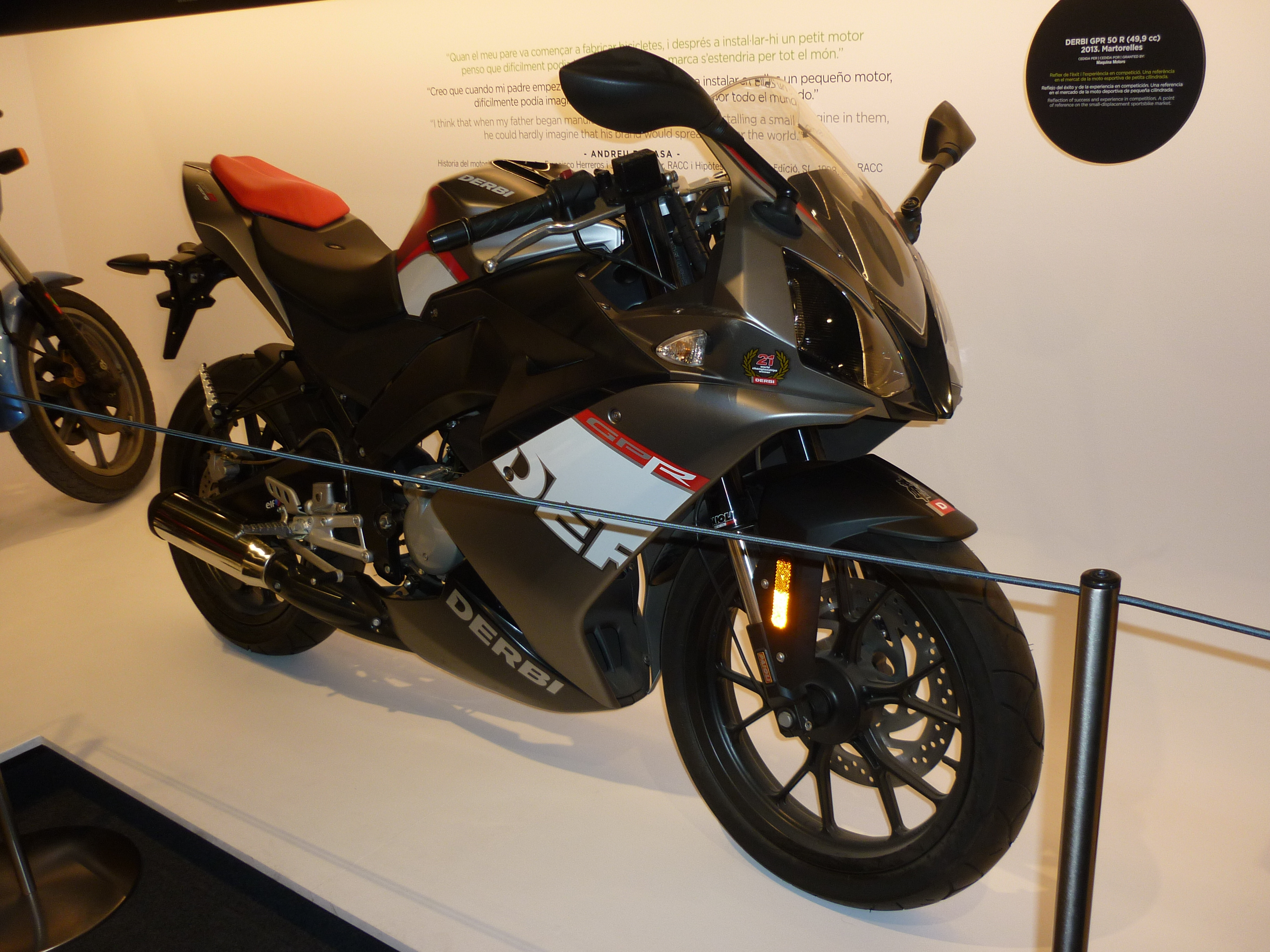
Derbi GPR 50

The engine in the original two-stroke model is sourced from Yamaha. This engine was used in the Yamaha DTR125 Dual Sport and TZR125 sport bike. Engine parts from these two bikes will directly swap with the Derbi. It uses the Yamaha Power Valve System, a two-stroke power valve system, which consists of a rotary valve located in the exhaust port which changes the exhaust port timing and area. The power valve is controlled by an ECU and servo motor.

== Four-stroke GPR ==
In 2010 the engine was changed to a new four-stroke engine. The single cylinder engine features double overhead camshafts and four valves.
