= Gilera Runner =

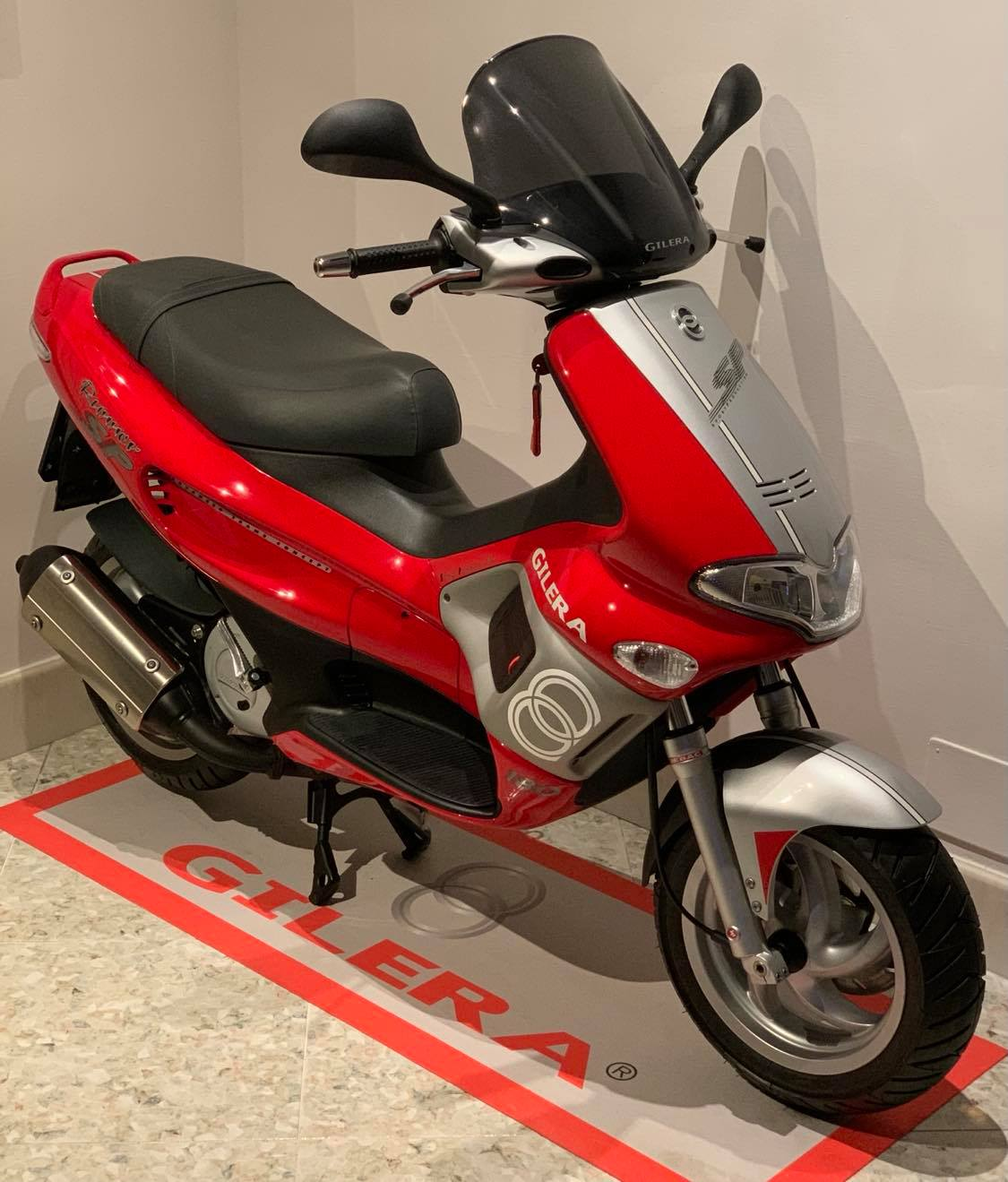
- Gilera Runner SP FXR180
- Manufacturer: Gilera
- Parent company: Piaggio & Co. SpA
- Production: 1997–2020
- Class: Scooter
- Engine: Two-stroke water cooled 50 cc (3.1 cu in), 125 cc (7.6 cu in), 180 cc (11 cu in), single Four-stroke water cooled 125 cc (7.6 cu in), 180 cc (11 cu in), 200 cc (12 cu in) four valve SOHC single
- Ignition type: Capacitor discharge ignition
- Transmission: Belt-driven continuously variable transmission (CVT)
- Related: Gilera DNA

The Gilera Runner is a scooter manufactured by Italian company Piaggio under the Gilera brand, designed by Luciano Marabese of Marabese Design Srl. It is noted for its unusual style, high performance and good handling. The Runner was initially only available with two stroke engines with 125 cc and 180 cc four stroke versions arriving in 1998 and the larger two stroke versions phased out. The model range was revised in 2005 with an all new model introduced in 2009. All 50 cc Runner models were restricted to 28 mph (45 km/h) to comply with European law. The 125, 180 and 200cc models were not restricted.

== Two stroke models ==
The first incarnation of the Gilera Runner was a 50 cc that was released in 1997 in Europe. The 50cc model went through a number of revisions; in 1998, a rear disc brake was added with the Gilera Runner 50DD (Double Disc). The colour scheme was also revised with the release of the Runner 50SP. The direct injection Runner Purejet 50 was released in 2003 with lower emissions.

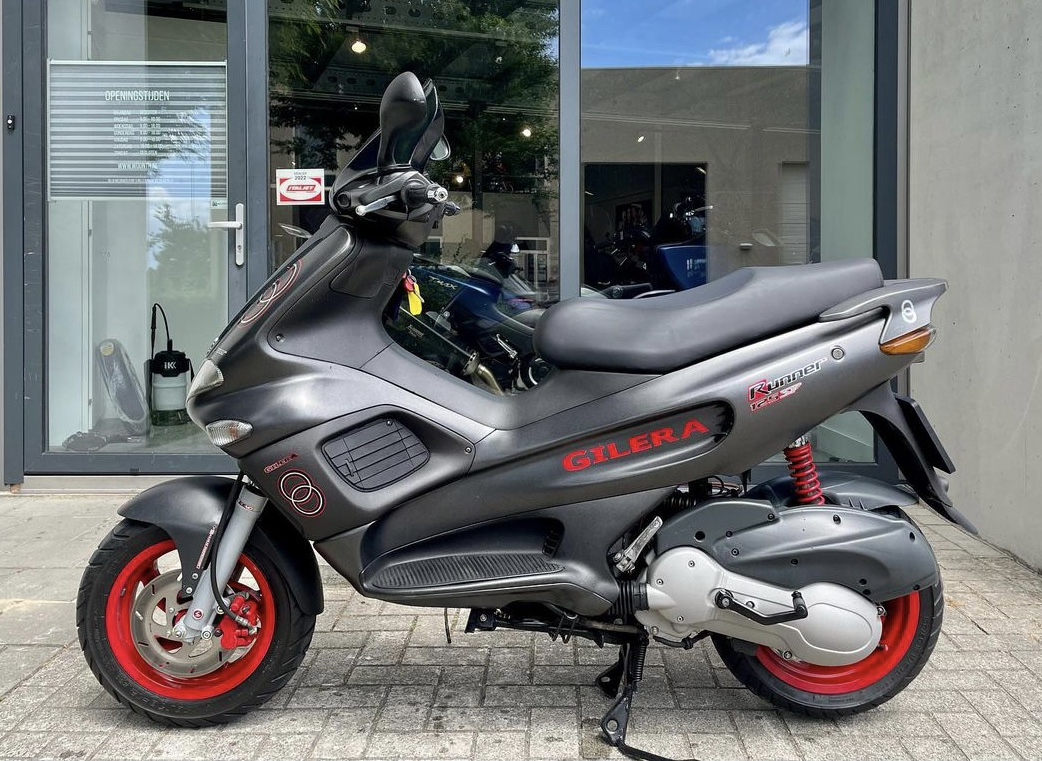
Gilera Runner SP125

In 1998, the 125 cc (7.6 cu in) FX Runner was introduced which had the same styling as the 50cc. In 1999, the SP model was released. The biggest difference between the FX (FXR) and the SP is the FX had a 9 L (2.0 imp gal; 2.4 US gal) petrol tank and battery stowed near the spark plug and a rear drum brake. The SP has a 12 L (2.6 imp gal; 3.2 US gal) petrol tank, the battery is stowed under the seat and it has a rear disc brake.

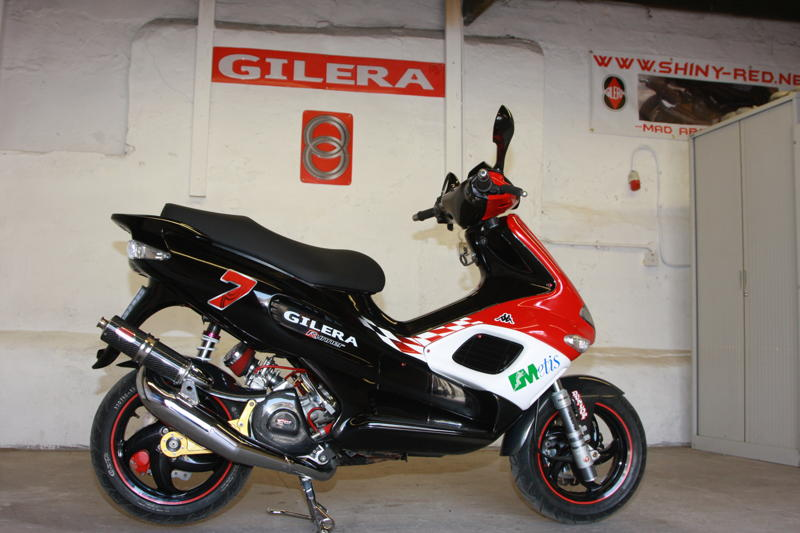
Gilera Runner FXR180

In 1999, the FXR 180 cc (11 cu in) was introduced and was by far the fastest of the Runners including the new generation 200 cc (12 cu in) four strokes. It was noted for its high performance and great handling. Unfortunately it has a high fuel consumption.

	50/DD/SP	Purejet	FX125	FXR180
Engine
Engine Type	49.3 cc (3.01 cu in) single cylinder two stroke		123.5 cc (7.54 cu in) single cylinder two stroke	175.8 cc (10.73 cu in) single cylinder two stroke
Bore/Stroke	40.0 mm × 39.3 mm (1.57 in × 1.55 in)		55.0 mm × 52.0 mm (2.17 in × 2.05 in)	65.6 mm × 52 mm (2.58 in × 2.05 in)
Compression Ratio		11.5:1 (±0.9)	9.8:1	9.9:1
Fuel system	Carburetor | PHVA 17.5mm Dell'Orto Carburetor	Fuel injection	Carburetor | PHVB 20.5mm Dell'Orto / Mikuni VM 20mm	Carburetor | PHVB 20.5mm Dell'Orto / Mikuni VM 20mm
Drivetrain
Transmission	CVT			
Front Suspension	Upside-down telescopic forks		Upside-down forks with double acting hydraulic damper; 83 mm (3.3 in) travel	
Rear Suspension	Swingarm and hydraulic monoshock	Swingarm and hydraulic monoshock	Hydraulic monoshock and coiler spring with four position rate adjustment Engine frame linkage with swinging arm; 60 mm (2.4 in) travel	
Front Brakes	Single disc		Ø 220 mm (8.7 in) disc brake with hydraulic linkage	
Rear Brakes	Drum (50) Single disc (DD/SP)	Single disc	Ø 140 mm (5.5 in) drum brake with mechanical linkage Ø 240 mm (9.4 in) disc brake with hydraulic linkage (1999-on)	
Front Tire	120/70-12"			
Rear Tire	130/70-12"		130/70-12" for rear drum brake models (1998) 130/60-13" for rear Disc brakes models (1999-on)	
Ignition	Electronic CDI with internal H.T. coil	Electronic ignition with H.T. coil controlled by the ECU	Variable ignition timing electronic CDI module with separate H.T. coil	
Dimensions
Trail	71 mm (2.8 in)			
Wheelbase	1,290 mm (51 in)		1,303 mm (51.3 in)	
Length	1,780 mm (70 in)	1,800 mm (71 in)	1,780 mm (70 in)	
Width	720 mm (28 in)			
Seat Height	815 mm (32.1 in)	830 mm (33 in)	815 mm (32.1 in)	
Kerb weight	98 kg (216 lb) (50) 93 kg (205 lb) (DD/SP)	89 kg (196 lb)	115 kg (254 lb)	
Liquids capacity
Fuel	8.5 L (1.9 imp gal; 2.2 US gal) (50/DD) 12 L (2.6 imp gal; 3.2 US gal) (SP)	12 L (2.6 imp gal; 3.2 US gal)	9 L (2.0 imp gal; 2.4 US gal) (1998); 12 L (2.6 imp gal; 3.2 US gal) (1999–on)	
Fuel reserve	1.5 L (0.33 imp gal; 0.40 US gal) (50/DD) 3 L (0.66 imp gal; 0.79 US gal) (SP)	3 L (0.66 imp gal; 0.79 US gal)	1.5 L (0.33 imp gal; 0.40 US gal) (1998) 3 L (0.66 imp gal; 0.79 US gal) (1999-on)	
Engine oil	1.8 L (0.40 imp gal; 0.48 US gal)			
Engine oil reserve	0.4 L (0.088 imp gal; 0.11 US gal)			
Cooling system	0.9 L (0.20 imp gal; 0.24 US gal)		1.7 L (0.37 imp gal; 0.45 US gal)	

== Four stroke models ==
The first generation of Gilera Runner had four-stroke variants added initially in VX 125 (124 cc) and VXR 180 guises. The VXR 180 was replaced by the larger capacity VXR 200 (198 cc) in mid 2002. The four-stroke Runner was equipped with a liquid cooled, four valve version of Piaggio's LEADER engine. All of these models came with an immobiliser with programmed keys.

	VX	VXR
Engine	124.2 cc (7.58 cu in) single cylinder four-stroke	181.7 cc (11.09 cu in) & 197.7 cc (12.06 cu in) single cylinder four-stroke
Bore/Stroke	57.0 mm × 72.0 mm (2.24 in × 2.83 in)	69.0 mm × 72.0 mm (2.72 in × 2.83 in) (180) 73.0 mm × 72.0 mm (2.87 in × 2.83 in) (200)
Compression ratio	10.5:1	10.5:1
Drivetrain
Transmission	CVT	
Front suspension	Conventional telescopic forks	
Rear suspension	Swingarm and adjustable twin shock	
Front brakes	Ø 220 mm (8.7 in) disc brake with hydraulic linkage	
Rear brakes	Ø 220 mm (8.7 in) disc brake with hydraulic linkage	
Front Tire	120/70-12"	
Rear Tire	130/70-12"	
Ignition	Electronic CDI module	
Dimensions
Wheelbase	1,350 mm (53 in)	
Length	1,900 mm (75 in)	
Width	750 mm (30 in)	
Seat height	815 mm (32.1 in)	
Kerb weight	132 kg (291 lb)	
Liquids capacity
Fuel	12 L (2.6 imp gal; 3.2 US gal)	
Fuel reserve	3 L (0.66 imp gal; 0.79 US gal)	
Engine oil	1 L (0.22 imp gal; 0.26 US gal)	
Cooling system	0.9 L (0.20 imp gal; 0.24 US gal)	

== Second Generation (2005) ==
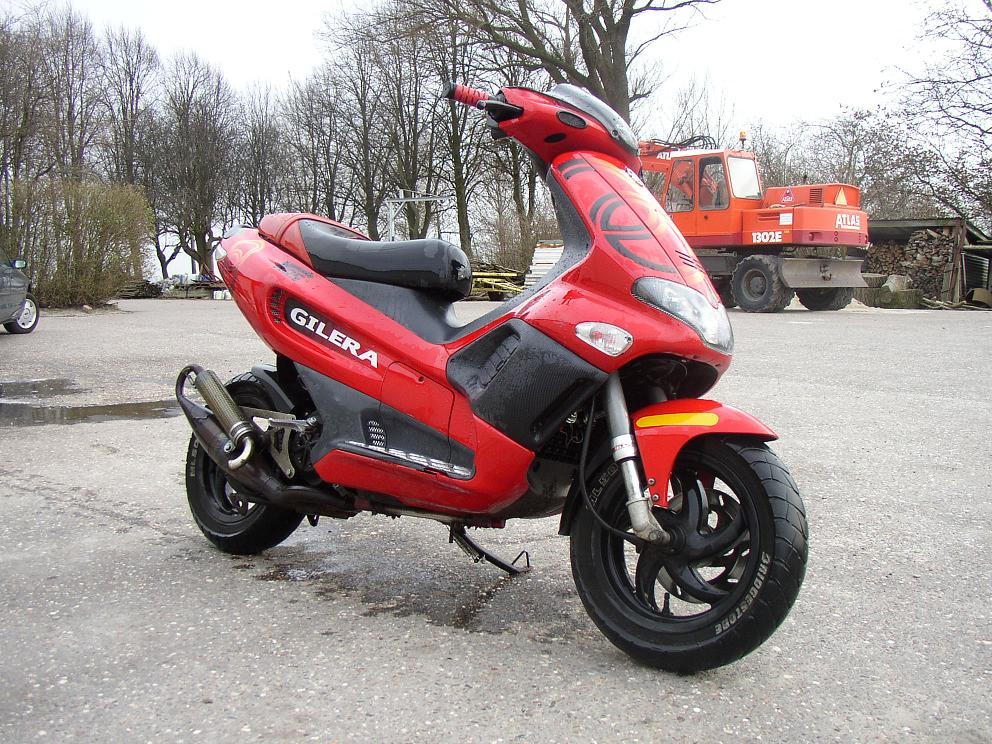
- Engine: Two-stroke water cooled Piaggio Hi-PER2 PRO 49.4 cc (50SP); Four-stroke water cooled 124.0 cc (125), 198.0 cc (200)
- Transmission: Belt-driven continuously variable transmission (CVT)

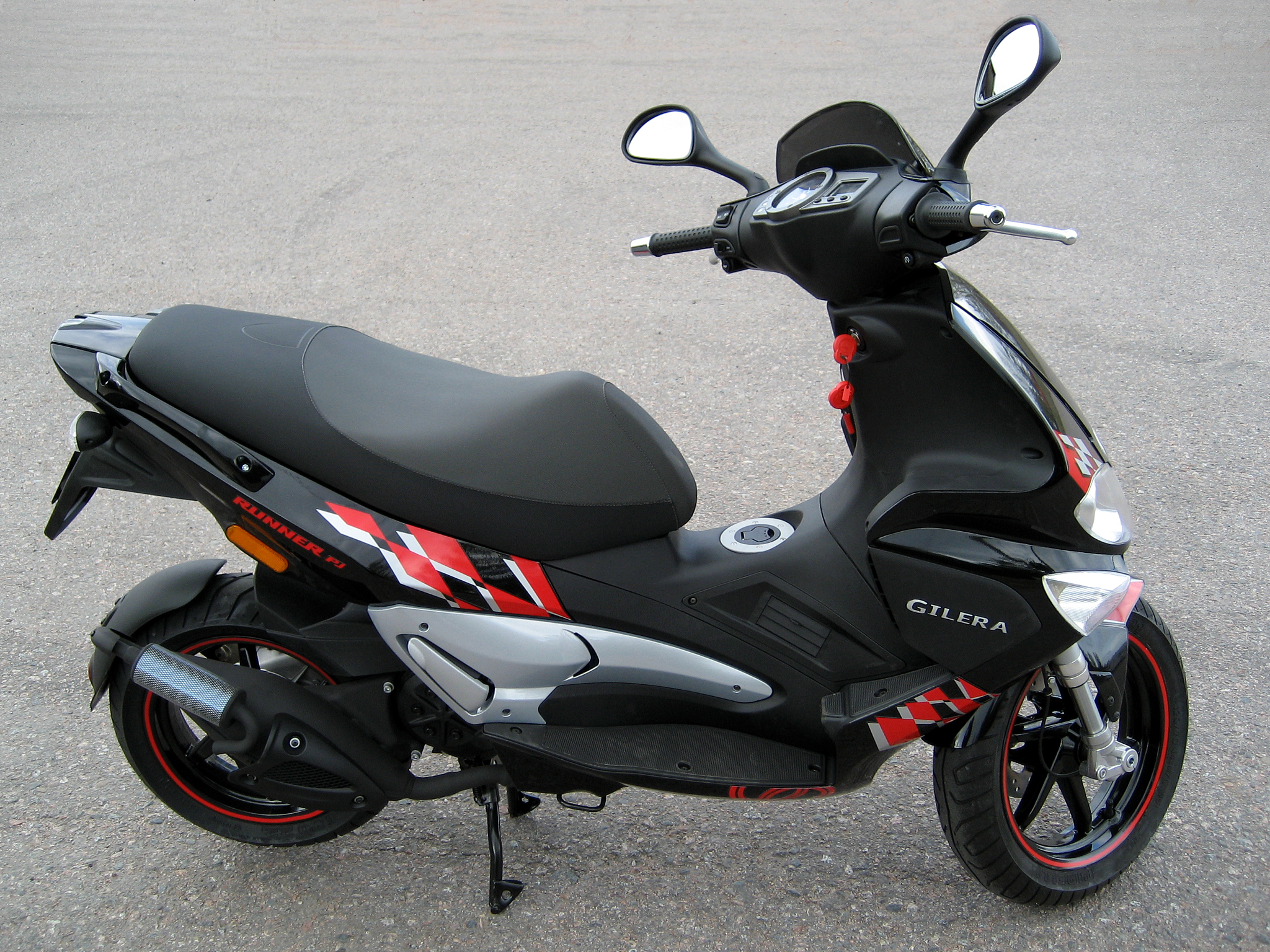
2007 Gilera Runner Purejet 50

A second generation of the Runner saw the first major redesign since its original introduction. The revised models were launched in 2005 with a line up of three models which consisted of the two-stroke carburetor SP 50, fuel injected Purejet 50 and the four-stroke VX 125. A revised VXR 200 became available in spring 2006.

The current model line up consists of Runner ST 125 and Runner ST 200 which utilize the LEADER 4-valve engine. Now Runner has an analog-digital board, bigger wheels, the seat opens by pressing the steering wheel lock.

On two-stroke models the oil filler hole has now been moved under the front of the seat, and there is a basic tool in the small compartment at the back.

The 2008 models had minor updates.

	50SP	Purejet	VX/ST	VXR/ST
Engine	49.4 cc (3.01 cu in) single cylinder two-stroke		124.0 cc (7.57 cu in) single cylinder four-stroke	198 cc (12.1 cu in) single cylinder four-stroke
Bore × stroke	40 mm × 39.3 mm (1.57 in × 1.55 in)		57.0 mm × 48.6 mm (2.24 in × 1.91 in)	72.0 mm × 48.6 mm (2.83 in × 1.91 in)
Compression ratio	12:1 (±0.7)	11.5:1 (±0.9)	12:1 (±0.5)	11.5:1 (±0.5)
Carburation	Carburetor Dell'Orto PHVA 17.5 ID	N/A	30mm Keihin CVK30 Carburetor	
Drivetrain
Transmission	CVT			
Front suspension	Upside-down telescopic forks with Ø 30 mm stanchion and dual-effect damper		Hydraulic double-acting telescopic forks with Ø 35 mm stems	
Rear suspension	Single hydraulic shock absorber, coaxial helical spring, frame engine attachment with swinging arm		Coaxial spring and hydraulic shock absorber. Chassis to engine support with swinging arm	
Front brake	Ø 220 mm (8.7 in) disc brake with hydraulic linkage (r.h. brake lever)		Ø 240 mm (9.4 in) disc brake with hydraulic control activated by handlebar right lever	
Rear brake	Ø 175 mm (6.9 in) disc brake (hydraulically controlled via lever on left hand side of handlebar)		Ø 220 mm (8.7 in) disc brake with twin plunger calipers, with hydraulic control by a handlebar left lever.	
Front tire	120/70-14"			
Rear tire	140/60-13"			
Ignition	Electronic CDI module with incorporated H.T. coil	Electronic ignition with H.T. coil controlled by the ECU	Electronic CDI and variable advance, with separate H.T. coil	
Dimensions
Wheelbase	1,270 mm (50 in)		1,340 mm (53 in)	
Length	1,840 mm (72 in)		1,890 mm (74 in)	
Width	750 mm (30 in)			
Seat height	815 mm (32.1 in)			
Fuel capacity	7 L (1.5 imp gal; 1.8 US gal)		8.5 L (1.9 imp gal; 2.2 US gal)	
