= Yamaha YSR50 =

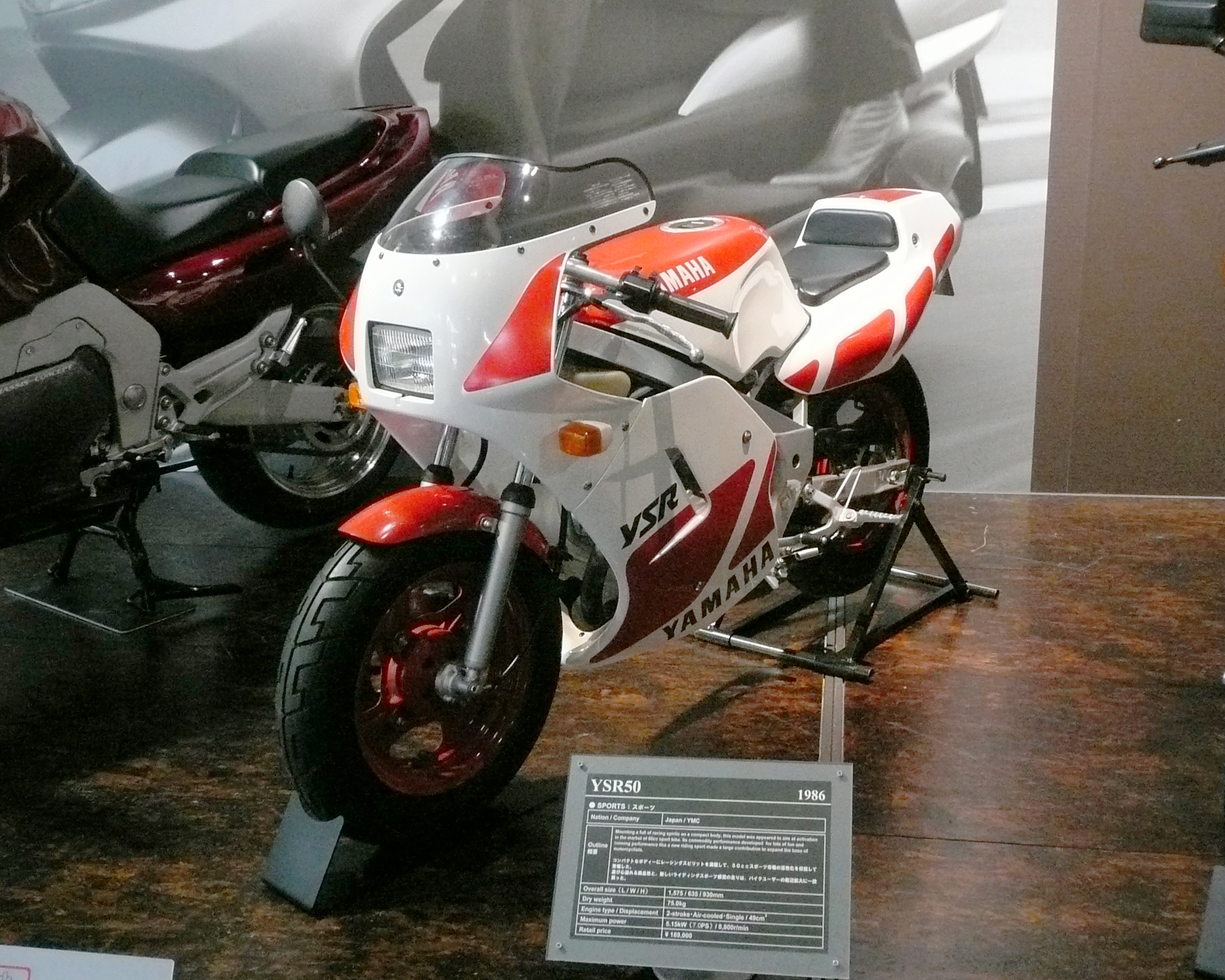
- Manufacturer: Yamaha Motor Company
- Production: 1986–1992
- Class: Minibike
- Engine: 49.3 cc (3.01 cu in), two-stroke, air-cooled, single
- Transmission: 5-speed manual
- Wheelbase: 41.4 in (1,050 mm)
- Seat height: 25.59 inches (650mm)
- Weight: 165.35lbs (75kg) (dry)
- Fuel capacity: 2.1 gallons

The Yamaha YSR50 is a miniature motorcycle that was produced and sold by Yamaha during the late 1980s and early 1990s. The bike featured an air-cooled 50 cc (3.1 cu in) two-stroke engine. The engine was sometimes swapped out for a larger variety.

Its first production year was 1986, and it was last manufactured in 1992. American Motorcyclist magazine stated its top speed was 38 mph (61 km/h).

== History ==
The first production model was introduced in Japan in 1986, and had the looks of a re-shaped and scaled down version of the YZR 500. It had a front disc brake and a rear drum brake.

In the United States, it was difficult to consider the bike a moped, because of its 5-speed manual transmission.

Color Scheme History
1987	White/Red	
1988	White/Red	Blue/Yellow
1989	White/Red	White/Blue
1990	White/Red	Black/Gray
1991	White/Red	Black/Yellow
1992	White/Red	Black/Yellow
