= SIP Scootershop =

German manufacturer and dealer of motorcycle and motorscooter parts and accessories

- Type: GmbH
- Industry: Motorcycles
- Founded: 1994
- Founders: Alexander Barth, Ralf Jodl
- Fate: active
- Headquarters: Landsberg am Lech, Germany
- Products: Motorcycles, Motorcycle parts
- Revenue: €46.2 million (2024)
- Number of employees: 169 (2024)
- Website: www.sip-scootershop.com

SIP Scootershop is a German manufacturer and dealer of motorcycle and motorscooter parts and accessories. They specialise in spare parts and accessories for scooters by Piaggio (Vespa) and Lambretta.

== History ==
In 1989, Alexander Barth and Ralf Jodl started building spare parts for Vespas in their basements which they initially sold out of a car boot, and at local rallies. They also began importing scooter parts from Italy which they sold off to their friends. This developed into a business Jodl and Barth carried out from the Barth family's garage, and later, their garden shed in Kaufering. In 1994, they officially founded their startup company. The company's name has since been SIP Scootershop; SIP is an abbreviation for "Scooter Innovation Parts". In 1996 the company moved into former barracks in Landsberg and expanded their online-shop to 10 languages.

In 2002, SIP Scootershop moved their facilities into a new location in Landsberg. In 2005, the company founded their own racing team, the SIP/Stoffis Racing Team. In 2014 SIP Scootershop started planning a new logistics and administration building in Landsberg, which was finished and taken into use in 2016. The facilities also include a flagship store. In 2016, SIP Scootershop was awarded the "Catalogue of the Year" award at the annual multi-channel congress Neocom. Eventually, the company has grown to "the world's largest supplier of scooter parts".

In 2026, SIP Scootershop became official international partner for the Jogja Scooter Parade 2026 in Indonesia. The same year, SIP Scootershop won the German Design Award with their annual customer magazine Curve. The magazine was named a winner in the category "Excellent Communication Design".

== Company structure ==
SIP Scootershop is registered as a Gesellschaft mit beschränkter Haftung (equivalent to an LLC). The headquarters are located at Landsberg am Lech. Founders and managing directors of the company are Alexander Barth and Ralf Jodl. In 2020, the company generated a revenue of 26 million Euros.

The facilities in Landsberg consist of 7,000 square meters of storage space and include a 300 square meter flagship store. 97% of the sales are processed through their online shop. The company is considered to be the world market leader in the field of Vespa spare parts and accessories.

Since 2000, SIP Scootershop has been a recognised IHK training and apprenticeship facility.

== Products ==
SIP Scootershop develops and sells spare parts and accessories for classic and modern Vespa and Lambretta scooters as well as various scooter and maxi scooter models. They offer over 55,000 parts such as tuning accessories, spares and add-ons as well als merchandise, helmets and visors and reading material such as catalogues, instruction manuals and magazines. SIP Scootershop also sells original parts by Piaggio and Vespa as well as over 55,000 other parts by brands such as Dell'Orto, Malossi, Polini, Bell, Bandit, Premier, 70s, DMD, Tucano Urbano, or REV’IT!. For their 25th anniversary, SIP built customised scooters: a 71 bhp Vespa PX sprinter scooter called the Silver Special, and a 30 bhp show scooter, the Pordoi racer. For the 30th anniversary in 2024, the company developed its own custom Vespa, the Vespa Tribute.

== Events ==
SIP Scootershop organises four big public events every year: the Open Day at the beginning of May, the "SIP Joyride", a ride with Vespa scooters in which participants ride from the SIP headquarters through Landsberg around the Ammersee, the quarter-mile drag race "Tacho Karacho" in July which is part of the race series Deutsche Blechrollermeisterschaft under the umbrella of the DMV Deutscher Motorsport Verband and a scooter pilgrimage to Hoher Peißenberg in September with a thanksgiving for an accident-free season. On 4 May 2019, SIP Scootershop celebrated its 25th anniversary with an event at their headquarters in Landsberg. During summer of 2020 SIP organised a scooter road trip to Corsica.

In July 2024, the "Matscho Karatscho" scooter cross race in Landsberg took place for the third time. The SIP Scootershop Open Day in May 2025 in Landsberg attracted over 3,500 visitors, which was a new record.
