= Piaggio 1 =

Electric motorcycle

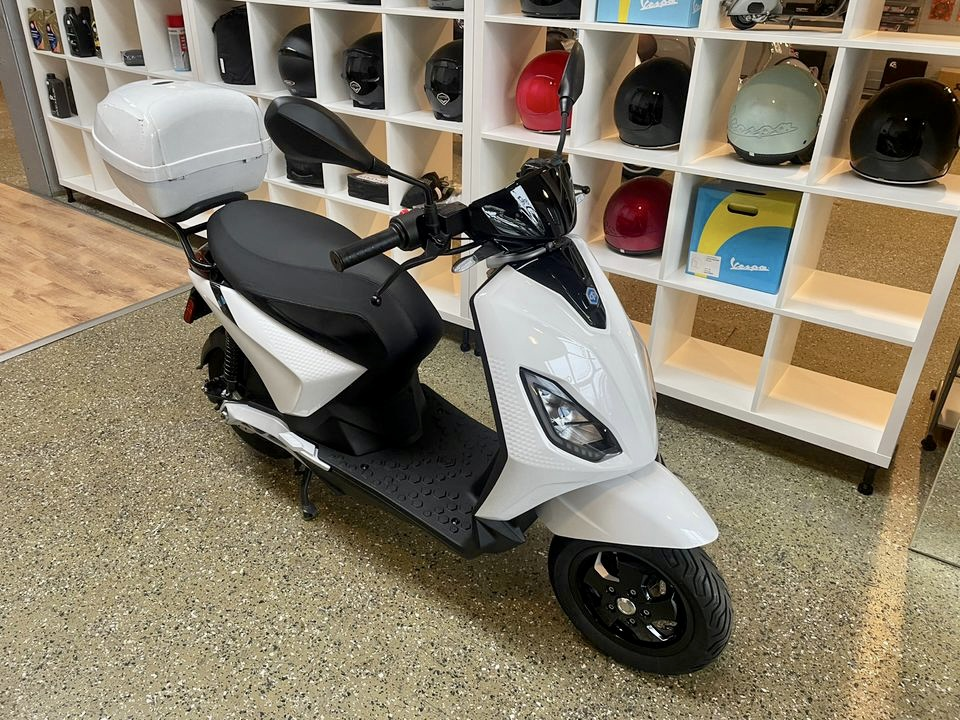
- Manufacturer: Piaggio
- Production: 2021–present
- Assembly: Pontedera, Italy; Foshan, China
- Class: Scooter
- Top speed: 45 km/h (base); 60 km/h (Active)
- Power: 1.2 kW (1.34 kW peak) (base); 2.0 kW (3.0 kW peak) (Active)
- Wheelbase: 1220 mm
- Dimensions: L: 1680 mm W: 750 mm H: 1080 mm
- Seat height: 770 mm
- Weight: 85 kg (base); 94 kg (Active) (wet)

The Piaggio 1 is an electric motorcycle produced by the Italian manufacturer Piaggio.

== History ==
Announced on social network TikTok in the spring of 2021 with the name Piaggio One the vehicle is presented in world premiere at the Beijing Auto Show on May 28 and sales are launched on the European market and on the Asian one in September of the same year renamed Piaggio 1. Production takes place in China at the joint venture Zongshen Piaggio plant in Foshan.

It is the first scooter of Piaggio to be produced exclusively in the electric version and is positioned lower in terms of prices and dimensions than the Vespa Elettrica. Aesthetically, it has a design inspired by the latest generation of Piaggio Zip, also produced in China and which enjoys good success on this market. The front shield has two LED lights, the central platform is flat, and the starting is keyless.

The frame of the Piaggio 1 is of the high-strength single-sided steel type with elements in pressed sheet metal and hydraulic single shock absorber at the front and fork telescopic while at the rear there is a double shock absorber with swingarm; the braking system consists of disc front and rear both 175 mm. The wheels are 10”. Only the Active version has CBS combined braking.

The wheelbase measures 1,220 mm, the overall length is 1,680 mm while the height of the saddle is 770 mm. The compartment under the saddle houses the battery and a full jet helmet.

== Versions ==
The Piaggio 1 is available in two versions: the "base" and the "Active".

The "base" is homologated as a moped (drivable at age 14 like a fifty) has a speed limited to 45 km/h, the electric motor delivers a power of 1.2 kW and the lithium-ion battery has a capacity of 1.4 kWh which weighs 10 kg (85 kg is the total weight of the vehicle). The approved range is 55 km in Eco mode and 43 km in Sport (WMTC cycle).

The more powerful "Active" version delivers 2 kW of power and is self-controlled for a maximum speed of 60 km/h, features a 2.3 kWh lithium-ion battery weighing 15 kg (94 kg the total weight of the vehicle). The autonomy is 85 km in Eco mode and 66 km in Sport mode in the WMTC homologation cycle.

All models have an extractable battery that can be recharged in six hours (with a voltage of 220V) with an efficiency of up to 800 complete charging cycles; over 800 cycles it retains 70% of its capacity. The kinetic energy recovery system (KERS, Kinetic Energy Recovery System) is standard, which recharges the battery during deceleration phases.
