= Piaggio Medley =

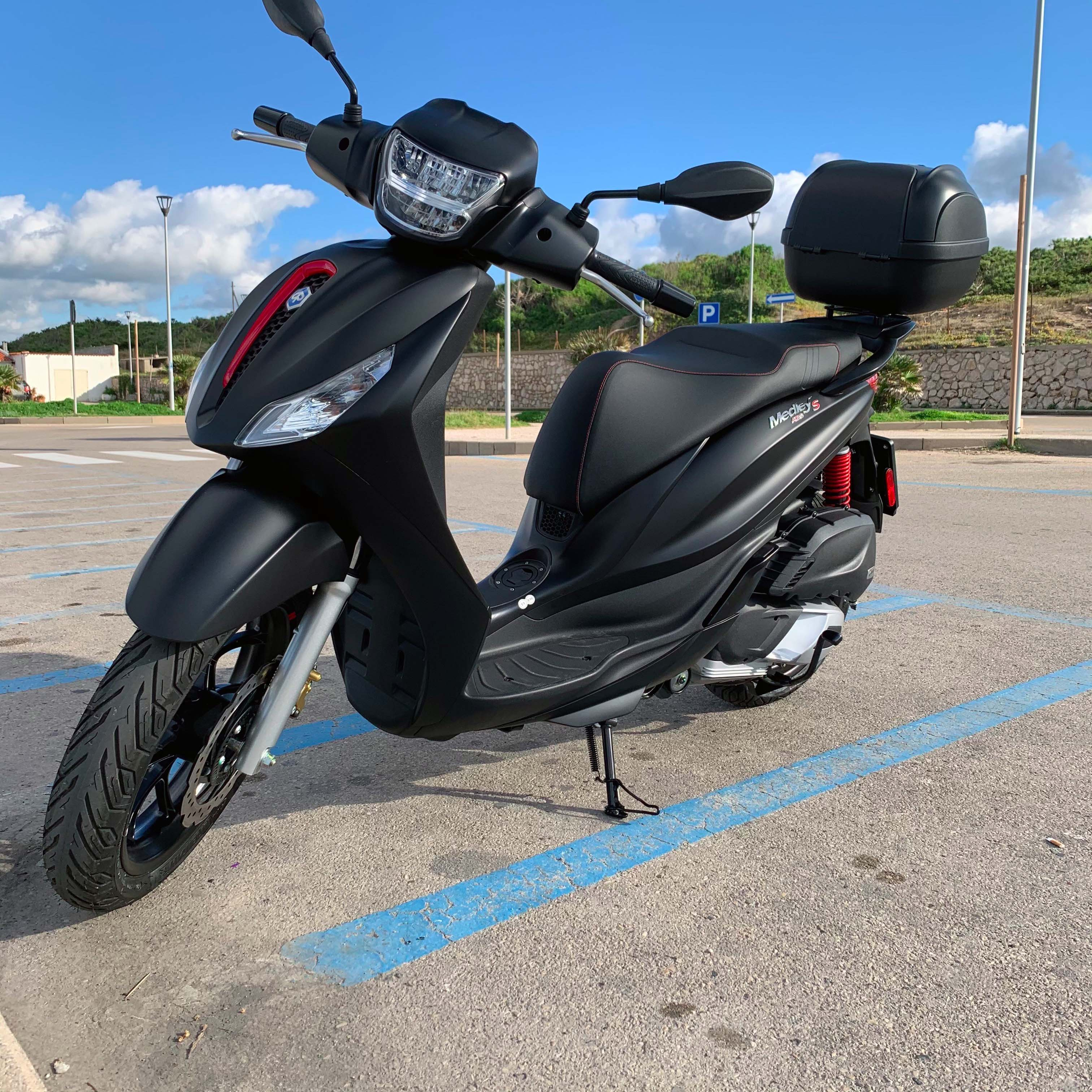
- 2020 Piaggio Medley S.
- Manufacturer: Piaggio
- Production: 2015–present
- Assembly: Pontedera, Italy
- Class: Scooter

The Piaggio Medley is a scooter produced by the Italian vehicle manufacturer Piaggio.

== Model history ==
Presented at the EICMA in November 2015, the Medley, similarly to its predecessor Carnaby, is smaller than the Beverly but more spacious than the entry level Liberty, classifying itself as an intermediate model within the manufacturer's price list. In 2020, it underwent a restyling of the front which also introduced an LED headlight, mounting new more powerful engines, a wider rear tyre.

== Specifications ==
The Medley offers two engines, one of 125 and another of 150 cm^{3}, it is then offered in two versions: Medley "base" and Medley S. The latter, in addition to differing in color, boasts some red colored details.
