= Piaggio Zip =

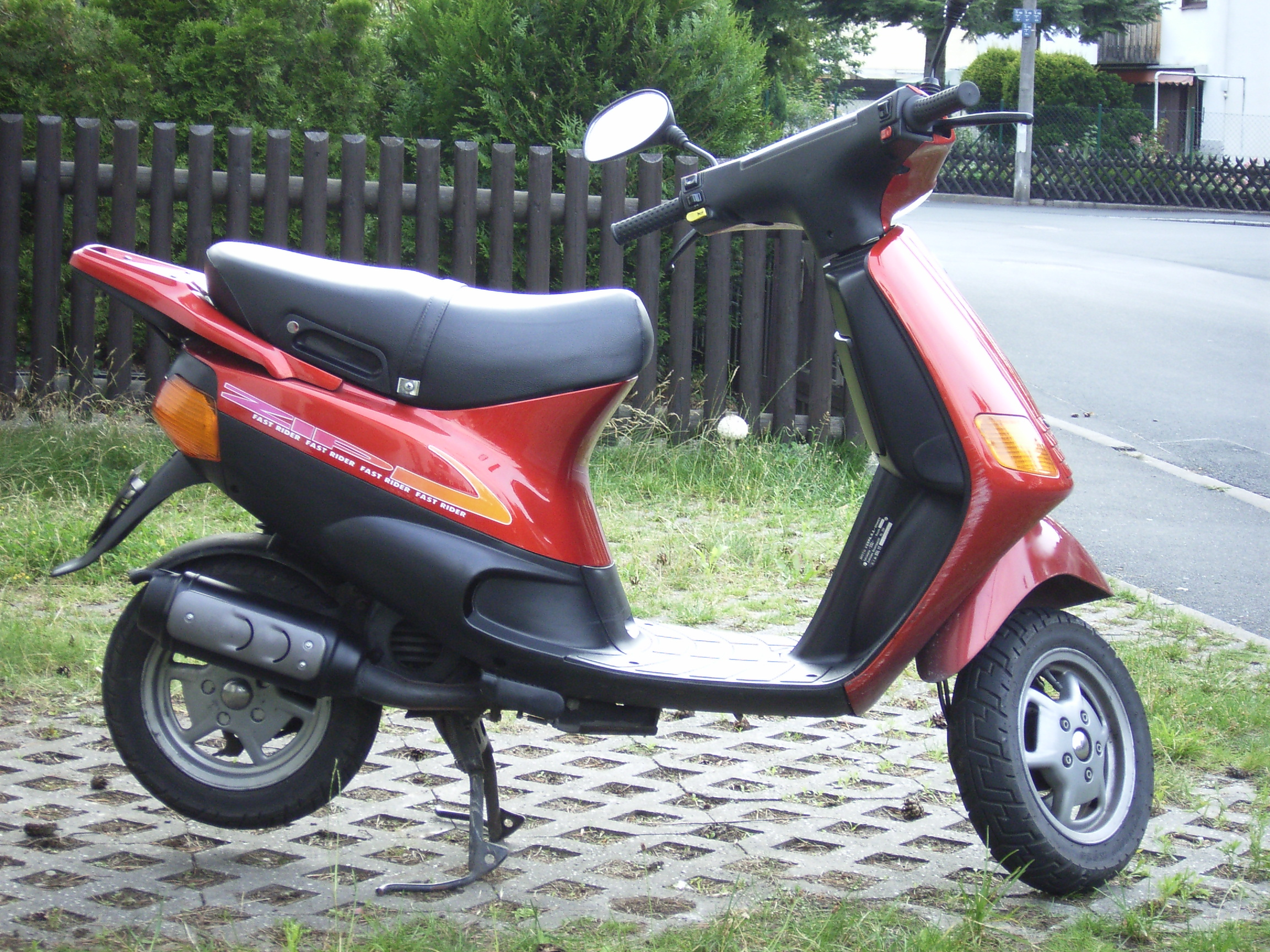
- Piaggio Zip Fast Rider 1996
- Manufacturer: Piaggio
- Also called: Gilera Easy Moving; Puch Zip (Netherlands)
- Production: 1992–2024
- Assembly: Madrid, Spain; Pontedera, Italy; Foshan, China; Vĩnh Phúc, Vietnam
- Class: Scooter
- Engine: 50 cc (3.1 cu in); 100 cc (6.1 cu in); 125 cc (7.6 cu in)
- Ignition type: Capacitor discharge electronic ignition (CDI)
- Transmission: CVT automatic; gear final drive
- Frame type: Tubular steel spine
- Brakes: Front; disc Rear; expanding drum
- Fuel capacity: 4 L (0.88 imp gal; 1.1 US gal) (1st gen); 7.5 L (1.6 imp gal; 2.0 US gal) (2nd gen)

The Piaggio Zip is a scooter manufactured by Piaggio. All Zip models have a CVT automatic transmission, sometimes referred to as a twist & go transmission due to its lack of gears and use of an automatic centrifugal clutch, sharing several components with other models in the range. Several companies such as Malossi, Polini and PM Tuning offer an extensive catalogue of tuning parts for the 50 cc and 125 cc models.

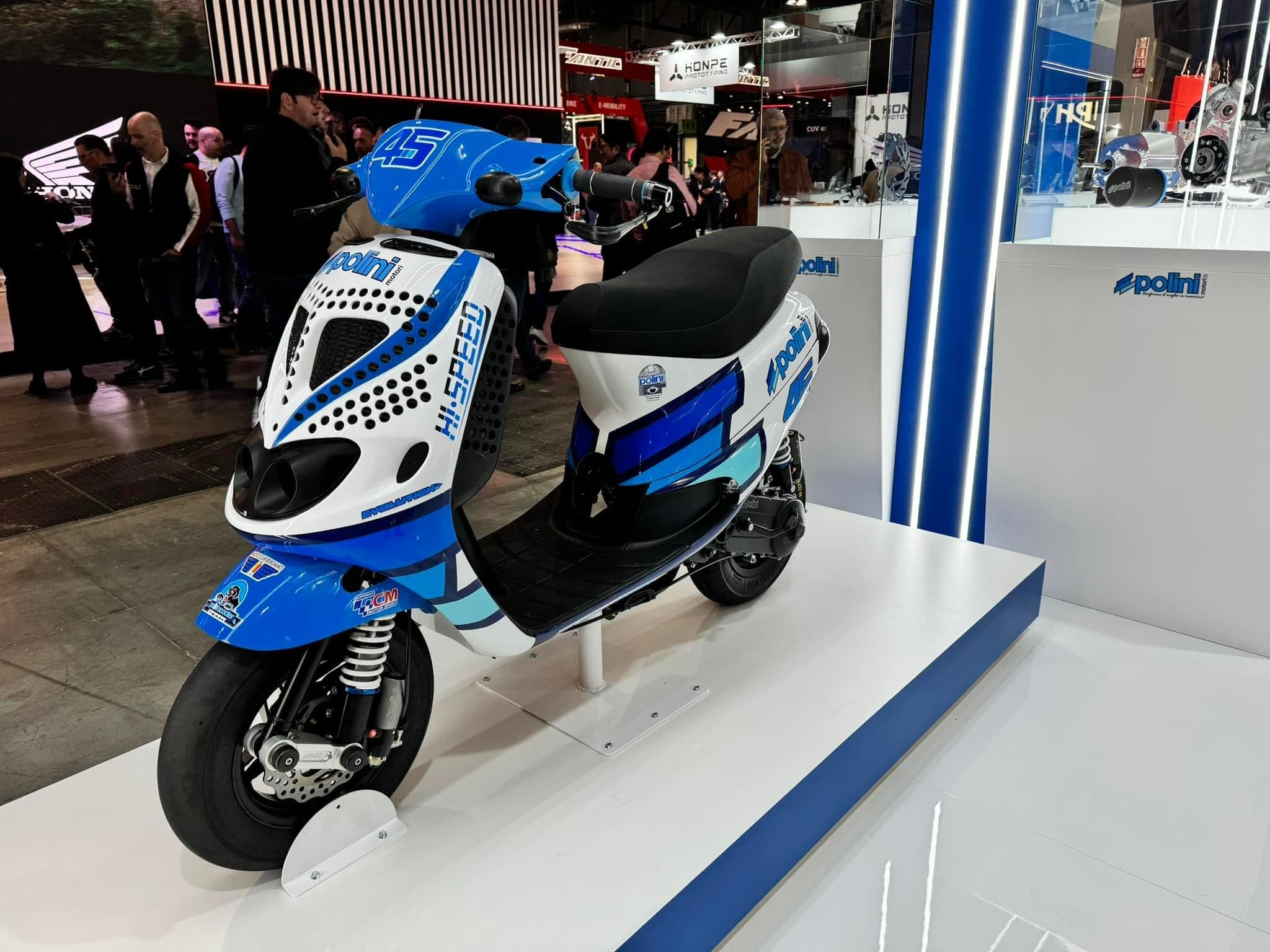
Piaggio Zip Polini

== History ==
The first generation Zip was only available as a 49 cc (3.0 cu in) two stroke. The base Zip model was air-cooled, with early models equipped with drum brakes front and rear. The Zip SP model was water-cooled and had single sided front suspension. The fuel tank had a capacity of 4 L (0.88 imp gal; 1.1 US gal) A 70 cc (4.3 cu in) machine based on the Zip SP with a 16 bhp (12 kW) Malossi equipped engine was raced by a young Leon Haslam to win the 1997 Gilera Scooter Championship title.

In 2000 Piaggio introduced a redesigned Zip model range. These are sometimes referred to as the Zip 2000 or Zip Cat models. It had a height adjustable seat, lockable glove box and underseat storage with room for a full face helmet.

The base 50 cc version was once again a two-stroke but the engine was now the updated Hi-Per2 unit. The Zip SP had the water-cooled Hi-Per2 Pro engine and single sided front suspension. In the UK the 50 cc models were sold in restricted form to comply with moped licence regulations. The restriction was done by the use of a washer to prevent the variator from using its full range and a blank pipe from the exhaust to reduce power. The Zip model was the best selling powered two wheeled vehicle (by registrations) in the UK in 2001.

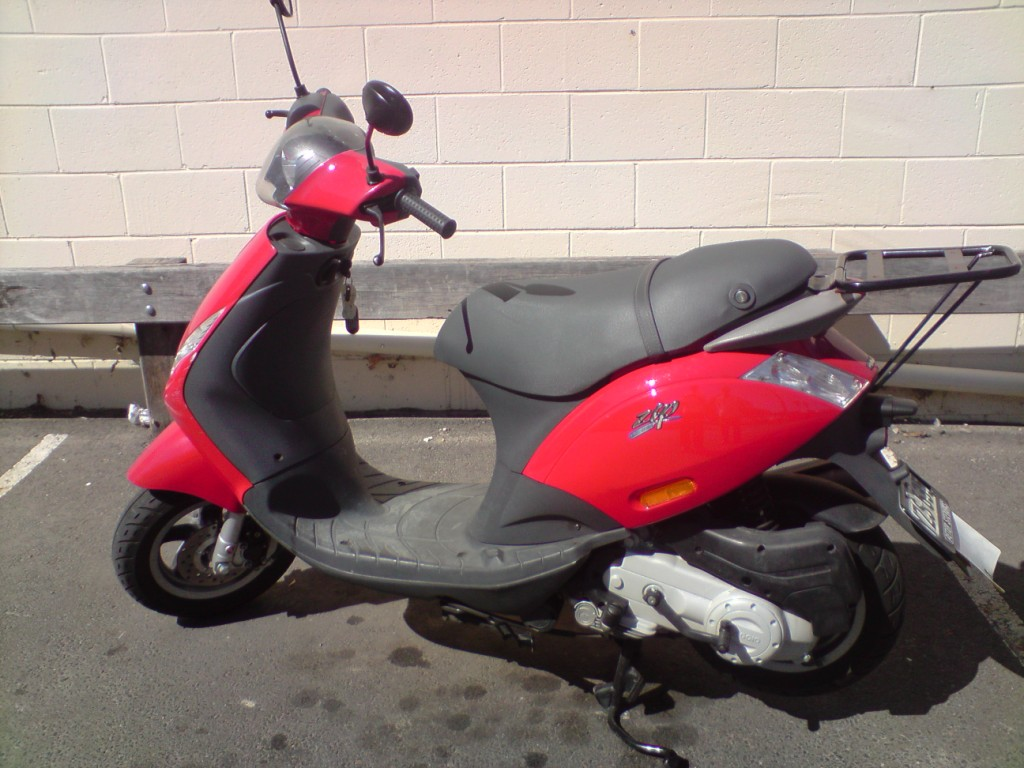
Piaggio Zip 4t in red

In addition to the two-stroke variants a four stroke 124 cc (7.6 cu in) model was also made available. The Zip 125 had an air-cooled two-valve variant of the Piaggio group's LEADER (Low Emissions ADvanced Engine Range) engine. The 125 model was also equipped with side lights.

In late 2005 a four stroke Hi-Per4 equipped 49 cc Zip 50 4t was announced. The 4t was restricted for some markets via electronics, a washer in the front transmission pulley and a smaller main jet.

A four-stroke Hi-Per4 100 cc (6.1 cu in) model, the Zip 100, was made available in March 2006 in some markets.

In November 2017 the “2018 Model Year” introduces the new Piaggio 50 I-Get air-cooled, three-valve, four-stroke, engine Euro 4 approved. The new range is composed by the "basic" Zip and sporty Zip S versions which differ in the bodywork colours In 2021 the I-Get engine has been re-homologated to Euro 5.

Production of the Zip ends in late 2024 due to the Euro 5+ anti-pollution regulations coming into effect in the European Union.

== Specifications ==
	Zip	Zip SP	Zip Cat/2t	Zip SP (2000)	Zip 4t	Zip 100	Zip 125
Year introduced	1995	1996	2000	2001	2005	2006	2001
Engine type	two-stroke				four-stroke		
Cooling type	air-cooled	water-cooled	air-cooled	water-cooled	air-cooled		
Engine family	Hi-PER 1/2	Hi-PER 2 Pro	Hi-PER 2	Hi-PER 2 Pro	Hi-PER 4	Hi-PER 4	LEADER
Emissions standard	Euro 1	Euro 1	Euro 2	Euro 2	Euro 2	Euro 3	Euro 3
Engine Capacity	49.4 cc (3.01 cu in)	49.4 cc (3.01 cu in)	49.4 cc (3.01 cu in)	49.4 cc (3.01 cu in)	49.9 cc (3.05 cu in)	96.2 cc (5.87 cu in)	124.02 cc (7.568 cu in) (7.57 cu in)
Bore x Stroke (mm)	40 mm × 39.3 mm (1.57 in × 1.55 in)	40 mm × 39.3 mm (1.57 in × 1.55 in)	40 mm × 39.3 mm (1.57 in × 1.55 in)	40 mm × 39.3 mm (1.57 in × 1.55 in)	39 mm × 41.8 mm (1.54 in × 1.65 in)	50 mm × 49 mm (2.0 in × 1.9 in)	57 mm × 48.6 mm (2.24 in × 1.91 in)
Transmission	Continuously variable transmission (CVT)						
Dry weight	71 kg (157 lb)	77 kg (170 lb)					95 kg (209 lb)
