= Piaggio MyMoover =

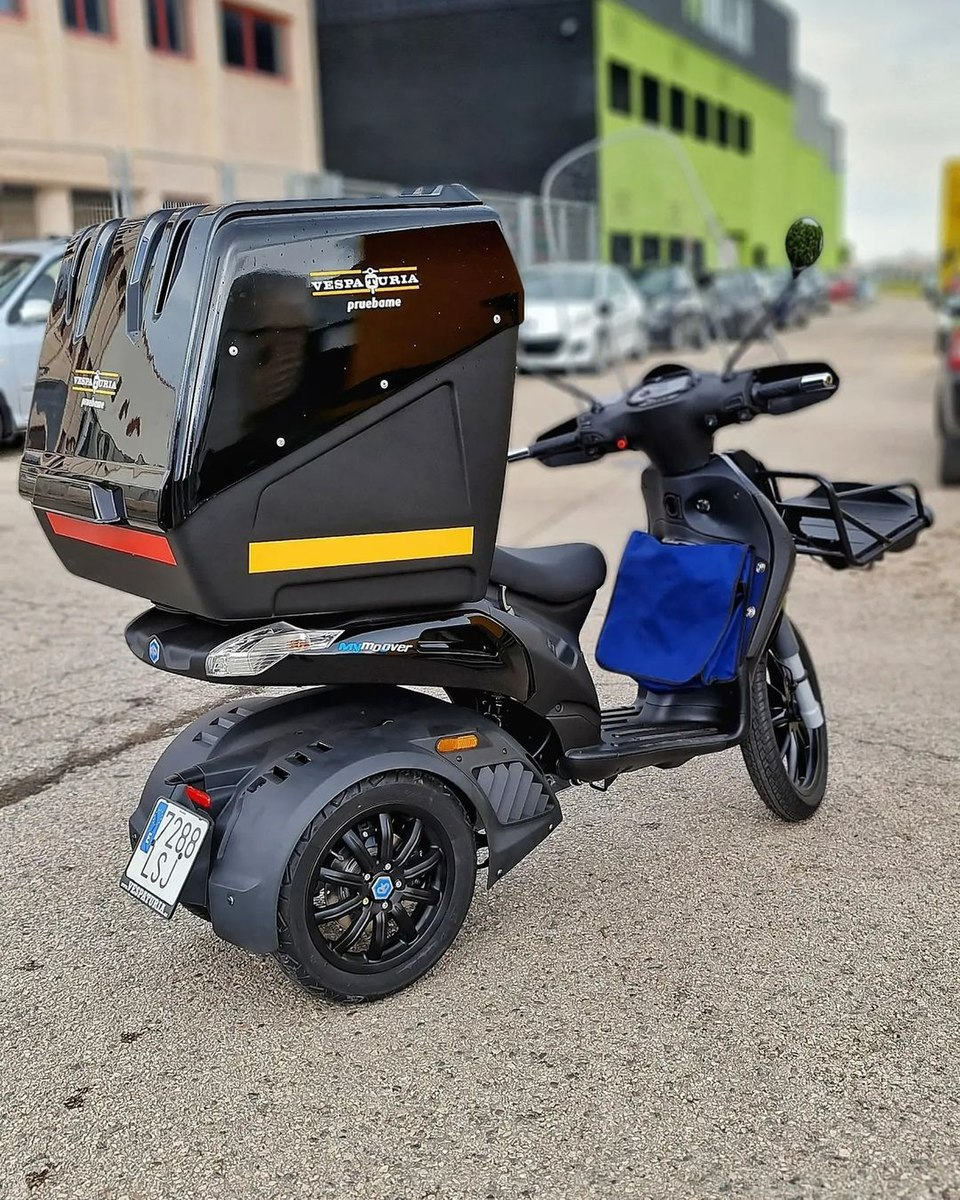
- Manufacturer: Piaggio
- Also called: Piaggio 3W-Delivery
- Production: 2020–present
- Assembly: Pontedera, Italy
- Class: Scooter
- Engine: 124.6 cm³ Piaggio i-Get four-stroke
- Top speed: 74 km/h
- Torque: 10.0 Nm at 5250 rpm
- Transmission: V-Belt Automatic (CVT)
- Brakes: Front: 240 mm disc Rear: 200 mm double disc
- Wheelbase: 1325 mm
- Dimensions: L: 2155 mm W: 795 mm
- Seat height: 760 mm
- Weight: 200 kg (440 lb)- (wet)
- Fuel capacity: 10

The Piaggio MyMoover is a tilting three-wheeled scooter produced by the Italian manufacturer Piaggio in Pontedera since 2020.

== Specification ==
The MyMoover is a three-wheeled "delivery" motorscooter with a large rear trunk intended for the urban delivery market. It was presented in the spring of 2020 with the provisional name Piaggio 3W-Delivery when the supply of a fleet of 5000 units to Poste Italiane and the following year it was also put up for sale to private customers.

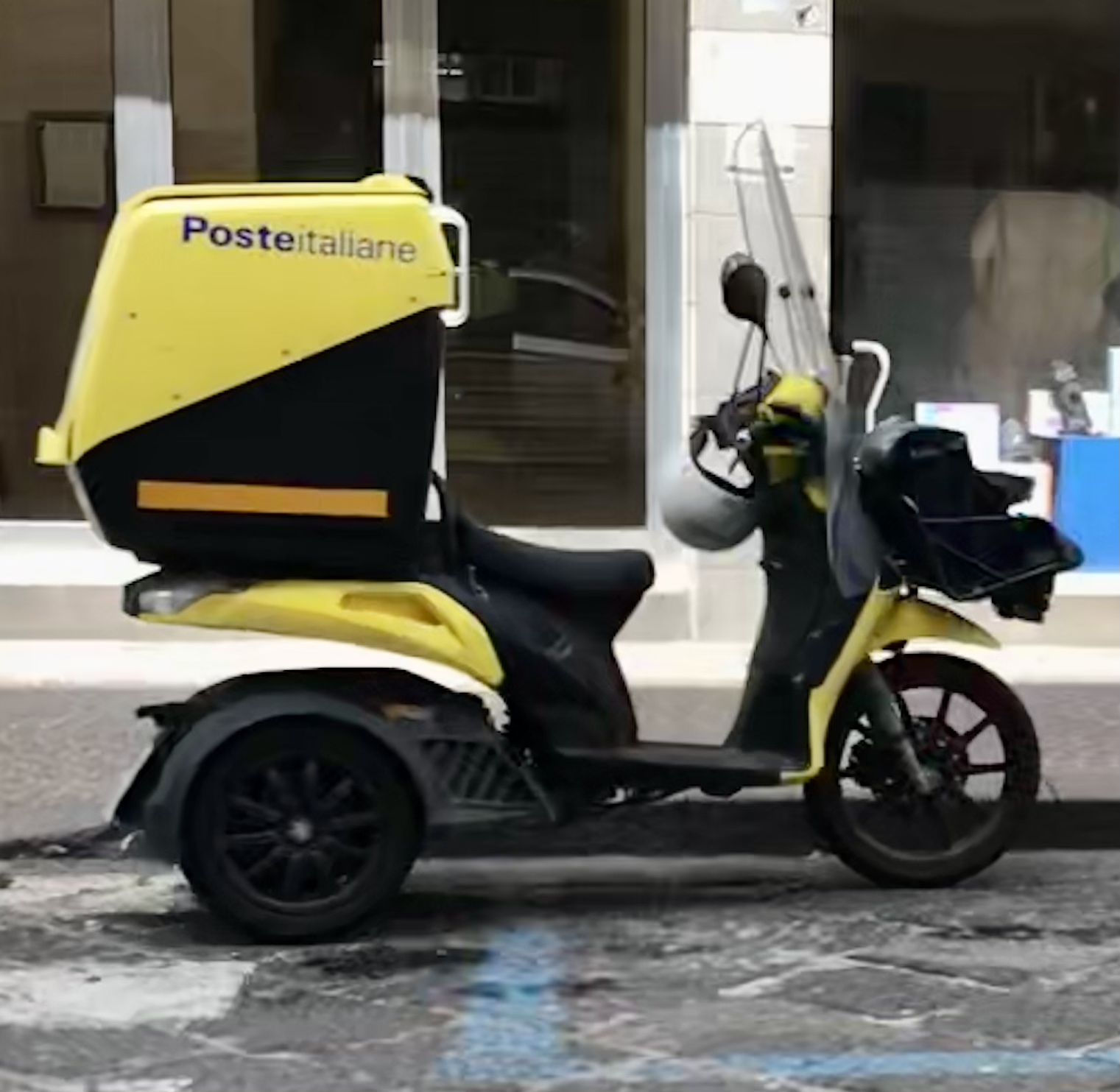
The MyMoover of the fleet Poste Italiane

The main feature is the new three-wheel tilting chassis, with two rear and one front all with disc brake and CBS combined braking. The tilting system allows an inclination of the vehicle up to 45 degrees. The vehicle does not have a stand but a lateral parking brake. The rear trunk has a load capacity of up to 60 kg and a total volume of 261 litres, a front plate with a load capacity of 20 kg and an optional central fabric bag with a capacity of 5 kg. As standard, it has a USB port and push-button opening of the rear trunk. For a fee, it has a black box with telematic services and GPS.

Aesthetically, the front part has the same shield as the Piaggio Liberty Delivery with the front luggage rack and a square light at the bottom, the rear part is specific due to the large trunk. The length is 2155 mm, the width 795 mm, the wheelbase measures 1325 mm. The saddle is single-seater and has a ground clearance of 760 mm.

The engine available is the 125 single-cylinder Piaggio “i-Get” four-stroke engine of 124.6 cc effective which delivers 8.0 kW (10.9 HP) at 8,750 rpm of maximum power and 10.0 Nm at 5,250 rpm of maximum torque. Liquid-cooled, the engine is combined with the CVT gearbox and is approved Euro 5. Average consumption in the approved WMTC cycle is 37 km/l. The declared emissions are equal to 67 g/km of carbon dioxide. The declared performances are: maximum speed equal to 74 km/h and maximum gradeability equal to 30%.

The frame uses a single cradle structure in high strength tubular steel with suspension front with fork hydraulic telescopic and rear suspension with hydraulic monoshock absorber. The front wheel measures 90/80 R16, the two rear wheels measure 90/90 R12. The braking system uses a 240 mm front disc and a double 200 mm rear disc, combined CBS braking as standard. The tank has a capacity of 10 litres. The curb weight is 200 kg.
