= Piaggio Liberty =

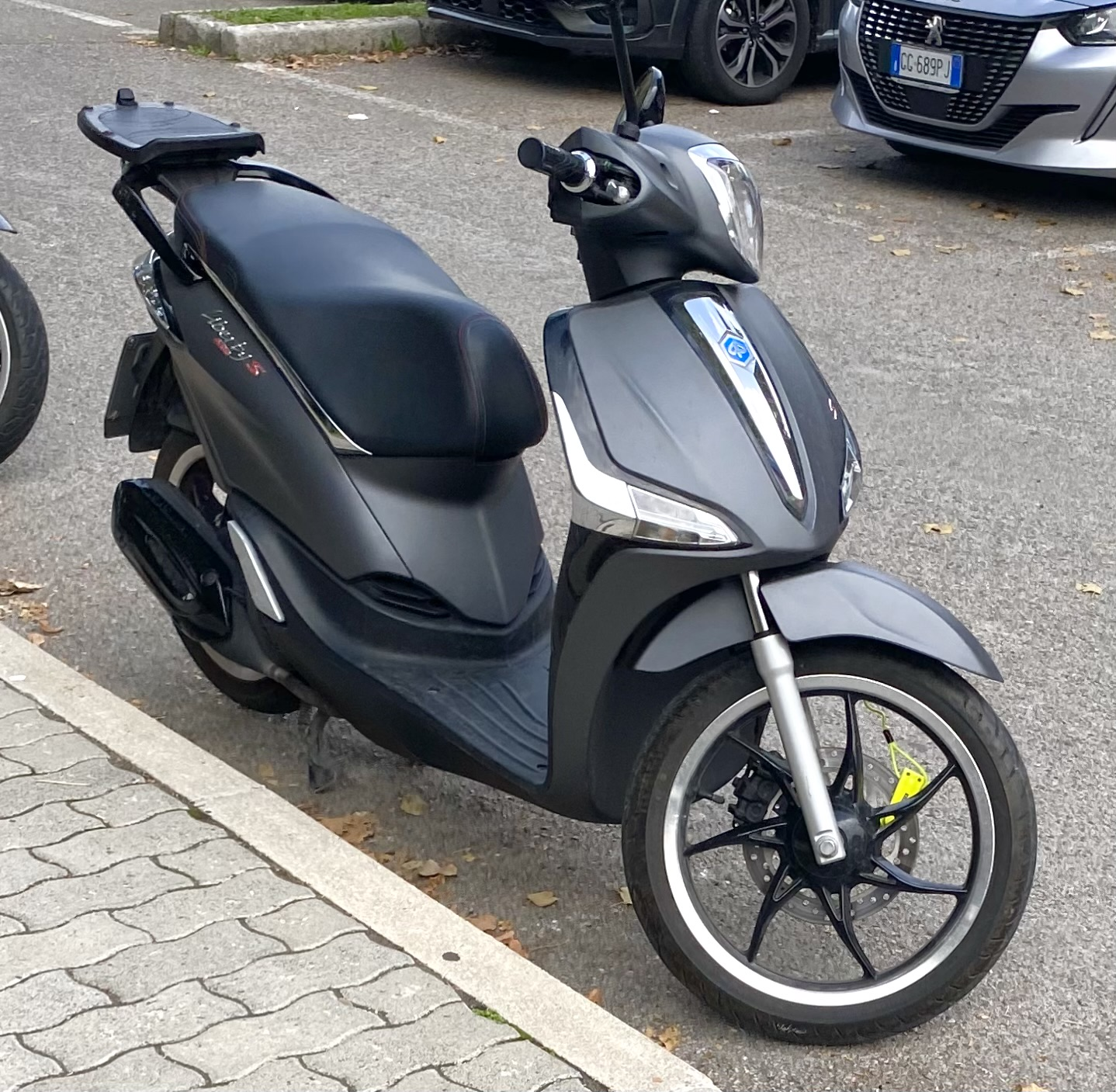
- 2023 Piaggio Liberty S
- Manufacturer: Piaggio
- Also called: Derbi Sonar
- Production: 1997–present
- Assembly: Pontedera, Italy; Vĩnh Phúc, Vietnam
- Predecessor: Piaggio Free
- Class: Scooter
- Engine: 50 cc (3.1 cu in); 100 cc (6.1 cu in); 125 cc (7.6 cu in); 150 cc (9.2 cu in)
- Ignition type: Capacitor discharge electronic ignition (CDI)
- Transmission: CVT automatic; gear final drive
- Frame type: Tubular steel spine
- Brakes: Front; disc Rear; expanding drum

The Piaggio Liberty is a two-wheeled scooter from the Italian manufacturer Piaggio.

The first Liberty was built in 1997, after which it was restyled in 2004 and then again in 2009. It is a popular scooter among couriers and postal delivery companies around Central Europe.

== History ==
=== First series (1997–2004) ===
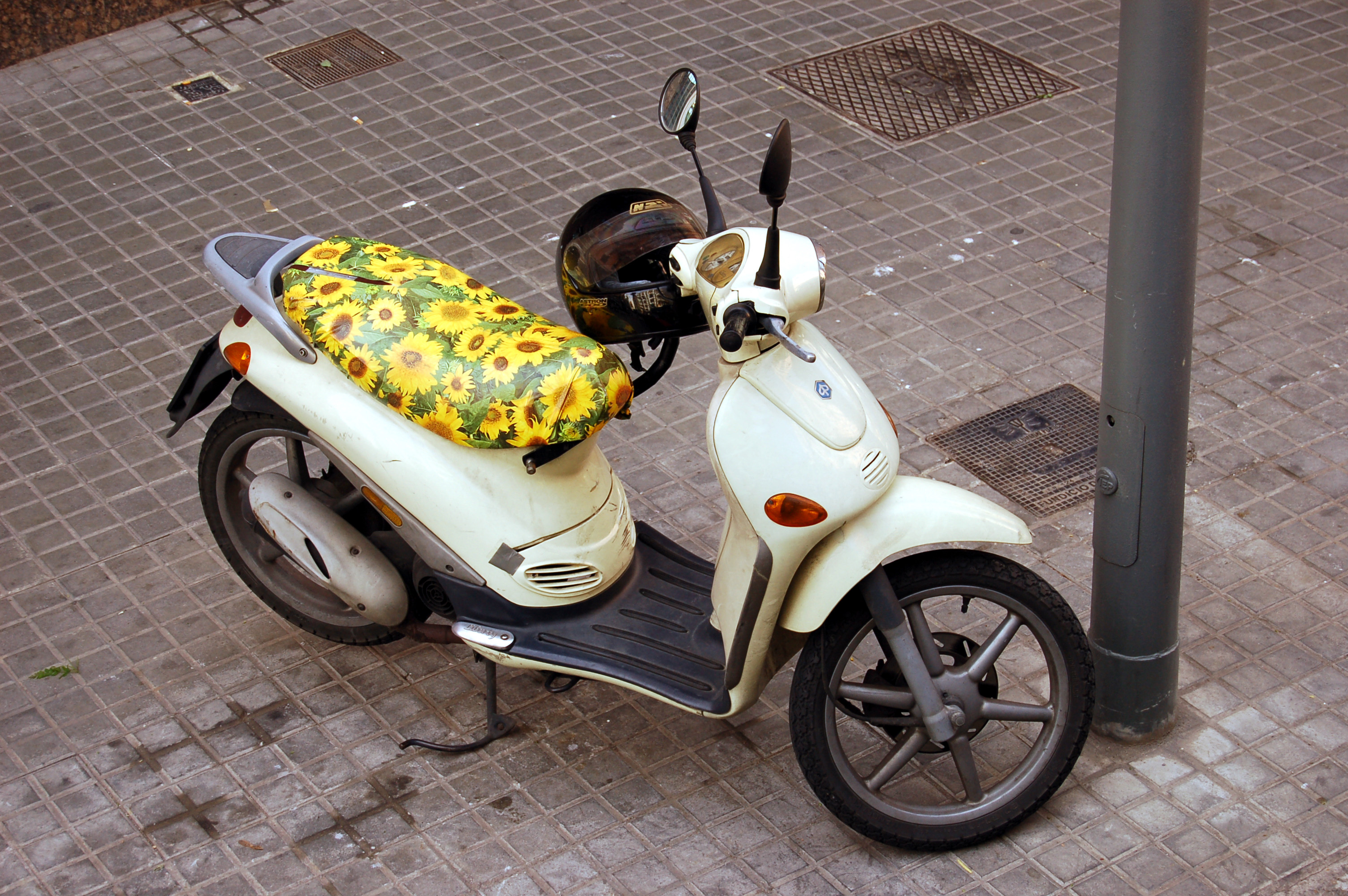
2001 Piaggio Liberty first series

Presented at the Barcelona motor show in May 1997, the Liberty was born as a scooter with a 50 cm^{3} engine intended primarily for young audiences, having highly innovative specifications, it immediately stands out as "high wheels" among the most popular on the market; thanks to its original and dynamic line, good design quality and competitive price.

In September of the same year, the version with a 125 four-stroke engine was presented at the Milan show and went on sale a few months later.

In 1999 the Liberty LE 150 was introduced with the 150 cm^{3} four-stroke engine equipped with catalyst approved Euro 1 followed in December of the same year also by the 50 LE and 125 LE models approved Euro 1.

=== Second series (2004–2009) ===
In the first months of 2004 the Liberty underwent a profound restyling both in terms of aesthetics and mechanics: a novelty is the departure of the 150 cm^{3} engine replaced by the new 200 cm^{3} four-stroke.

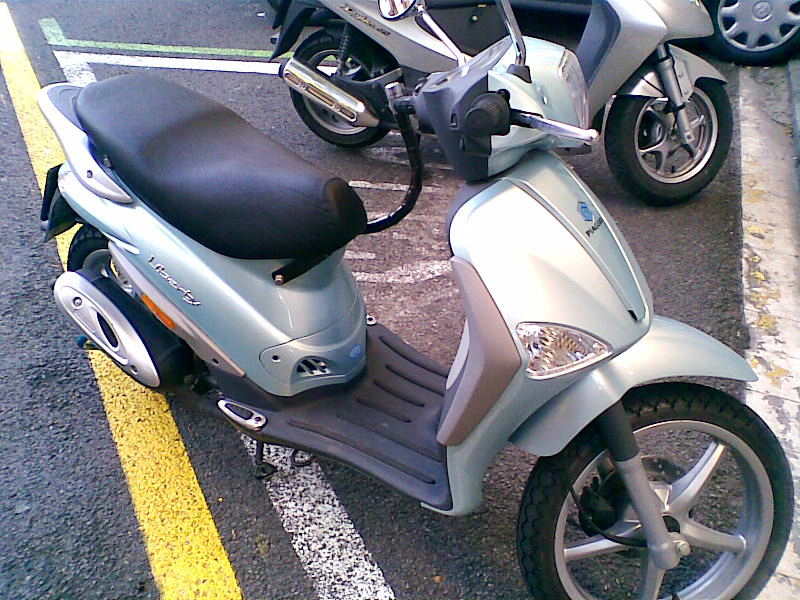
Second series Liberty

The basic model with a displacement of 50 cm^{3} was proposed both in version with two-stroke engine and with four-stroke engine. The higher displacements are instead exclusively four strokes.

From the middle of the year 2006 the sports version, the Liberty S, came on the market, characterized by a fairing similar to the Beverly 125 and an unprecedented instrumentation. It was slightly updated further in 2007 by re-proposing the 150 engine instead of the 200 cm^{3}. A peculiar trait, in its category, is the attention to detail and the evident search to present captivating and well-finished finishes together with original saddle fabrics.

The Liberty Delivery 125 cm^{3} version was also chosen by Poste Italiane as a scooter for the distribution of correspondence. As same to Austria and Hungary.

The Liberty has a single cylinder engine air-cooled for all versions, "LEADER" for 125 and 150 cm^{3} and "HI-PER" for 50 cm^{3}.

The presence of high wheels limits the capacity of the compartment under the saddle that it can contain various objects and just a jet helmet; on the other hand, the large tank guarantees good autonomy.

=== Third series (2009–2013) ===
In 2009 the third series of the Liberty was presented, available in the displacements 50 cm^{3}, engine to choose between two-stroke and four-stroke, 125 cm^{3} and 150 cm^{3}. New features are a 10 mm lower seat, 10-spoke alloy wheels and a new 240 mm front disc brake. The design are more captivating, the rear part in particular has been completely modernized, adopting more angular lines for the headlight and the arrows.

In November 2009 the limited edition Liberty Elle was presented, created together with the Elle magazine and intended for women. This model has a pink body with matching top case, 50 four-stroke or 125 four-stroke engine and seat lowered by 20 millimeters. It has been on sale since March 2010.

The Liberty Teens, a special edition with two-tone pearl white/denim blue bodywork, and an electric prototype based on the Liberty Delivery for commercial fleets are presented at EICMA 2010. The Teens special model will go on sale in May 2011 with a 50 two-stroke engine only.

On 1 March 2012, production also starts in Vietnam for the Asian market.

=== Fourth series (2013–2016) ===
In July 2013, the fourth series was presented, the range of which is divided into 50 models (two and four-stroke) and the brand new Liberty 3V from 125 and 150 cm^{3} (four-stroke). Aesthetically, the models are identical but the Liberty 3V 125 and 150 have a different and unprecedented chassis.

The fourth series is characterized by the new front shield with the "tie" grille that houses the Piaggio logo, the new front direction indicators with a more pointed "arrow" design are also introduced. The headlight is now triangular in shape. The new chrome inserts positioned on the fenders make their debut on the side, a chrome band is also mounted and on the front glove box. The saddle is new and has better padding, the underseat compartment is enlarged by 23% up to a volume of 10.8 liters, the battery is moved behind the front storage compartment.

The fourth series maintains the same chassis as the previous one but in the models with the 50 engine it has a length of 1,935 mm, a width of 760 mm and a wheelbase of 1,320 mm. The front wheel of the fifties is 16" with a 90/80 tire, the rear is 14" with a 110/80 tire. The seat of the 50 is 785 mm high and the tank has a capacity of 6 liters.

The 3V models (with 125 and 150 cm^{3} engine) have a length reduced to 1,920 mm, a width of 700 mm with a wheelbase increased to 1,345 mm. The front wheel of the 3Vs now has a 15" diameter (on the third series they were 16") and is fitted with a narrower but wider shoulder tire (80/90). The rear wheel is always 14" with a 100/80 tire. The seat of the 3V is 790 mm high and the tank has a capacity of 6.5 liters.

The braking system is the same on all models and consists of a 240 mm front disc with double piston caliper while at the rear it adopts a 140 mm drum.

=== Fifth series (from 2016) ===
The fifth series debuts at EICMA 2015 and enters production in early 2016. A novelty is the departure of the 50 two-stroke engine, the range is now composed of 50, 125 and 150 engines all belonging to the "I-Get" family Euro 4 approved four-stroke and three valves.

It remains faithful in design to the previous generation by introducing only minor aesthetic updates such as a new front shield with more rounded and streamlined profiles with the larger headlights that on the 125 and 150 models have LED position lights. The chassis, on the other hand, is totally new and all versions use the same wheels and tires (with no differences between the various displacements). The newly designed frame has a torsional stiffness increased by + 15% while the flexural stiffness has been increased by + 17%, the front hydraulic fork has an excursion of 76 mm, while at the rear there is a shock absorber with a 73.5 mm stroke on the 50 while on the top of the range 125 and 150 there is a hydraulic shock absorber with adjustable preload on 5 positions and stroke of 74.5 mm.

The compartment under the saddle is enlarged up to 17 liters, while the compartment in the front shield now has a capacity of 4 liters and also has a USB input and Piaggio Multimedia Platform system that allows you to connect the vehicle with your smartphone. The front wheel for all models is 16 "with a 90/80 tire, the rear 14" with a 100/80 tire. The braking system consists of a 240mm front disc and 140mm rear drum. The 125 and 150 have front wheel ABS as standard. The dimensions are: length equal to 1945 mm, width 690 mm, wheelbase of 1370 mm, saddle height equal to 780 mm (on the fifties) and 787 mm (on the 125/150). The tank on all models has a capacity of 6 liters (including 1.5 liters of reserve).

In 2021 the engine range is re-approved Euro 5. In March 2022 the special version Liberty Baci Perugina was introduced, created in collaboration with Perugina to celebrate the centenary of the chocolate Bacio.
