= Piaggio X10 =

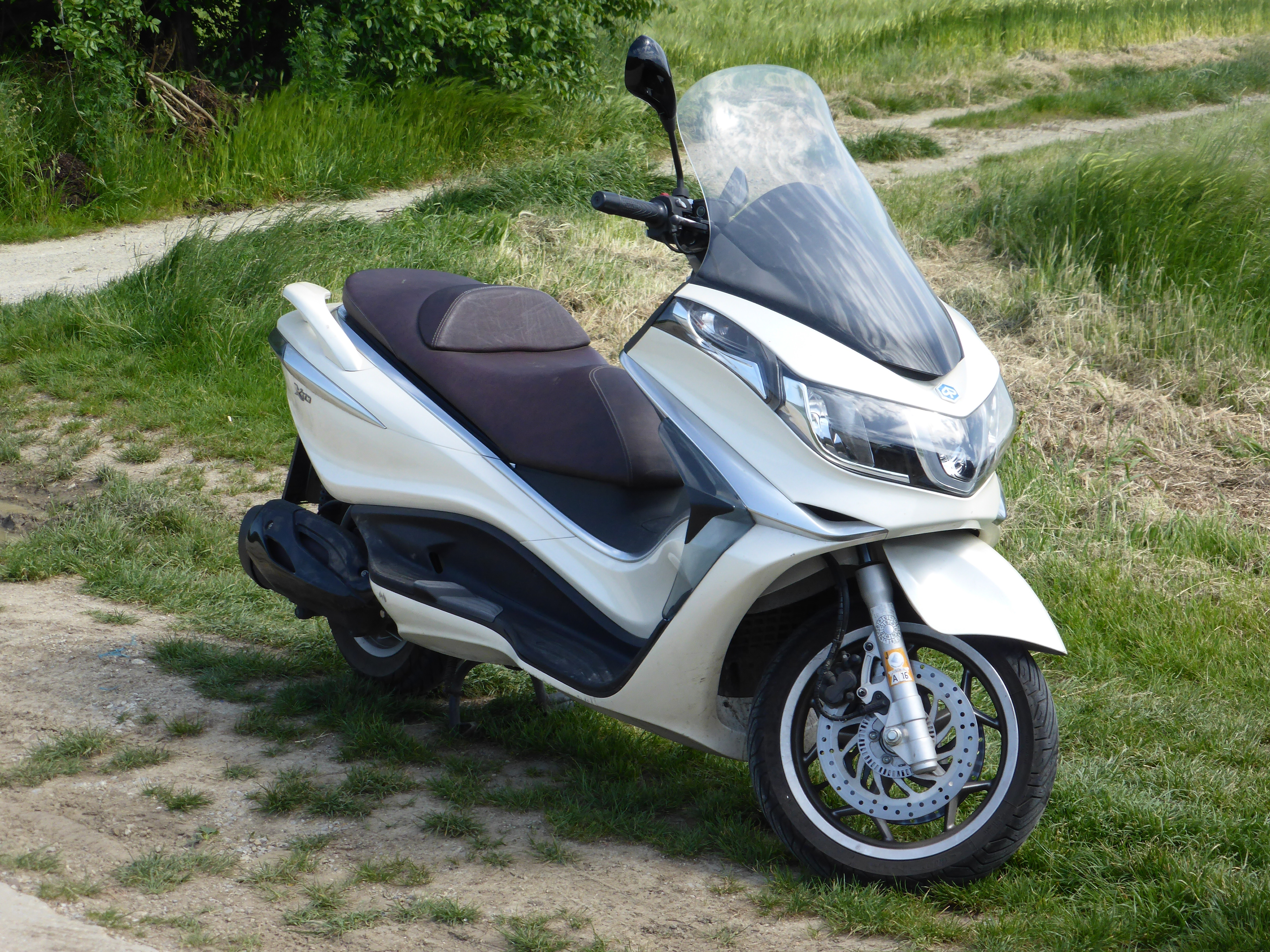
- Manufacturer: Piaggio
- Production: 2011-2017
- Class: scooter
- Engine: Liquid-cooled single-cylinder engine 400: 399 cc (24.3 cu in); 350: 349 cc (21.3 cu in) 125: 124 cc (7.6 cu in)
- Transmission: CVT
- Suspension: Front: Telescopic fork Rear: Twin-shock with preload adjustment
- Related: Piaggio X8

The Piaggio X10 is a scooter produced by the Italian motorcycle manufacturer Piaggio from the end of 2011 to 2017 in the Pontedera plant.

== Description ==
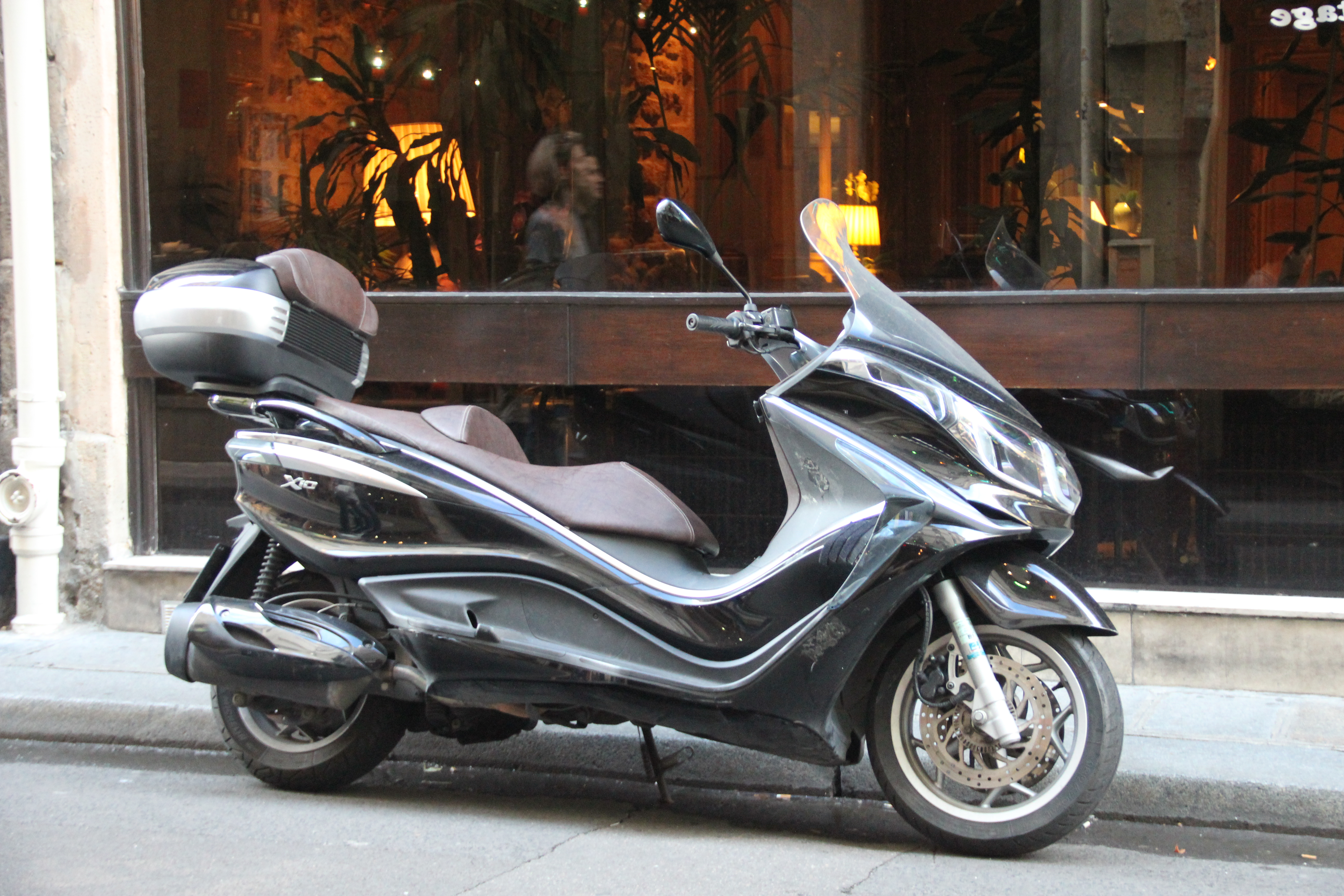

Previewed at the EICMA in Milan in November 2011 with three single-cylinder four-stroke engines of 125, 350 and 500 cm^{3}.

The 350 cm^{3} models have the Piaggio Multimedia Platform (PMP) system, through which it is possible to check data on engine speed, odometer, average and maximum speed, fuel consumption and other scooter parameters via Bluetooth with a smartphone. Furthermore, sensors such as the gyroscope of the smartphone can also be used to measure and record the acceleration forces or the lean angle of the scooter as if it were telemetry.

All models are equipped with a single-cylinder four-stroke engine with four-valve overhead camshaft distribution and liquid cooling with indirect electronic injection in the intake manifold and approved according to Euro 3 standards, combined with a continuously variable automatic transmission.

Production ended at the beginning of 2017 with the simultaneous entry into force of the Euro 4 anti-pollution regulations. The Piaggio X10 is now regarded as one of the most futuristic scooters of its time.
