= Piaggio Free =

Italian motorcycle

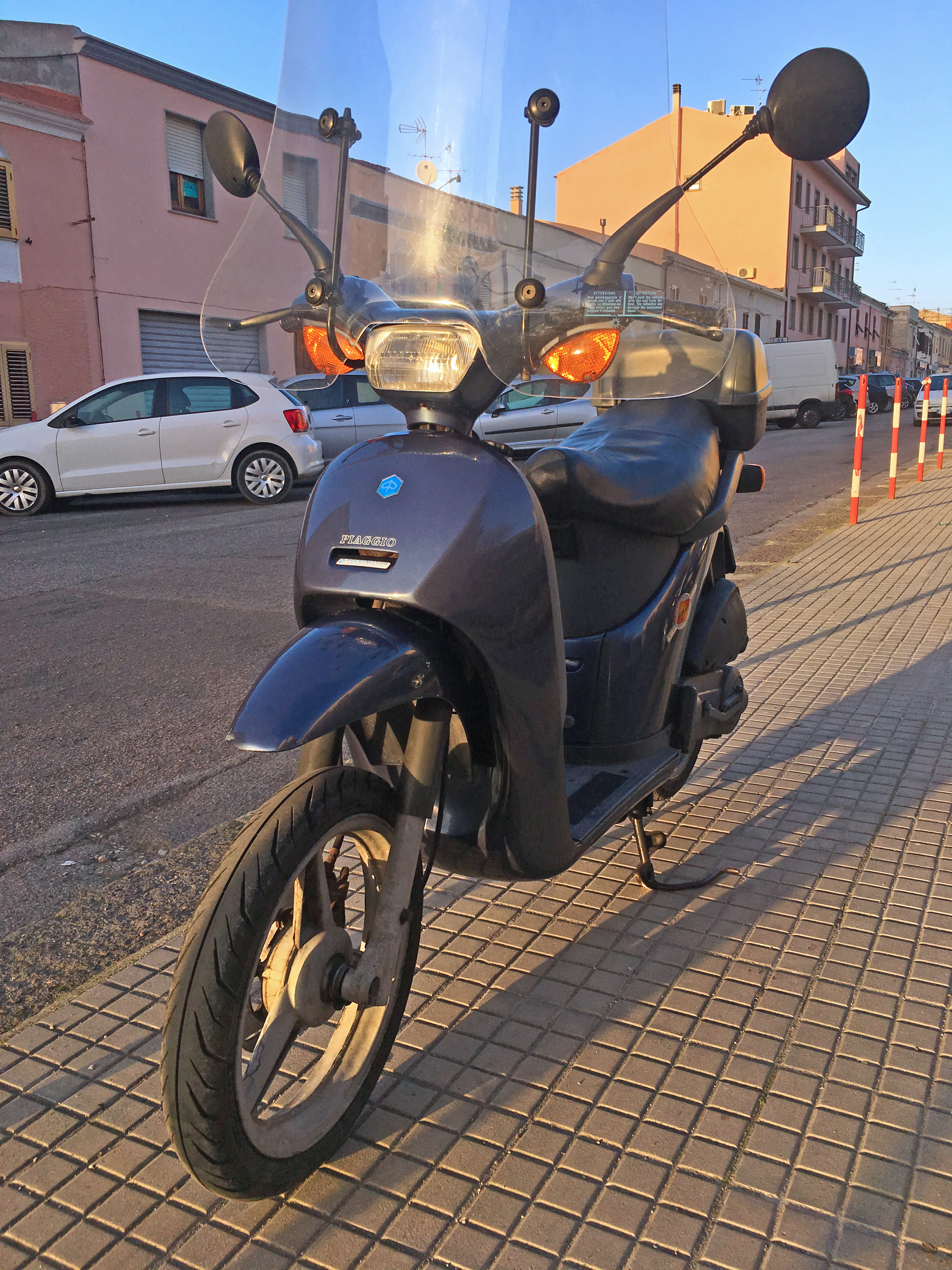
- Manufacturer: Piaggio
- Production: 1992–2002
- Assembly: Pontedera, Italy; Arganda del Rey, Spain
- Successor: Piaggio Liberty
- Class: Scooter
- Engine: 49.4 cc (3.01 cu in); 96.2 cc (5.87 cu in)
- Power: 4.6 HP (50); 7.6 HP (100)
- Ignition type: Capacitor discharge electronic ignition (CDI)
- Transmission: CVT automatic; gear final drive
- Frame type: Tubular steel spine
- Brakes: Front; drum (1992–1999) disc (1999–2002); Rear; drum
- Wheelbase: 1255
- Dimensions: L: 1820 mm W: 665 mm
- Seat height: 810 mm
- Weight: 69 kg (50); 91 kg (100) (dry)

The Piaggio Free is a scooter produced by italian motorcycle manufacturer Piaggio from 1992 to 2002 in Pontedera.

== History ==
The Piaggio Free was introduced in the end of 1992 and was Piaggio's first modern scooter defined as "high wheels". It was only available with a two-stroke 50 engine delivering 4.6 HP and was positioned as the least expensive scooter model within the 1990s Piaggio range, slightly more expensive than the Ciao and Si mopeds.

The braking system consisted of a front drum with a diameter of 104 mm and a rear drum with a diameter of 100 mm. The weight was 69 kg.

In 1999 the Free Catalyzed was introduced with the 50 two-stroke engine which was updated by adopting the catalyst and Euro 1 homologation, new 14-inch tires were introduced and the new braking system consisting of a 200 mm front disc with hydraulic control and 110 mm diameter rear drum.

In 2002 the air-cooled 100cc four-stroke "HI-PER" engine was introduced, delivering 7.6 horsepower and Euro 1 approved. The latter model was aesthetically identical to the 50 except for the specially designed 14-inch wheels (with more spokes) and the wider tires. The Free 100 has a weight of 92 kg.

The production of the Free ends at the end of 2002 as sales had now rather reduced due to internal competition with the Liberty model, more refined and better equipped.
