= Piaggio X7 =

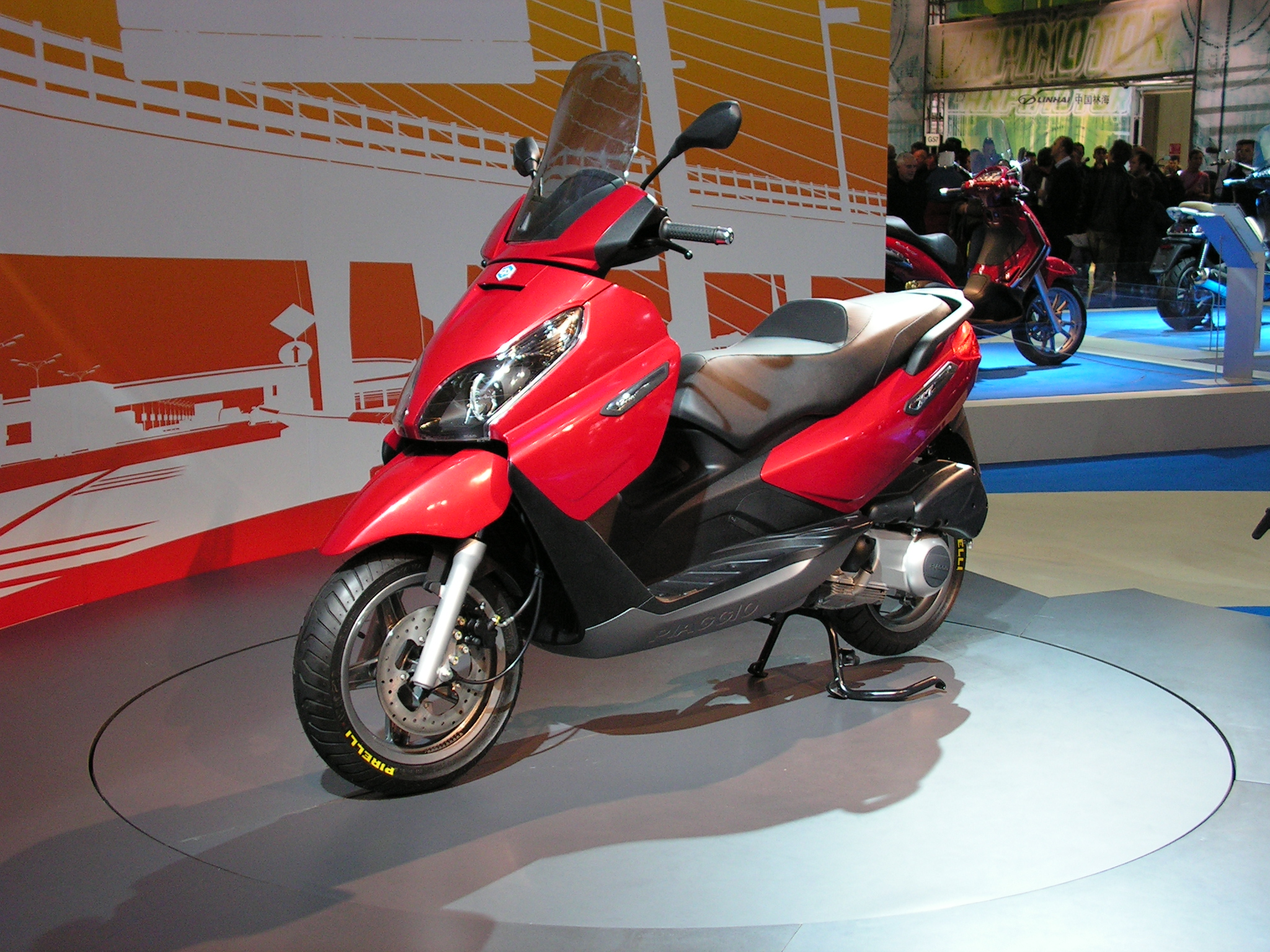
- Manufacturer: Piaggio
- Parent company: Piaggio
- Production: 2007–2012 (Europe); 2021–present (China)
- Assembly: Pontedera, Italy; Foshan, China
- Successor: Piaggio Xevo
- Class: Scooter

The Piaggio X7 is a scooter model produced by the Italian motorcycle manufacturer Piaggio.

== European version ==
The X7 was produced between 2007 and 2012 with water-cooled engines with 125 cm^{3}, 250 cm^{3}, 300 cm^{3} and 400 cm^{3} displacement. It has large wheels, a comfortable chassis, a comfortable bench and plenty of storage space; A full-face helmet and a jet helmet fit in the helmet compartment.

The engines used were the types L.E.A.D.E.R and QUASAR – both in the carburettor version and as an injector (model suffix "i.e."). Both engines support the Euro 3 standard.

=== X7 Evo ===
Due to the low sales found by the X7 a little more than a year and a half after marketing, Piaggio presents the X7 Evo on June 23, 2009, which represents an improved restyled version: the front light unit changes and conforms to the style of the remaining "X" range while the chassis and mechanical characteristics remain the same except for the top-of-the-range engine: the 250 is replaced by the new 300 Quasar with four valves and electronic injection which delivers 16.4 kW (22.4 HP) and a maximum torque of 23.8 Nm. The base engine remains the old 125.

== Chinese version ==
In March 2021 Piaggio present in China a new version of the X7 produced locally by the Zongshen Piaggio joint venture; this model is a re-engineered version of the old European X7 according to Chinese specifications and intended solely for the internal market. Aesthetically it is a restyling of the X7 Evo with full front LED headlight while the components are different starting from the 244 cm^{3} engine that delivers 15.6 kW (21.2 horsepower) at 6500 rpm (the same of the Aprilia SR Max 250). The wheelbase is 1480 mm, while the wheels maintain the diameters of 14′ front and 13′ rear with Zhengxin tires, fork with 35 mm stanchions and KYB shock absorbers. It features standard ABS, traction control and combined braking, with 260 mm front disc and four-piston caliper. The weight of the Chinese X7 is 182 kg.
