= Rinaldo Piaggio =

Italian entrepreneur and senator

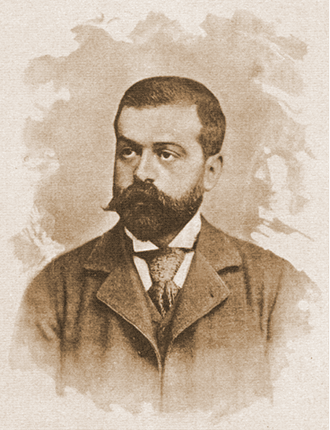
Rinaldo Piaggio

Rinaldo Piaggio (1864–1938) was an Italian entrepreneur, senator, and founder of Piaggio.

== Career ==
He founded Piaggio in 1884. It originally made furniture, then switched to aviation, building the Piaggio P.108 bomber. He was elected to the position of Senator of the Kingdom of Italy in 1934. He died at the age of 71.
