= Piaggio NRG =

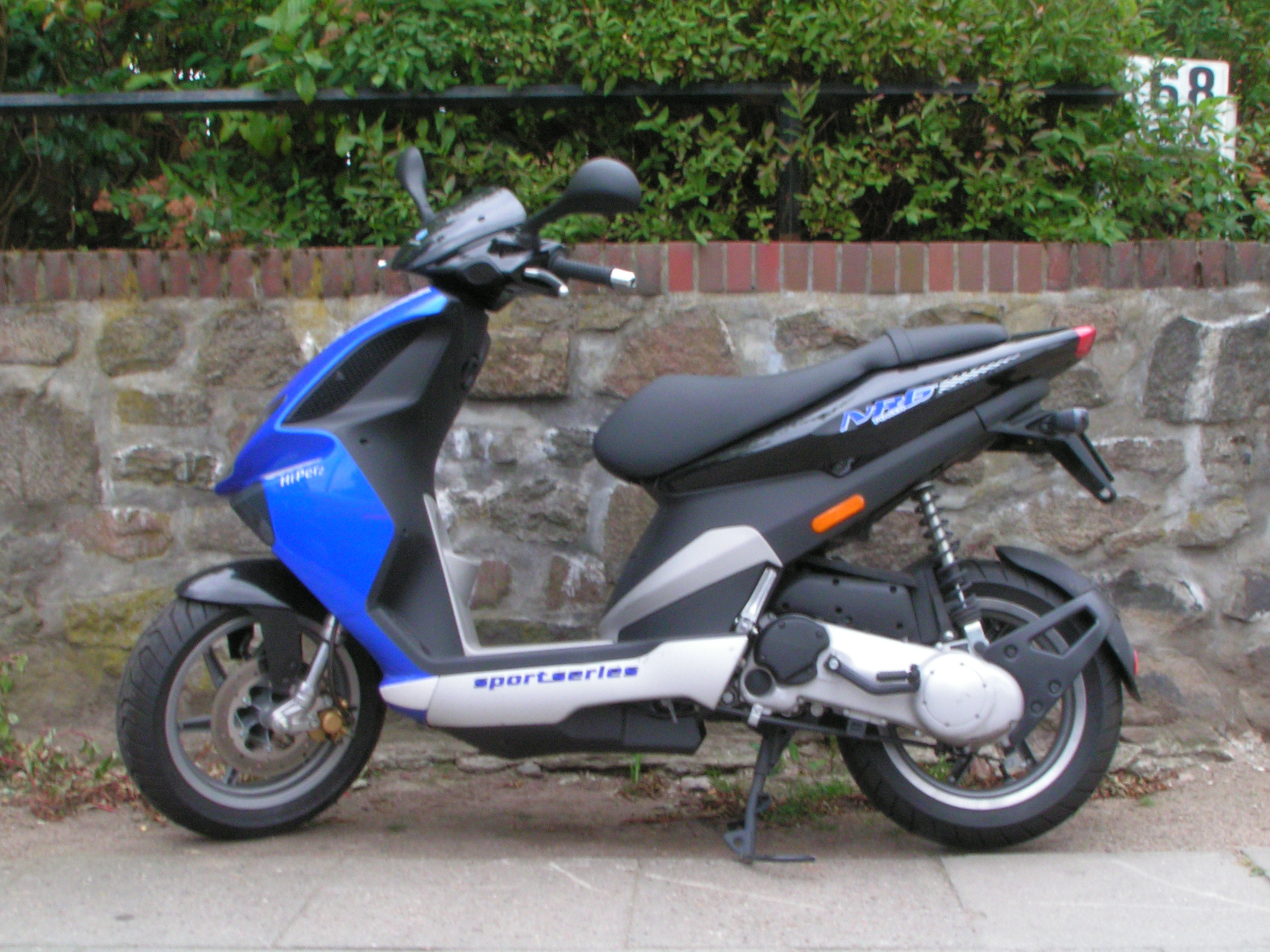
- Manufacturer: Piaggio
- Production: 1994–2020
- Assembly: Pontedera, Italy
- Predecessor: Piaggio Quartz
- Class: Scooter
- Engine: 49 cc (3.0 cu in) two stroke, single, air- or liquid-cooled with a Dell'Orto or Weber carburetor or direct fuel injection (mc3 PureJet, NRG Power PureJet)
- Bore / stroke: 40.0 mm × 39.3 mm (1.57 in × 1.55 in)
- Ignition type: Capacitor discharge electronic ignition (CDI)
- Transmission: Continuously variable automatic transmission (CVT)
- Suspension: Front: Upside down telescopic Rear: Swingarm, single shock absorber
- Brakes: Front: Single disc Rear: Drum or single disc
- Tyres: Front: 130/60-13 (120/70-13 for NRG Power); Rear: 130/60-13 (140/60-13 for NRG Power)
- Wheelbase: 1.280 m (4 ft 2.4 in)
- Weight: 94 kg (207 lb) (dry)
- Fuel capacity: 5.5 L (1.2 imp gal; 1.5 US gal); 6.7 L (1.5 imp gal; 1.8 US gal) (NRG Power)
- Oil capacity: 1.3 L (0.29 imp gal; 0.34 US gal)
- Related: Piaggio NTT; Piaggio Typhoon; Gilera Typhoon; Gilera Storm

The Piaggio NRG is a scooter made by Piaggio from 1994 to 2020. The name NRG is an acronym for eNeRGy .

== History ==
The first model (mc1) used a liquid-cooled, two-stroke engine. The mc2 differed from the mc1 only visually and later models (since 1998) had optional air-cooling and rear disc brakes (the Hi-Per2 engine). The mc3 saw not only further visual improvements, but also a rev counter, the new Hi-Per 2 engine, air-cooling (optional), rear disc brakes (optional) and direct fuel injection (optional). The NRG Power (introduced in 2005) changed drastically from the fairly similar three previous models. The NRG Power and mc3 were supplied in three versions:

- NRG Power DT / NRG mc3 DT (air-cooled, rear drum brakes)
- NRG Power DD / NRG mc3 DD (liquid-cooled, rear disc brakes. DD stands for "Double Disc")
- NRG Power PureJet / NRG mc3 PureJet (direct fuel injection)

Piaggio and Gilera have produced models similar to the mc1:

- NTT (10 inch rims and a front splitter)
- Piaggio Typhoon / Gilera Typhoon (10 inch rims, different front body, air cooling)
- Piaggio Storm / Gilera Storm (13 inch rims, Typhoon front body, air cooling)

== Models ==
- Piaggio NRG mc1 (1994–1996)
- Piaggio NRG mc2 (1996–1998)
- Piaggio NRG mc2 DD / mc2 extreme (1998–2000)
- Piaggio NRG mc3 DD / DT / PureJet
- Piaggio NRG Power DD / DT / PureJet (since 2005)
- Piaggio NRG mc4
