= Piaggio Beverly =

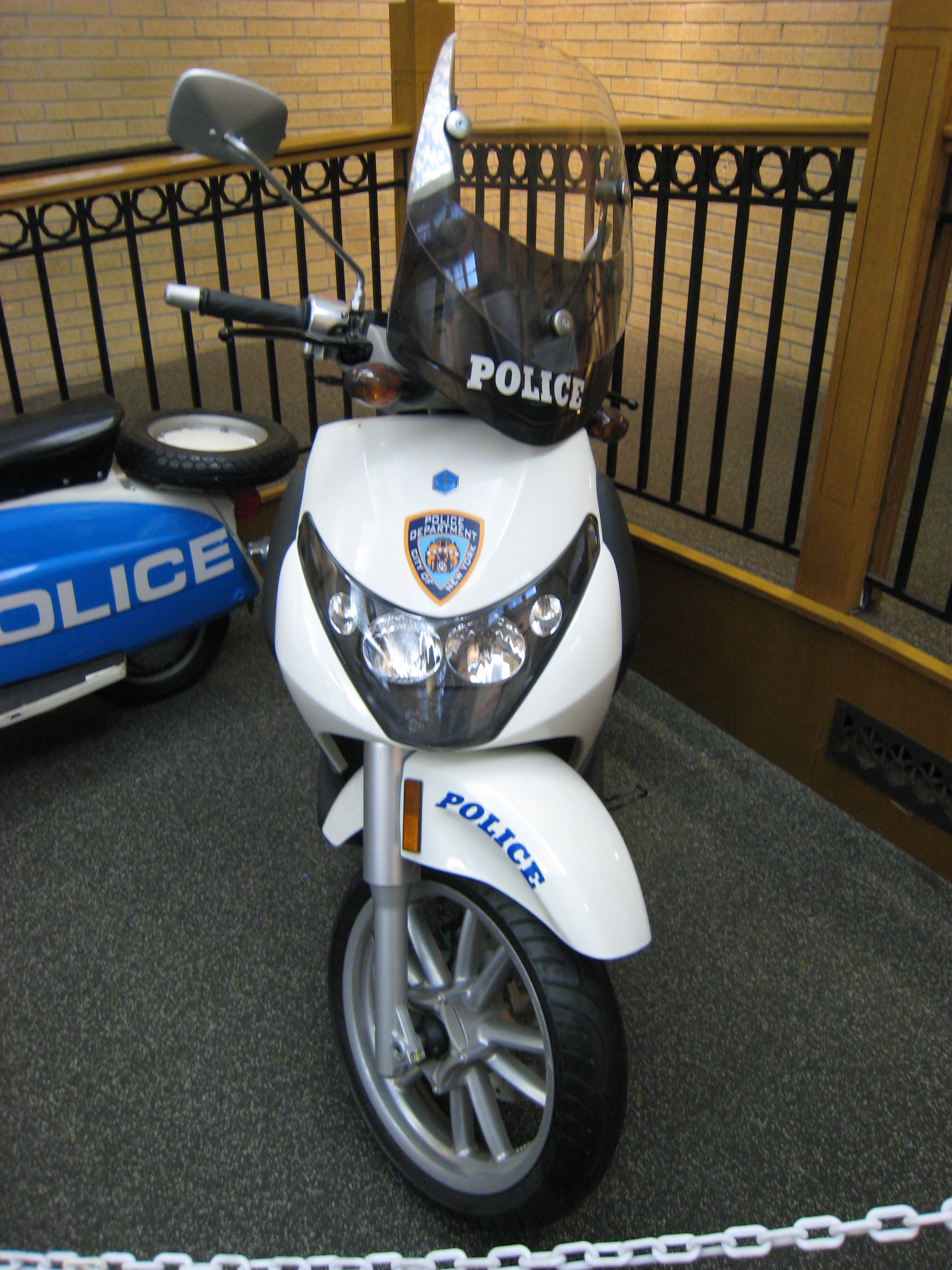
- Piaggio Beverly at the NYPD museum.
- Manufacturer: Piaggio
- Production: 2001–present
- Assembly: Pontedera, Italy
- Class: Scooter

The Piaggio Beverly is a scooter produced by the Italian vehicle manufacturer Piaggio.

== Model history ==
Introduced in 2001, the Piaggio Beverly has been produced in engine sizes ranging from 125 to 500 cc. Early models were powered by Piaggio's water-cooled L.E.A.D.E.R. engine.

In 2005 models with 250 cm^{3} and 500 cm^{3} displacement were also presented and the engine range was subsequently expanded to 300 cm^{3}, 350 cm^{3} and 400 cm^{3} displacement.

From 2006, all models have electronic injection (i.e.), no more carburetor. It comes in models Beverly and Beverly S.

The body was redesigned in 2004 and again in 2009. The Beverly is now available either as a Tourer or a Cruiser.

It also uses LED lighting and turn signals. The storage compartment underneath the seat holds two open helmets, and higher-powered models come standard with ABS.

== Changing the master cylinder ==
Since 2013, Piaggio has prescribed the change of the brakes master cylinder every 15,000 km on the Beverly 350. Due to the higher brake pressures in ABS brakes and the associated increased load on the installed cuffs, it is currently required in this system, these components regularly check, or replace, let, it is argued. The replacement of the master cylinder costs about 500 euros.

With the 2014 model year, the obligatory change of the master cylinder has been omitted.

== New Beverly (2021–present) ==
The latest Piaggio Beverly still retains continuity with older models in its design while outperforming them with its upgrades.

Take a new Euro 5 compliant 300 or 400 cc HPE (High Performance Engine). Engine is single cylinder four-stroke, 4-valve, liquid-cooled with electronic injection delivers reduced noise and fuel consumption.

The Piaggio claims that 300 cc HPE, has 23% more power and 16% extra torque over the previous model, and 400 cc HPE 17% more power and 30% extra torque than the previous 350 cc version, that delivers over 35 horsepower and is Euro 5 compliant.

The new “navigation bridge” houses a digital 5.5” LCD instrument panel in the centre, with ergonomically designed commands placed on each side of the handlebar.

All lights and indicators use LED technology, except for the under seat cargo area lamp.

Piaggio provides trio colour schemes – glossy Bianco Luna (white), Blu Oxygen (metallic blue) and Grigio Cloud (metallic grey).

== Specification ==
	125	200	250	250 i.e.	300 i.e. Tourer	400 i.e.	500 i.e.
Engine							
Engine Type	124 cc single-cylinder, four-stroke	198 cc single-cylinder, four-stroke	244.29 cc single-cylinder, four-stroke		278 cc single-cylinder, four-stroke	399 cc single-cylinder, four-stroke	460 cc single-cylinder, four-stroke
Bore/Stroke	57.0 x 48.6 mm	72.0 x 48.6 mm	72 x 60 mm		75 x 63 mm	85.8 x 69 mm	92 x 69 mm
Compression Ratio	12:1 (±0.5)		11:1 (±0.5)			10.6:1 (±0.5)	10.5:1
Fuel system	KEIHIN CVEK 30 carburetor and electrical fuel pump	Walbro WVF-7H	KEIHIN CVEK 30 carburetor/Walbro WVF-7S with vacuum pump	Throttle valve Ø 32 mm and single injector	Electronic injection with electric fuel pump, Ø 32 mm throttle body	38 Ø mm throttle body and single injector	Electronic injection system with electric fuel pump, Ø 38 mm throttle body and single injector
Drivetrain							
Transmission	Automatic expandable pulley variator with torque server, V belt, self-ventilating automatic centrifugal dry clutch		Automatic expandable pulley variator with torque server, V belt, self-ventilating automatic centrifugal dry clutch, gear reduction unit and transmission housing with forced air circulation cooling				
Front Suspension	Hydraulic telescopic fork with Ø 35 mm stem					Hydraulic telescopic fork with Ø 41 mm stem	
Rear Suspension	Two double-acting shock absorbers, adjustable to four positions at preloading						
Front Brakes	Ø 260 mm disc brake with hydraulic control activated by handlebar right-side lever						
Rear Brakes	Ø 260 mm disc brake with hydraulic control activated by handlebar left-side lever					Ø 240 mm disc brake with hydraulic control activated by handlebar left-side lever	
Front Tire	110/70-16"						
Rear Tire	140/70-16"					150/70-14"	
Electricity							
Ignition	Electronic CDI and variable advance, with separate H.V. coil			Electronic, inductive, high efficiency ignition, integrated with the injection system, with variable advance and separate H.V. coil			
Battery	12V 10 Ah		12V 12 Ah				
Dimensions							
Wheelbase	1470 mm		1455 mm	1470 mm		1550 mm	
Length	2110 mm		2100 mm	2110 mm		2215 mm	
Width	770 mm		837 mm (over mirrors)	875 mm (over mirrors)	770 mm	770 mm	
Seat Height	790 mm		785 mm	790 mm			
Weight (dry)	161 kg		149 kg	160 kg	165 kg	189 kg	193 kg
Liquids capacity							
Fuel	~10 L, including 2 L reserve					~13.2 L, including 3 L reserve	
Engine oil	1.1 L	1.1 L	1.2 L	1.3 L engine oil (oil and oil filters change 1.2 L)		1.7 L engine oil (at oil and filter change 1.5 L)	
Cooling system	1.75 L						
Performance							
Power Output	11 kW (15 hp) at 9,750 rpm			16.2 kW (21.7 hp) at 8,250 rpm	16.1 kW (21.6 hp) at 7,250 rpm	25 kW (34 hp) at 7500 rpm	29 kW (39 hp) at 7250 rpm
Torque	12 Nm at 8,000 rpm			20.2 Nm at 6,500 rpm	23 Nm at 6,000 rpm	37.6 Nm at 5500 rpm	40 Nm at 5500 rpm
Max. Speed		125 km/h		125 km/h			

	(2011-on) 125 i.e.	(2011-on) 300 i.e.	(2011-on) 350 i.e.	(2021-on) 300 i.e.	(2021-on) 400 i.e.
Engine					
Engine Type	124 cc single-cylinder, four-stroke	278 cc single-cylinder, four-stroke	330 cc single-cylinder, four-stroke	278 cc single-cylinder, four-stroke	399 cc single-cylinder, four-stroke
Bore/Stroke	57.0 x 48.6 mm	75 x 63 mm	78 x 69 mm	75 x 63 mm	84 x 72 mm
Compression Ratio	12:1 (±0.5)	11:1 (±0.5)	12:1 (±0.5)		
Fuel system	32 MIU4.E0 Electronic injection with Ø 32 mm throttle body and electric fuel pump	32 MIU1.E9 electronic injection, with Ø 32 mm throttle body and electric fuel pump	IAWM3G electronic injection, with Ø 38 mm throttle body, electric fuel pump	Electronic injection	
Drivetrain					
Transmission	Automatic expandable pulley variator with torque server, V belt, self-ventilating automatic centrifugal dry clutch, gear reduction unit and transmission housing with forced air circulation cooling			CVT continuously variable transmission, automatic centrifugal dry clutch	CVT continuously variable transmission, automatic centrifugal multiplate wet clutch
Front Suspension	Hydraulic telescopic fork with Ø 35 mm stem		Hydraulic telescopic fork		
Rear Suspension	Two double-acting shock absorbers, adjustable to four positions at preloading			Dual hydraulic shock absorbers adjustable in preload	
Front Brakes	Ø 300 mm disc brake with hydraulic control activated by handlebar right-side lever		Ø 300 mm disc brake with hydraulic control activated by handlebar right-side lever; braking assisted by ABS system	Ø 300 mm disc brake; braking assisted by ABS and ASR system	
Rear Brakes	Ø 240 mm disc brake with hydraulic control activated by handlebar left-side lever		Ø 240 mm rear disc brake with hydraulic control activated by the handlebar left-side lever; braking assisted by ABS system	Ø 240 mm rear disc brake; braking assisted by ABS and ASR system	
Front Tire	110/70-16"				120/70-16"
Rear Tire	140/70-14"		150/70-14"	140/70-14"	150/70-14"
Electricity					
Ignition	Electronic, inductive, high efficiency ignition, integrated with the injection system, with variable advance and separate H.V. coil				
Battery	12V 10 Ah		12V 12Ah		
Dimensions					
Wheelbase	1535 mm		1560 mm	1540 mm	1550 mm
Length	2150 mm		2215 mm	2125 mm	2155 mm
Width	780 mm		760 mm	800 mm	
Seat Height	790 mm				
Weight (dry)	165 kg	171 kg	179 kg		
Liquids capacity					
Fuel	13 L			12 L	
Engine oil	1.3 L engine oil (oil and oil filters change 1.2 L)		1.5 L		
Cooling system	1.75 L				
Performance					
Power Output	11 kW (15 hp) at 9,250 rpm	16.3 kW (21.9 hp) at 7,250 rpm	24.5 kW (32.9 hp) at 8250 rpm	19 kW (25 hp) at 8,000 rpm	26 kW (35 hp) at 7,500 rpm
Torque	12 Nm at 7,250 rpm	23 Nm at 5,750 rpm	32.3 Nm at 6250 rpm	26 Nm at 6,250 rpm	37.7 Nm at 5,500 rpm
Max. Speed		135 km/h			

== Gallery ==
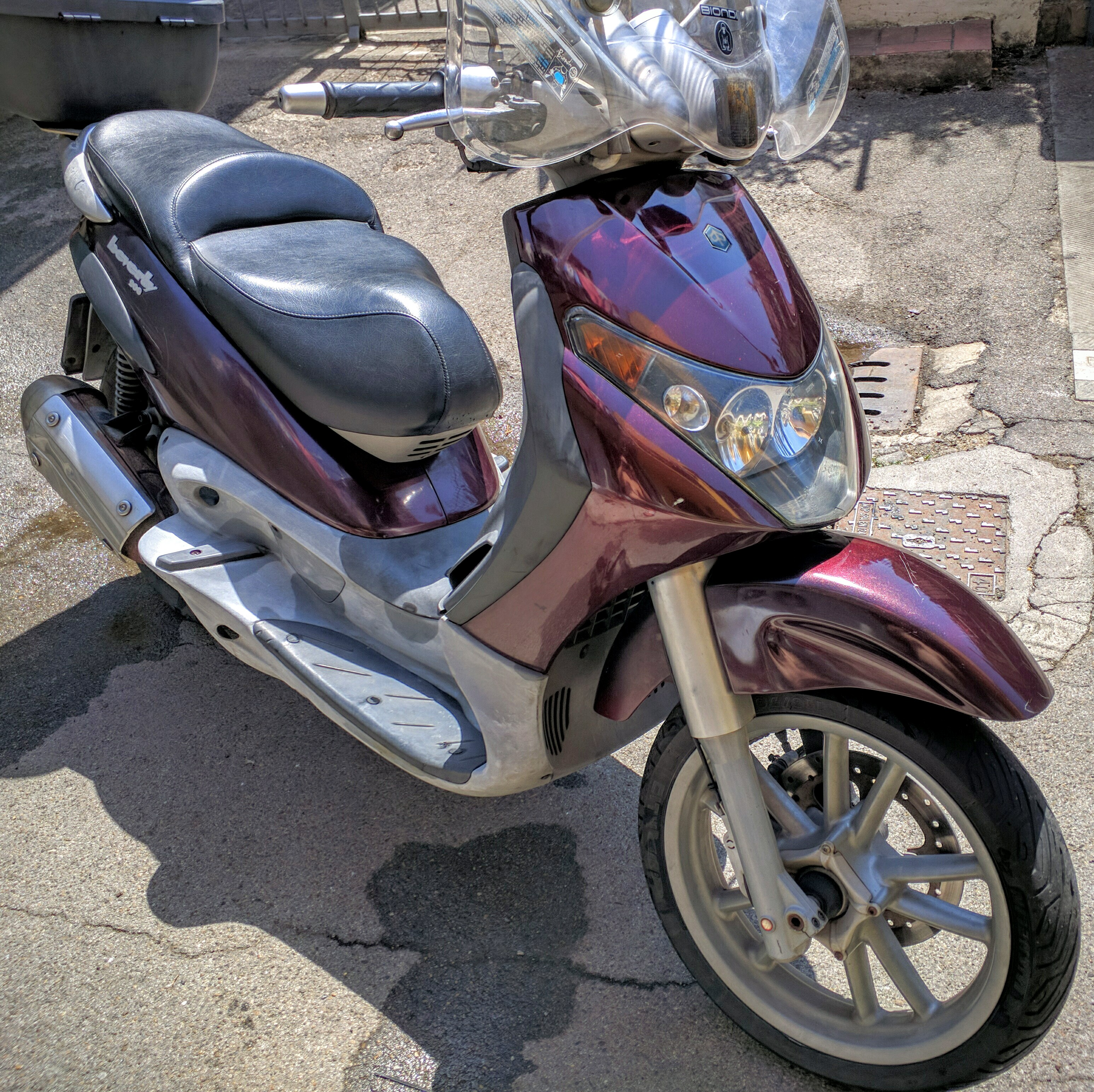
Piaggio Beverly 200

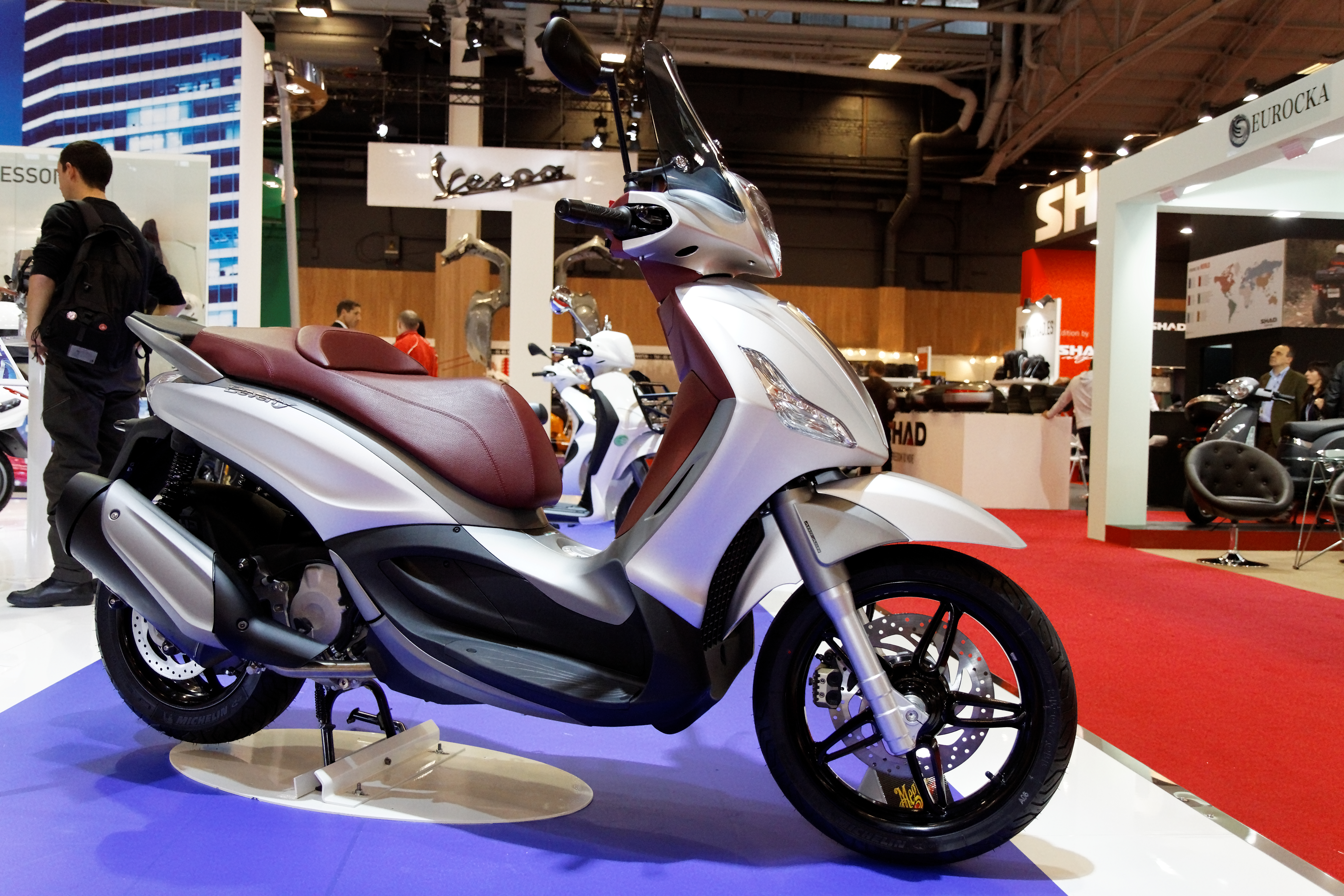
2011 Piaggio Beverly Sport Touring 350
