= Malossi =

Italian manufacturer

Malossi S.p.A.
- Company type: Società per Azioni (joint stock company)
- Industry: Engine tuning
- Founded: 1930
- Headquarters: Calderara di Reno, Italy
- Key people: Ugo Malossi; Sandro Malossi; Alessandra Malossi; Andrea Malossi
- Products: Scooter, moped and motorcycle parts
- Website: www.malossi.com

Malossi S.p.A. is an Italian manufacturer of tuning parts for mopeds and scooters. It was founded by Armando Malossi in 1930.

Originally the company specialised in tuning Dell'Orto carburettors for motorcycles. This strong association continues to this day with Malossi providing a huge array of carburettors and kits for mopeds, scooters, and motorcycles. Among other products, Malossi manufactures cylinders and variators for both racing and road use. Malossi currently produces two product lines, the Malossi and the MHR (Malossi Hyper Racing), which is exclusively for racing use.

Malossi's main competitor is Polini, also based in Italy.

== History ==
In 1930, Armando Malossi founded "Cicli e Moto Malossi". Armando started his business in Bologna, a city that was greatly impoverished by wars: first the African war and later World War II. Despite the few bicycles - as all motor vehicles were requisitioned for war use - the family business grew and moved outside of Bologna to escape the bombings.

The post-war period gave new momentum to the company. Mr. Armando began to deal with bicycles, auxiliary motor vehicles, and motorcycle repair and restoration. Ugo Malossi, Armando's eldest son, joined his father's business. Driven by a unique passion for motorcycles, Ugo began the complete construction of motorcycles, starting from the frame of a 75 cc light bike.

Ugo convinced his father Armando to purchase Mar, a historic company that provided support for Dell'Orto carburetors. Ugo also introduced a division for designing two and four-stroke engines for mopeds, light bikes, and scooters, dedicating himself to what he loved most, an activity that led him to success. As the country grew and habits changed, the car became the nation's object of desire. These were the years of the economic boom.

Ugo saw the opportunity to tap into this market and started the production of carburetors for cars, racing cars, and industrial use. He never abandoned his old passion for motorcycles. In 1960, Ugo and Sergio Bassi, a friend and long-time collaborator, prepared a Ducati motorcycle for Mr. Cova (a famous motorcycle rider), who finished second in the Bologna – San Luca race.

In 1969, Sandro, Ugo's younger brother, joined the company as sales and IT network manager. Business did well internationally causing the need to expand, hire new staff, develop new sectors and new professional skills.

In the 70s the company moved to Calderara di Reno, maintaining only an operational headquarters in the center of Bologna. In 1977, Malossi participated in EICMA, the most prestigious fair in the automotive sector, with its own stand.

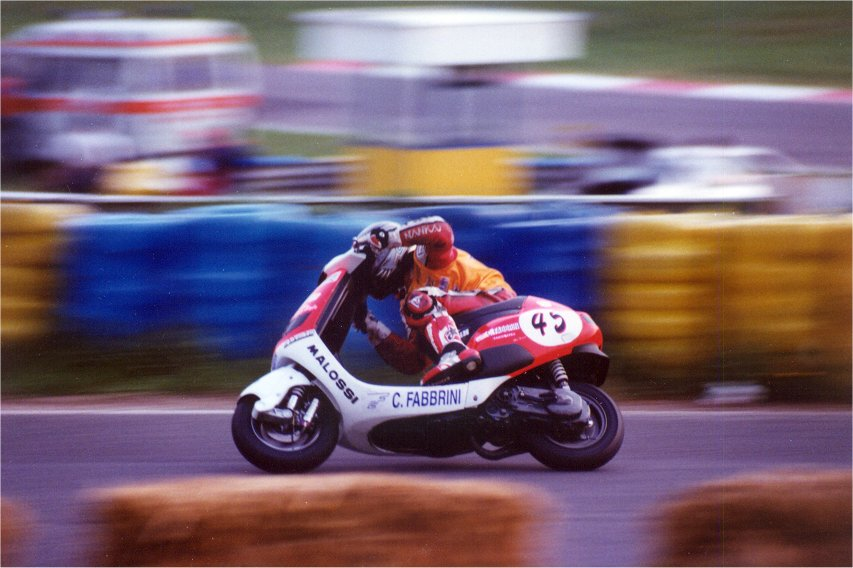
Malossi tuned scooter

In 1978, the first Malossi transformation kit for the Yamaha TY 50 cc enduro, consisting of a muffler, cylinder, head, and piston, was born. The kit's success was explosive: 9,000 units sold in the first year. This would be the first of a long series of conversion kits for many manufacturers and engines.

In the 1970s, the creation of the first kits for automatic mopeds by Motobécane and Peugeot led Malossi to engage with the racing world. These scooters were, in fact, the protagonists of very popular single-brand trophies, especially in France. The racing division was born under Sandro's guidance: the Malossi Trophies were held not only in Italy but also in Greece, England, Spain, France, and Germany.

Production further expanded with kits for Vespa 50 and T3: Italy became the company's primary reference market. Andrea, Ugo’s eldest son, joined the company at a young age as a test driver and quality control manager.

In 1986, Alessandra, Ugo's second child, joined the company and became responsible for product marketing. Her enthusiasm and feminine touch made the products, already technically perfect, even better in terms of packaging and after-sales service.

In 1988, the Malossi MVR 50 cc moped was born, entirely designed and built in-house. The business expanded further, increasing the number of partner workshops it worked with.

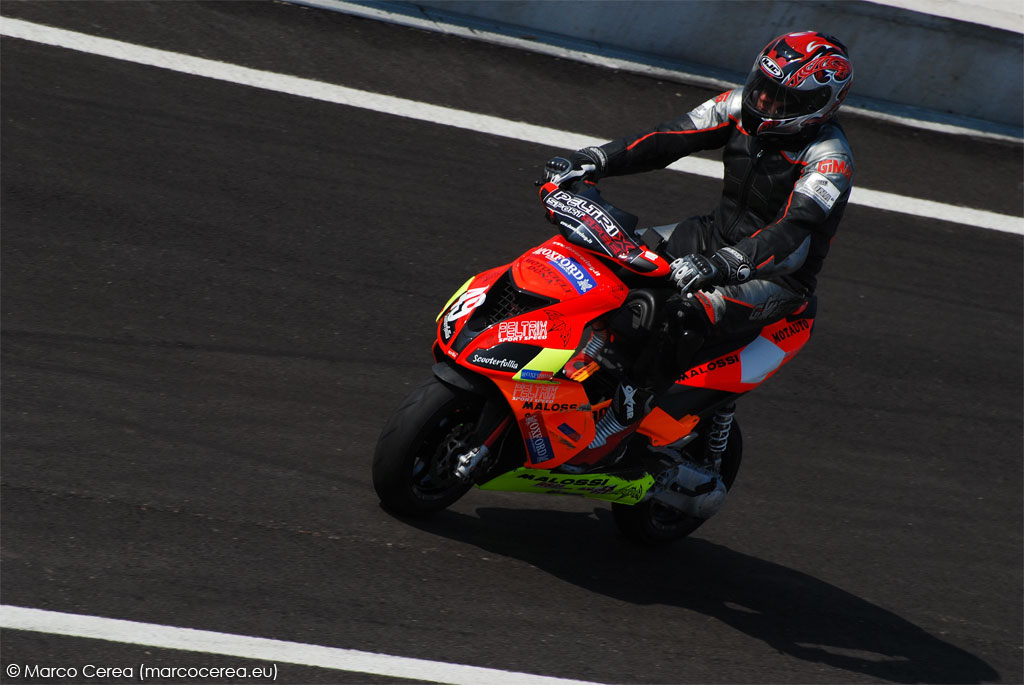
2008 Aprilia SR50 Trofeo Malossi

In the 2000s, the company further opened up to the world and moved to its current headquarters in Calderara di Reno: a 12,000 square meter plant, large enough to house the production robotic islands, a vast warehouse, test rooms, and laboratories necessary to confirm Malossi as a world reference point for two-wheeled components.

== See also ==
- List of Italian companies
