= Polini =

Italian manufacturer of vehicle parts

Polini S.p.A.
- Company type: Società per Azioni (joint stock company)
- Industry: Bike manufacturing Engine tuning
- Founded: 1945
- Headquarters: Alzano Lombardo, Bergamo
- Key people: Battista Polini
- Products: minibikes and Tuning parts for motorcycles, mopeds, scooters

Polini S.p.A. is an Italian manufacturer of tuning parts for motorcycles, mopeds, and scooters founded in 1945. Among other products, they produce cylinders and variators for both racing and road use. They also produce pocket bikes with 50cc up to 15 hp.

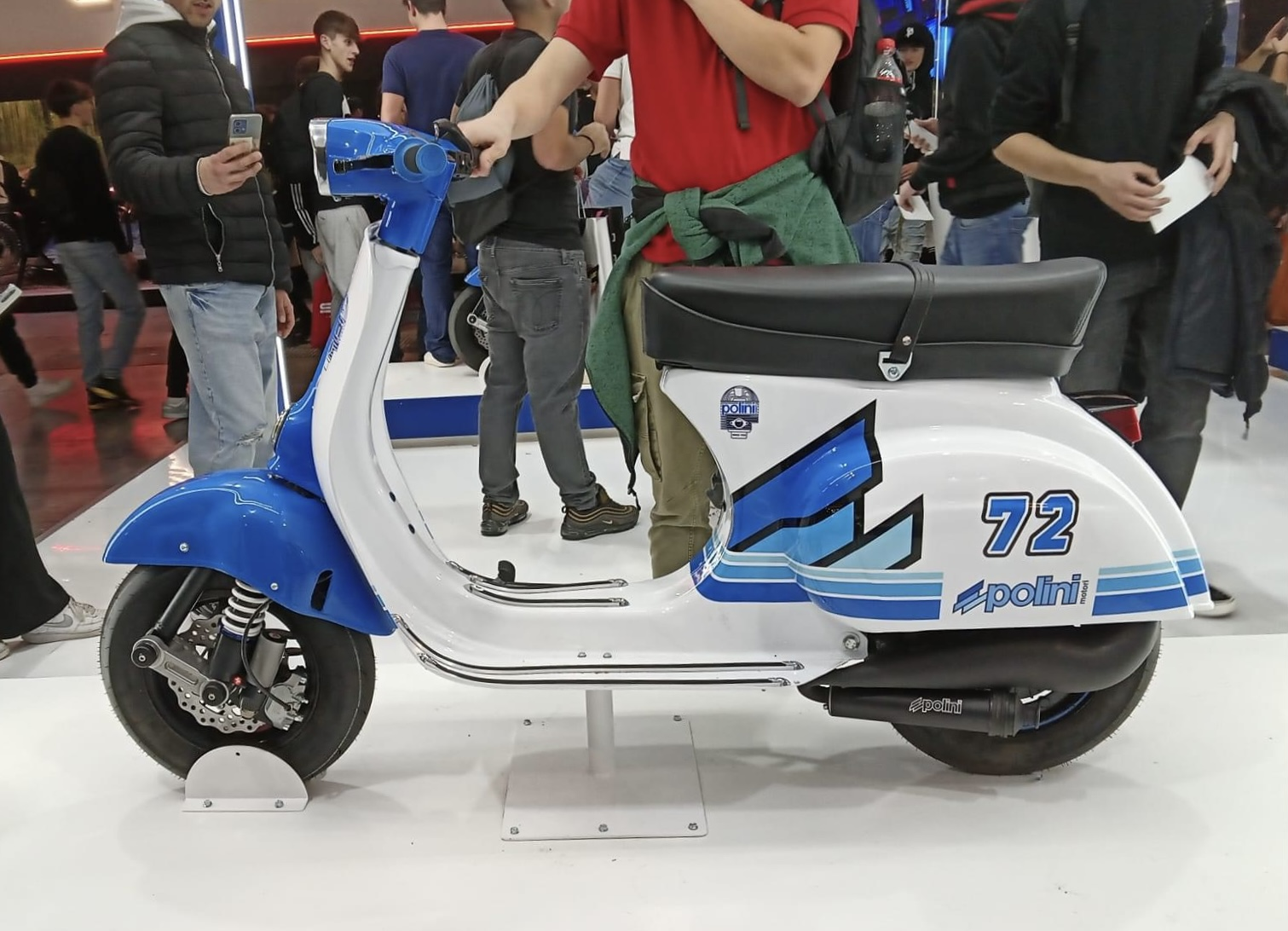
Piaggio Vespa tuned by Polini

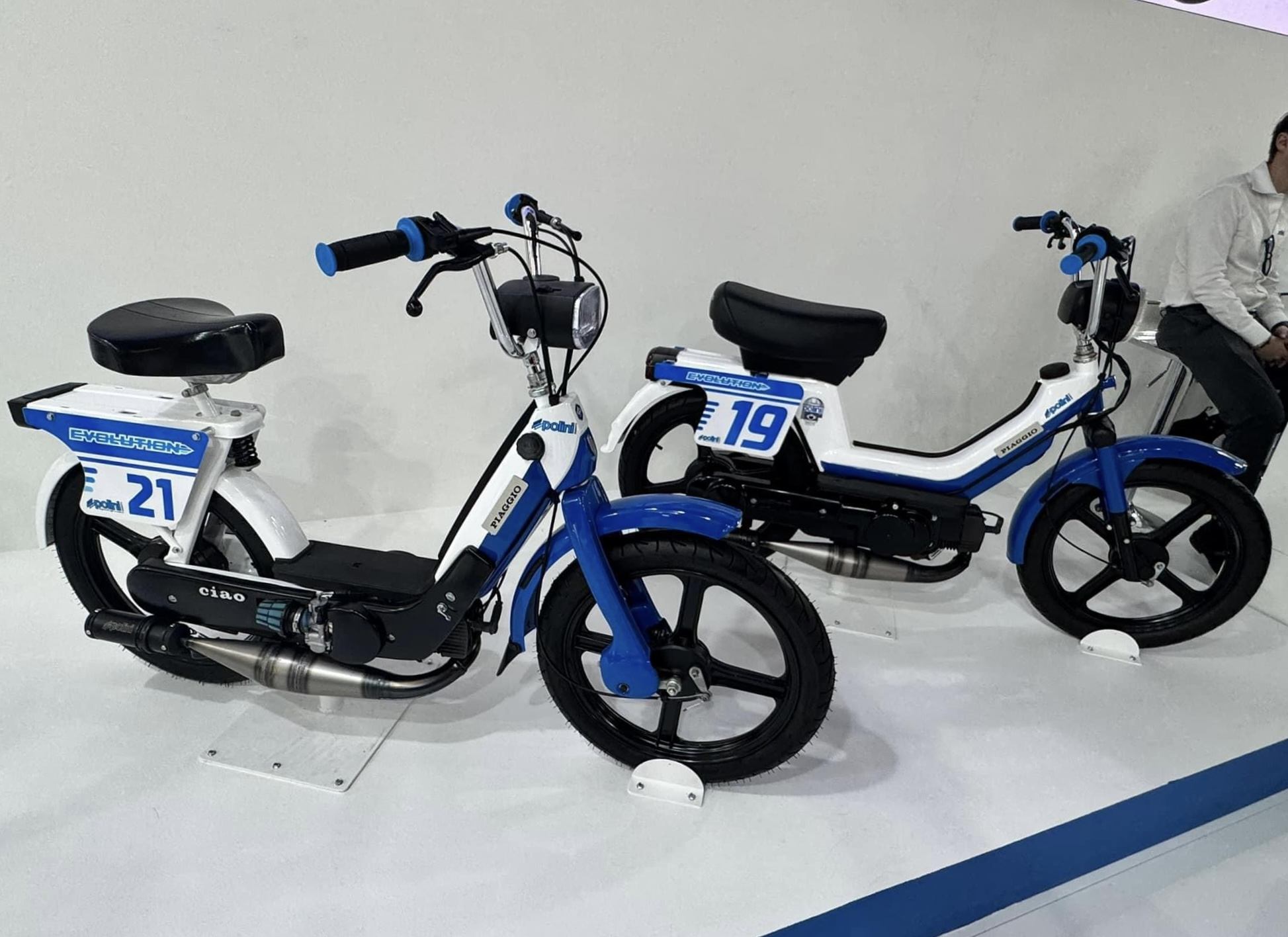
Piaggio Ciao tuned by Polini

The company was founded when the Italian soldier Battista Polini returned from his service in World War II and started making bicycles, which sold very well. The first logo of the company was a ram, which was the coat of arms of Battista's battalion. When the first Vespa and Lambretta scooters emerged in the 1940s, manufacture of parts for these was started.

Today, Polini is owned by Battista Polini's three sons Carlo, Franco, and Piero. Tuning parts are manufactured for all major brands of scooters and motorcycles. Polini also produces a line of miniature folding scooters called SkAtE.

The company has also produced very small engines—notably the Polini Thor 250 / 250-DS water-cooled, two-stroke engine—for use in paramotors for powered parachutes, and in ultralight aircraft. Though that line is apparently discontinued, the engines remain listed, on the menu of its website, as "Out of Stock Models," and remain available, used, and in wide use on active aircraft.

Polini's main competitors are Malossi, which is also based in Italy, and Top Performances Racing.

== See also ==
- List of Italian companies
