= Piaggio Porter =

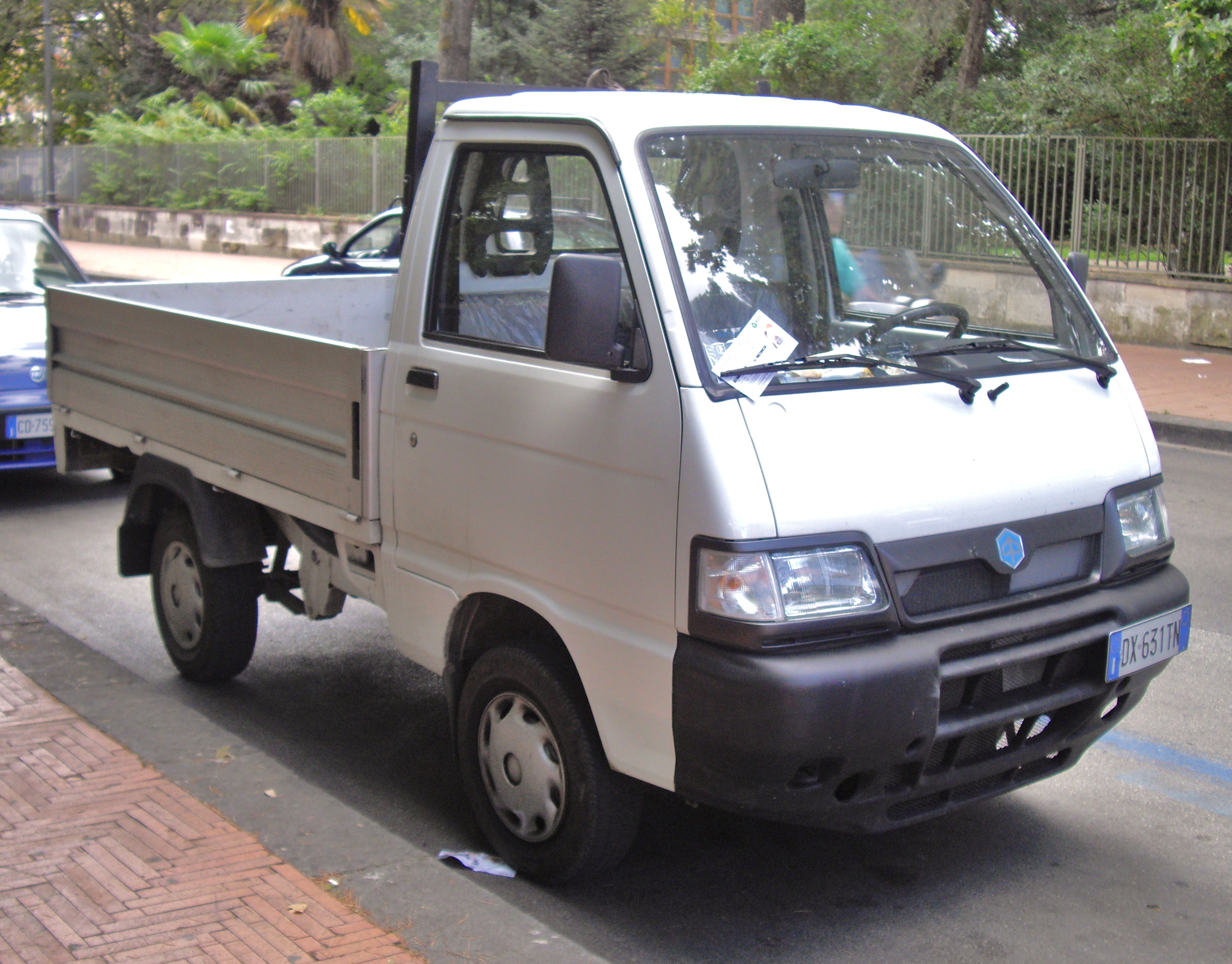

Overview
- Manufacturer: Piaggio
- Production: 1992–present

Body and chassis
- Class: Light commercial vehicle
- Body style: Van; Pickup

The Piaggio Porter is a cab over microvan and pick-up produced and sold by the Italian company Piaggio since 1992 under the Piaggio Commercial Vehicle brand.

== First generation (1992) ==
First generation (S90)
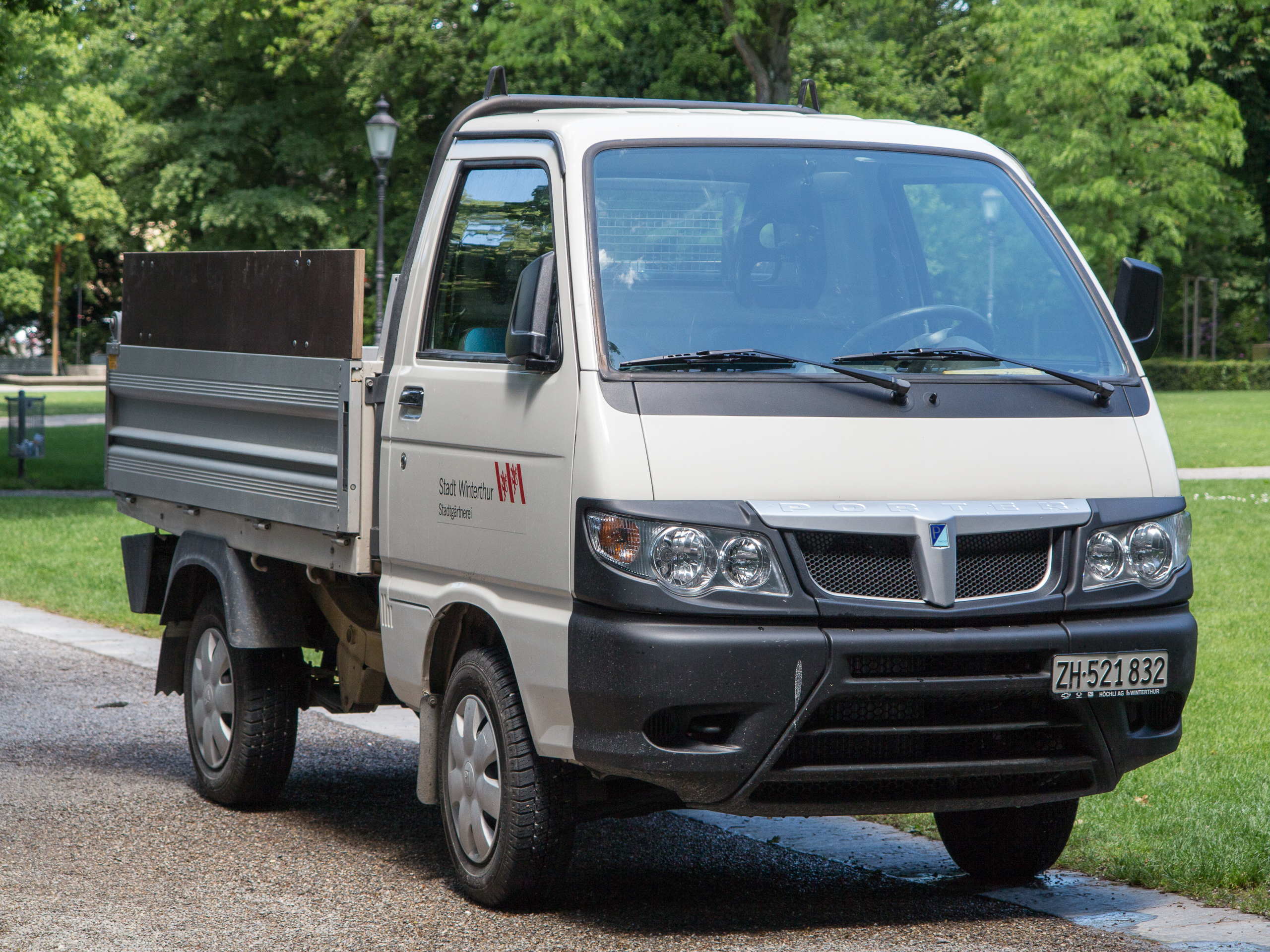

Overview
- Also called: Daihatsu Hijet; Innocenti Porter
- Production: 1992–2021 (Italy); 2013–2019 (India)
- Assembly: Pontedera, Italy; Baramati, India

Body and chassis
- Class: minivan; pick-up
- Body style: 3 or 5-door Van; 2-door Pickup truck
- Layout: mid-engine, rear-wheel drive; four-wheel drive
- Platform: S90
- Related: Daihatsu Hijet (S80); Piaggio Quargo

Powertrain
- Engine: 993 cc CB-41/42 I3; 1295 cc HC-C I4; 1299 cc MultiTech I4; 1221 cc Lombardini I4 diesel; 1371 cc Lombardini I4 diesel; 1200 cc D120 I2 diesel
- Transmission: 4 or 5-speed manual

Dimensions
- Wheelbase: 1,810–2,180 mm (71.3–85.8 in)
- Length: 3,370–4,400 mm (132.7–173.2 in)
- Width: 1,395–1,560 mm (54.9–61.4 in)
- Height: 1,710–1,870 mm (67.3–73.6 in)

=== Development ===
The collaboration project between Piaggio and Daihatsu involved in the creation of a joint-venture with a capital of thirty billion Lire of which 51% will be in the hands of Piaggio and 49% will go to the Japanese Daihatsu. The minivans will be built in Piaggio's Pontedera factories, and the expected investment is approximately 150 billion Lire, of which 65 will be borne by the joint venture. According to the indications illustrated in 1990, by the Pontedera assembly lines, 35,000 vehicles are expected to come out per year for a total turnover of 350 billion per year. Twenty thousand will be sold in Europe and North Africa by Piaggio, while the other 15 thousand will be marketed directly by Daihatsu in the UK and ASEAN Market. The new small commercial vehicle, called Porter for the European market, would allow the Italian manufacturer to offer a larger and more capable alternative to the classic Piaggio Ape.

=== Debut ===
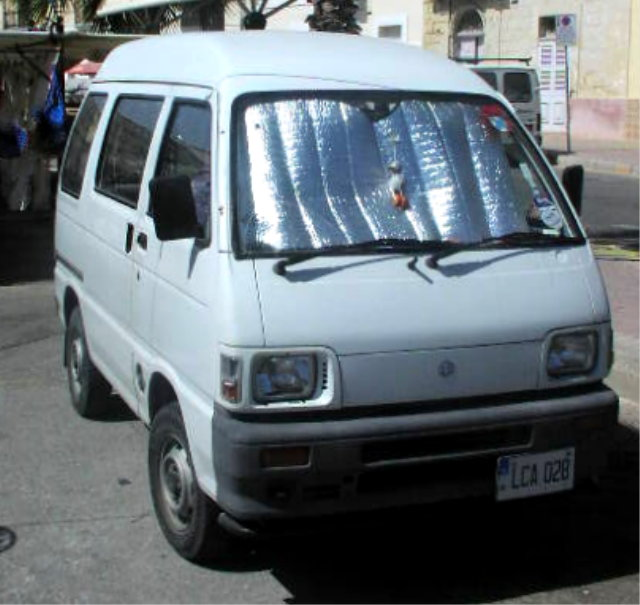
1993 Piaggio Porter Van

The definitive model went into production in Pontedera in September 1992 and was marketed on the European market in the spring of the following year (both as Piaggio Porter and as Daihatsu Hijet in some Asian and UK market). Much of the mechanics components were produced by Daihatsu in its factories in Japan and assembled in Italy by Piaggio. The Porter was developed starting from the Japanese keivan Daihatsu Hijet S80, using the same frame and the same sheet metal, but the front section has been redesigned and strengthened using reinforced steels to withstand crash tests for European homologations. The interior is also totally new.

The initial three versions were a panel van for the transport of goods, a glazed van with 4 seats for the transport of people, and pickups, all equipped with a three-cylinder petrol engine of 1000 cm^{3} produced by Daihatsu. An additional version is the ambulance version, intended above all for Italian villages with access difficulties.

In 1995 the versions with diesel engines were presented, equipped with a 1200 cm^{3} four-cylinder engine produced by Lombardini. In the same year, the petrol version was changed, now equipped with multipoint electronic injection and a catalytic converter, and a fourth version, Porter Tipper, a pickup with a tipper platform, was made available in both engines.

Subsequently, a version with all-wheel drive (4x4) was also made available in the petrol engine alone. The versions equipped with an internal combustion engine are also accompanied by a version equipped with an electric motor. The 4- and 6-seater glazed van versions were also marketed between 1994 and 1997 by Innocenti as Innocenti Porter.

=== 1998: first facelift ===
In 1998 it underwent a major facelift and was equipped with the new 1.300 16V Daihatsu petrol and 1,400 Lombardini diesel engines. In 2002 the commercialization in the European market of the Daihatsu-branded version ended following the liquidation of the joint venture signed in 1992; production from that moment continued only under the aegis of Piaggio.

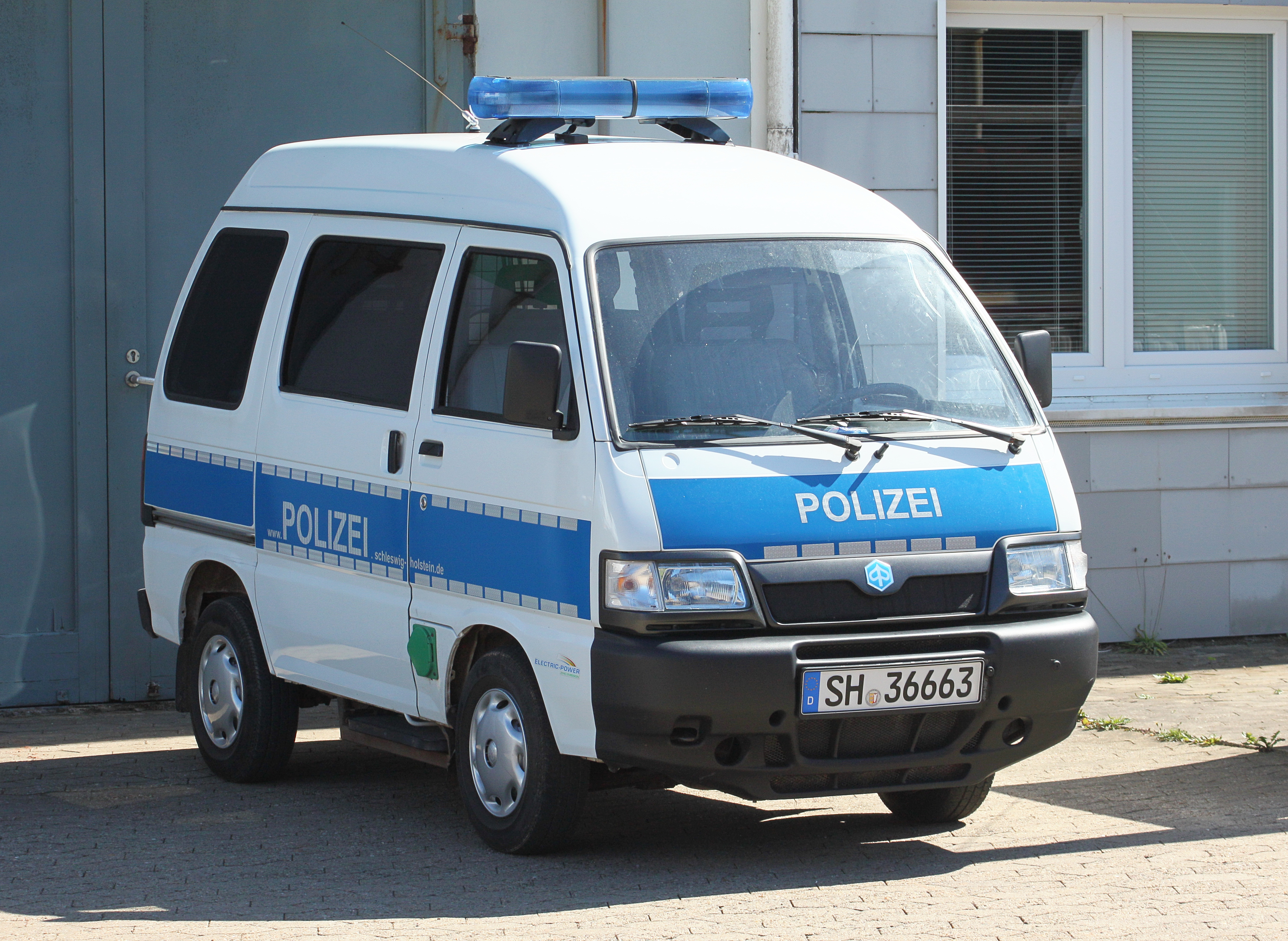
Porter electric (facelift)

In 2003, the petrol and diesel versions were joined by those fueled by LPG.

In 2002 the Maxxi version was presented, equipped with twin rear wheels so as to give the possibility of increasing the payload to 1,100 kg, also available in the 4x4 version with all-wheel drive. In addition, the range of versions and equipment is also extended with all-wheel drive (a system made by Grecav).

In 2006 the Euro 4 petrol version was presented, which, thanks to the integration of the Japanese Daihatsu system with a control unit produced by the Italian CF3000, manages to overcome the new stringent emission limits. At the same time, the marketing of the version with a diesel engine ceases.

In 2008, the Euro 4 LPG version called "Eco Power" was launched. The versions provided are the pickup, the chassis, the van, and the Tipper (tipper). The updated version of the Maxxi Porter is also presented. The new outfitting of the engine of the LPG version and of the chassis of the Maxxi version will now be completely carried out within the Piaggio - Commercial Vehicles - plant in Pontedera.

Also in 2008 was presented the Maxxi version with increased capacity, which allows it to reach a full load weight of 2,200 kg.

=== 2011: Second facelift ===
In 2011, the Euro 5 version made its debut, with petrol, LPG, methane, and diesel, as well as the electric version. In addition, the dashboard and the front grille are completely redesigned, which considerably modernizes the vehicle. The diesel range consists of the new twin-cylinder engines developed by Piaggio and Ricardo: the 1.2-liter P120 is equipped with a turbocharger, EGR, and common rail direct injection, delivers 64 horsepower and 140 Nm of maximum torque. It is Euro 5 approved with a standard particulate filter. The P100 is a naturally aspirated 1.0 available in emerging markets without a turbocharger. Both engines are produced in the Piaggio factory in Baramati in India.

In 2013, after years of absence on the market, a 4x4 version of the Porter Euro 5B+ range, produced by Officine Cucini, returns.

In November 2015 the engine range has been homologated according to the Euro 6 emission standard.

In 2020 the production of the first generation ends, replaced by the new Porter NP6 made by Piaggio in Pontedera together with the Chinese manufacturer Foton.

=== Indian version (2013-2019) ===
In 2013 the Porter was launched on the Indian market, produced at the Piaggio Vehicle India Private Ltd. plant in Baramati. The model replaced the previous Ape Mini Truck 500. It was proposed in the 600 and 1000 versions with a maximum capacity of 600 kg and 1000 kg. The Porter 600 comes with 511 cm^{3} single cylinder diesel engine mated to a 4-speed manual gearbox. The Porter 1000 comes with 1034 cm^{3} twin-cylinder four-stroke diesel engine mated to a 5-speed manual gearbox.

== Second generation (2021) ==
Second generation (NP6)
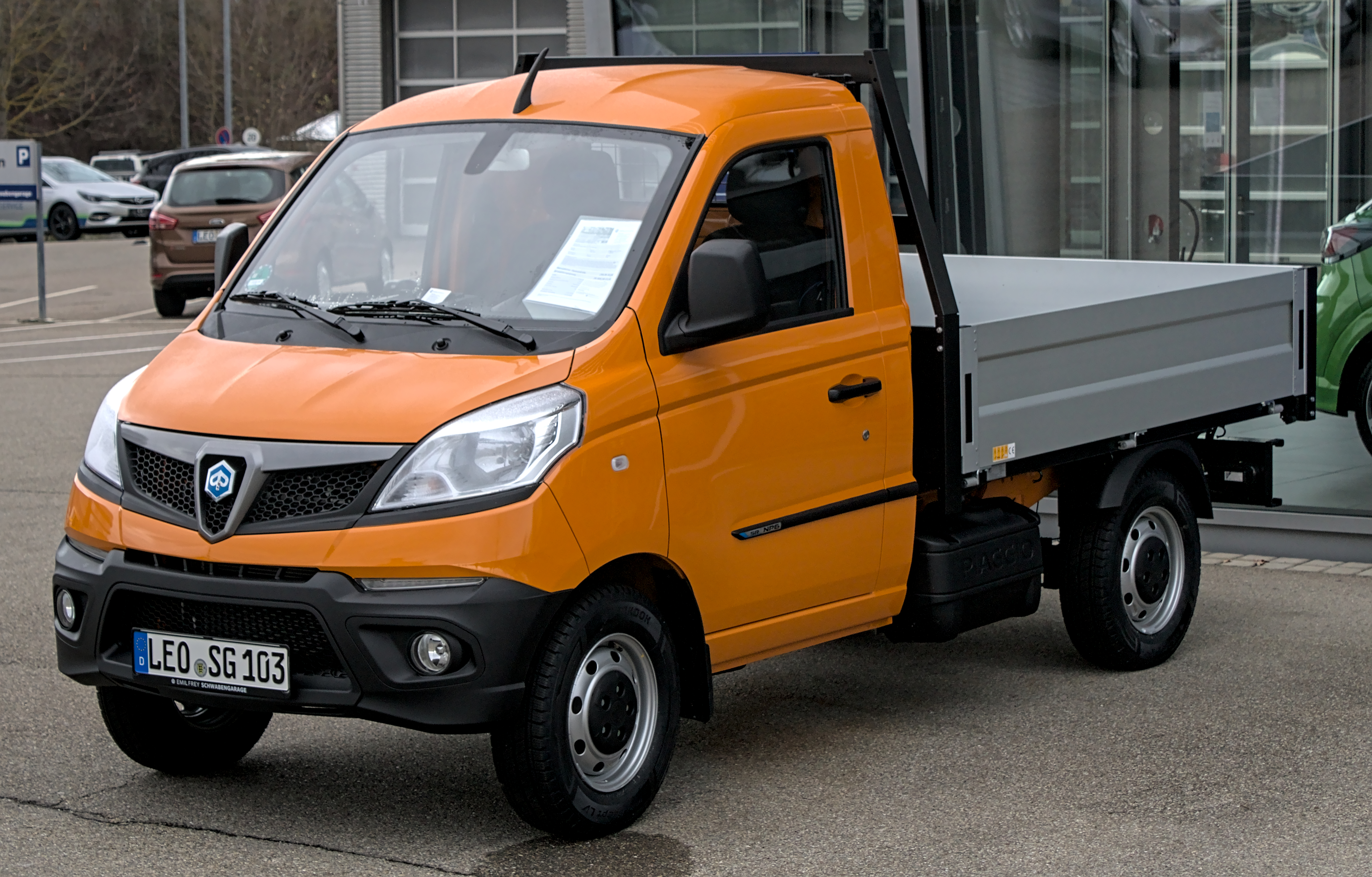
- Piaggio Porter NP6.

Overview
- Also called: Foton Gratour V3
- Production: 2021–present
- Assembly: Pontedera, Italy

Body and chassis
- Class: pick-up
- Body style: 2-door Pickup truck
- Layout: mid-engine, rear-wheel drive

Powertrain
- Engine: 1498 cc CombiFuel I4
- Transmission: 5-speed manual

Dimensions
- Wheelbase: 2,650–3,250 mm (104.3–128.0 in)
- Length: 4,315–5,095 mm (169.9–200.6 in)
- Width: 1,680–1,800 mm (66.1–70.9 in)
- Height: 1,840 mm (72.4 in)

Piaggio presented the second generation, called the Piaggio Porter NP6 in January 2021. The new model is built together with Foton Group, and the new Porter is derived from the Foton Gratour V3 but was completely redesigned and reengineering by Piaggio to be approved according to European emissions and safety standards. Production takes place in the Piaggio factory in Pontedera.

The engine range is Euro 6D Final approved and consists of a four-cylinder 1,498 cm^{3} engine with an aluminum alloy crankcase and head, 16-valve timing with a double overhead camshaft controlled by a chain, and a double phase variator on intake and exhaust. Maximum power is 78 kW at 6,000 rpm, while maximum engine torque is 136 Nm at 4,500 rpm.

The engine is available with CombiFuel petrol/LPG and petrol/methane, both offered in the Short Range variants, dedicated to mainly urban use, and Long Range, capable of greater autonomy and also of a higher range. The fuel tanks are firmly fixed to the frame and made of high-strength, heat-treated steel. The vehicle is designed for default operation in gas mode, except for the petrol ignition phase with the following automatic switch when the operating temperature is reached, but there is still a switch to the left of the steering wheel to manually switch the mode. The button is also equipped with four LEDs that indicate the level of gas in the tank and a green light that lights up when running on gas.

The payload increases by 30% more than its predecessor: the versions with a rear axle with single wheels can support up to 1,275 kg, while those with twin wheels exceed 1,610 kg. The Porter is thus able to carry loads well above its own weight while maintaining a ground mass not exceeding 2,800 kg.

The front suspension uses a MacPherson strut, and the rear suspension uses a rigid axle with twin-blade parabolic leaf springs, allowing a load capacity of 1,000 kg on the front axle and up to 2020 kg on the rear axle. The chassis is rear-wheel drive, ESC, ASR, ABS, and EBD as standard.

The Porter NP6 range can be customized with hundreds of variants. There are three basic models, two with a flatbed (fixed or folding) and a chassis to support the most varied set-ups.
