= Piaggio Quargo =

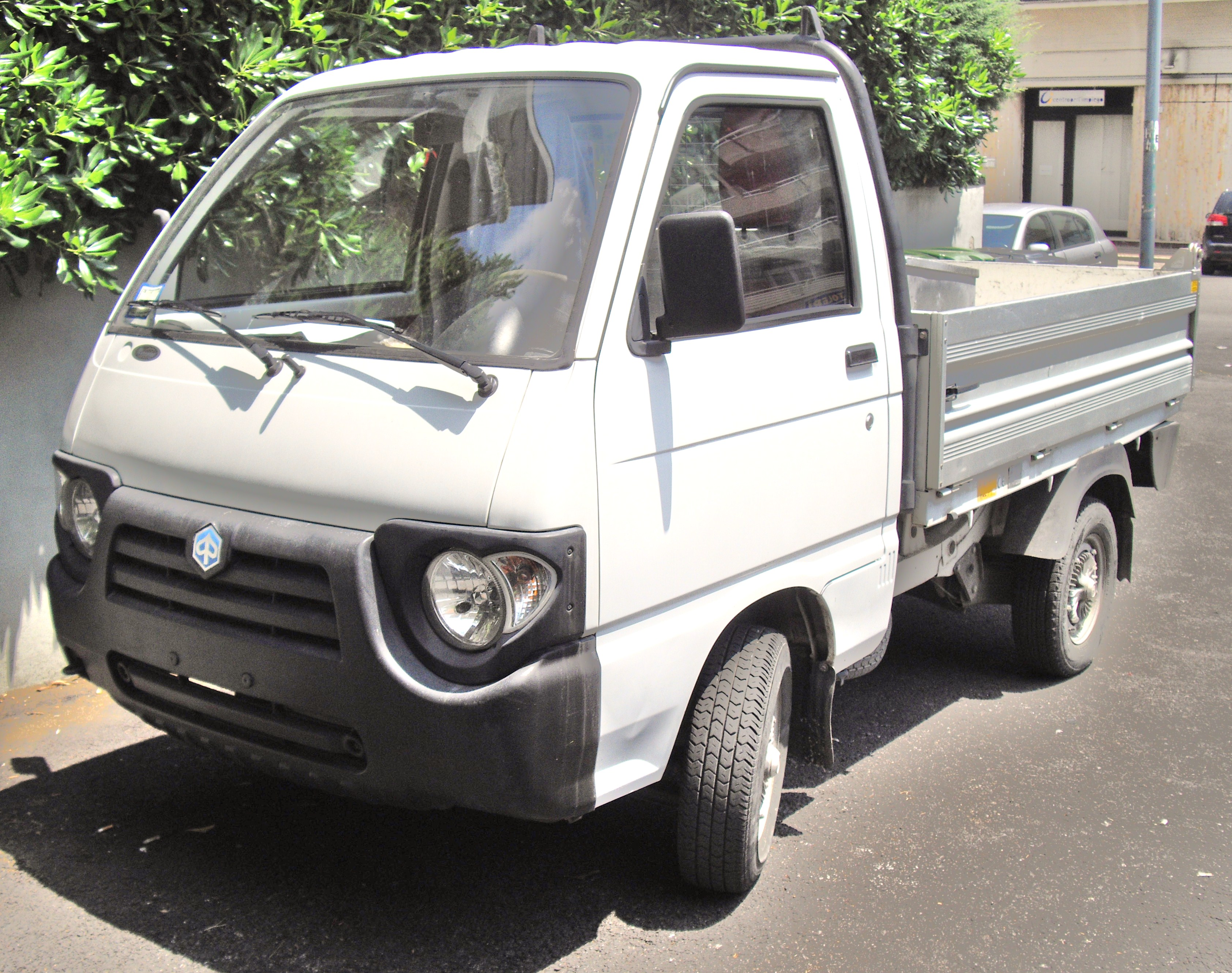

Overview
- Manufacturer: Piaggio
- Production: 2004–2016
- Assembly: Pontedera, Italy

Body and chassis
- Class: Quadricycle
- Body style: Van, Pickup

Dimensions
- Wheelbase: 1,815 mm (71.5 in)
- Length: 3,495 mm (137.6 in)
- Width: 1,460 mm (57.5 in)
- Height: 1,705–1,960 mm (67.1–77.2 in)

The Piaggio Quargo is a commercial vehicle produced by Piaggio from 2004 to 2016 and part of the category of heavy quadricycles, designed to replace the Ape Poker.

== Context ==
Made on the same base as the Piaggio Porter, from which it takes up the mechanical layout and part of the bodywork like the doors, the Quargo is equipped with a transverse, rear mounted diesel engine 686 twin cm^{3} Lombardini from 13 kW (about 18 hp).

It consists of a light quadricycle that requires the driving license B1 to be driven (it could also be driven by those who have the previous A1 and category A sub-licenses, if obtained by January 18, 2013) available in versions pick-up, tipper pick-up, van and curtainseat, with payload up to 750 kg depending on version. In 2007, the updated version was presented, with disc brakes on the front wheels and oversized oil sump.

Production ended at the end of 2016 as, with the entry into force of the anti-pollution regulations Euro 4 for quadricycles, the Quargo was not adjusted.
