= Belumbury Dany =

Small city car

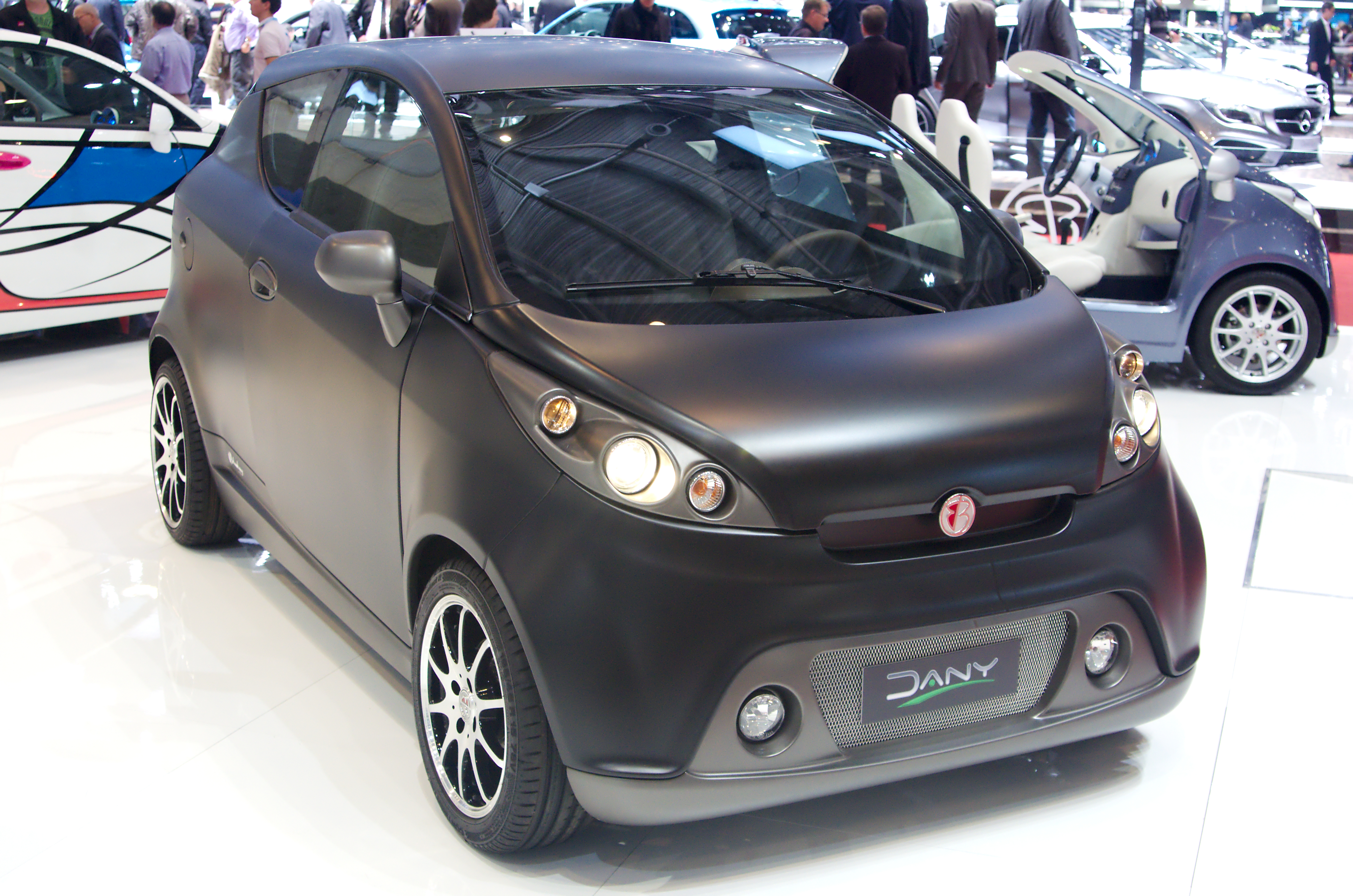
Belumbury Dany at the 2013 Geneva Motor Show

The Belumbury Dany is a city car a little over three metres, able to accommodate up to 4 people and is available with either an electrical or internal combustion engine. The Dany was developed in collaboration with the University of Camerino, with Woodpecker (manufacturer of racing cars niche) and Carcerano (Atelier design).

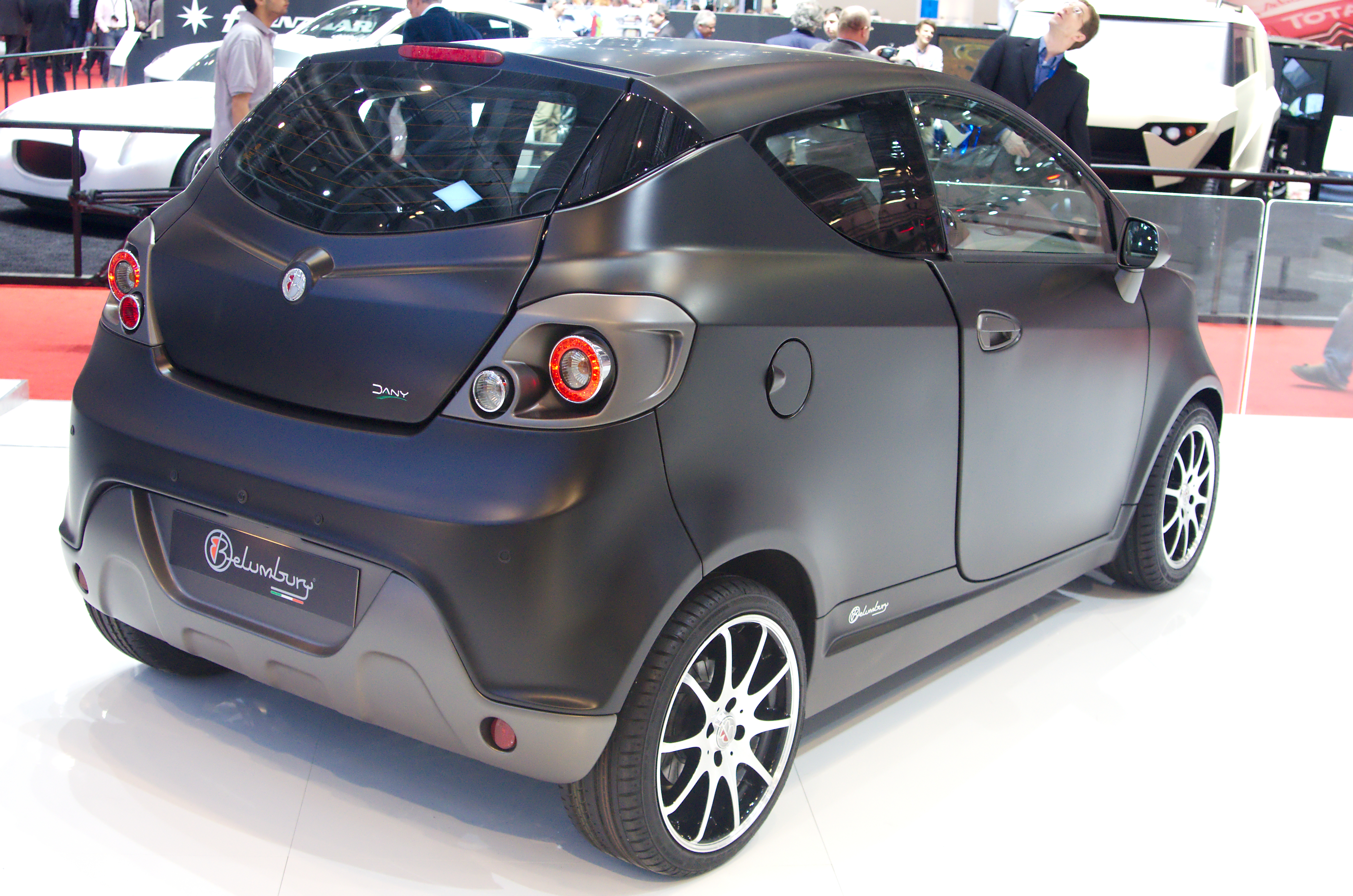
Rear end

The Dany was introduced in 2011 at the Milan International Motorcycle Show. Due to its limited speed, it is categorised as a motorised quadricycle (L7e) and can be driven with a European A1 licence.

The Dany is made in Italy – Belumbury is based in Rome – and made specifically for each customer, with seat materials, body colors and stereo options all up for debate. It intends to attract affluent customers who are looking for something entirely customizable. Belumbury has sold around 100 Dany vehicles in the year since it went on sale.

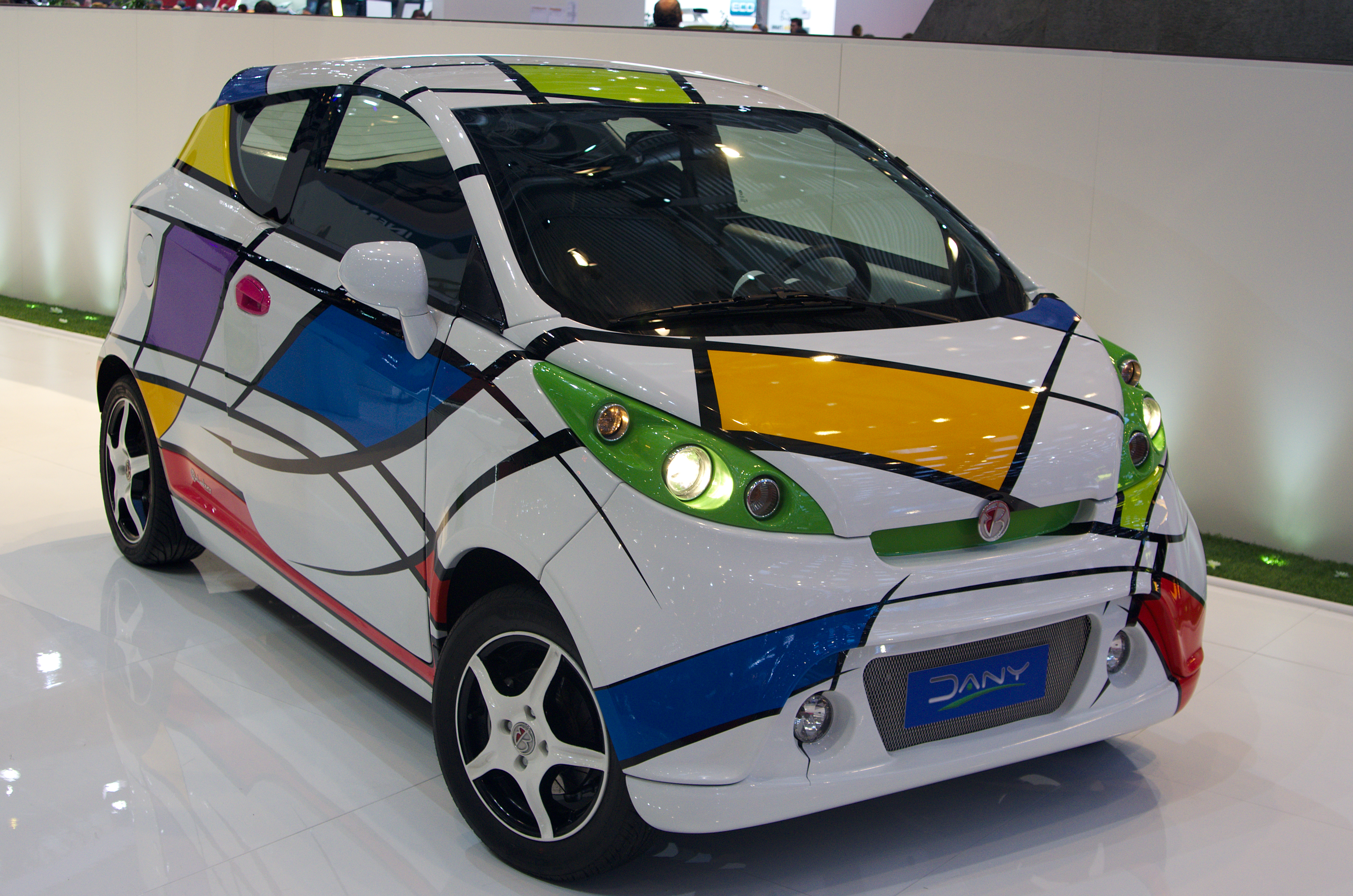
Belumbury Dany art car at the 2013 Geneva Motor Show

== Specification ==
Both electric and petrol Dany models share the same three-door hatchback body, and have a top speed of 90 km/h (55.9 mph).

=== Dany Termica ===
The petrol Dany is powered by a 505 cc Lombardini LGW 523 mpi engine, producing 15 kW. The Dany's fuel efficiency results in a consumption of 26 km/L (3.8 L/100 km; 73 mpg_{‑imp}).

=== Dany Elettrica ===
The electric Dany is powered by a 16.3-kWh lithium-iron phosphate (Li-FePO_{4}) battery and a 10-kW AC motor, the EV can drive up to 150 km (93.2 mi) at "urban speed" and over 180 km (111.8 mi) at "extraurban speed" and in Eco Mode.

== Concept models ==
The Lallo concept, designed for going-to-the-beach duty, doesn't even have doors.
