= Giotti Victoria Ginko =

Giotti Victoria Ginko is a city car made by Italian motor vehicle producer Giotti Victoria, that features a 500 cc petrol or diesel engine and scissor-style front doors.

== Description ==
The first Ginko model was a small car with a length of 274 cm. A two-cylinder Lombardini engine with a displacement of 500 cm³ provided the drive. Engine power was 16 hp for the diesel engine and 20 hp for the petrol engine.
