= Foton Gratour V3 =

Chinese mini MPV

Foton Gratour V3 (View V3)
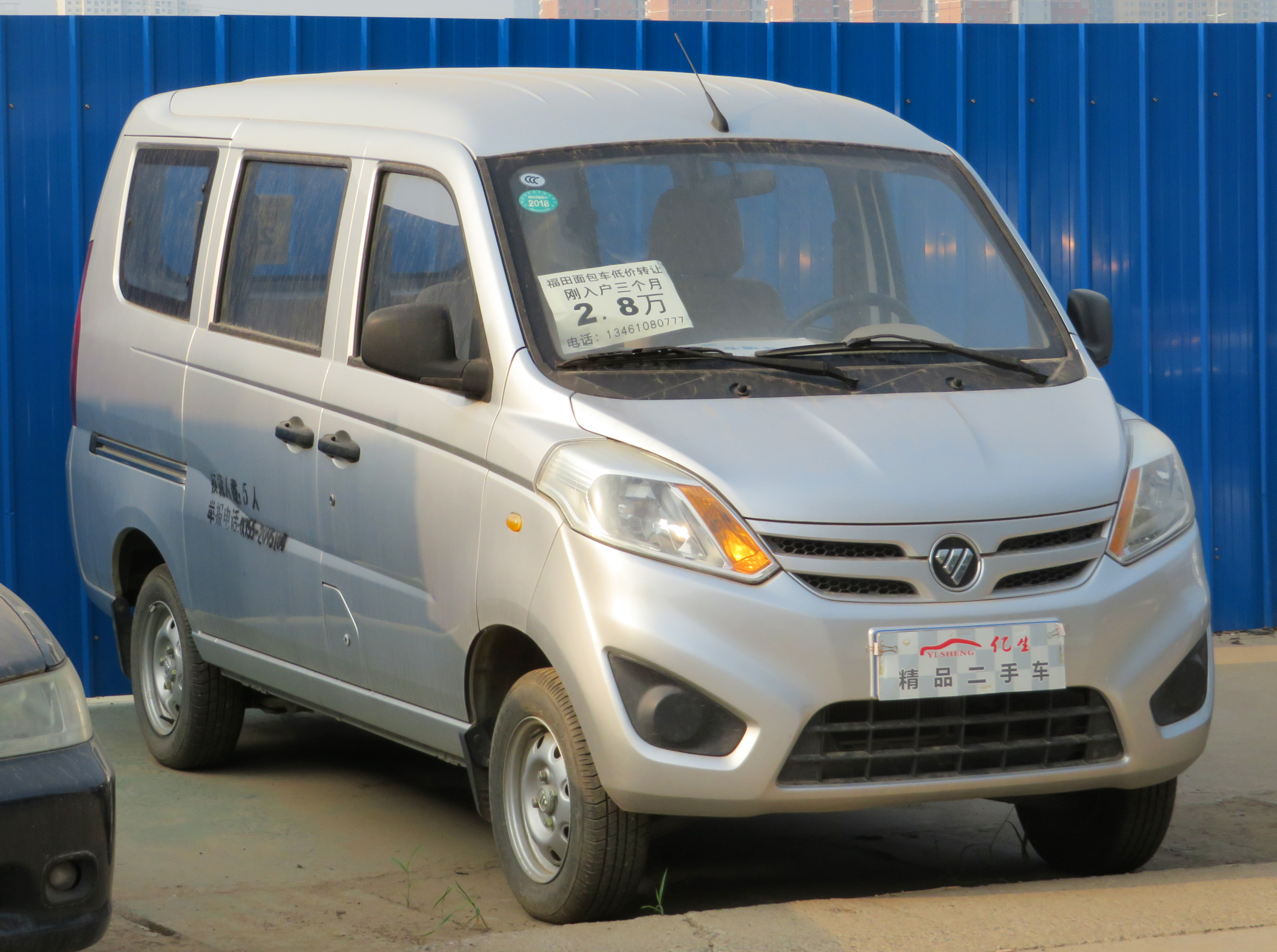

Overview
- Manufacturer: Foton
- Also called: Foton Gratour T3; Foton Xiangling V Foton Ollin T3; Foton View V3; Foton View V5; Piaggio Porter NP6; Samhung Chonji BJ5036 (pickup; North Korea)
- Production: 2014–present
- Model years: 2014–present
- Assembly: Changping, Beijing, China; Clark, Pampanga, Philippines; Pontedera, Italy (Piaggio)

Body and chassis
- Class: microvan mini truck
- Body style: 5-door van 2-door pickup truck 4-door pickup truck
- Layout: MR

Powertrain
- Engine: 1.2 L I4; 1.5 L I4
- Transmission: 5-speed manual

Dimensions
- Wheelbase: 2,500 mm (98.4 in) (V3); 3,070 mm (120.9 in) (2-door truck); 3,170 mm (124.8 in) (4-door truck)
- Length: 3,915 mm (154.1 in) (V3); 4,880 mm (192.1 in) (2-door truck); 5,130 mm (202.0 in); 4,905 mm (193.1 in) (4-door truck)
- Width: 1,640 mm (64.6 in) (V3); 1,680 mm (66.1 in) (truck)
- Height: 1,845 mm (72.6 in) (V3); 1,925 mm (75.8 in) (2-door truck); 1,935 mm (76.2 in) (4-door truck)

The Foton View V3 and Foton View V5 are microvans produced by the Chinese automaker Foton Motor.

The View V3 and V5 was originally launched as the Foton Gratour V3 in December 2014 and Foton Gratour V5 during the 2015 Shanghai Auto Show. The Foton Gratour T3 and later the Xiangling V is the mini truck variant based on the Gratour V3 and was renamed to ollin T3 from November 2016.

== Overview ==
The original Gratour V3 microvan was launched on the market in early 2015. The Gratour V3 microvan is powered by a petrol 1.0-litre engine or 1.2-litre engine, with both engines mated to a 5-speed manual transmission. The prices of the Gratour V3 microvan range between 30,000 and 40,000 Yuan.

=== Foton Gratour T3/ Ollin T3 ===
Originally launched as the Foton Gratour T3 under the Foton Gratour series, the name was first changed to Foton Ollin T3 in late 2016.

During the Foton Gratour T3 eras, the model had engine options including the 4W12M1 1.2 liter engine producing 64 kW (86 hp) and LJ469Q-1AE9 1.2 liter engine producing 65 kW (87 hp).

During the Foton Ollin T3 eras, the model had engine options including the G03 1.2 liter, Dongan DAM15DR 1.5 liter, and the Dongfeng Liuzhou sourced LJ469 1.3 liter engines.

=== Xiangling V/ View V3/ View V5 ===
During the Foton Xiangling V eras, the model had engine options including a 1.2 liter engine producing 65 kW (87 hp), a 1.2 liter engine producing 64 kW (86 hp), and a 1.5 liter engine producing 84 kW (112 hp).

The Foton Xiangling V had a cargo bed in a size of 2100mm/1560mm/360mm.

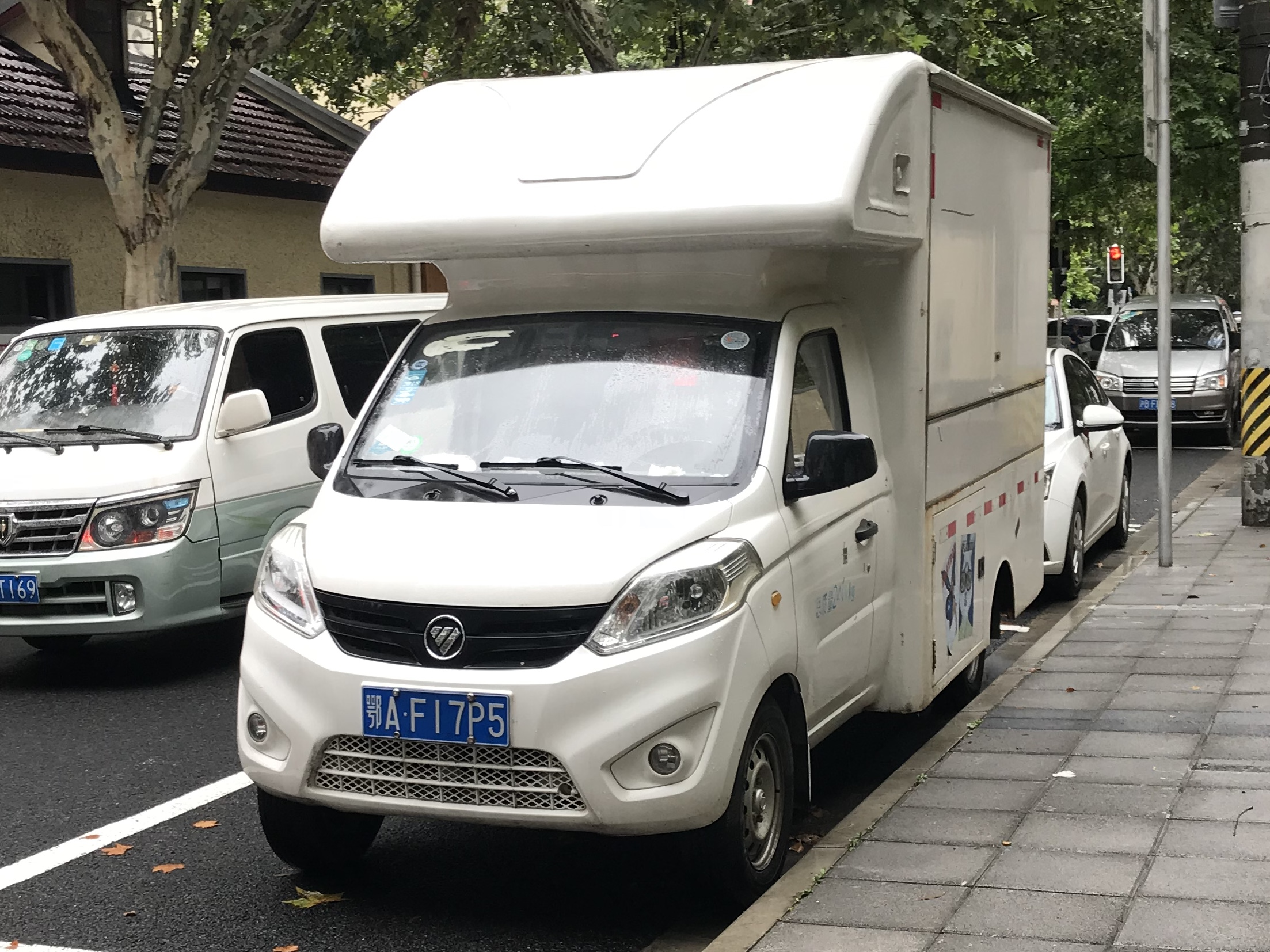
A Foton Xiangling V RV

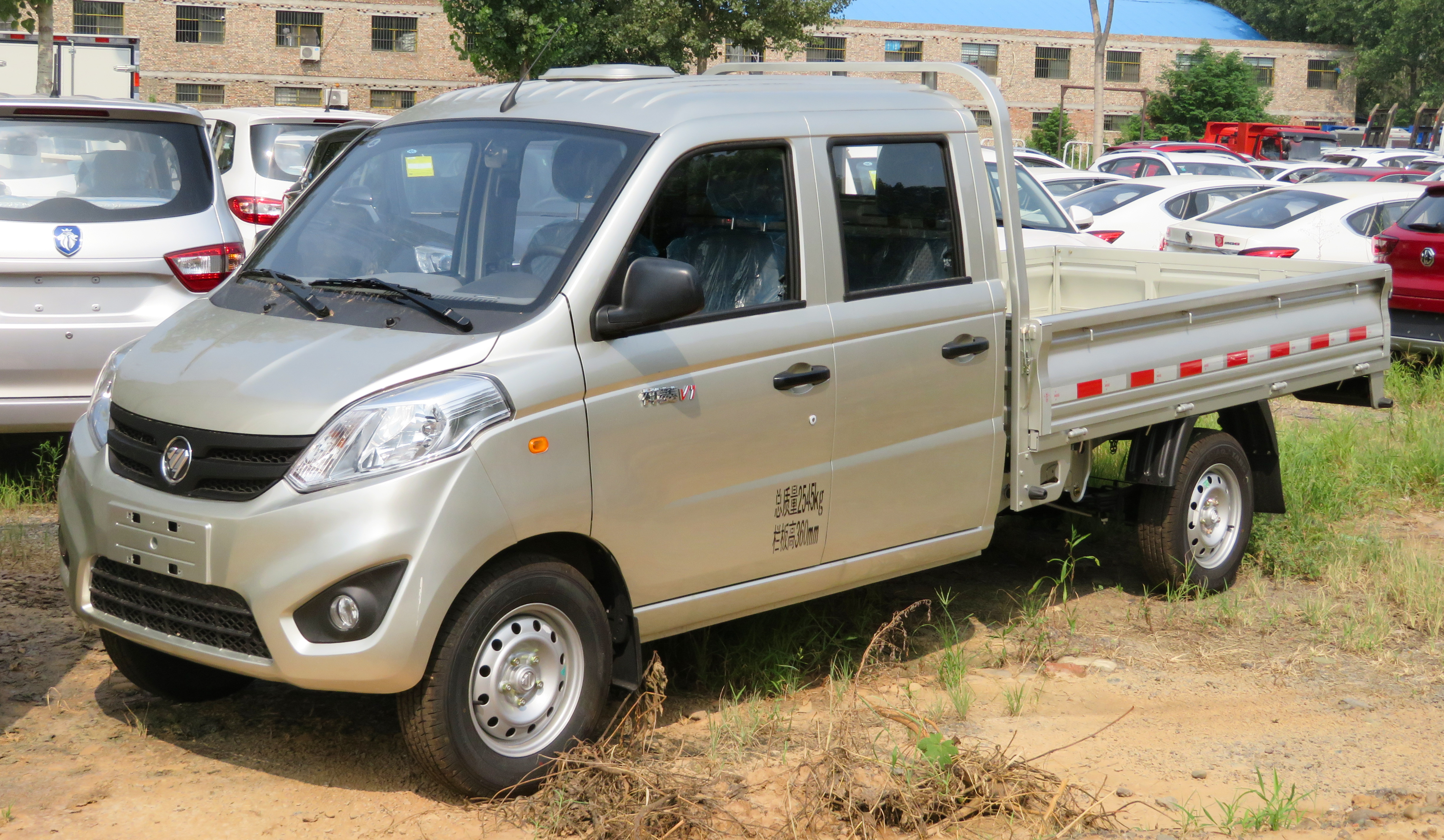
Xiangling V double cab

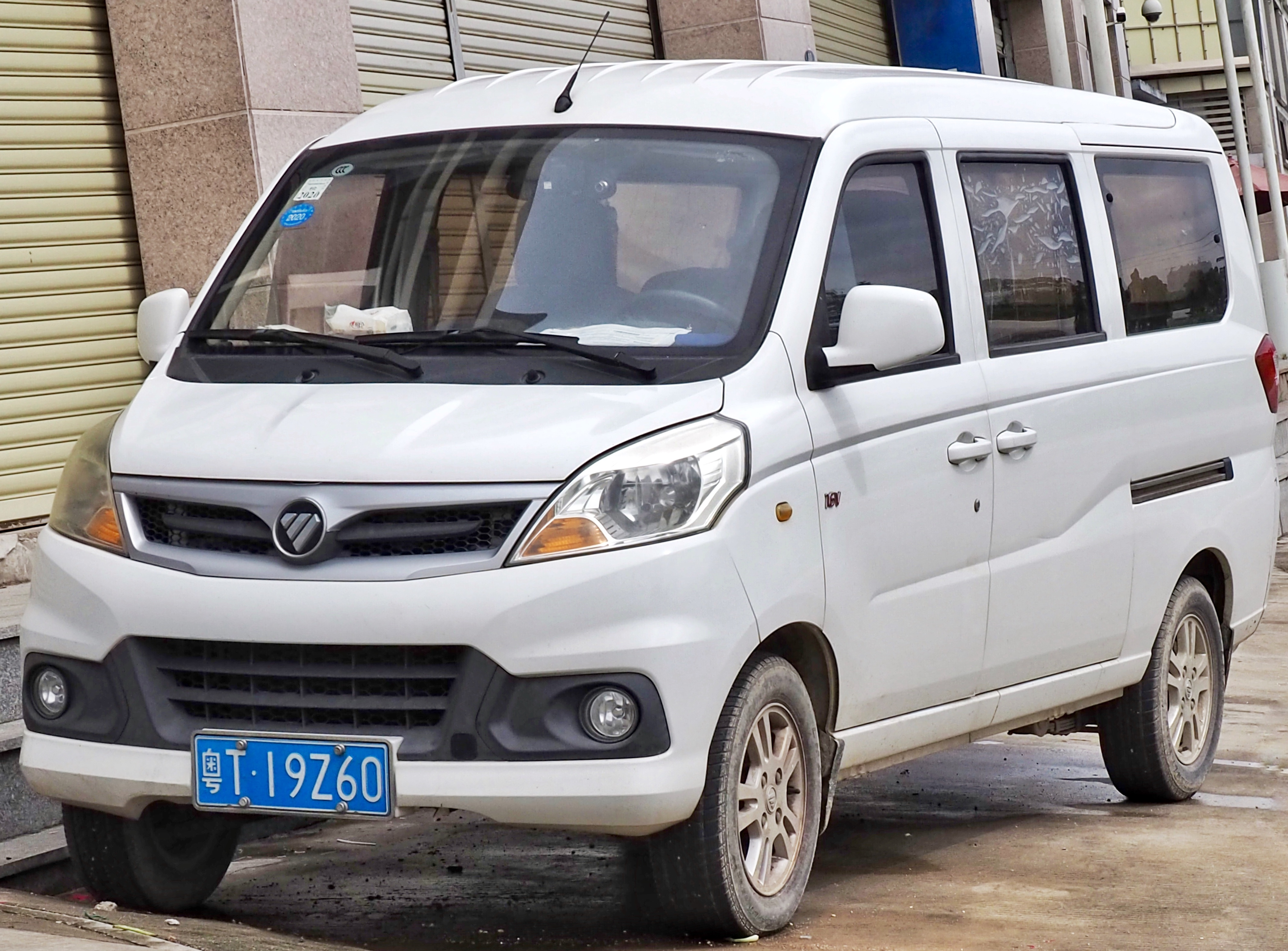
Foton Xiangling V microvan (View V5)

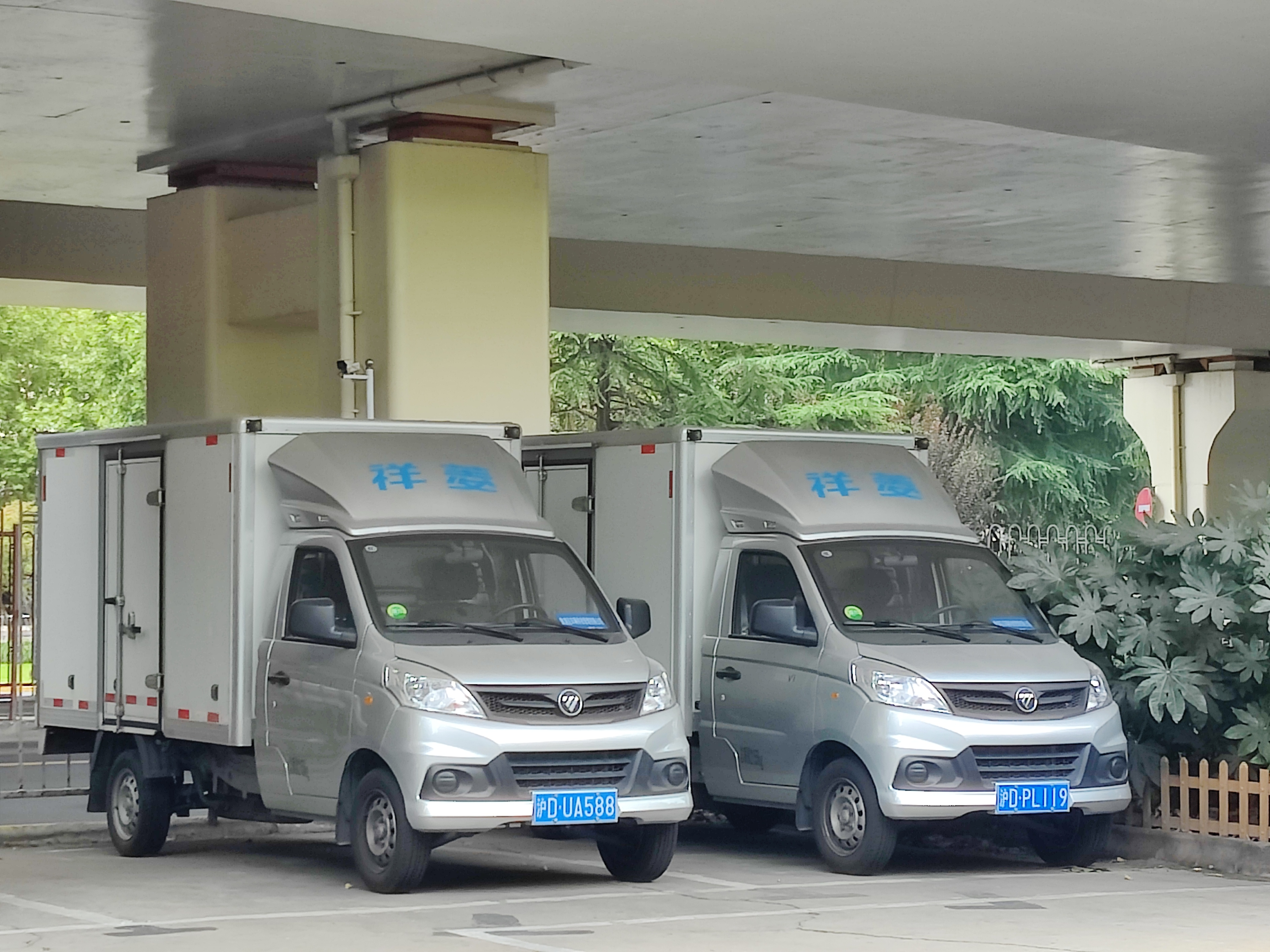
A duo of post-facelift Foton Xiangling V’s

=== Piaggio Porter (NP6) ===
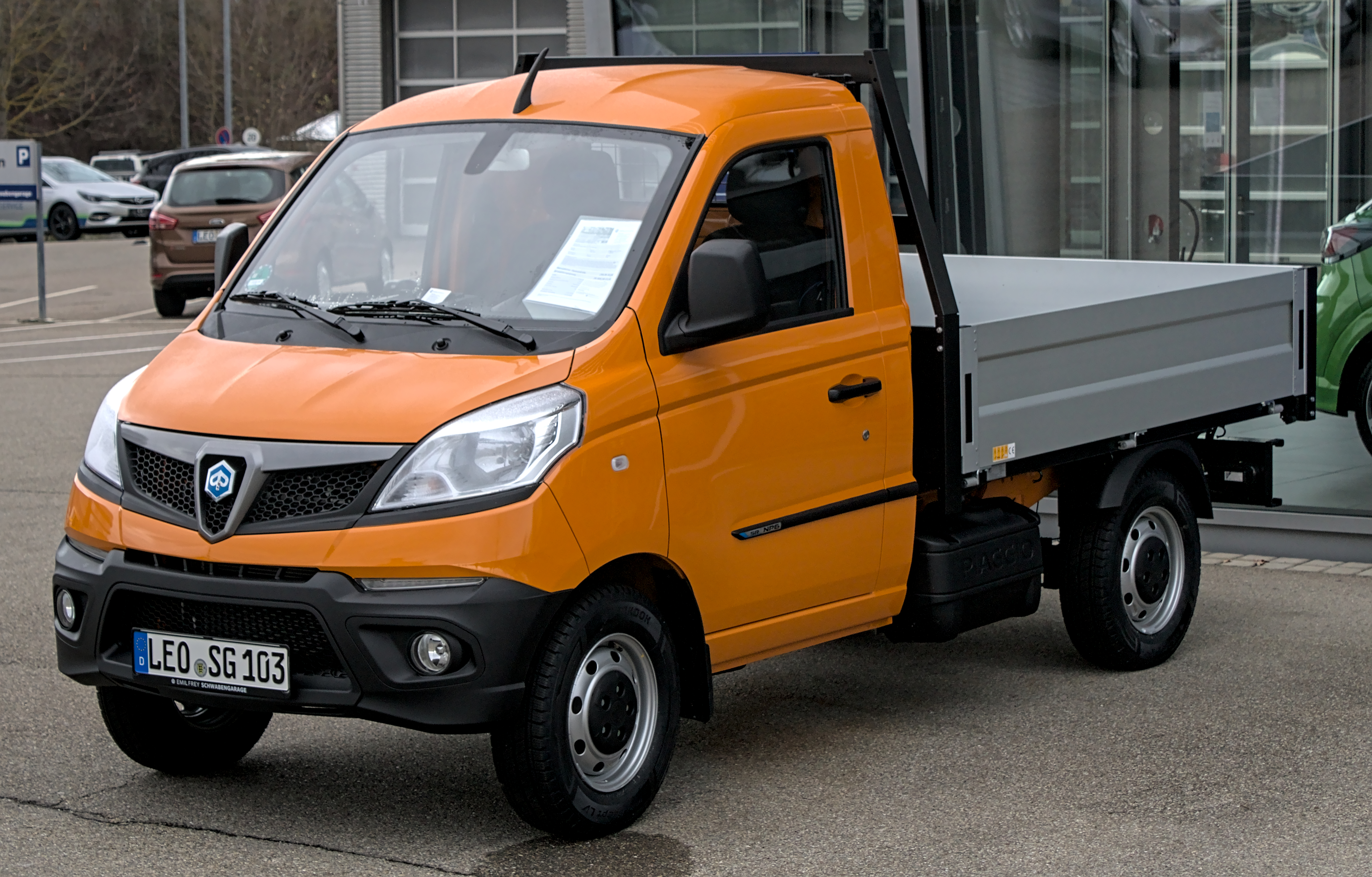
Piaggio Porter NP6.

Piaggio presented the second generation Piaggio Porter codenamed NP6 in January 2021. The new model is built together with Foton Group and is derived from the Foton Gratour V3. The main vehicle body is based on the post-facelift variant while the front bumper and grilles were completely redesigned and reengineering by Piaggio to be approved according to European emissions and safety standards. Production takes place in the Piaggio factory in Pontedera (Italy).
