= Giotti Victoria =

Italian pickup truck, van and microcars manufacturer

- Company type: Private
- Industry: Automotive
- Founded: 2007
- Headquarters: Poggibonsi, Italy
- Area served: world wide
- Products: pickup truck, van and microcars
- Revenue: € 8.780.677,00 (2022)
- Owner: Lorenzo Giotti and Federico Giotti brothers
- Number of employees: 14 (2024)
- Website: official site

Giotti Victoria is an Italian manufacturer of pickup trucks, vans, and microcars. The company also serves as an importer of cars produced by DFSK Motor, under the Glory brand.

== History ==
Giotti Victoria was founded by brothers Lorenzo and Federico Giotti in 2007. Its factory is located in Barberino Val d'Elsa, with its legal headquarters in Poggibonsi. The company also deals in used trucks, which are repaired by their in-house mechanics. Giotti Victoria is the main sponsor of the professional cycling team Giotti Victoria-Savini Due.

== Produced pickup trucks ==
The Gladiator line of pickup trucks produced by Giotti Victoria includes the Evo and Top series, which feature various models, including vans. These models include the Top 2.8, Top double cab, and Top electric.

== Produced cars ==
The cars produced by Giotti Victoria include the Giotti Victoria Ginko and Giotti Victoria Gyppo. In 2024, the SUV series, including the V5 and V6 models, entered production.

== Imported cars ==
The imported car series, named Glory, includes various models: 500, 500e, 580, and iX5.
