= Piaggio Ape =

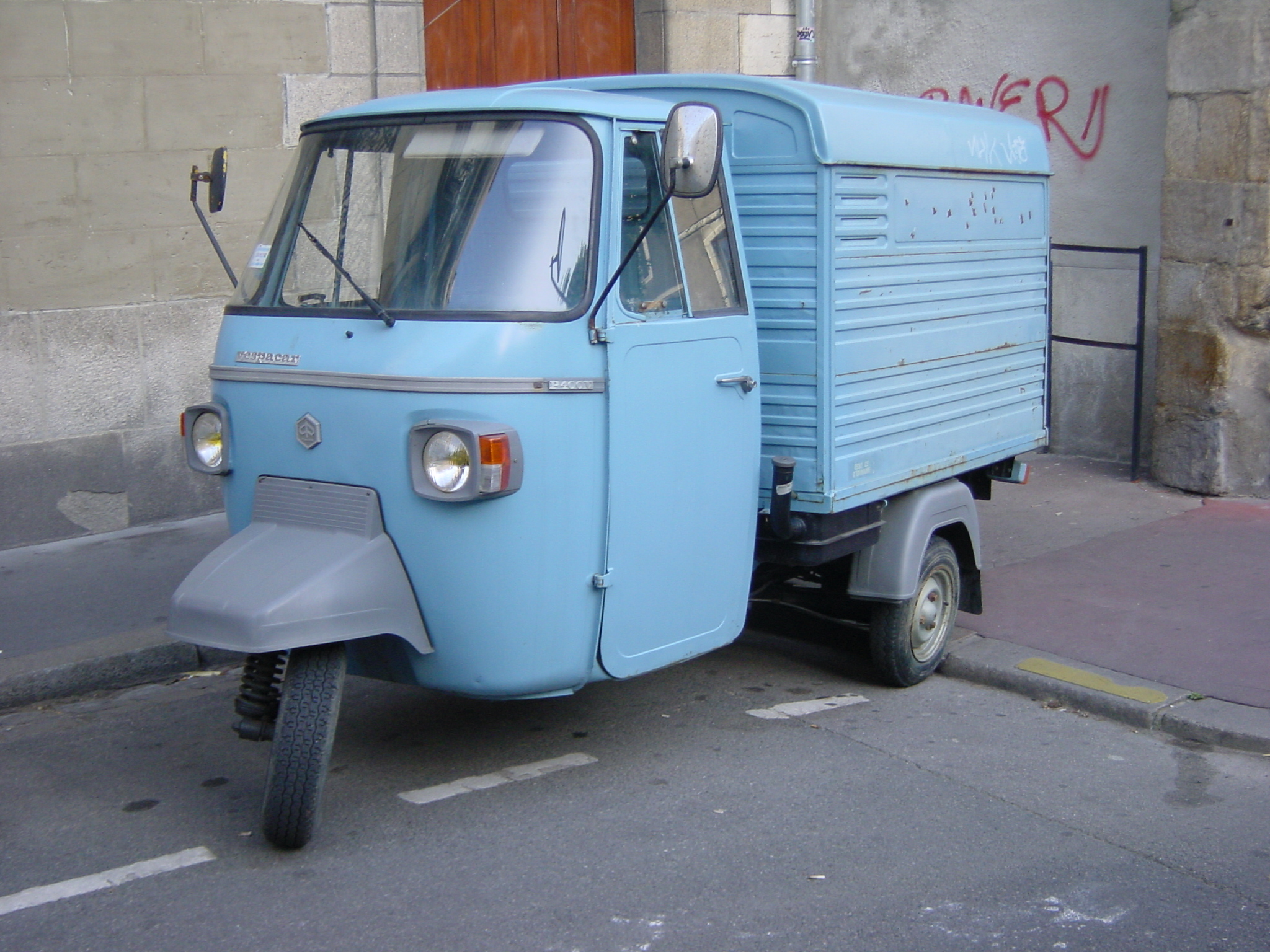

Overview
- Manufacturer: Piaggio
- Also called: VespaCar; TriVespa
- Production: 1948–present
- Assembly: Italy: Pontedera, Pisa; India: Pune, Maharashtra
- Designer: Piaggio

Body and chassis
- Class: Submicrovan
- Body style: Van, pickup, autorickshaw
- Platform: Vs67MP5

Dimensions
- Wheelbase: 159 cm (Ape 500)
- Length: 249 cm (Ape 500 short)
- Width: 126 cm (Ape 500 short)
- Height: 155 cm (Ape 500 short)

The Piaggio Ape (pronounced [ˈpjaddʒo ˈaːpe]; ape being Italian for 'bee'), initially marketed as VespaCar or TriVespa, is a three-wheeled light commercial vehicle, manufactured and marketed by Piaggio as an adaptation of the company's Vespa scooter (vespa being Italian for 'wasp'). It has been in continuous production since its 1948 introduction and is offered in numerous body configurations, serving a range of utilitarian functions.

== History and design ==
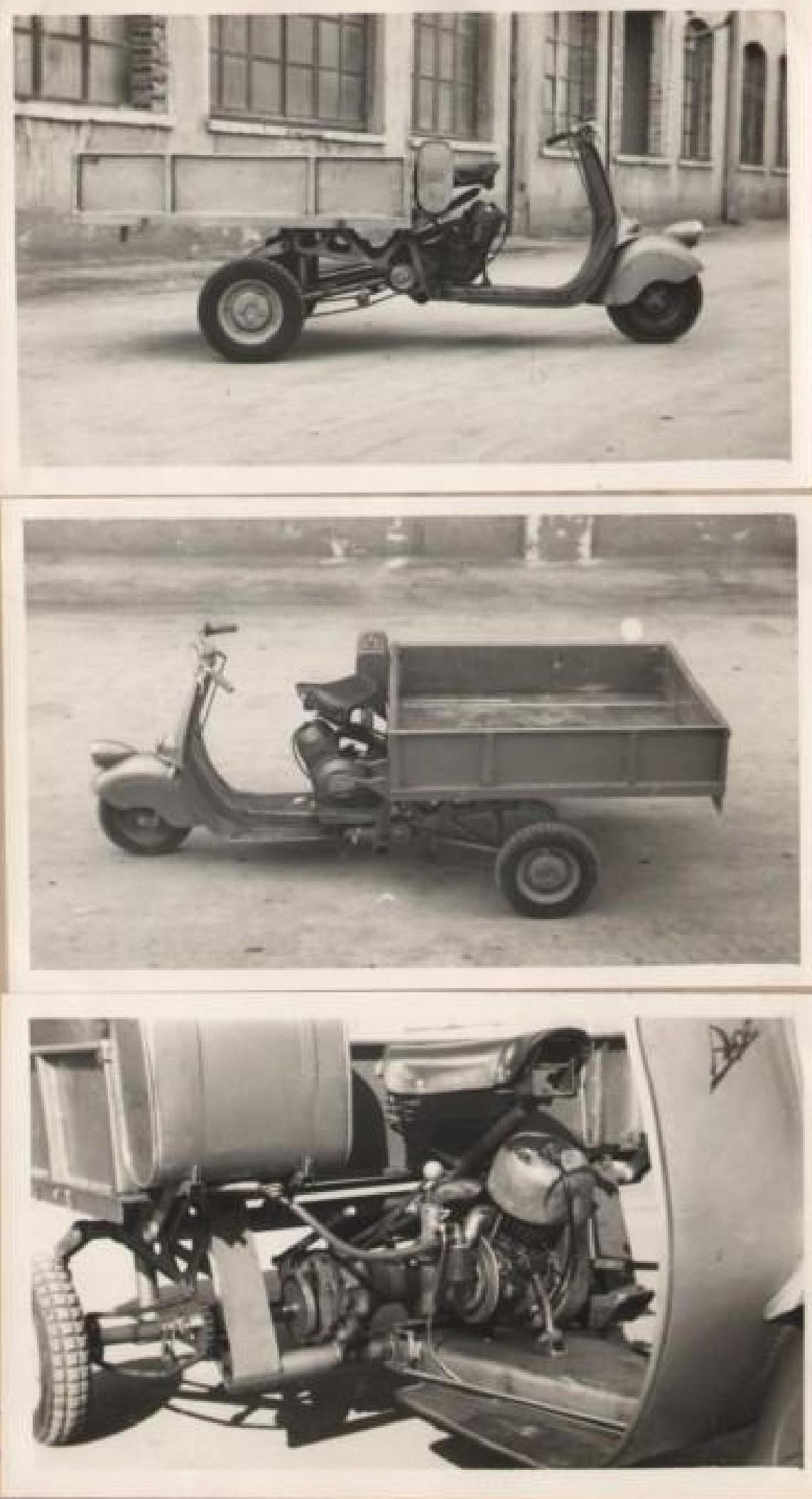
Photos from a 1948 Piaggio technical report on the Ape, showing the Ape at the 1946 Fiera di Milano/Milan Fair.

After World War II, many Italians could not afford personal transportation. In 1947, aircraft designer Corradino D'Ascanio conceived a light and simple three-wheeled commercial vehicle, which found favor with Piaggio. The first model was a cabless adaptation of the company's two-wheel scooter, the Vespa, adding two rear wheels and a flat utility bed over the rear axle.

Initial models featured 50 cc, 125 cc or 150 cc engines and, later, a 175 cc engine. By the time of the 1964 Ape D, a cab was added to protect the driver from the elements.

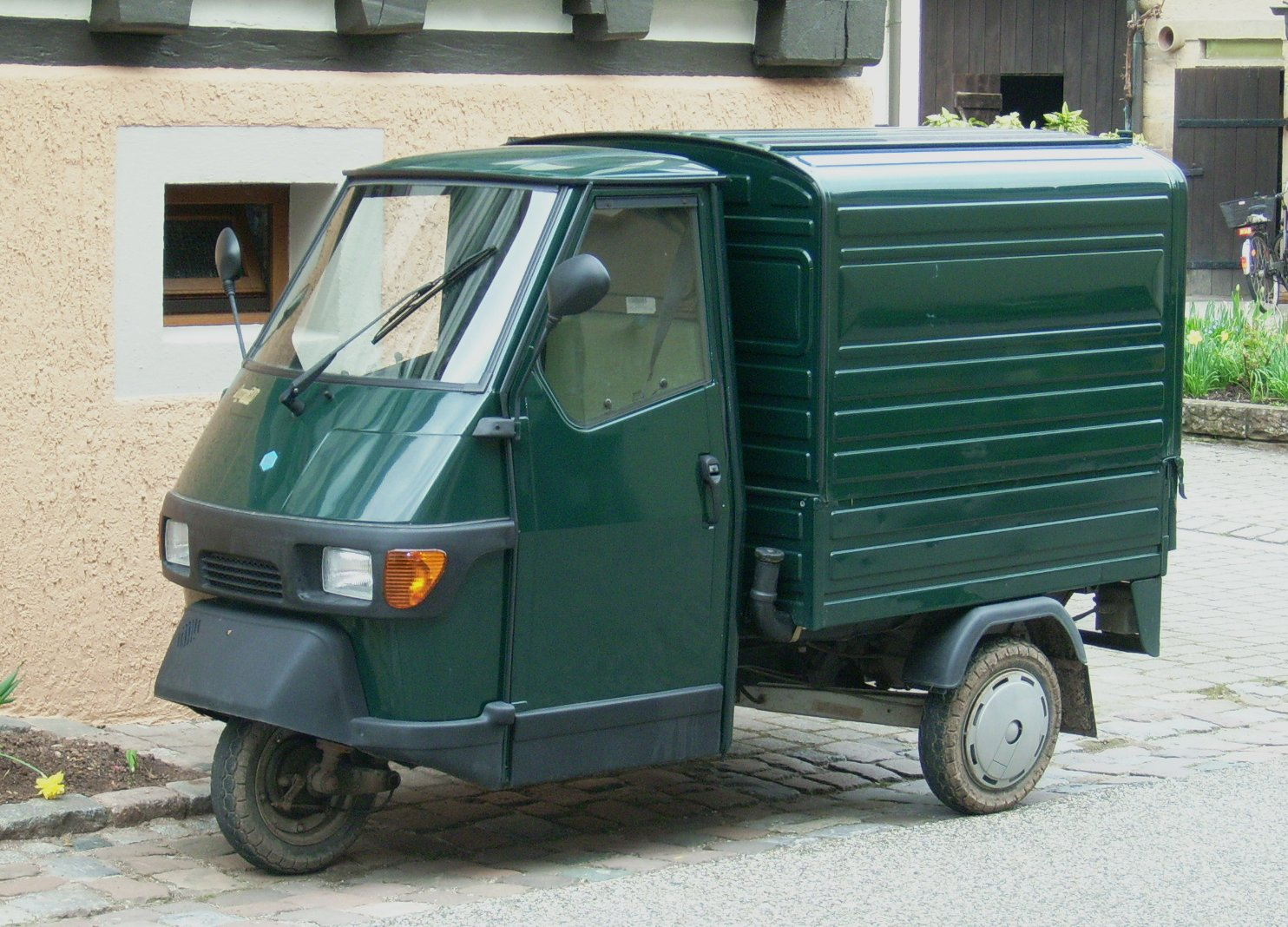
An Ape 50 van in Green Sherwood

With handlebar steering (a steering wheel became a later innovation), the original Ape was a single-seater that could provisionally accommodate two passengers of modest size. A door was provided on each side, to facilitate entry and exit. Performance was modest, suited to light delivery, with adequate torque for hills and a low top speed. On larger roads, Apes could be driven close to the curb to allow other vehicles to pass.

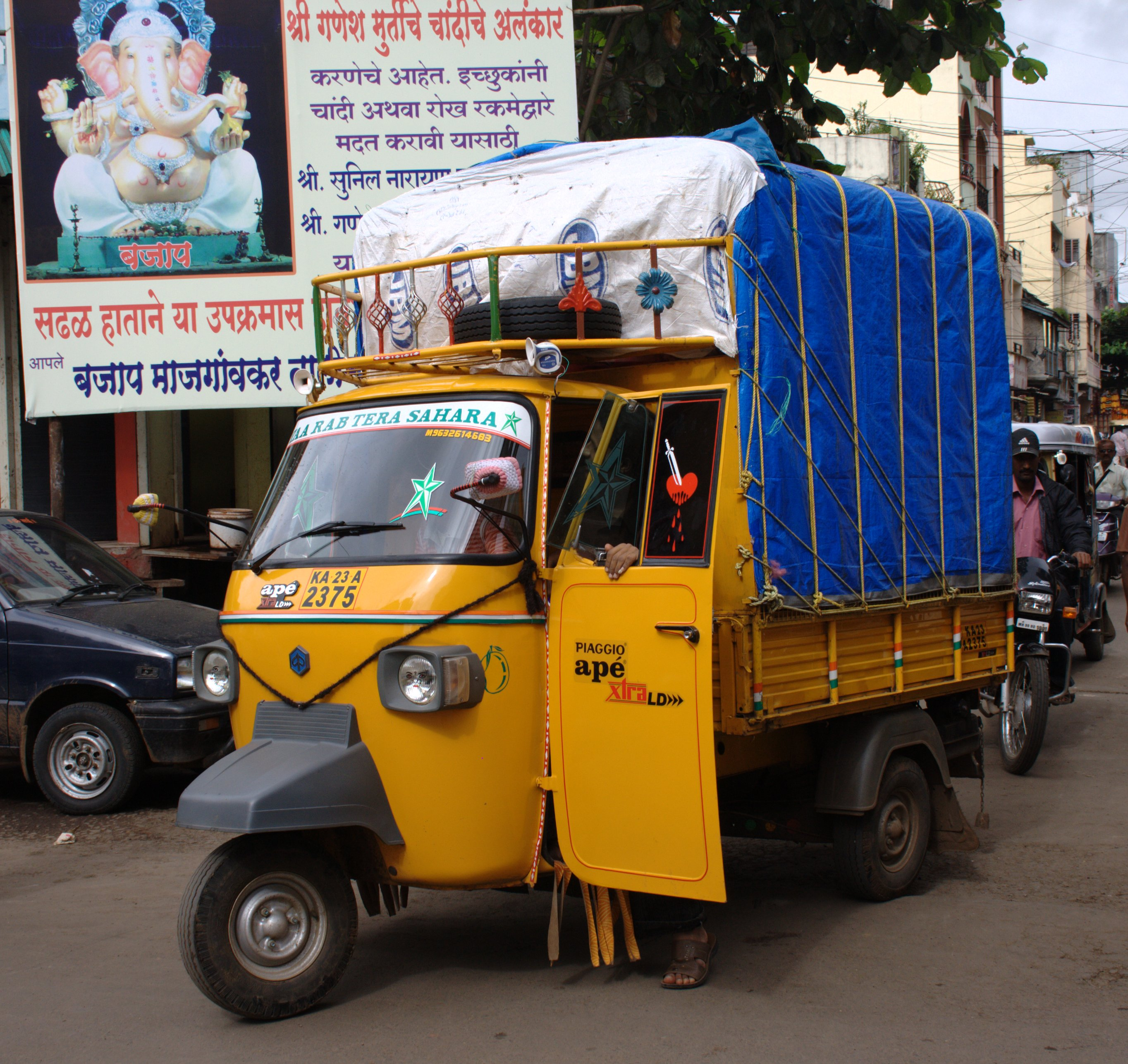
Apé Xtra LD, India 2010

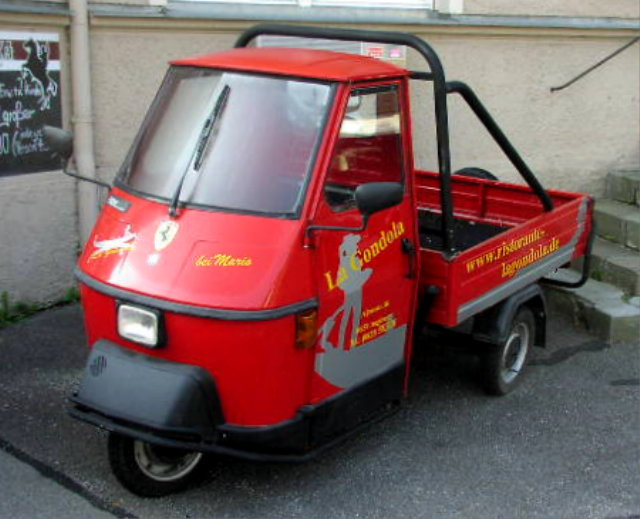
An Ape used for pizza delivery

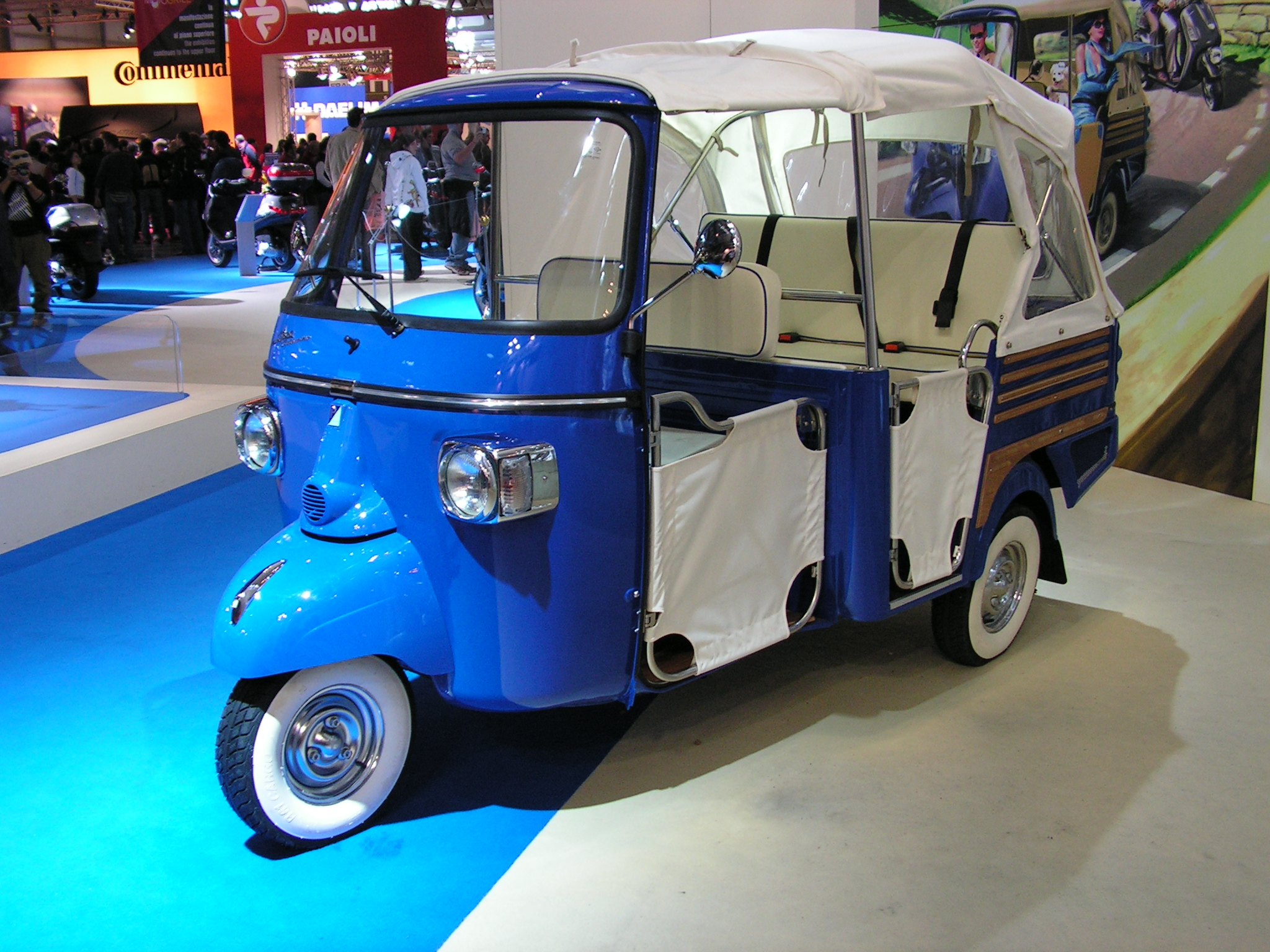
The Ape Calessino at EICMA 2007

== Usage ==
The Ape has been marketed in various configurations, including as vans and pickups for load carrying (popular with postal administration in some countries) and as an autorickshaw. More recently Piaggio has offered models such as the Ape Cross Country and the Ape Web aimed at the youth market. The Ape is also commonly used as a promotion tool, with advertising signboards mounted in the load bay.

The Ape is common in Italy where its compact size allows it to negotiate narrow streets, park easily, and serve as an impromptu market stall.

Most Apes are produced in India by Piaggio India. In India, the Ape is most commonly found in the form of an autorickshaw. A relatively small number of Apes were still made in Italy, but on 16 October 2013, Piaggio announced that Italian production of the Ape would end and construction would move entirely to India.

== Current models ==
Currently, two model ranges are offered: the "Ape 50" with a 49.8 cc petrol engine and the larger "Ape TM" which comes available with a 218 cc petrol engine or a 422 cc diesel engine.

The "Ape 50" can carry 175 to 205 kg (386 to 452 lb) while the "TM" and "Classic" can carry 700 to 805 kg (1,543 to 1,775 lb) (depending on version and engine). Fuel consumption for the current Ape 50 model is about 30 km/L (85 mpg_{‑imp}; 71 mpg_{‑US})

A limited edition named the Calessino was offered with retro styling in an autorickshaw configuration and two colors white and anniversary blue – the design evoking the Ape of the 1950s and 1960s.

A design modified for racing for the Piaggio Ape has been built. The Ape Proto is hand-made and it contains modifications to enable drifting and faster driving. It has been used in special racing competitions, like the Ape RR Show in San Marino.

== Model history ==
- 1948–1952 – Ape A: 125 cc engine, wooden pick up bed, front fork mounted to the left of the wheel hub and column mounted gear lever.
- 1952–1956 – Ape B: similar to the A model but with a 150 cc engine, a pressed steel cargo bed, front fork mounted to the right of the wheel hub and cable operated gear change.
- 1956–1967 – Ape C: Still sporting a 150 cc engine but with a major redesign: the first Ape with an enclosed cab, the engine uses a 5% oil mix and is sited under the driver's seat. It was still manually started, but electric start was optional.
- 1964–1967 – Ape D: 175cc engine. Featured a trapezoidal headlight fitted on the bulkhead rather than the mudguard and an intake valve that allowed the engine to run with a 2% oil mix. The first Ape with cab heater.
- 1965–1973 – Ape E: Identical to the D model but with a 150 cc engine.
- 1968–1978 – Ape MP: MP stood for Motore Posteriore (Rear Engine), the engine was moved from the cab to the rear to improve comfort.
- 1970–1978 – Ape E/400R: 175 cc engine and minor changes.
- 1979–1981 – Ape P: 175 cc, with minor changes.
- 1981–1993 – Ape 500: 175 cc, new front with two headlights on each side.
- 1994–1999 – Ape Web & Ape Cross: 49.8 cc engine, redesigned front and rear headlights, roll-bar.
- since 1982 – Ape TM: 218 cc petrol and 422 cc diesel variants. Available with handlebar or steering-wheel. Maximum speed for the petrol version is 60 km/h, 63 km/h for the diesel version.
- since 1996 – Ape 50: 49.8 cc, redesign of the headlights incorporating side lights.
- since 1996 – Ape Furgone 50: van version of the Ape 50.
- since 2000 – Ape Cross Country 50: sport-look restyling of preceding Ape 50.
- since 2006 – Ape Classic: built also in India with a Lombardini 422 cc Diesel engine.
- 2007–2009 – Ape Calessino: limited edition models built in Italy by Piaggio with a Lombardini 422 cc Diesel engine (999 in blue produced between 2007 and 2009 then 600 in white produced from 2009) plus an Electric LV zero-emission model (100 in white produced in 2009)
- 2013–present – Ape Calessino 200: a smaller Calessino model with a 200cc petrol engine (currently in ongoing unlimited production)
- 2013–present – Ape Classic 400: a flat bed pick up truck with drop down sides; with a 435cc diesel engine by Greaves Cotton, manufactured in India and homologated for the European market; single seat; electric heater as standard.

== Special variants ==
- 1960–1968 – Ape Pentarò: standard Ape with a semi-trailer.
- 1993–2005 – Ape Poker: four-wheel version of the Ape TM, with the same engine.

== Gallery ==
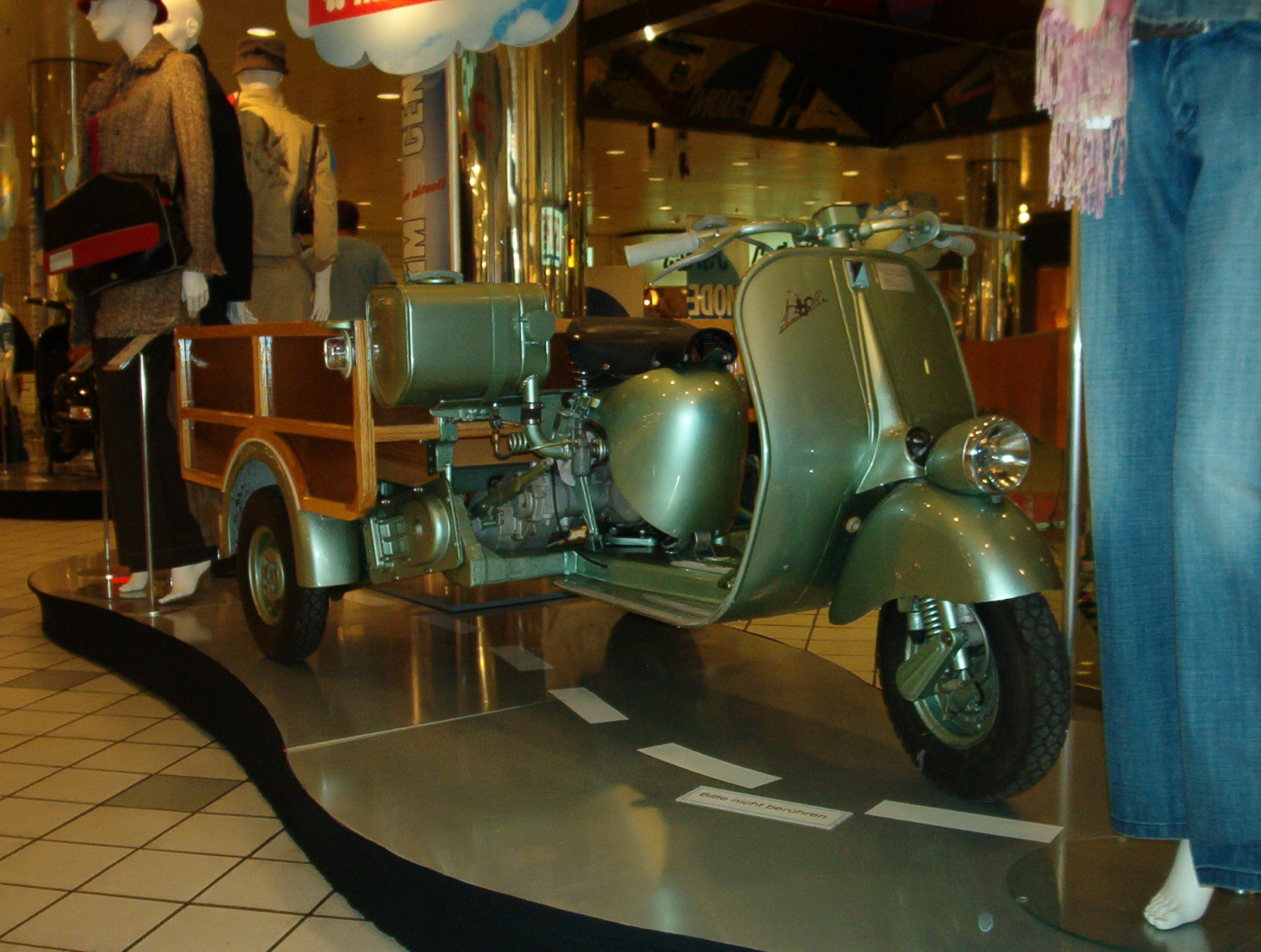
Ape B with wooden bed

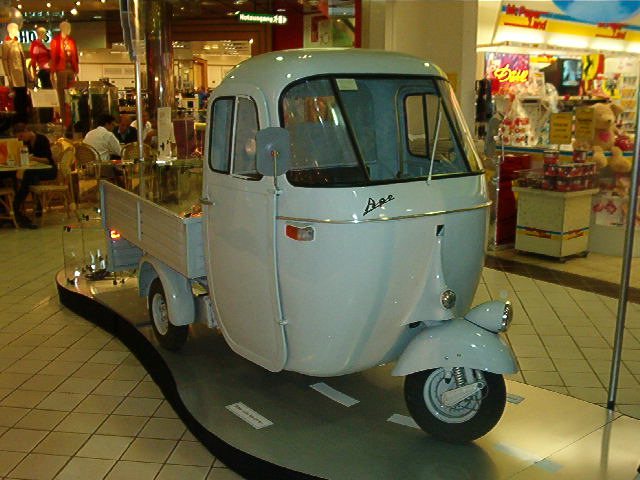
Ape C

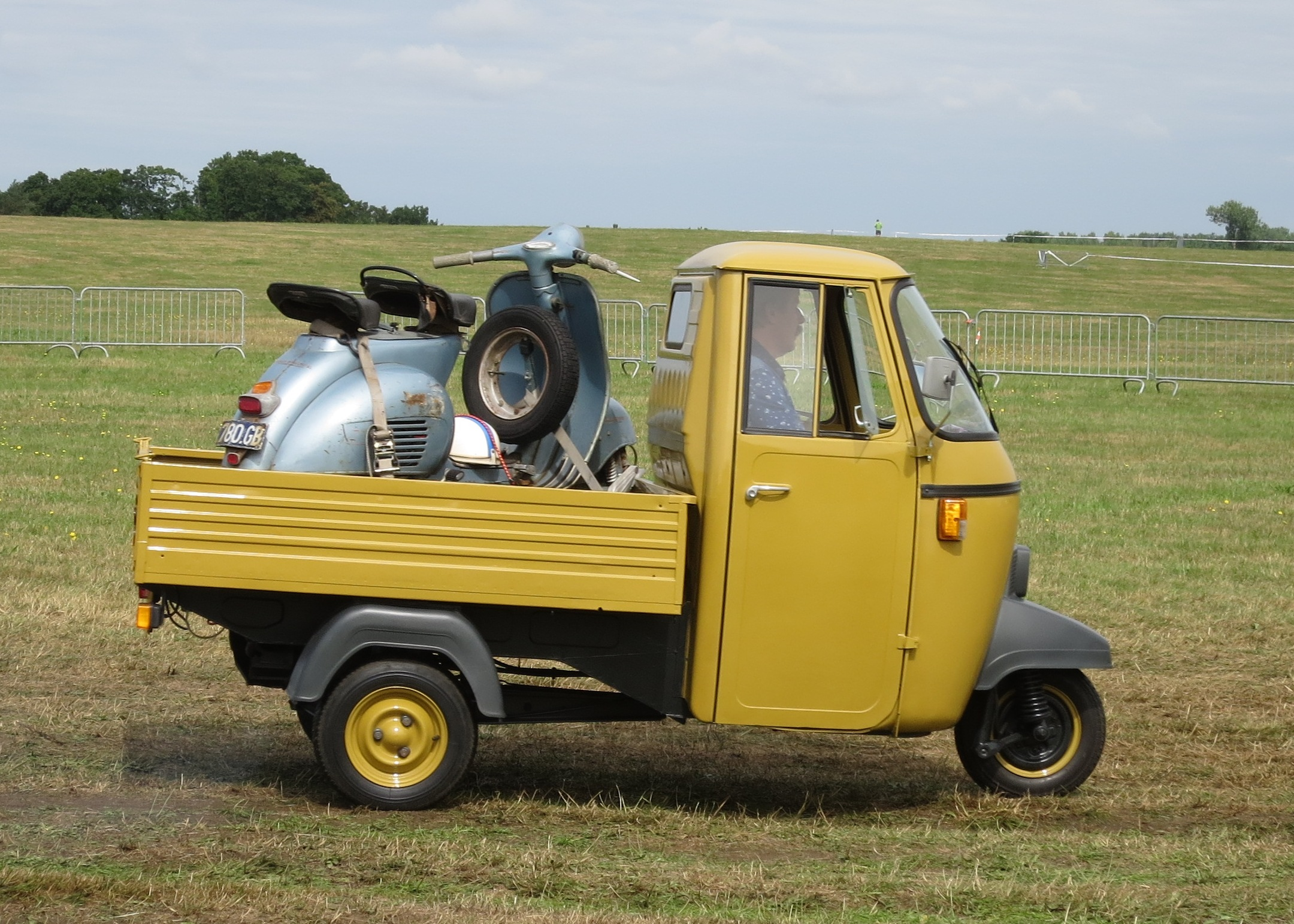
Ape P501 in profile (with a Vespa as the load)

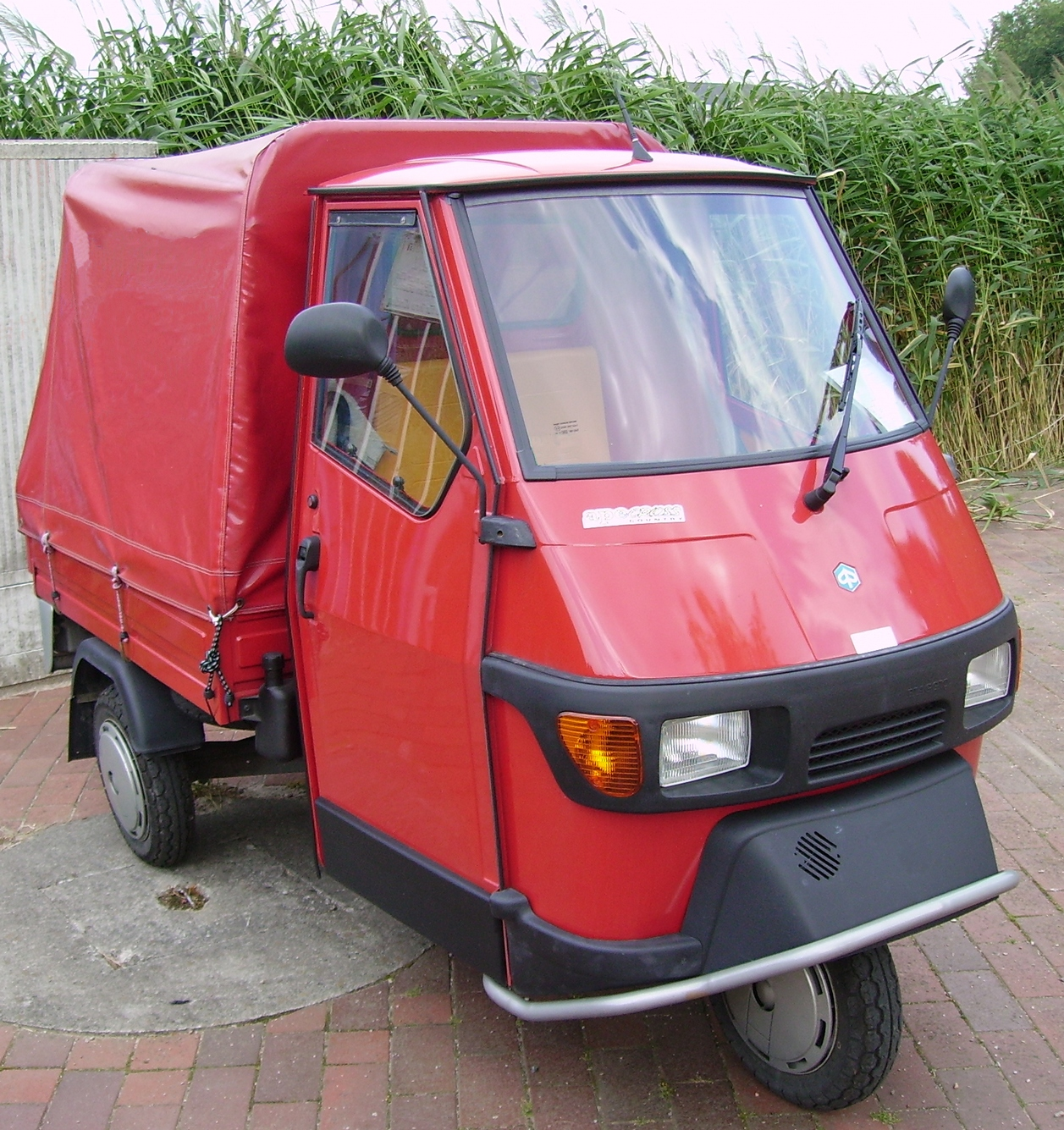
Ape Cross Country

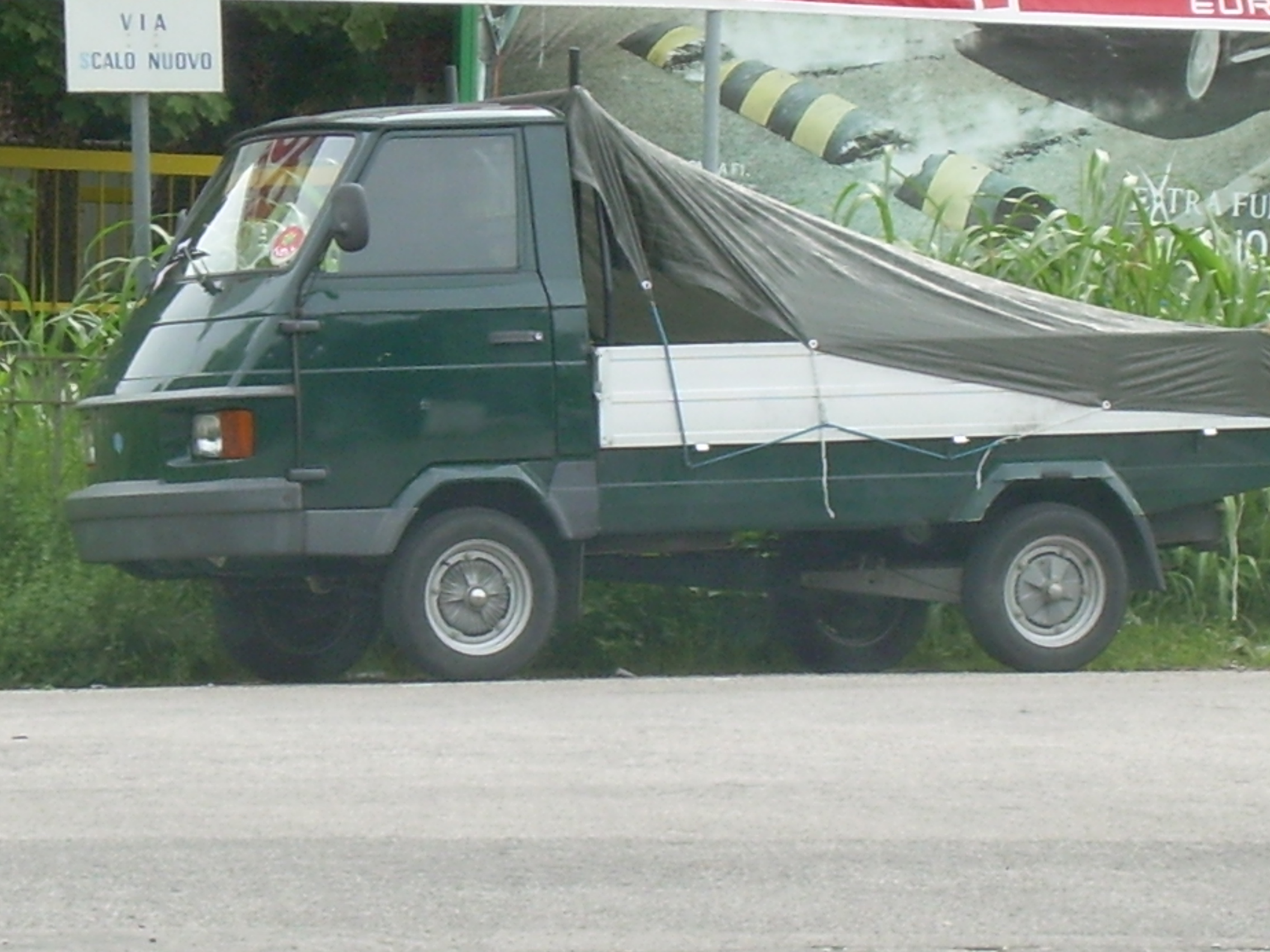
Ape Poker

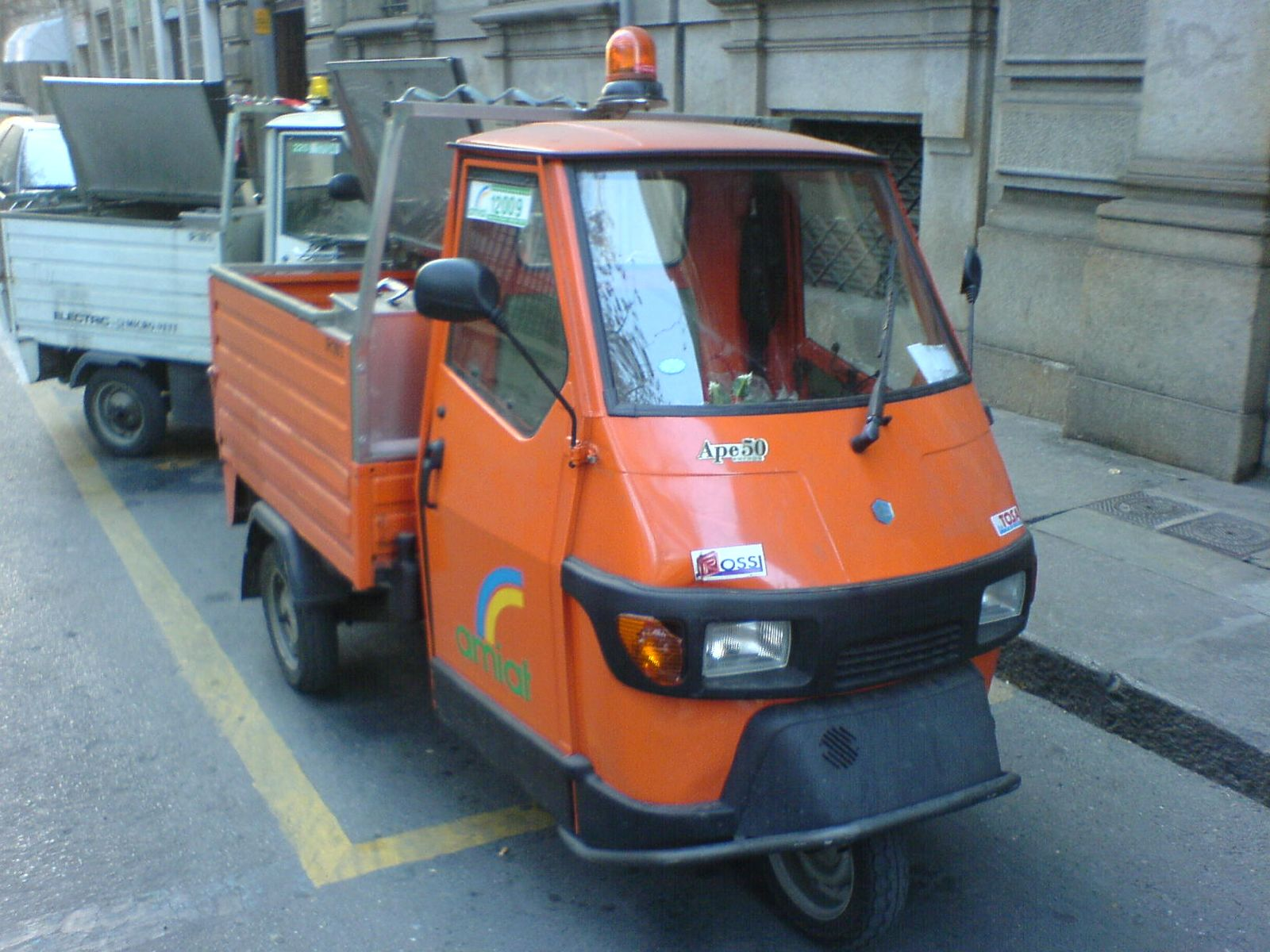
Ape 50 used as a garbage truck

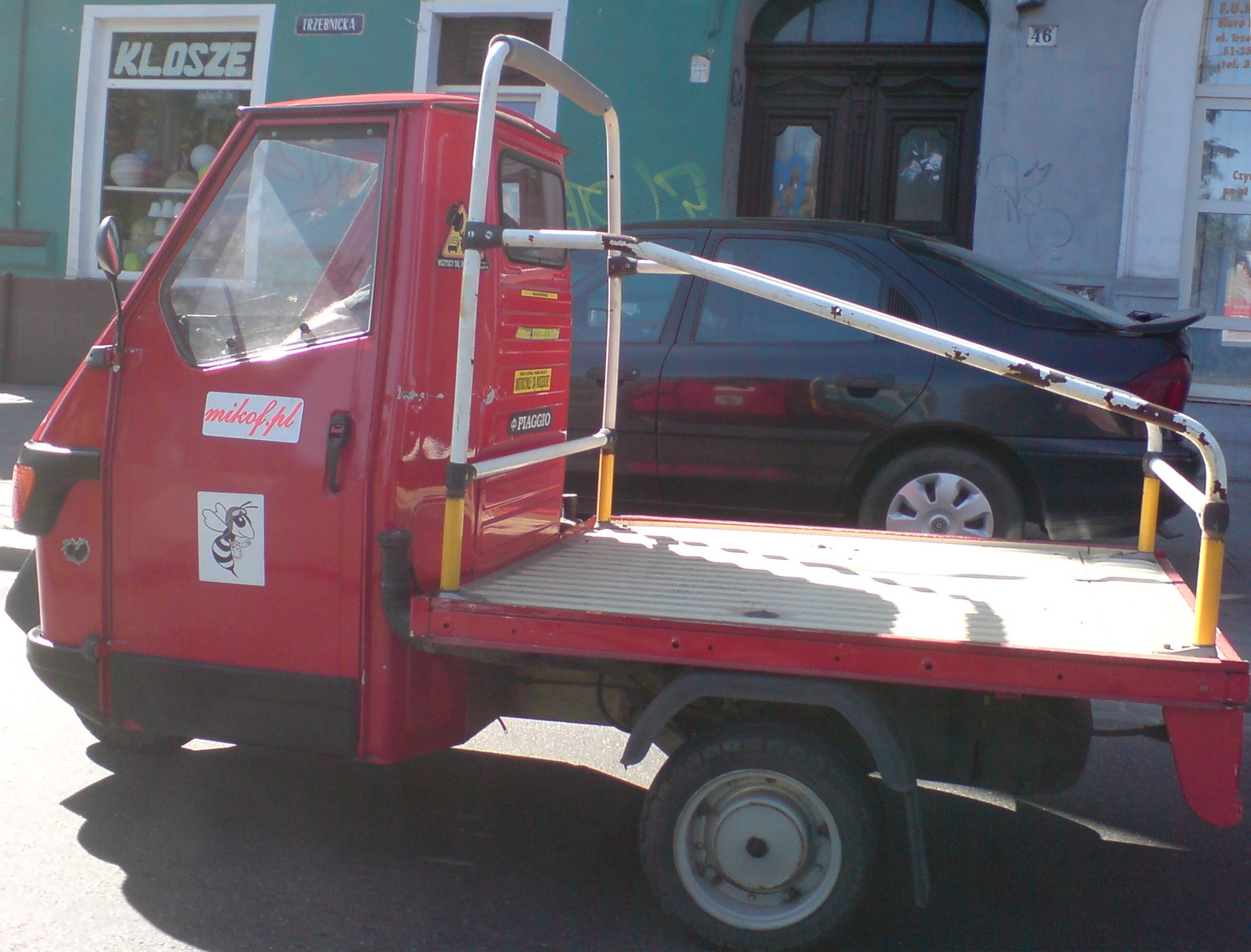

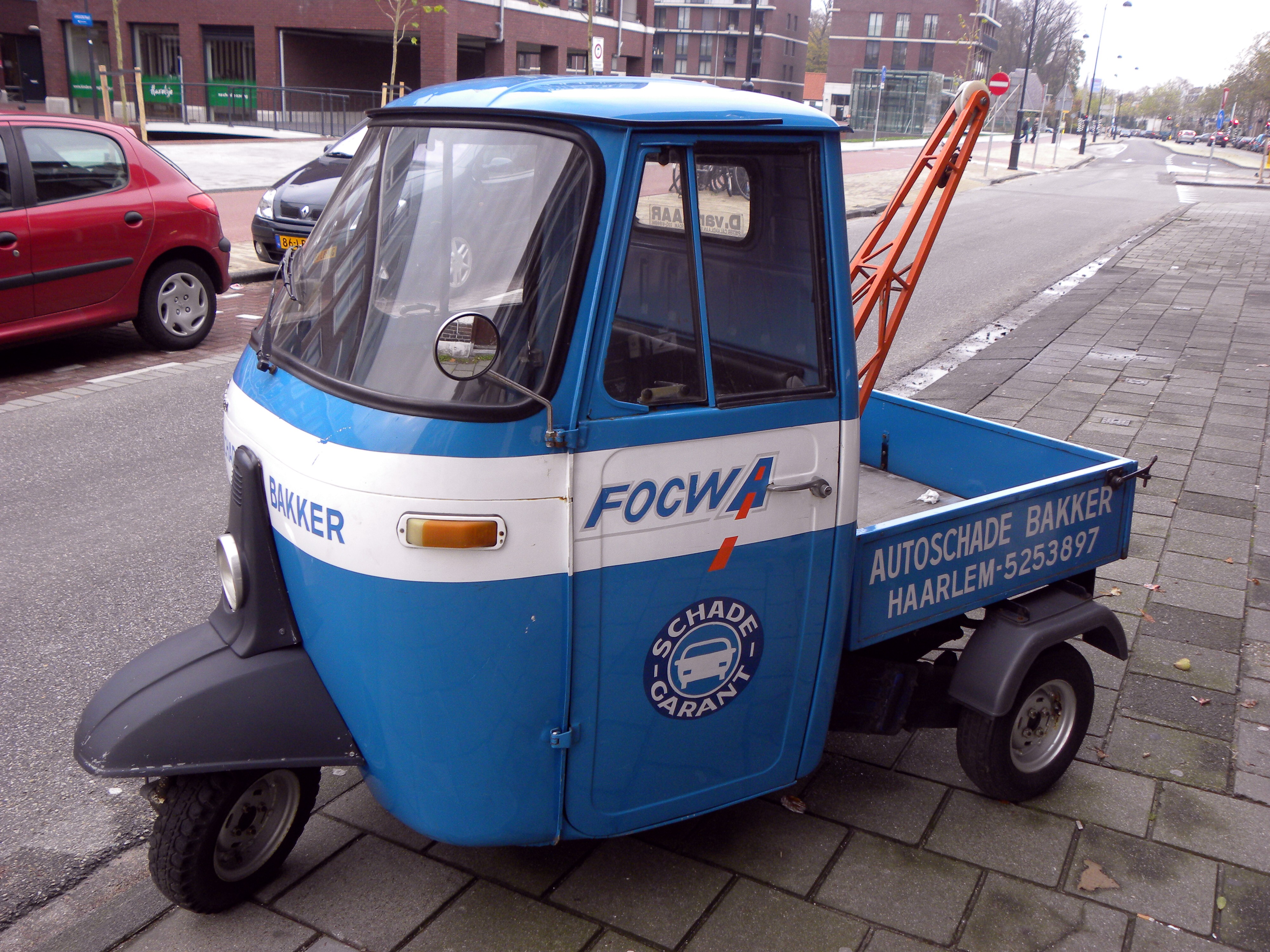

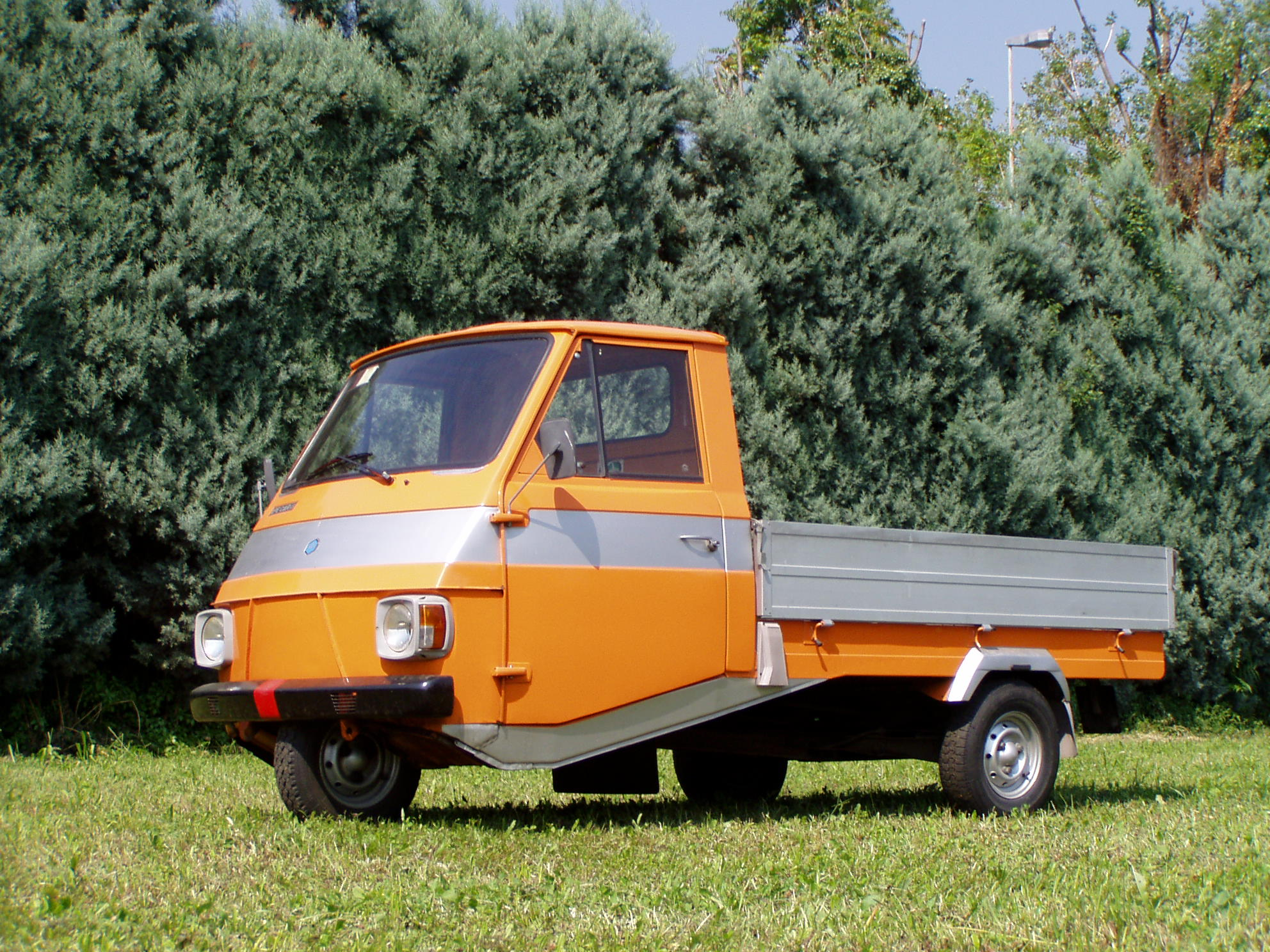
1977 Apecar LS

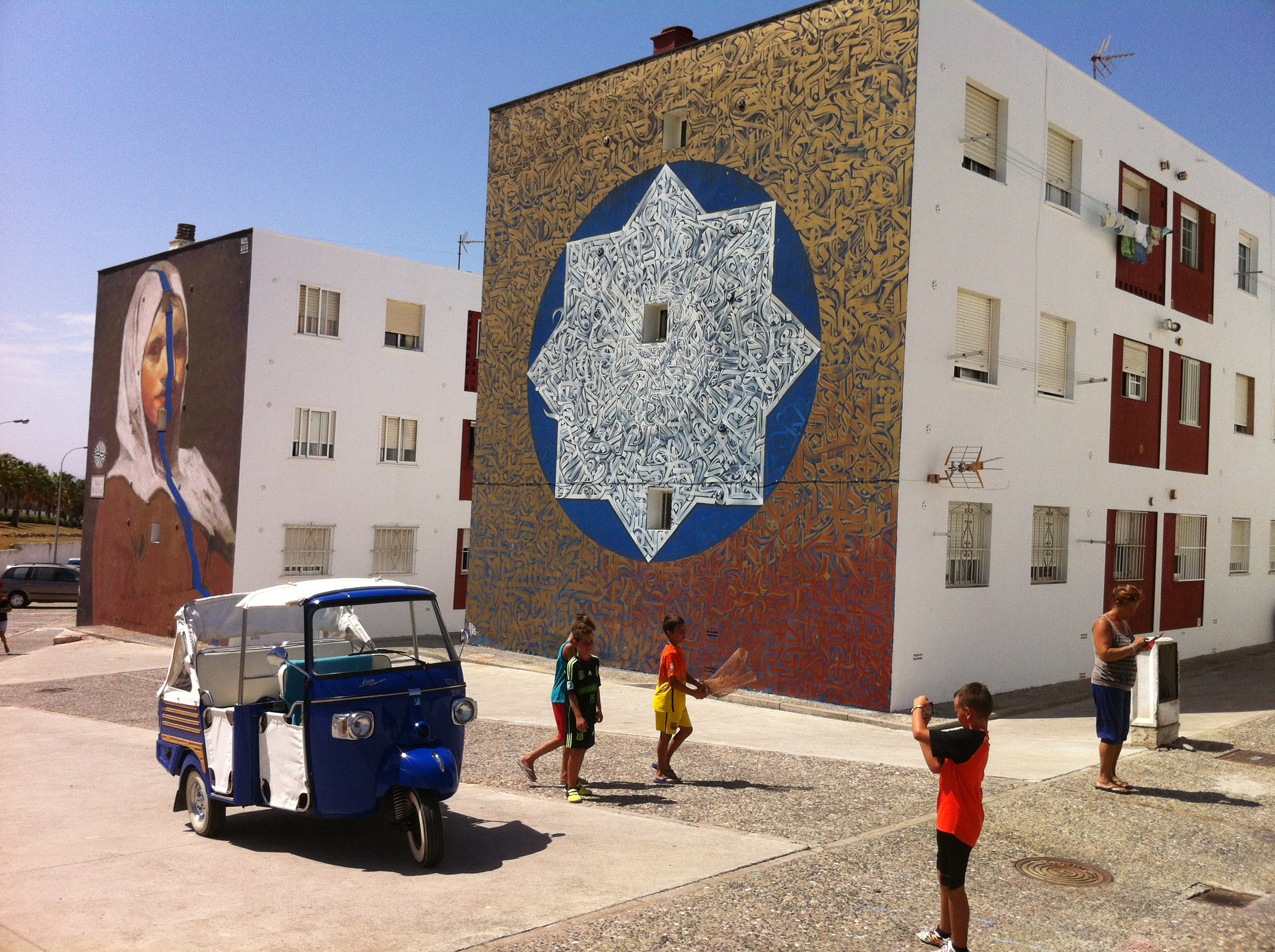
Ape Calessino (2007 model)

== See also ==
- List of motorized trikes
