= Lombardini (company) =

Italian diesel engine manufacturer

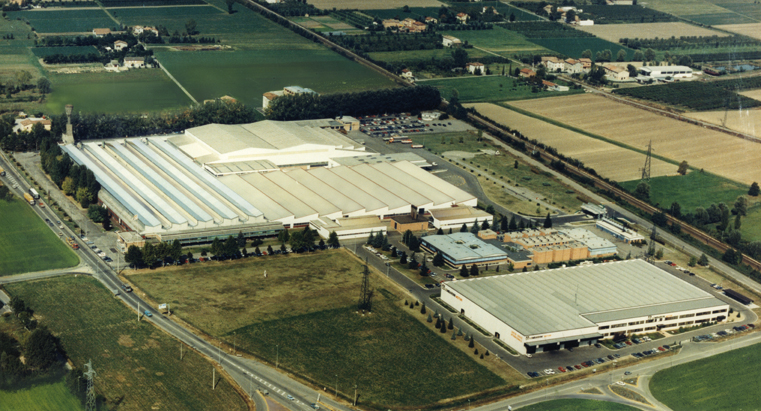
Lombardini

Lombardini Srl was an Italian manufacturer of diesel engines up to 134HP, which is now part of American manufacturer Kohler Co. after acquisition. The company was founded in Reggio Emilia by brothers Adelmo and Rainero Lombardini in 1933 under the name of "Lombardini Fabbrica Italiana Motori S.p.A.". Adelmo Lombardini had already been manufacturing combustion engines since 1922 with a company called "Società Anonima Cooperativa Metallurgica" in Novellara (RE).

Along with engines, the company of the two Lombardini brothers manufactured finished products such as pumping sets. After World War II this trend increased with production of agricultural tractors and tillers.

== History ==
In 1963 a new premise was built in the outskirts of Reggio Emilia which marked the transition to large scale production. Taking advantage of the tumultuous growth of the Italian economy and of the ever-increasing demand for agricultural machinery, Lombardini enjoyed a long and steady expansion, resulting in the company becoming a leader in small agricultural equipment. At this stage, the company decided to abandon production of finished products in order to focus on bare engines alone. This change reflected a strategic decision of the company not to compete against their own customers.

During the years Lombardini became the most prominent Diesel manufacturer in Italy in its range and bought out its competitors one by one. Slanzi, Cotiemme, Acme and lastly Ruggerini company were all bought out and incorporated into Lombardini.

As the growth of the company went on, its structure became more and more that of a modern industrial group. Commercial branches were established in the UK, Spain, France, Germany and US. Aside from the main premises in Reggio Emilia, new factories were established in Rieti (Italy), Czech Republic and India.

In 1999 Lombardini was sold to Mark IV Industries; shortly thereafter they took over their long-time competitor Ruggerini Motori. In 2007, Lombardini was sold to the American Kohler Company becoming part of its Power Group.

== Products ==
Lombardini manufactures air- and liquid-cooled Diesel engines. It also has a small range of gasoline engines (petrol).

=== Air-cooled diesel engines ===
- The Lombardini single-cylinder air-cooled engines are a classic. Old 3LD and 6LD have been sold for decades to the five continents and still today continue to power tillers and other application.
- 15LD family is the latest single-cylinder Lombardini manufactures. It goes from 220 to 500 cc and from 3.7 to 12HP.
- Twin-cylinder and three-cylinder engines are also available to reach a power output of 37HP.

=== Liquid-cooled diesel engines ===
Liquid-cooled Lombardini engines range from 440 to 2200 cc and from 11 to 65HP. They come as twin-, three- or four-cylinder. Lombardini has engineered a 440cc engine with common rail, which is today the smallest common rail in the world.

=== Gasoline engines ===
The range of Lombardini gasoline engines has shrunk in the years. Today only two models of gasoline are available, known as Intermotor's: a 9 and an 11 HP. One of those is the IM350, often called "The world's best engine". Also, a liquid-cooled gasoline engine of 20HP remains in production. Lombardini, being part of Kohler group, is now marketing the Kohler gasoline engines which range from 4 to 40HP and come in a variety of models and configurations.

== Applications ==
=== Construction industry ===
The construction industry is the second field of application of Lombardini engines. Machinery such as trench rollers, reversible compactors, single drum rollers, vibratory plates, mini rollers etc, are an example of that. Some major European OEMs have some Lombardini in their products.

=== Automotive ===
This is one of the latest market Lombardini has entered. It includes Micro cars (Ligier, Chatenet, Giotti Victoria etc.), quads, ATVs, 3-wheelers, and similar. For this market, Lombardini has engineered a special 440 cc engine with common rail injection, the CT Move launched in 2006.

=== Other ===
Other applications include Gensets and welders, tower lights, sweepers, high pressure cleaners, pumping sets, cranes, aerial platform and so on.

== Licenses ==
During the years Lombardini has had license agreements with companies in different countries. Such agreements allowed a local manufacturer to assemble Lombardini engines for its local market under the direct supervision of Lombardini. All such agreements are now expired and nobody is currently authorised to assemble engines under the Lombardini brand except Lombardini itself. Lombardini is also no longer involved in ensuring the quality of such productions and where they continue the engines can not be considered genuine Lombardini engines.

== See also ==
- List of Italian companies
- List of tractor manufacturers
- List of former tractor manufacturers
- Construction equipment
