= Jiao (surname) =

Jiāo (焦) is a Chinese surname. Its Wade-Giles romanization and Cantonese pronunciation are Chiao.

== Notable people ==
- Deserts Chang (born Chiao An-pu; 焦安溥; 1981), Taiwanese singer-songwriter
- Jiao Bingzhen (焦秉贞), Qing Dynasty painter and astronomer
- Jiao Fengbo (焦凤波; born 1983), Chinese former footballer
- Jiao Guobiao (焦国标; born 1963), Chinese dissident
- Jiao Hong (焦竑; 1540–1620), Ming Dynasty philosopher and historian
- Jiao Huafeng (焦华峰; born 1981), Chinese Greco-Roman wrestler
- Jiao Huancheng (焦焕成; born 1949), Chinese politician
- Jiao Huang (焦晃; born 1936), Chinese actor
- Jiao Junyan (焦俊艳; born 1987), Chinese actress
- Jiao Juyin (焦菊隐; 1905–1975), Chinese director, translator, theater theorist
- Jiao Lansheng (焦兰生; born 1962), Chinese former politician
- Leroy Chiao (焦立中; born 1960), American chemical engineer and retired NASA astronaut
- Jiao Li (焦利; born 1955), former president of China Central Television
- Jiao Liuyang (焦刘洋; born 1991), Chinese swimmer
- Peggy Chiao (焦雄屏; born 1953), Taiwanese-Chinese filmmaker and producer
- Jiao Ruoyu (焦若愚; 1915–2020), Chinese politician and diplomat
- Jiao Shuai (焦帥; born 1984), Chinese retired volleyball player
- Vincent Chiao (焦恩俊; born 1967), Taiwanese actor and singer
- Jiao Xian (焦先), Han Dynasty hermit
- Jiao Xiaoping (焦小平; born 1966), Chinese former financial expert and politician
- Jiao Yu (焦玉), Ming Dynasty military general, philosopher, writer
- Jiao Yulu (焦裕禄; 1922–1964), Chinese politician
- Jiao Zhimin (焦志敏; born 1963), Chinese-born naturalized-South Korean former table tennis player, Olympic silver medalist
- Jiao (焦; born 1987), the accused in the Nanjing Sister Hong incident, identified only by surname

=== Fictional characters ===
- Jiao Ting (焦挺), a character in the Water Margin

== See also ==
- Chiao (disambiguation)
