= Ciao (disambiguation) =

Ciao is an informal Italian verbal salutation or greeting.

Ciao may also refer to:

- Ciao (programming language)
- Ciao (film), a 2008 film by Yen Tan
- Ciao! (Mauro Scocco album) (1992)
- Ciao! (Tiga album) (2009)
- Ciao (magazine), a girls' anime and manga magazine published by Shogakukan
- Ciao (website), an e-commerce site
- Piaggio Ciao, a motorbike produced by Piaggio
- "Ciao!" (song), by Lush (1996)
- "Ciao" (The White Lotus), a 2022 TV episode
- Ciao, the 1990 FIFA World Cup mascot

== See also ==
- CIAO (disambiguation)
- Chiao (disambiguation)
- Ciao Ciao (disambiguation)
