= Wei Weihan =

Chinese former politician

- 危伟汉

Mayor of Zhongshan
- In office November 2018 – June 2021
- Party Secretary: Chen Xudong; Lai Zehua
- Preceded by: Jiao Lansheng
- Succeeded by: Xiao Zhanxin

Personal details
- Born: July 1965 (age 61) Guangzhou, Guangdong, China
- Party: Chinese Communist Party
- Education: PLA Air Force Second Aviation Preparatory School; PLA Air Force Eighth Aviation School

Chinese name
- Simplified Chinese: 危伟汉
- Traditional Chinese: 危偉漢
Transcriptions
Standard Mandarin
- Hanyu Pinyin: Wēi Wěihàn

Wei Weihan (Chinese: 危伟汉; born July 1965) is a former Chinese politician who spent his career in southeast China's Guangdong province. As of April 2024 he was under investigation by China's top anti-graft watchdog. He served as mayor of Zhongshan from 2018 to 2021.

== Biography ==
Wei was born in Guangzhou, Guangdong, in July 1965, and graduated from the PLA Air Force Second Aviation Preparatory School and PLA Air Force Eighth Aviation School.

After retiring from the People's Liberation Army (PLA) in March 1985, he was assigned to the People's Procuratorate of Hua County (now Huadu District) as a recorder and assistant prosecutor, and served until January 1992. He joined the Chinese Communist Party (CCP) in November 1987. After a year as a section member in the Office of the CCP Hua County Committee, he became head and party secretary of Xinhua Town. In February 1998, he was promoted to become vice governor of Haizhu District, a position he held until September 2006, when he was appointed vice governor of Huangpu District. He was deputy secretary=general of Guangzhou Municipal People's Government in December 2010 and subsequently director of Guangzhou Urban Management Committee and director of Guangzhou Urban Management Comprehensive Law Enforcement Bureau in December 2012. In August 2016, he was made party secretary of Liwan District, the top political position in the district. In October 2018, he was named acting mayor of Zhongshan, confirmed in the following month. He was chosen as party branch secretary of the Guangdong Provincial Veterans Affairs Department in June 2021, in addition to serving as deputy director. He was chosen as a first level inspector of the Guangdong Provincial Committee of the Chinese People's Political Consultative Conference.

== Investigation ==
On 18 February 2023, the CCP Guangdong Provincial Committee and the Guangdong Provincial People's Government admonished Wei, who was then deputy party secretary and mayor of Zhongshan, for his dereliction of duty in water pollution prevention and control in the city.

On 19 April 2024, he was put under investigation for alleged "serious violations of discipline and laws" by the Central Commission for Discipline Inspection (CCDI), the party's internal disciplinary body, and the National Supervisory Commission, the highest anti-corruption agency of China. His superior Lai Zehua, who was the than party secretary of Zhongshan, was disgraced on 12 May 2023. His predecessor Jiao Lansheng was sacked for graft on 7 November 2022.

Government offices
Preceded by Jiao Lansheng	Mayor of Zhongshan; 2018–2021	Succeeded by Xiao Zhanxin
