= Chiao =

Chiao can refer to:

- (properly ch'iao) Wade–Giles romanization of Qiao
- (properly chiao) Wade–Giles romanization of Jiao
- Alternate spelling of the Chinese monetary jiao

== People with the name ==
- Chiao Chiao (born 1943), Taiwanese film actress
- Leroy Chiao (born 1960), American chemical engineer and former NASA astronaut
- Raymond Chiao (born 1940), American physicist
- Roy Chiao (1927–1999), British Hong Kong-era Chinese actor

== See also ==
- Joanne Tseng (born 1988), also known as Chih-chiao, Taiwanese actress and singer
- Ciao (disambiguation)
