= Zhu Gui =

Zhu Gui is the name of:

- Zhu Gui (prince) (1374–1446), Ming dynasty prince
- Zhu Gui (printmaker) (c. 1644–1717), Qing dynasty woodcarver
- Zhu Gui (Water Margin), fictional Song dynasty hero from the novel Water Margin
