= Chen Dong =

Chen Dong may refer to:

- Chen Dong (Song dynasty) (陳東; 1086–1127), Chinese scholar
- Chen Dong (general) (陈东; born 1956), deputy commander of the Chinese air force
- Chen Dong (taikonaut) (陈冬; born 1978), Chinese astronaut who flew on the Shenzhou 11, Shenzhou 14, and Shenzhou 20 missions
- Chen Dong (footballer) (陈东; born 1978), Chinese footballer
- Chen Dong (politician) (陈东; born 1963), deputy director of the Hong Kong Liaison Office and deputy director of the Standing Committee of the Fujian Provincial People's Congress.
- Michelle Bai (陈东; born 1978), born Chen Dong, Chinese actress
