= HZU =

HZU may refer to:

- Hangzhou University, in Hangzhou, Zhejiang, China
- Huizhou University, in Huizhou, Guangdong, China
