= Fan Zhongjie =

Chinese politician (born 1966)

- 范中杰

Communist Party Secretary of the State owned Assets Supervision and Administration Commission of Guangdong Provincial People's Government
- In office June 2021 – October 2022

Personal details
- Born: June 1966 (age 60) Xichong County, Sichuan, China
- Party: Chinese Communist Party
- Education: Sichuan Normal University; South China Normal University; Wuhan University

Fan Zhongjie (Chinese: 范中杰; pinyin: Fan Zhongjie; born June 1966) is a former Chinese politician who spent his entire career in southeast China's Guangdong province. As of October 2022 he was under investigation by China's top anti-corruption agency. Previously he served as party secretary of the State owned Assets Supervision and Administration Commission of Guangdong Provincial People's Government.

He is a delegate to the 13th National People's Congress.

== Early life and education ==
Fan was born in Xichong County, Sichuan, in June 1966. In 1983, he entered Sichuan Normal University, where he majored in the Department of Education. From 1987 to 1990 he did his postgraduate work at South China Normal University. He was also a PhD student at Wuhan University between September 2005 and June 2008.

After University in 1990, he taught at Huiyang Normal School. After this office was terminated in December 1994, he became university administrator of Huizhou University, serving until July 2001.

== Political career ==
Fan joined the Chinese Communist Party (CCP) in July 1994. In July 2001, he became deputy director of Huizhou Municipal Education Bureau, rising to director in August 2005. He was chosen as assistant mayor of Huizhou in August 2008. He was appointed secretary-general of the CCP Huizhou Municipal Committee in October 2011 and was admitted to member of the Standing Committee of the CCP Huizhou Municipal Committee, the city's top authority. He was appointed vice mayor in January 2017.

He was deputy party secretary of Zhaoqing in July 2011, in addition to serving as mayor since August. In October 2019, he rose to become party secretary, the top political position in the city, and concurrently served as chairman of Zhaoqing Municipal People's Congress.

In June 2021, he took office as party secretary of the State owned Assets Supervision and Administration Commission of Guangdong Provincial People's Government.

== Investigation ==
On 30 October 2022, Fan was put under investigation for alleged "serious violations of discipline and laws" by the Central Commission for Discipline Inspection (CCDI), the party's internal disciplinary body, and the National Supervisory Commission, the highest anti-corruption agency of China.

Government offices
Preceded by Chen Xudong (陈旭东)	Mayor of Zhaoqing; 2017–2019	Succeeded by Lü Yuyin
Party political offices
Preceded by Lai Zehua	Communist Party Secretary of Zhaoqing; 2019–2021	Succeeded by Lü Yuyin
