= Review Centre =

ReviewCentre.com

- Website type: review site
- Available in: English
- Owner: private
- Website: reviewcentre.com
- Registration: available
- Launched: 1999
- Current status: active

ReviewCentre.com is a privately owned, UK operated consumer review site in the same vein as Epinions and Ciao.com.

== History ==
The site was first launched in 1999 and has grown into one of the web's largest review sites. The company behind reviewcentre.com was sold to a management buy-in team backed by Ingenious Media in June 2008.

== Facilities ==
Users of the site can write a review on just about any subject they choose ranging from mobile phones to Loan Companies.

The key difference between Review Centre and its competitors is the lack of financial incentive to the writers of the reviews - this means that there is no other motive to write a review than to help other consumers which may explain why reviews on Review Centre are more personal.

One should be wary of this fact as reviews can often appear as a personal grudge/attack on businesses and may give a distorted view - many people will only leave a review when something is wrong.

== Charity campaigns ==
Review Centre has garnered media attention for its charity campaigns which donate money to a chosen cause for each review written, usually run around Christmas time.

MoneyWeek named Review Centre its "Website of the Week", encouraging readers to add contributions to the site.

== International Conference on System Sciences review ==
A paper delivered in January 2006 to the International Conference on System Sciences which used Review Centre as a case study, suggests that the language and review content on the site is constructed in such a way as to make it reflect that the writers are often knowledgeable about their subject-matter, but still non-professional users of the products.

ReviewCentre has its fair share of advertisements and has so far maintained reviews as its primary focus - this is currently a major cause of debate on competitor sites whose communities do not like the prevalence of advertising.

One area of the site where ReviewCentre does stay ahead of its competitors is 'community' - also, enjoying a strong user base and member interaction is currently growing. Pollach's study suggests that the nature of the genre could be the reasoning for this as users strive to appear professional in their reviews, almost actively discouraging discussion. The differences in the presentation of reviews on Review Centre and the structure of that information in comparison to its competitors have been diminishing and may explain why Review Centre operates as much of a community site than Ciao or Epinions.

However the downside is that the staff at Review Centre do not appear to take negative reviews or their potential effects on businesses very seriously which leaves the system open to abuse.

== Travel ==
The site also provides a range of Consumer guides with good coverage in the travel section e.g.Australia Travel Guide.

The German variation of the site - ReviewCentre.de has less coverage, mainly focusing on consumer electronics.
