= Ciao Ciao =

Ciao Ciao (Italian for 'Bye-Bye') may refer to:

- "Ciao ciao", the Italian version of the 1964 Petula Clark song "Downtown"
- "Ciao-Ciao", a song from the 1994 Status Quo album Thirsty Work
- "Ciao ciao" (song), a 2022 song by La Rappresentante di Lista
- Ciao Ciao (film), a 2025 comedy-drama film by Keith Albert Tedesco

== See also ==
- Ciao (disambiguation)
