= Piaggio Si =

Piaggio Sì
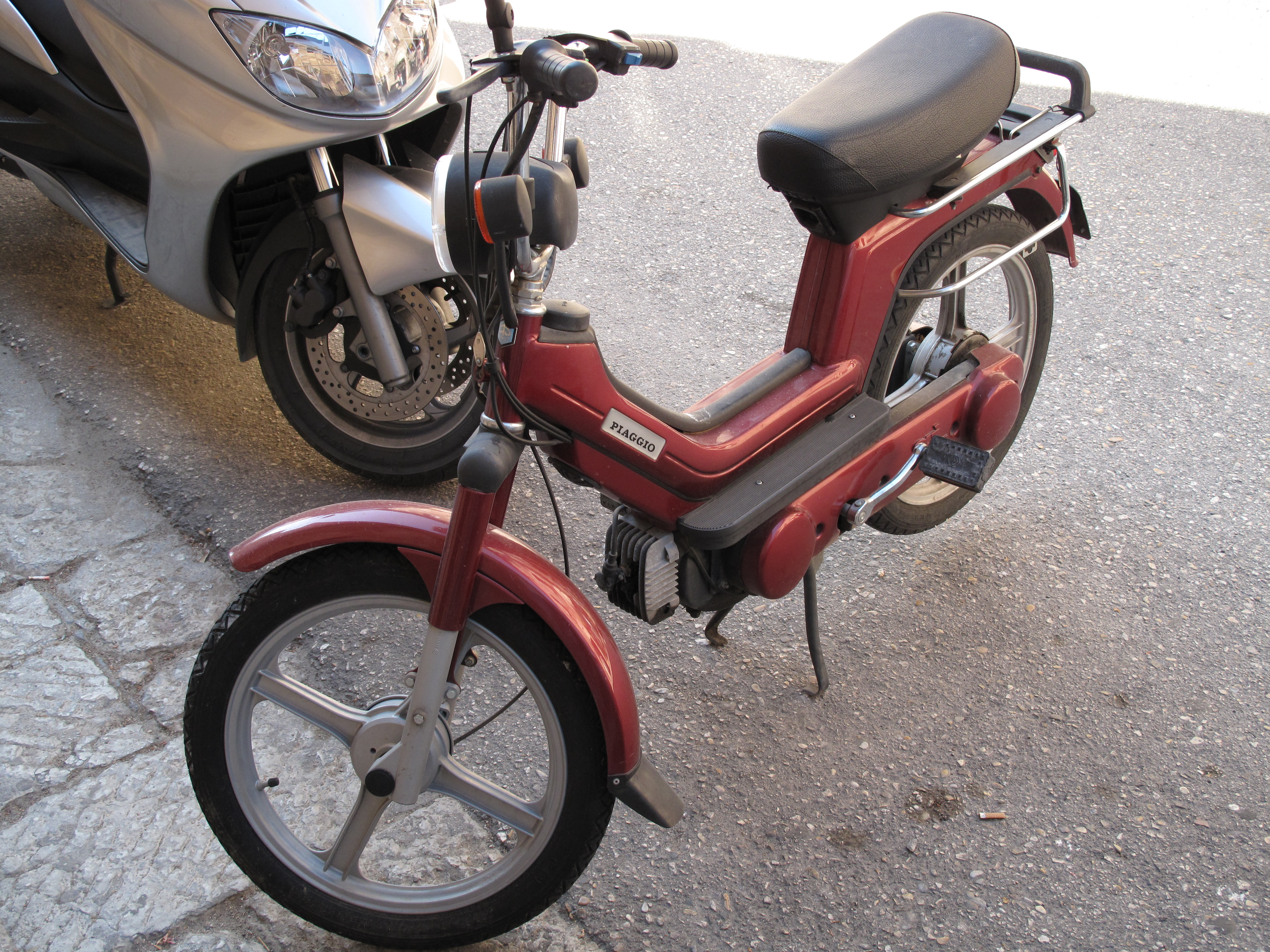
- Piaggio Sì FL2
- Manufacturer: Piaggio
- Also called: Piaggio Si
- Production: 1978-2001
- Assembly: Pontedera, Italy
- Predecessor: Piaggio Boxer
- Class: Moped
- Related: Piaggio Ciao; Gilera CBA; Gilera CB1

The Piaggio Sì is a moped that was produced by the Italian manufacturer Piaggio.

It received homologation on 20 November 1978 and was presented in Genoa on 1 February 1979.

In the North American market it was sold by the American division of Piaggio, the Vespa of America Corporation, as Piaggio Si.

== Description ==
With engine derived from the contemporary Piaggio Ciao, it differed from it for the fork telescopic front, rear monoshock instead of rigid frame, for the headlights front and rear of different design, for the longer saddle, more comfortable and equipped with a small compartment under the saddle, and for the 4-spoke wheels.

As for the engine, it differed only in the cylinder head of different design and with longer cooling fins. Furthermore, there is a version equipped with Variomatic, a solution that allows you to overcome slopes more easily by increasing the reduction ratio of the transmission system.

== The models ==
=== First series (1979-1987) ===
The Sì, on sale in Italy since February 1979, was available with both long saddle and short saddle and spoke or alloy wheels. This model, until about mid-1979 was only available in two colors: Light Gray Metallic 108 and Beige 560. Subsequently, around mid-1979, the Blue Marine color was added. The muffler was square in section. It was available with variator (SIV) and pulley (SIM). The engine had the traditional ignition with points. The brake levers were made of metal and ended in a ball. In April/May 1980 the mud flap was added and from 1981/82 the brake levers became plastic. In 1981 the horn button also changed, which until then had been a gray casing and then became all black. Since 1983, the short saddle and spoked wheels were optional. From 1984 the optional electronic engine was introduced. From 1984/85 the engine cradle was no longer in body color but black/gray.

==== Sì Montecarlo ====
It differs from the first series for the upside-down and advanced hydraulic fork as in the Piaggio Bravo, and the double rear shock absorber.

==== Sì Tuttorosso ====
It differs from the Montecarlo in various red painted details.

==== Sì Ecology System ====
It differs from the first series for the new thermal unit and for the stickers on the side panels. The electronic ignition option was maintained.

=== Second series "Electronic" or "FL" (1987-1992) ===
This series differed from the previous one only in the fact that it had electronic ignition as standard, the muffler was round and the plastics were painted. The cradle turns black. Under the seat it had "Electronic" on the left and a label with the model name on the right. It was available in SIM and SIV versions. Kick starter was available as an option.

=== Third series "FL2" (1992-2001) ===
Born to complement (and then replace) the FL series, this model only had a different saddle (more rounded) and some plastic details. The last examples were catalyzed. They were available in the version with points and with electronic ignition, and as optional the direction indicators.

==== Sì Mix ====
It is an FL2 with automatic mixer. The oil tank is under the saddle. to check the oil level, a small porthole has been placed on the left side where the level can be kept under control. Also equipped with a small buoyancy ball for more accurate control. Two orange reflectors have also been placed on the sides immediately under the saddle.

==== Sì Miami ====
It is a blue FL2 with specific stickers.
