= Wu Shuang Pu =

Chinese book of biographies of heroes (1694)

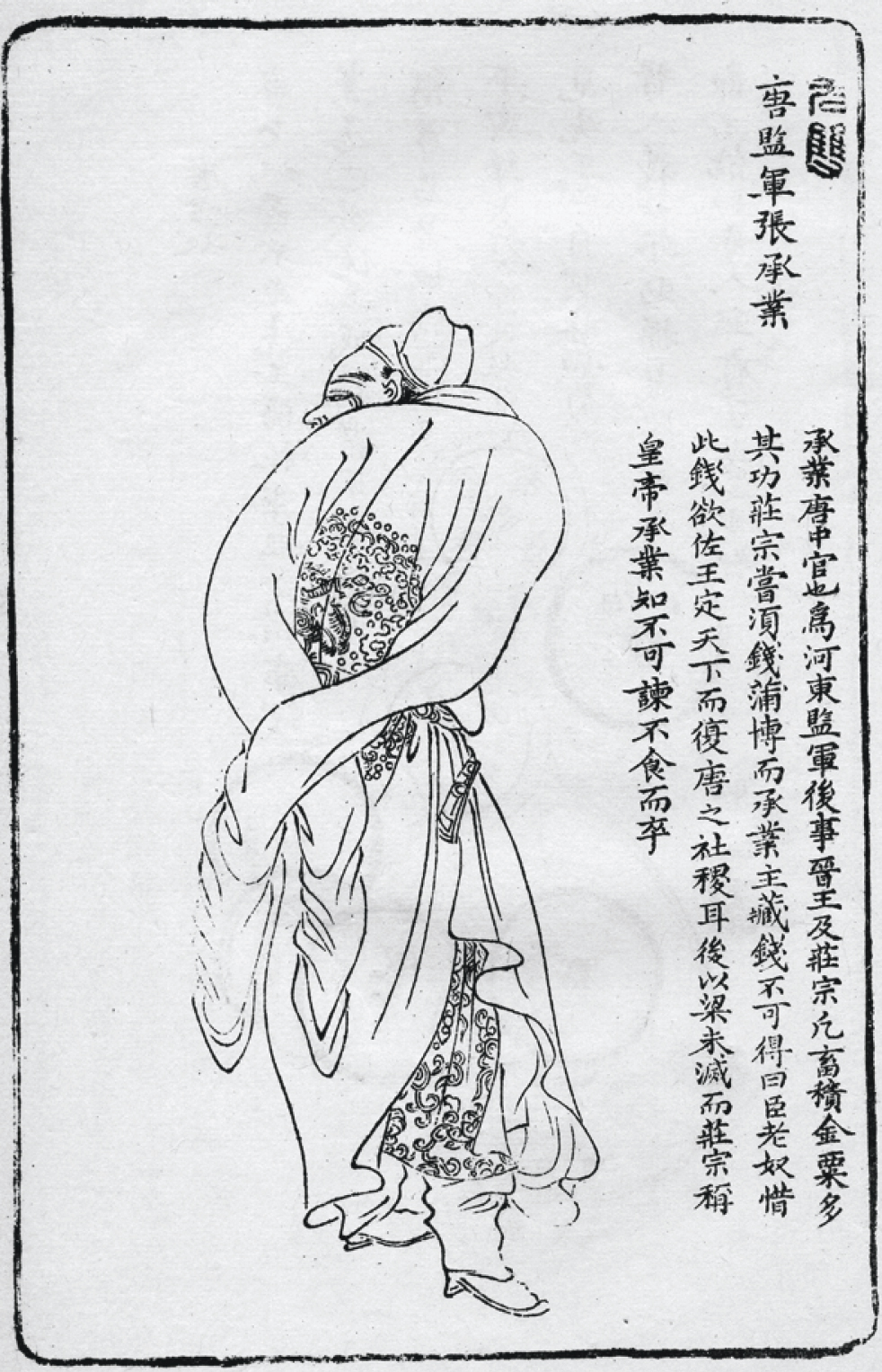
- Zhang Chengye as depicted in the Wu Shuang Pu (無雙譜, Table of Peerless Heroes) by Jin Gulian
- Traditional Chinese: 無雙譜
- Simplified Chinese: 无双谱
Transcriptions
Standard Mandarin
- Hanyu Pinyin: Wú Shuāng Pǔ
- Bopomofo: ㄨˊㄕㄨㄤㄆㄨˇ
- Wade–Giles: Wu^{2} Shuang^{1} Pʻu^{3}
- IPA: [ǔ ʂwáŋ pʰù]
Hakka
- Romanization: Vu^{2} Sung^{1} Pu^{3}
Yue: Cantonese
- Yale Romanization: Wu^{2} Shwang^{1} Pu^{3}
- Jyutping: Mou^{4} Soeng^{1} Pou^{2}

Alternative name (Nanling Wu Shuang Pu)
- Chinese: 南陵無雙譜
- Literal meaning: Nanling Table of Peerless Heroes
Transcriptions
Standard Mandarin
- Hanyu Pinyin: Nánlíng Wú Shuāng Pǔ
- Bopomofo: ㄋㄢˊㄌㄧㄥˊㄨˊㄕㄨㄤㄆㄨˇ
- Wade–Giles: Nan^{2}-ling^{2} Wu^{2} Shuang^{1} Pʻu^{3}
Yue: Cantonese
- Jyutping: naam^{4}ling^{4} Mou^{4} Soeng^{1} Pou^{2}

Wu Shuang Pu
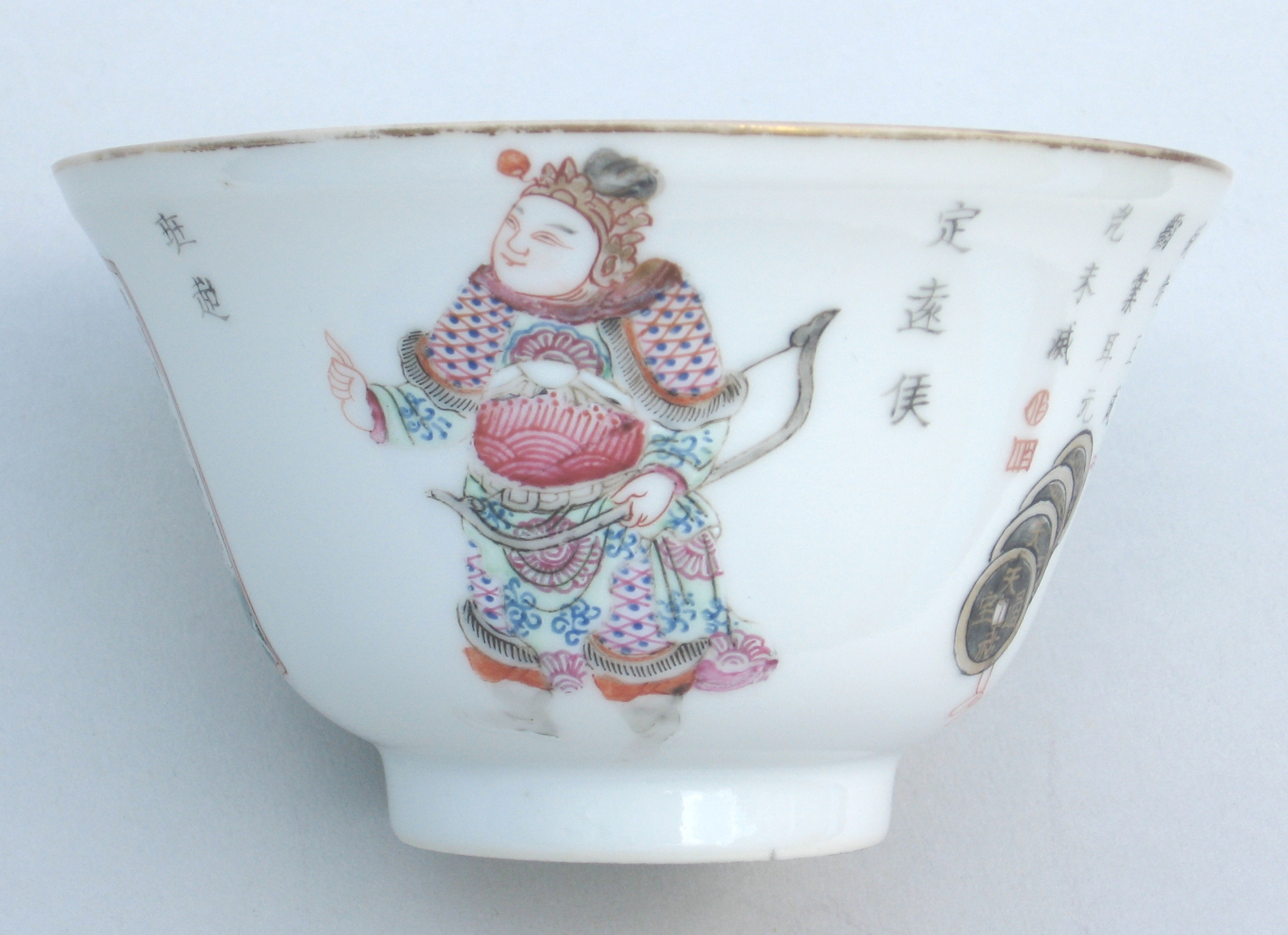
- Ban Chao (32–102) depicted on Chinese porcelain, Xianfeng period (1850–1861)

Wu Shuang Pu
- Poem of Ban Zhao (45–116)
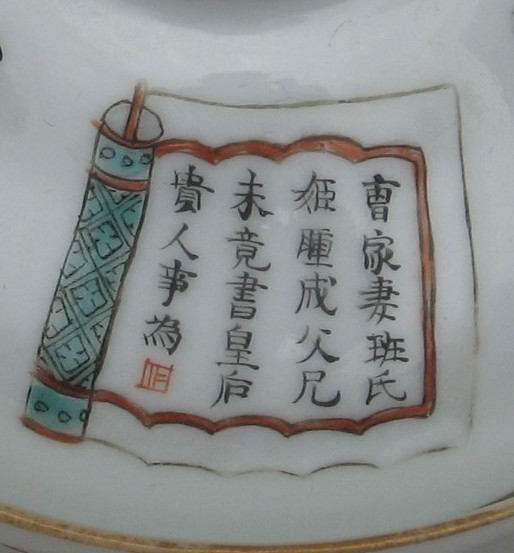
- She was the wife of Cao Shishu. She finished the book of the royal family that her father and brother has started. She served the royal family as a teacher.

Wu Shuang Pu (Chinese: 無雙譜; lit. 'Table of Peerless Heroes') is a book of woodcut prints, first printed in 1694, early on in the Qing dynasty. This book contains the biographies and imagined portraits of 40 notable heroes and heroines from the Han dynasty to the Song dynasty, all accompanied by a brief introduction and guided by a related poem in yuefu style. The illustrations from the book were widely distributed and re-used, often as motifs on Chinese porcelain.

The original book has a seal that says Nanling, which is why the book is also known as Nanling Wu Shuang Pu. A re-edition of this book from the year 1699 is kept in the National Museum of China.

The scholar and philologist Mao Qiling praised the book in the preface, he felt that the prose in this book formed a trinity with the poems and prints.

The painter of Wu Shuang Pu is Jin Shi (金史, c.1625–1695), who was known as Jin Guliang (金古良), born in Shanyin (now Shaoxing, Zhejiang, China). Jin Guliang was inspired by Chen Hongshou and was following the examples of Cui Zizhong, who initiated the first major revival of figure painting since the Song dynasty. Jin Guliang compiled the book together with woodcarver Zhu Gui.

== Included biographies ==
No.	Name	Translation (pinyin)	Also known as
1	张良	Zhang Liang (c. 250–189 BC), pinyin: Zhāng Liàng	Zhang Zifang 张子房, Liu Hou 留侯
2	項籍	Xiang Ji (232–202 BC), pinyin: Xiàng Jí	Xiang Yu 项羽, Xichu Bawang 西楚霸王
3	伏生	Fu Sheng (c. 268–178 BC), pinyin: Fú Shēng	Master Fu 伏生
4	东方朔	Dongfang Shuo (154–93 BC), pinyin: Dōngfāng Shuò	Dongfang ManQian 东方曼倩
5	张骞	Zhang Qian (164–114 BC), pinyin: Zhāng Qiān	
6	苏武	Su Wu (140–60 BC), pinyin: Sū Wǔ	Su Si Qing 苏子卿
7	司马迁	Sima Qian (c. 145–86 BC), pinyin: Sīmǎ Qiān	Long Men Si 龙门司, Ma Qian Si 马迁司, Ma Zi Chang 马子长
8	董贤	Dong Xian (23–1 BC), pinyin: Dǒng xián	
9	严子陵	Yan Ziling (c. 0–75), pinyin: Yán Zǐlíng	Yan Xiansheng 严先生, Yan Guang 嚴光
10	曹娥	Cao E (c. 130–143), pinyin: Cáo É	Cao Xiaonü 曹孝女
11	班超	Ban Chao (32–102), pinyin: Bān Chāo	Ding Yuan Hou 定远侯, Zhong Sheng 仲升
12	班昭	Ban Zhao (45–116), pinyin: Bān Zhāo	Ban Huiban 班惠班, Cao Daijia 曹大家
13	赵娥	Zhao E (c. 25–220), pinyin: Zhào É	Zhao E Qin 趙娥親, Pang E 龐娥
14	孙策	Sun Ce (175–200), pinyin: Sūn Cè	Jiang Dong Sun Lang 江东孙郎
15	诸葛亮	Zhuge Liang (181–234), pinyin: Zhūgě Liàng	Han Cheng Qiang 汉丞相
16	焦孝然	Jiao Xiaoran (c. 481–221 BC), pinyin: Jiāo Xiàorán	Yin Shi 隐士, Jiao Xian 焦先
17	刘谌	Liu Chen (220–263), pinyin: Liú Chén	Beidi Wang-Prince of Beidi 北地王
18	羊祜	Yang Hu (221–278), pinyin: Yáng Hù	Yang Shu Zi 羊叔子
19	周处	Zhou Chu (236–297), pinyin: Zhōu Chǔ	Ziyin 子隱
20	绿珠	Lüzhu (c. 250–300), pinyin: Lǜ Zhū	Liang 良
21	陶渊明	Tao Yuanming (365–427), pinyin: Táo Yuānmíng	Tao Qian 陶潛
22	王猛	Wang Meng (325–375), pinyin: Wáng Měng	Wang Jing Lue 王景略
23	謝安	Xie An (320–385), pinyin: Xiè Ān	Xie Gong 谢公, Jin Tai Fu 晋太傅, Xie Anshi 謝安石
24	苏蕙	Su Hui (351–381), pinyin: Sū Huì	Su Ruo Lan 苏若兰
25	花木兰	Hua Mulan (c. 400–500), pinyin: Huā Mùlán	
26	冼夫人	Xian Furen (512–602), pinyin: Xiǎn Fūren	Xian Zhen 冼珍, Lady Xian 冼夫人, Qiaoguo Furen-Lady of Qiaoguo 谯国夫人
27	武则天	Wu Zetian (624–705), pinyin: Wǔ Zétiān	Wu Zhao 武曌
28	狄仁杰	Di Renjie (630–700), pinyin: Dí Rénjié	Liang Gong 梁公
29	安金藏	An Jincang (c. 600–800), pinyin: Ān Jīncáng	
30	郭子仪	Guo Ziyi (697–781), pinyin: Guō Zǐyí	Guo Shangfu/Guo Changfu, Fenyang wang-Prince of Fenyang 尚父郭汾阳王
31	李白	Li Bai (701–762), pinyin: Lǐ Bái	Li Tai Bai, Li po, Li Tai Po, Li Qing Lian, (Hao) Qinglian Jushi
32	李畢	Li Bi (722–789), pinyin: Lǐ Bì	Li Mi 李泌, Liye Hou 李邺侯
33	张承业	Zhang Chengye (846–922), pinyin: Zhāng Chéngyè	Tang Jian Jun 唐建军
34	冯道	Feng Dao (882–954), pinyin: Féng Dào	Chang Yue Lao 长乐老
35	陳摶	Chen Tuan (871–989), pinyin: Chén Tuán	Chen Chuan 陈抟, Chen Tunan 陳南
36	钱镠	Qian Liu (852–932), pinyin: Qián liú	Qian Jumei 具美, Qian Poliu 钱婆留
37	安民	An Min (c. 1050–1125), pinyin: Ān Mín	
38	陈东	Chen Dong (1086–1127), pinyin: Chén Dōng	Tai Xue Lu 太学绿
39	岳飞	Yue Fei (1103–1142), pinyin: Yuè Fēi	Yue E Wang 岳鄂王
40	文天祥	Wen Tianxiang (1236–1283), pinyin: Wén Tiānxiáng	Wen Chengxiang 丞相

== Selected republications (Chinese) ==
- Jin, Guliang (1996). Wushuang pu. Shijiazhuang: Hebei peoples publishing house, China. ISBN 7531008157.
- Jin, Guliang (2013). Wushuang pu. Hefei: Anhui peoples publishing house, China. ISBN 978-7212060541.
