= Gilera CB1 =

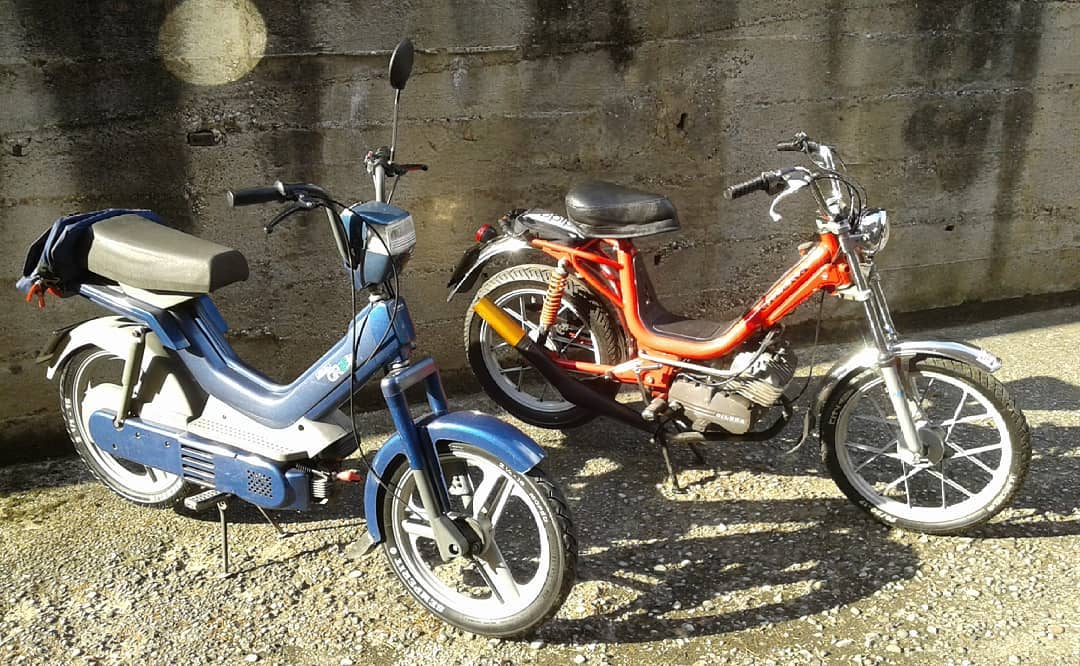
- Atala Green (left) and Gilera CB1 (right)
- Manufacturer: Gilera
- Parent company: Piaggio
- Production: 1975-1989
- Assembly: Arcore, Italy
- Successor: Gilera Trend
- Class: Moped
- Engine: 49.77 cm^{3} Two-stroke air-cooled
- Top speed: 40 km/h
- Power: 1.0 kW
- Transmission: 4-speed manual
- Tires: 2.5x17”
- Wheelbase: 1164 mm
- Dimensions: L: 1782 mm W: 702 mm H: 1090 mm
- Weight: 63 kg (dry)
- Fuel capacity: 4.5L (of which 0.7L reserve)
- Related: Piaggio Ciao; Piaggio Boxer; Piaggio Si; Gilera CBA

The Gilera CB1 is a moped produced by the Italian manufacturer Gilera from 1975 to 1989.

== History ==
It was equipped with a classic single-cylinder 2-stroke 49 cm3 air-cooled engine. Unlike other mopeds of its generation it was equipped with a 4-speed gearbox and a vertical cylinder in chromed aluminum with crank start and the classic final chain drive.

The engine was derived from the engines of the road, cross and trial models, more robust and performing than those that equipped the other main Piaggio Group mopeds (Gilera CBA, Piaggio Si, Ciao, Boxer and Bravo) equipped with the classic single-speed horizontal cylinder.

The tank was built inside the twin-tubular frame, designed by the designer Paolo Martin, as well as the Gilera CBA.

It featured a robust and complete suspension system with a hydraulic telescopic fork at the front and a pair of rear hydraulic shock absorbers. 17" front wheel and 16" rear wheel.

The braking system consisted of two drum brakes with lever at the front and pedal for the rear brake.

The lighting system was manageable from the handlebar, with double click position/low beam.

It was initially marketed in the short saddle and spoked wheels version. Subsequently, on the second series, the long folding saddle and light alloy wheels with larger brake drums were introduced as an option.

The third series of 1982 was aesthetically updated with square shaped headlights, mudguards in the same color, exhaust and saddle of different shape, while maintaining the same mechanical setting of the previous versions.
