= Piaggio Boxer =

Moped produced by Piaggio

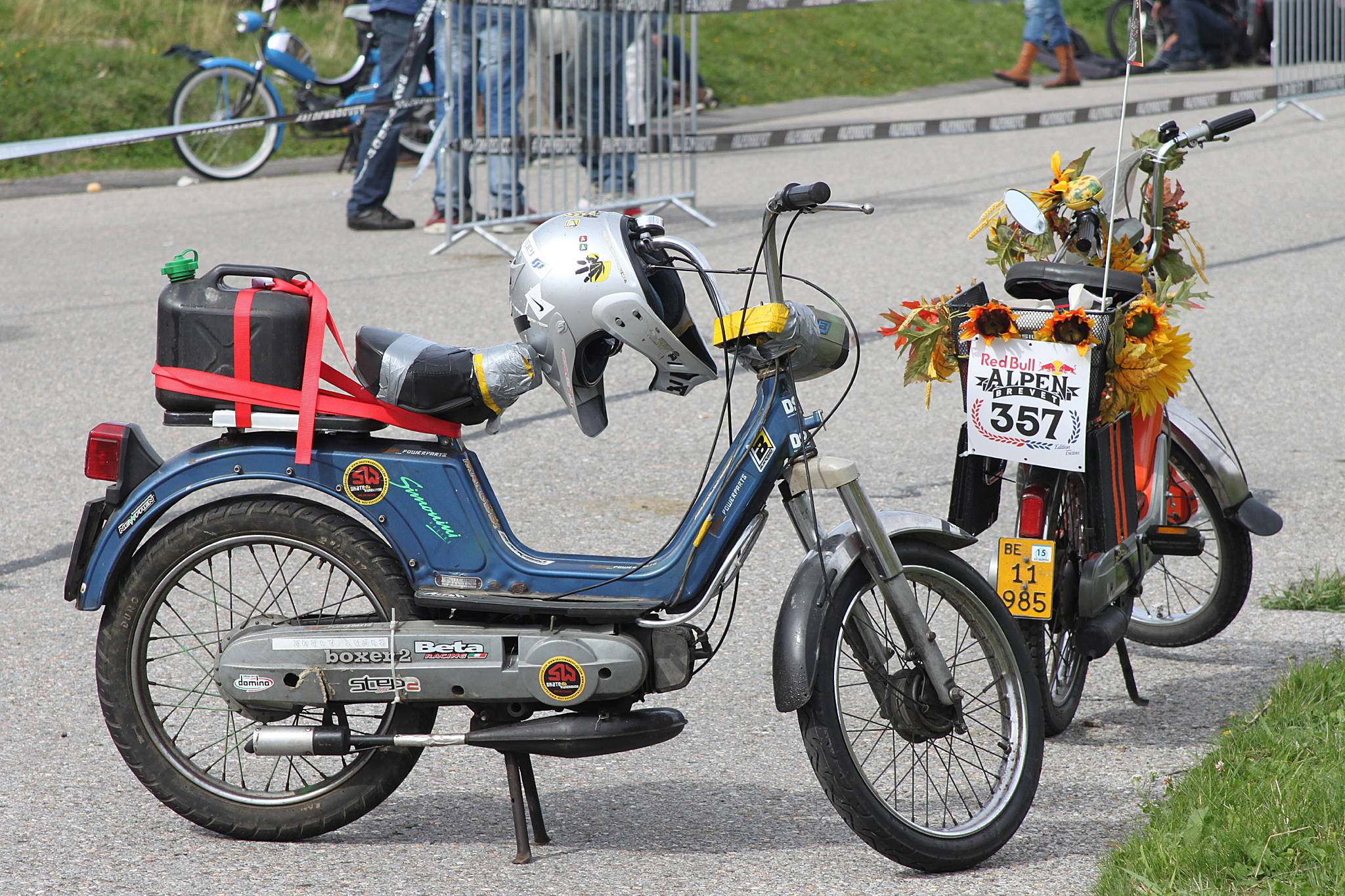
- Boxer 2
- Manufacturer: Piaggio
- Production: 1970–1983
- Assembly: Pontedera, Italy
- Successor: Piaggio Si
- Class: Moped
- Related: Piaggio Ciao; Gilera CBA; Gilera CB1

The Piaggio Boxer is a moped produced by the Italian manufacturer Piaggio.

== History ==
The first series of the Boxer was built using the underseat as a tank (plastic tank), it had 18-inch high wheels and a small single-seater saddle. Long saddle upon request.

Rare examples of the first series had the front suspension of the shackle type already used on the Piaggio Ciao (version B1M); but the vast majority of Boxers left the assembly line with the telescopic fork (B2V and B3M versions).

It had the transmission in two versions: with variator of speed with expandable pulleys and clutch automatic centrifugal (B2V version), or with the only centrifugal clutch and final pulley (versions B1M and B3M).

Another novelty was the displacement of the identification plate, bearing the chassis number, at the end of the rear fender.

The second series called Boxer 2 differs from the previous one for the stickers, the frame profile, the front fender without rods, gray plastic and the 17” wheels. It was produced in two versions: BTM (single-speed) and BTV (with variator). The second series did not include a shackle suspension.

Subsequently, it was replaced by the Piaggio Si, which was practically a modernization, with a new chassis but with the same layout and engine.
