= CIAO =

- Component-Integrated ACE ORB, a CORBA Component Model (CCM) implementation
- CIAO: Columbia International Affairs Online, an electronic database from Columbia University Press
- CIAO (AM): Radio station at 790 kHz in Brampton, Ontario
- CHLO (AM): Radio station at 530 kHz in Brampton, Ontario, that once held the CIAO call sign

== See also ==
- Ciao (disambiguation)
