= An Jincang =

Chiinese court official (died 711); saved the life of Emperor Ruizong

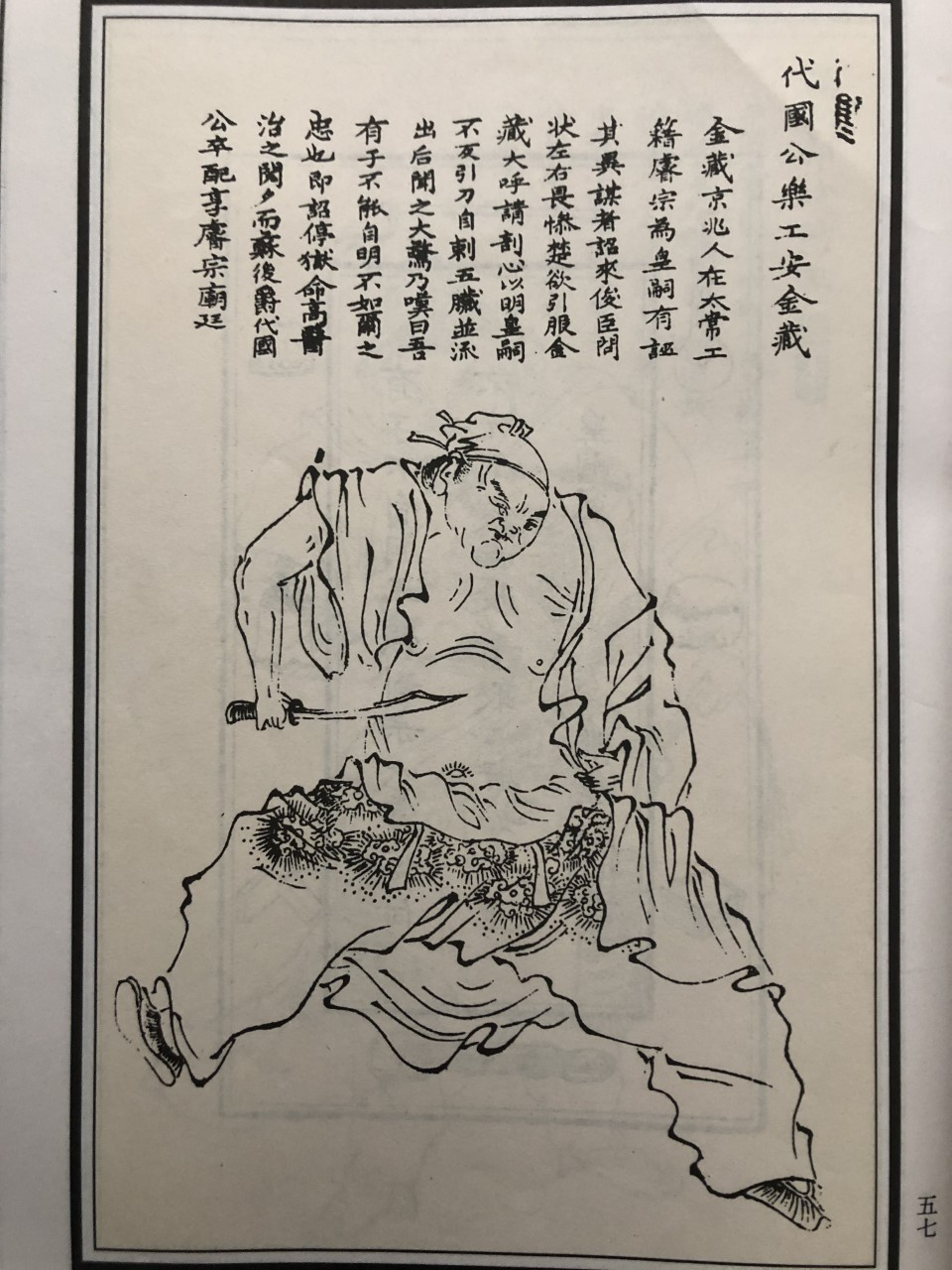
An Jin Cang as depicted in the Wu Shuang Pu (無雙譜, Table of Peerless Heroes) by Jin Guliang

An Jincang (Chinese: 安金藏; Wade–Giles: An Chin-ts'ang) (? - 711) was a Tang dynasty court official responsible for saving the life of Li Dan, the future emperor.

A native of Luoyang, he was employed in the Court of Sacrificial Worship under the Empress Wu Zetian. When charges of treason were brought against the heir apparent Li Dan (future Emperor Ruizong of Tang), he loudly protested that the latter was innocent; and in token of good faith seized a knife and ripped up his own belly so that his bowels hung down to the ground. It was with difficulty that his life was saved; the Empress, however, was convinced of his loyalty, and Li Dan was left in peace. His name was subsequently carved upon Mount Tai and Mount Hua, and he was canonized as Zhong 忠.

An Jincang is depicted in the Wu Shuang Pu (無雙譜, Table of Peerless Heroes) by Jin Guliang. The illustrations for this 17thC book were widespread and reused, including in porcelain.
