= Yan Guang =

Chinese sage

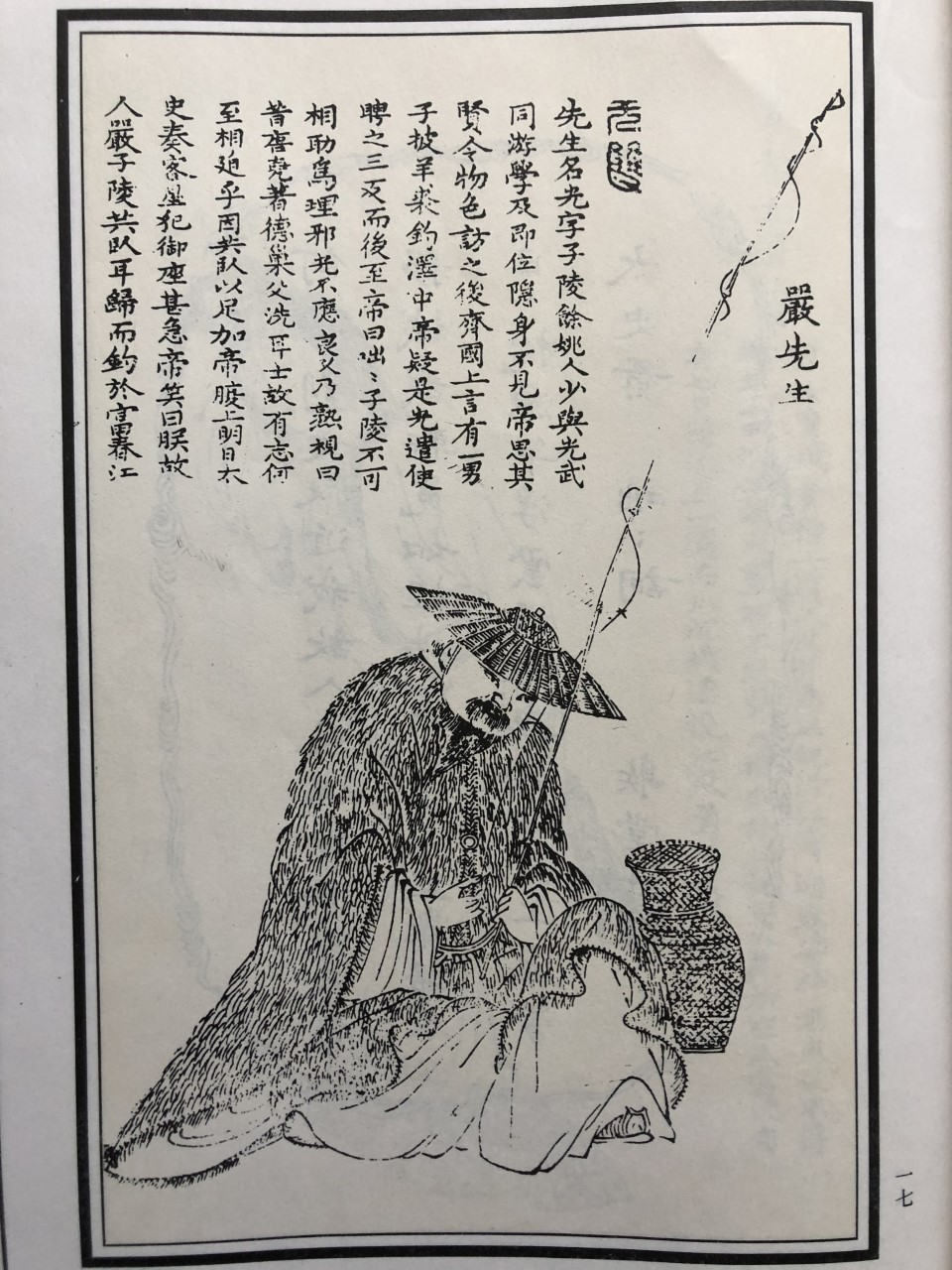
Yan Ziling as depicted in the Wu Shuang Pu (無雙譜, Table of Peerless Heroes) by Jin Guliang

Yan Guang (Chinese: 嚴光, c. 1 – 75), courtesy name Ziling (Chinese: 子陵), also known as Zhuang Guang (Chinese: 莊光), was one of the four important sages of Yuyao.

== Study ==
He became a scholar and studied together with Emperor Liu Xiu (courtesy name: Wenshu), known as Emperor Guangwu of Han.

== Legacy ==
Liu Xiu offered Yan Ziling a high position in the court. Yan refused the offer, fearing he would become corrupt, and chose to live as a hermit in the mountains. This act made Yan Ziling a famous Chinese hero and gave him a place in the Wu Shuang Pu (無雙譜, Table of Peerless Heroes) by Jin Guliang. The images and poems for this book are widely spread and reused over again, including in porcelain art

== In popular culture ==
- Yan Ziling is portrayed by Ma Tianyu in the 2016 Chinese drama Singing All Along.
