= Jiao =

Jiao may refer to:

- Horn (Chinese constellation), or Jiao (角宿), a Chinese constellation
- Jiaolong, or Jiao (蛟), a Chinese dragon
- Jiao (currency) (角), a unit of currency in China, one-tenth of a Chinese yuan or dollar
- Jiao (surname) (焦), a Chinese surname
- Jiao River (Shandong), in Shandong, China
- Jiao River (Zhejiang), in Zhejiang, China
- Jiao, a Chinese form of litter (vehicle)

== Mythology ==
- Lady Jiao, also known as Fubao
