= Pang E =

2nd-century Eastern Han dynasty avenging daughter

Zhao E 趙娥
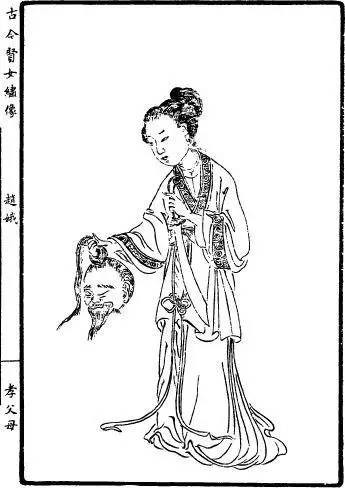
- Zhao E chopped off the head of Li Shou with his sword.
- Era: Later Han dynasty
- Children: Pang Yu (龐淯)
- Father: Zhao An (趙安)
- Relatives: at least three brothers

Pang E (Chinese: 龐娥) born Zhao E (Chinese: 趙娥; fl.170-179) was a Chinese noblewoman of the late Eastern Han period, and the mother of Cao Wei politician Pang Yu (龐淯; fl.200-221). She killed the man who killed her father, in full public view in front of a government office, but after turning herself in and requesting execution under the law, she not only escaped punishment but was later commended for her virtue.

Her case was recorded in Huangfu Mi's six-chapter updated continuation of Liu Xiang's earlier classic Biographies of Exemplary Women, traditionally considered an instructional text for Confucian women. Due to her act of extreme bravery, she was immortalized as one of the exemplars of courage and virtue performed by a woman in Chinese history. Zhao E is one of the heroines depicted in the Wu Shuang Pu (Table of Peerless Heroes) by Jin Guliang.

== Biography in Records of the Three Kingdoms ==
Born in Gansu, she was the eldest daughter of Zhao An, and had three younger brothers. It happened that her father was murdered by a certain Li Shou (李壽), who lived in the same town of Jiuquan. Her three younger brothers all died of illness before they could take revenge. One day, in front of the governmental pagoda in the prefectural capital, Zhao E produced a blade hidden behind the curtains of her carriage, and stabbed Li Shou to death in broad daylight. (Note: Chen Shou did not date Pang E's killing of Li Shou.)

She turned herself in immediately and confessed. Without changing expression, she stated for the record: "My father is avenged; I request execution." In traditional Chinese culture, avenging the death of a father is seen as upholding the important virtue of filial piety, and the magistrate Yin Jia (尹嘉) was so swayed by her case that he proposed to step down from his office rather than execute her. Zhao E did not want to be the end of this man's career, and eventually was returned forcibly to her home.

A general amnesty ended any chance Zhao E would be punished for the killing, and the people of her region commended her in relief. A stele was erected describing her story.

== In Huangfu Mi's Biographies of Exemplary Women ==
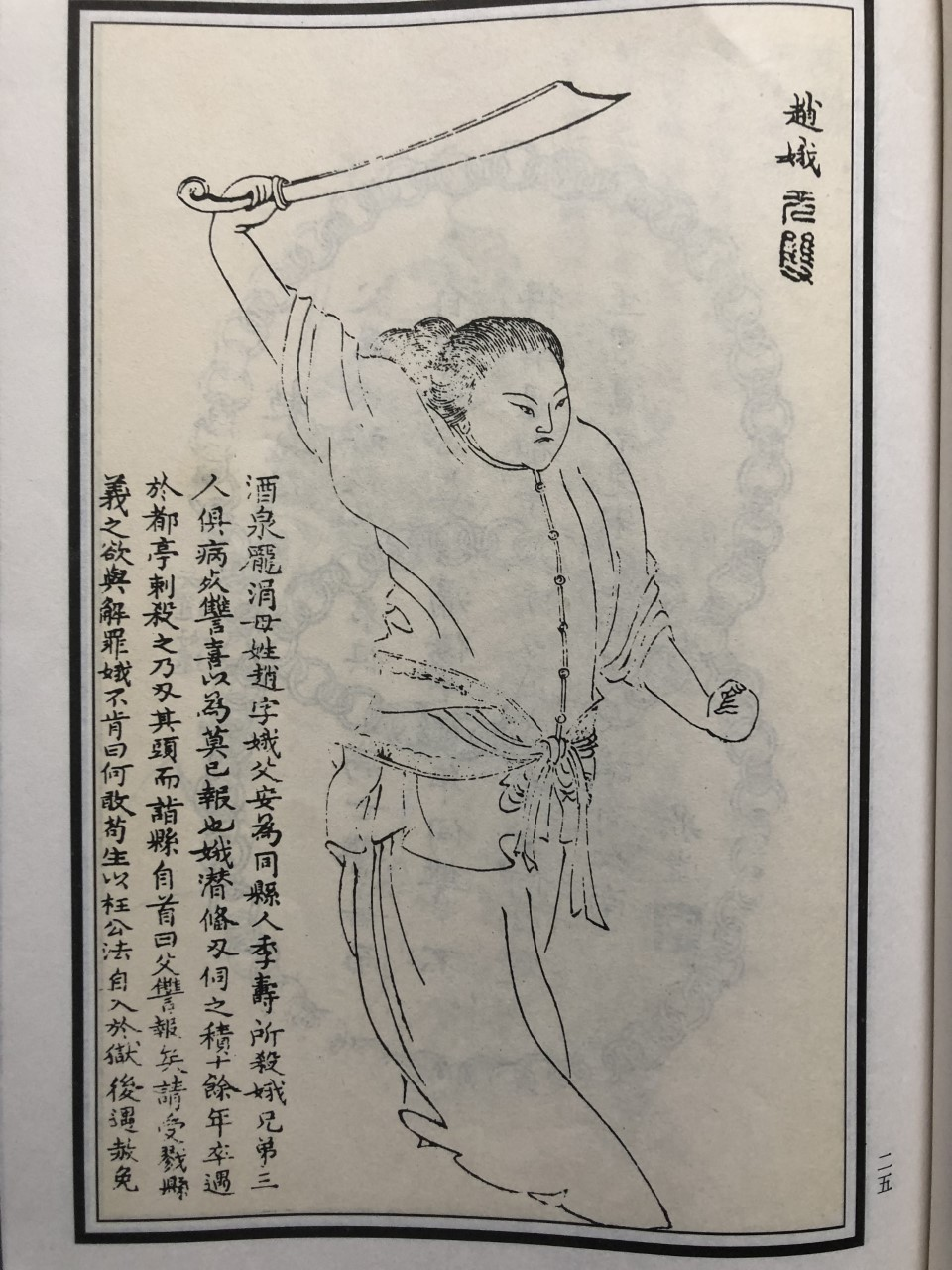
Zhao E

An exemplary woman of Jiuquan was Zhao E, (Note: Huangfu Mi consistently presents the protagonist's given name as "Eqin" (娥親), after introducing her once as Pang Eqin.) wife of Pang Zixia of Biaoshi and daughter of Zhao An (Note: Huangfu Mi has "Zhao Jun'an" (趙君安).) of Lufu (祿福). Zhao An was killed by his fellow countryman Li Shou. Other members of the Zhao household took ill and died. Zhao E and her three younger brothers plotted to avenge him only for the latter three to die from the plague (Note: There were plagues in China in 151, 161, 171, 173, 179 (and, after the events that brought Zhao E to fame, in 182, 185, and 217). These may have been related to, or the same illness as, the Antonine Plague in Rome (165–180).) before they could take action. When Li Shou learned of their misfortune, he held a banquet to celebrate his personal victory over the Zhao household, haughtily saying:

"All the strong ones of the Zhao clan are now dead and only a weak daughter remains. I need worry no longer."

These words were heard by Pang Yu, the son of Zhao E, and told to Zhao E, so that it inspired her to commit revenge. When Li Shou heard that Zhao E wanted to kill him, he rode a horse with a sword into the street to protect himself against it. Because of his fierce personality, the villagers feared Li Shou. Her neighbors feared that Zhao E would not be able to defeat Li Shou, trying to dissuade her, but she still insists on not letting go of her revenge.

She secretly bought a sword and sharpened it day and night, hoping to defeat her enemy, the advice of her family and neighbors made her more determined to kill Li Shou, so she left her family affairs and focused on waiting for the opportunity to kill him.

One morning in late March or early April 179, (Note: Huangfu Mi dated Pang E's killing of Li Shou to the first third of the 2nd month of the 2nd year of the Guang'he era; the month corresponds to 26 Mar to 23 Apr 179 in the Julian calendar.) Zhao E armed herself with a sword and set out to find him. She encountered Li Shou in broad daylight and stabbed his horse, causing him to fall from it. She then fought with Li Shou and killed him, then cut off his head. While holding Li Shou's head, she immediately turned herself in to the authorities and asked to be executed.

Despite awaiting execution for her act, she was pardoned by officials who were sympathetic to her cause. It is said that Magistrate Yin Jia did not want her to be punished upon learning of her circumstances to the point that he was willing to relinquish his office so that she could live. Yin Jia was going to resign so as not to judge her, but she refused to be afforded special treatment. The people heard the news, and they came in greater and greater numbers, and all supported her. The district lieutenant did not dare arrest Zhao E, implicitly advised her to leave Tang County, and forced her to go home. Zhao E's insistence on obeying the law earned her many admirers who escorted her home, her legacy was spread throughout the nation and she was greatly revered.

An amnesty was issued (Note: The annals of Emperor Ling (vol.08) of Houhanshu recorded that there was a general amnesty on 16 Jun 179 (ding'you day of the 4th month of the 2nd year of the Guang'he era), about two and a half months after Pang E killed Li Shou.) thus she was able to escape punishment honorably. In admiration of her sense of duty, the provincial authorities set up a stele at her gate while such courage and enterprise displayed by a woman were reported to the court and celebrated across the empire. Her son, Pang Yu, also earned a reputation for his courage and loyalty; he was appointed a Marquis within the Passes during the reign of Emperor Wen of Wei.

== See also ==
- Xiahou Lingnü, another woman from the Three Kingdoms who was recorded in Huangfu Mi's Biographies of Exemplary Women.
