= Qiao =

Qiao may refer to:

- Qiao (surname), a common pronunciation for some Chinese surnames, such as 喬 and 橋.
- Qiao (橋), Chinese character for "bridge".
- Qiao (譙), a location in ancient China which corresponds to present-day Bozhou, Anhui. also an ancient Chinese surname.
