= Piaggio Ciao =

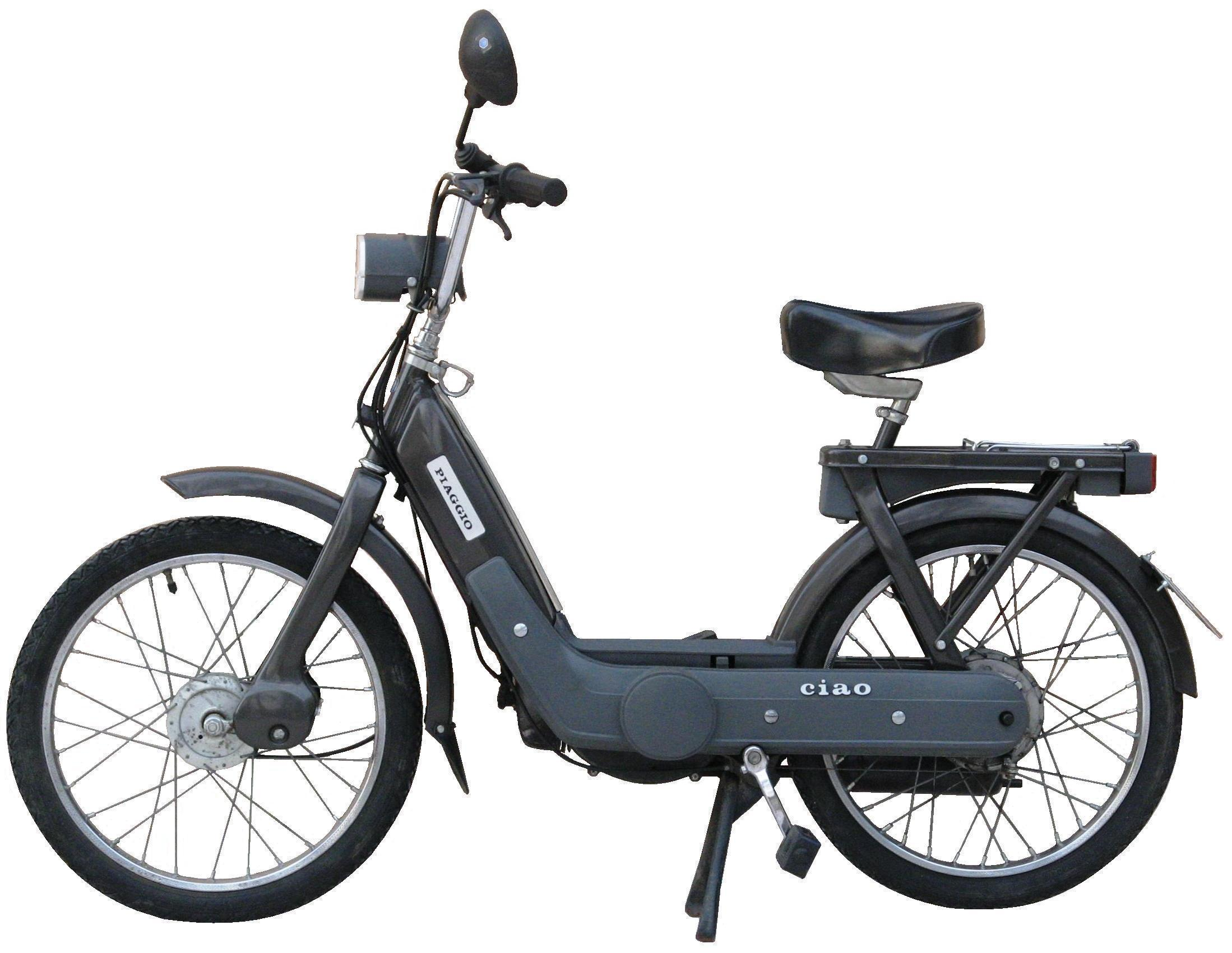
- Manufacturer: Piaggio
- Also called: Vespa Ciao
- Production: 1967–2006
- Assembly: Pontedera, Italy; Arganda del Rey, Spain
- Class: Moped
- Engine: 49 cm³ air-cooled two-stroke
- Tires: 2" × 17"
- Dimensions: L: 1.630 m W: 0.670 m H: -
- Seat height: 1.040 m
- Weight: 40 kg (dry)
- Fuel capacity: 2.8 L (of which 0.5 L reserve)
- Fuel consumption: 47.3 km/L at 45 km/h, 61.4 km/L at 30 km/h
- Related: Piaggio Boss; Piaggio Boxer; Piaggio Si; Gilera CBA; Gilera CB1

The Piaggio Ciao (ciao means "hi" or "bye" in Italian) is a family of moped produced by Piaggio from 1967 through 2006.

== Specification ==
It has a rigid rear, and a leading-link front suspension. Some models include a sprung seat-post. The engine and drive-train are cleanly enclosed, similar to Piaggio's scooters. The Ciao uses a belt drive, unlike most other mopeds which are chain driven. Some models have an automatic continuously variable transmission. Braking is by front and rear drums. Power for the lamps, horn, and ignition is from a magneto; there is no battery. However, models with turning signal lights were equipped with a 6-volt battery for the blinkers to function. On newer models, the plastic fuel cap also serves as a measuring cup for the 2% oil-fuel mixture.

In some countries, such as Canada in the 1970s, it was branded as the Vespa Ciao.

Model variants include:

- Ciao SC (round saddle rack, saddle and suspension seatpost; light at the rear fender; racks are not removable; chrome fenders)
- Ciao L (square saddle rack, and only semi-suspension; light at the rear fender; racks removable)
- Ciao P (square saddle rack, and only semi-suspension; light at the rear rack; racks removable)
- Ciao Px (round saddle rack, saddle and suspension seatpost; light at the rear rack; luggage racks are not removable)
- Ciao Mix (round saddle rack, saddle and suspension seatpost; light at the rear rack; luggage racks are not removable; oil tank in the luggage racks)

== Derivatives ==
Piaggio also produced some stablemates to the Ciao: The Piaggio Si, with a telescopic front fork suspension, the Piaggio Grillo, with 14-inch wheel, Piaggio Boxer, the Si's ancestor, the Piaggio Boss, with kick starter, mass button and speedometer and the Piaggio Bravo with a telescopic front fork and a shock absorber rear suspension.

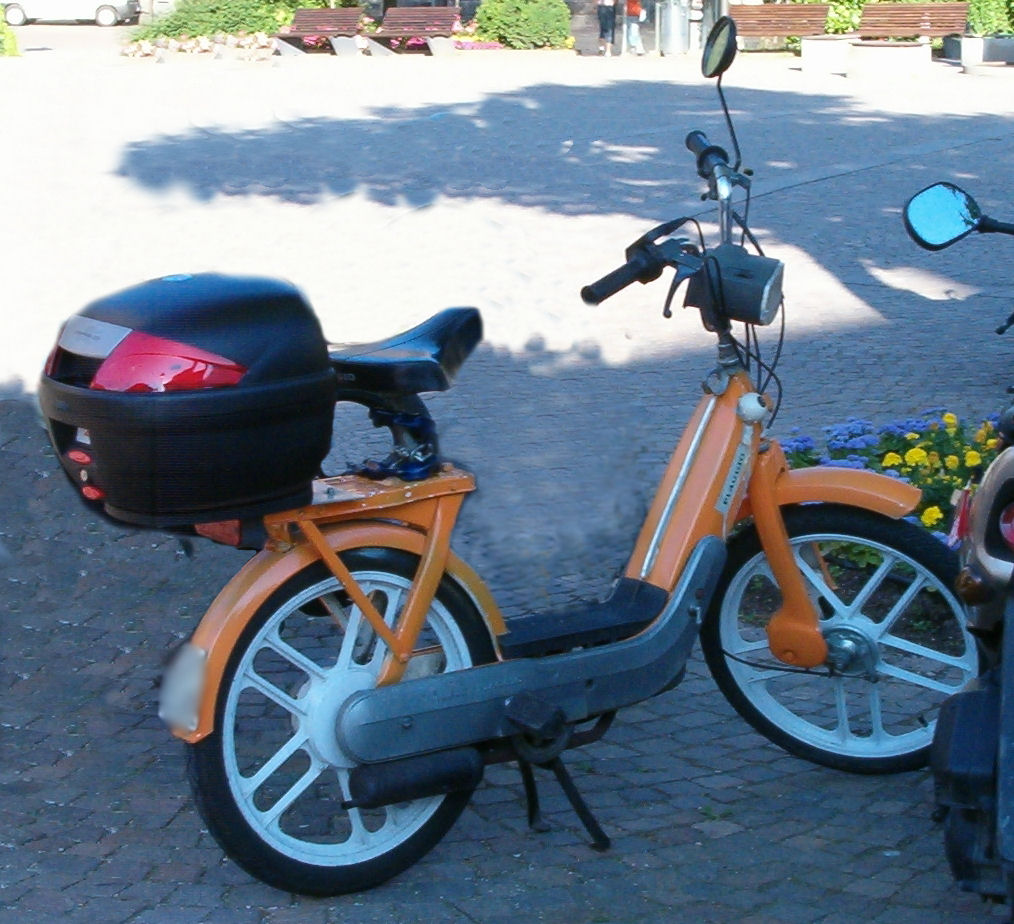
1982 Piaggio Ciao
