= Jiao Xiaoping =

Chinese politician

- 焦小平

Deputy Commander of the Xinjiang Production and Construction Corps
- In office June 2022 – February 2023
- Commander: Xue Bin

Personal details
- Born: July 1966 (age 59–60) China
- Party: Chinese Communist Party (expelled in 2023)

Military service
- Allegiance: People's Republic of China
- Branch/service: People's Liberation Army Ground Force
- Years of service: 2022–2023
- Commands: Xinjiang Production and Construction Corps

Jiao Xiaoping (Chinese: 焦小平; pinyin: Jiāo Xiǎopíng; born July 1966) is a former Chinese financial expert and politician. He was investigated by China's top anti-graft agency in February 2023. Previously he served as deputy commander of the Xinjiang Production and Construction Corps.

== Biography ==
Jiao was born in July 1966, at the dawn of the Cultural Revolution. He assumed various administrative and political roles in divisions and departments of the Ministry of Finance of the People's Republic of China before being appointed deputy director of the China Clean Development Mechanism Fund.

In June 2022, he was transferred to the Xinjiang Production and Construction Corps and appointed deputy commander.

== Investigation ==
On 5 February 2023, Jiao was placed under investigation for "serious violations of laws and regulations" by the Central Commission for Discipline Inspection (CCDI), the party's internal disciplinary body, and the National Supervisory Commission, the highest anti-corruption agency of China. On July 27, he was expelled from the CCP and dismissed from public office. He was detained by the Supreme People's Procuratorate on August 16. On December 4, he was indicted on suspicion of accepting bribes.

On 17 May 2024, Jiao pleaded guilty to bribery during his first trial at Fifth Intermediate People's Court of Chongqing Municipality. Prosecutors accused him of taking advantage of his different positions between 2000 and 2022 to seek profits for organizations and individuals in matters concerning obtaining loans and securing employment, in return, he accepted money and property worth 67.43 million yuan (about 9.5 million U.S. dollars). On December 23, he was handed a 14-year prison term plus a fine of 5 million yuan for taking bribes. His illegal gains will be confiscated.
