= Chen Dong (Song dynasty) =

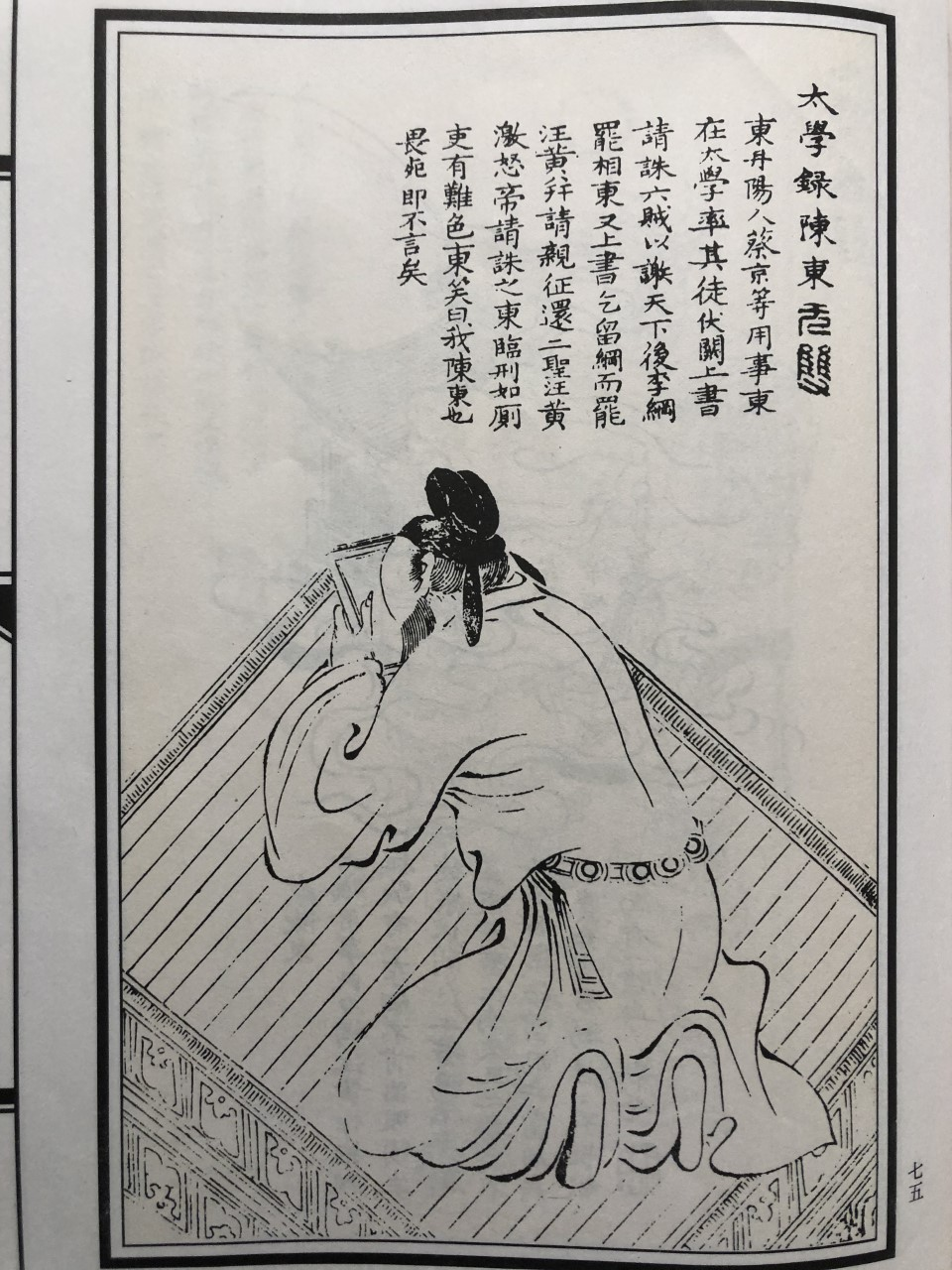
Chen Dong as depicted in the Wu Shuang Pu (無雙譜, Table of Peerless Heroes) by Jin Guliang

Chen Dong (traditional Chinese: 陳東; simplified Chinese: 陈东; pinyin: Chén Dōng; 1086–1127), courtesy name Shaoyang (少陽), was an academic of the Song dynasty martyred for his opposition to political corruption. He came to the Imperial University in the capital city of Kaifeng in 1103, and ten years later he got a job as scholar at the Imperial academy. Chen Dong stood up against Song policy and in 1125 helped lead a rebellion against six corrupt officials. He has been called the voice of public opinion because the voice of the teachers and students were in agreement with the voice of the people and soldiers. Chen Dong was executed in 1127 around the time the city fell to the Jurchen people, ending the Northern Song dynasty. A year following his death, Chen Dong was rehabilitated, and in 1134 was granted a posthumous ministerial office by Emperor Gaozong.

The History of Song, the official, government sanctioned history of the Song dynasty, published 1346, carries a biography of Chen Dong in chapter 455, as part of its biographical series on "Those Loyal to Righteousness". Chen Dong is depicted in the Wu Shuang Pu (無雙譜, Table of Peerless Heroes) by Jin Guliang. The images and poems for this book were widely spread and reused, including on porcelain works.
