= Jiao Xian =

Chinese hermit (c. 220 CE)

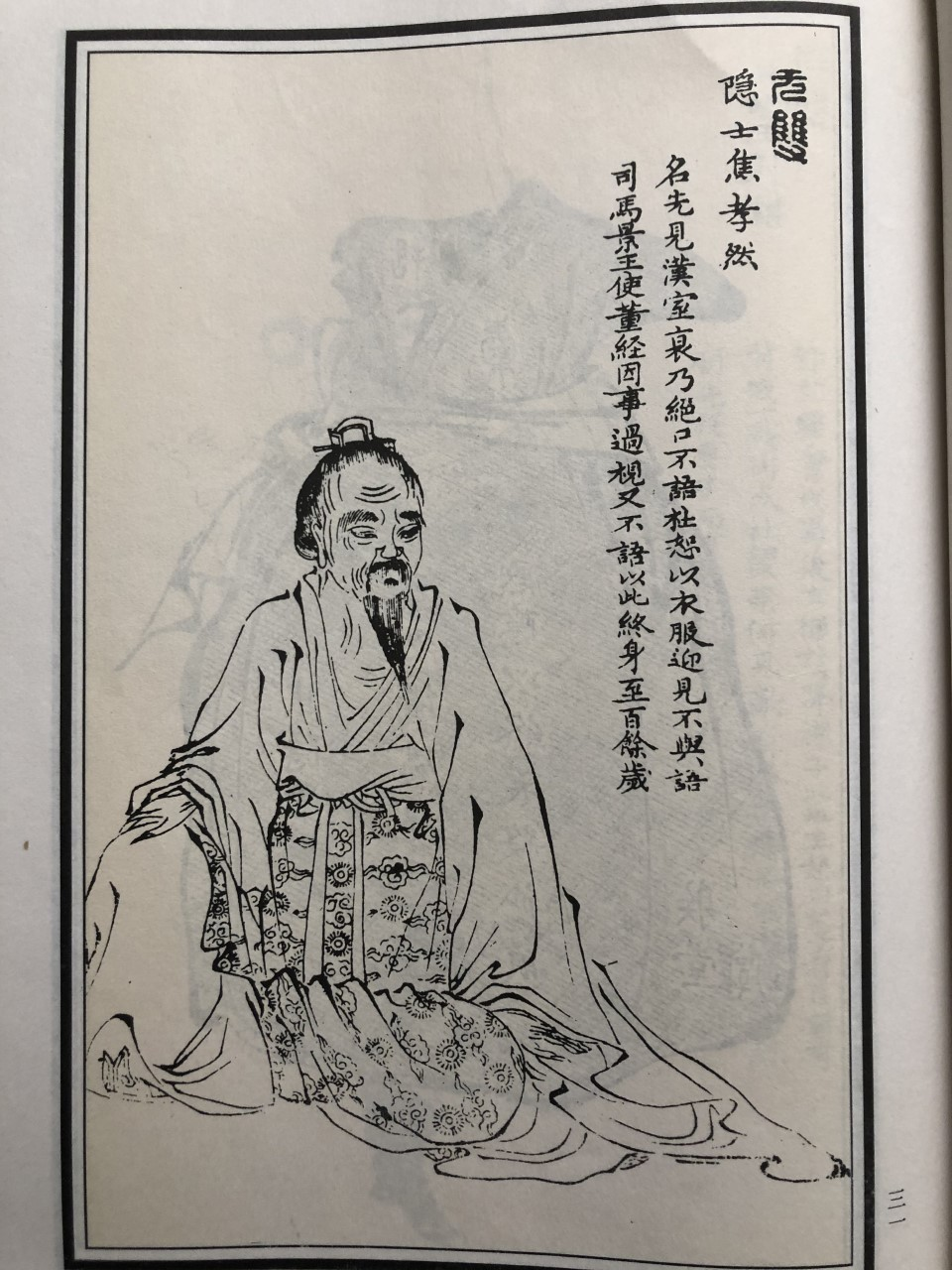
Jiao Xiaoran as depicted in the Wu Shuang Pu (無雙譜, Table of Peerless Heroes) by Jin Guliang

Jiao Xian (Chinese: 焦先, active around 220 CE), courtesy name Xiaoran (孝然) or Xiaoruo (孝若), also called Jiao Guang (Chinese: 焦光), was a Chinese hermit.

== Life ==
Jiao was born in Hedong and lived in Guanzhong (关中) during the Han dynasty and Three Kingdoms period. Early in his life Jiao, began to live as a recluse, wearing no clothes and sleeping on the ground. He spoke to no one for an entire year. He lived a sober life and became a hermit. It has been said that he lived for more than 100 years. He is said to have made his living from cutting firewood. Every day, he would head into the mountains, cut some wood and deliver it to the gate of one house in the village. He would repeat this each day, until he had covered the whole village, and would then start again. If people saw him, they would set down a mat and some food, and Jiao would eat in silence, and then depart.

== Bibliography ==
Jiao's life story made him a character in the Weilüe, written by Yu Huan. There is a record of Jiao in the Records of the Three Kingdoms (Volume 11) "Guan Ning Biography" by Chen Shou and another in the Taiping Guangji by Li Fang. Huangfu Mi also described Jiao's behaviour.

Jiao is depicted in the Wu Shuang Pu (無雙譜, Table of Peerless Heroes) by Jin Guliang. The images (and poems) for this 17th century book were widely copied and reused, including on porcelain art or objects.
