= Zhu Gui (printmaker) =

Chinese printmaker (woodcut carver) of the Qing period

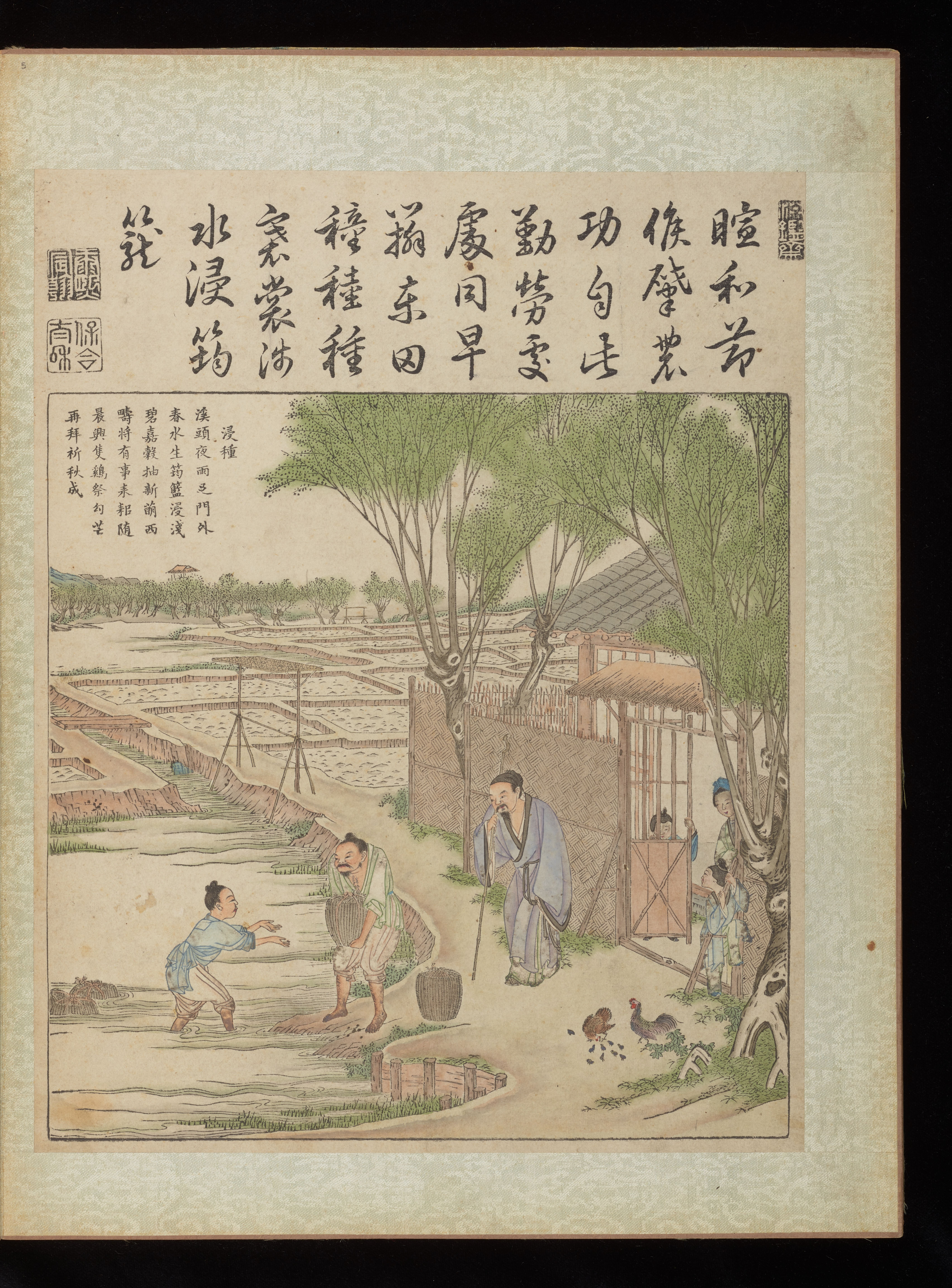
Page from the Imperially commissioned illustrations of agriculture and sericulture (Tilling and Weaving) (1696). Woodblock print by Zhu Gui after designs by Jiao Bingzhen. Chester Beatty Library

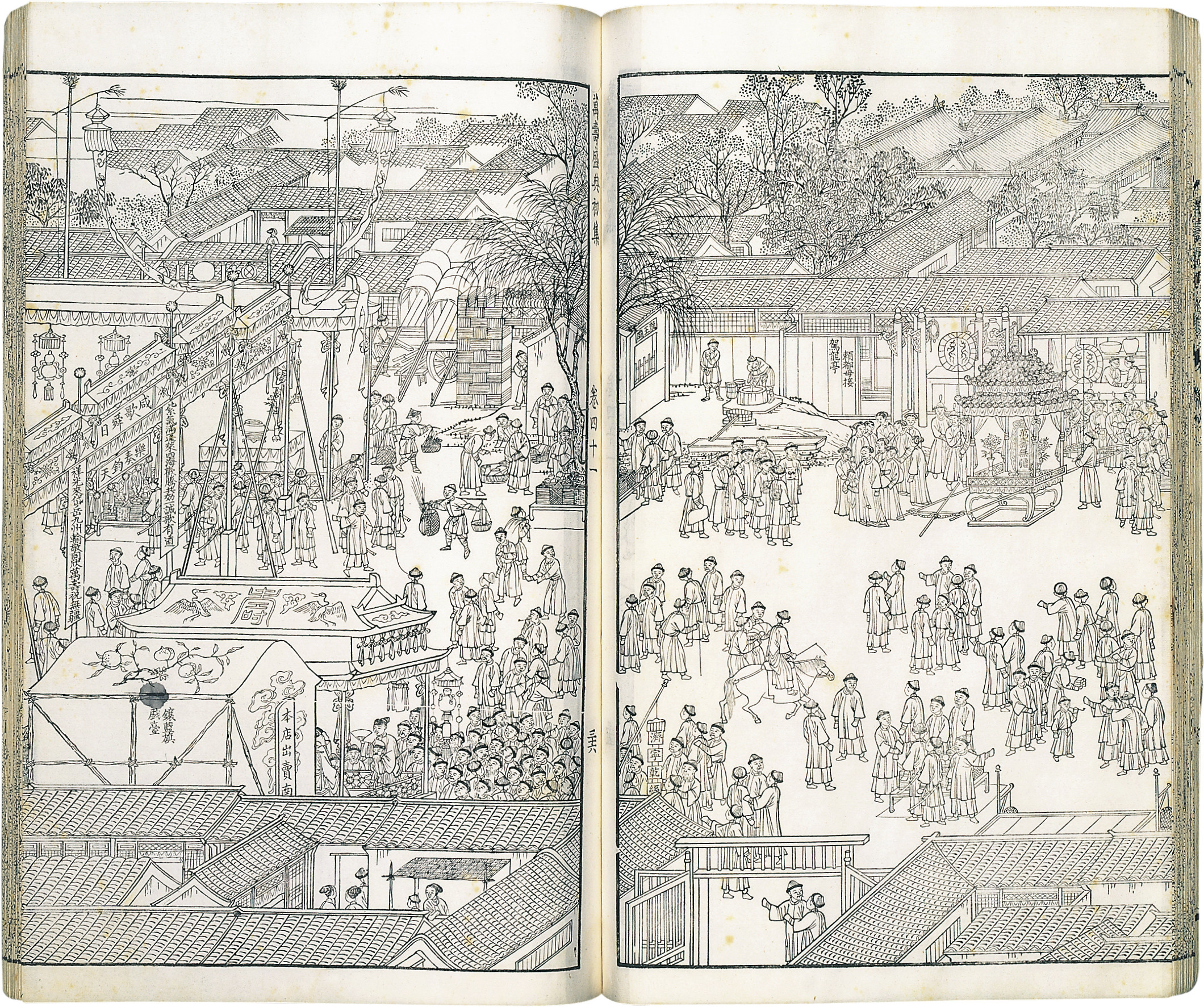
Double page from the "Illustrations of the Grand Ceremony Celebrating Longevity", 1716-1717. Bibliothèque nationale de France

Zhu Gui (朱圭, c. 1644–1717) was a wood carver from Qing Dynasty, born in Suzhou, Jiangsu. Zhu assisted Jin Guliang (金古良) in creating the Wu Shuang Pu (1694), a book with pictures of forty heroes. He also made the 46 paintings of "Tilling and Weaving" (1696), by order of the Kangxi Emperor. Furthermore he made the 146 pictures in the "Book of the ceremony of longevity" (1717), this original 1717 version of the longevity ceremony is stored in the Palace Museum in the Forbidden City in Beijing in China.

== Works ==
- Portraits of 24 officials in the Lingyan Pavilion is a book with pictures made in 1668.
- Wu Shuang Pu by Jin Guliang is a book from 1694 with pictures and poems of 40 peerless Chinese heroes from the Han dynasty to the Song dynasty. Zhu Gui helped Jin draw some of the pictures. These pictures are still used on porcelain.
- In the period from 1696 till 1713 Zhu Gui worked for the Emperor. Like other emperors, Kangxi ordered works depicting "Tilling and Weaving", 23 of tilling and 23 of weaving. Zhu Gui did the engraving together with Mei Yufeng (梅裕鳳), Jiao Bingzhen did the painting. These pictures are still used on porcelain.
- In 1712 Zhu Gui worked together with Mei Yufeng making 36 pictures of the summer palace.
- "Illustrations of the Grand Ceremony Celebrating Longevity" is a series of 146 running pictures with a total length of about 50 meters, this book is made in 1717 and Zhu Gui did the engraving designed by Wang Yuanqi and Wang Yiqing This book is part of the Siku Quanshu.
