= Lai Zehua =

Chinese politician (born 1965)

- 赖泽华

Party Branch Secretary of the Guangdong Provincial Ecology and Environment Department
- In office October 2021 – May 2022

Personal details
- Born: September 1965 (age 61) Zijin County, Guangdong, China
- Party: Chinese Communist Party
- Education: Sun Yat-sen University

Chinese name
- Simplified Chinese: 赖泽华
- Traditional Chinese: 賴澤華
Transcriptions
Standard Mandarin
- Hanyu Pinyin: Lài Zéhuá

Lai Zehua (Chinese: 赖泽华; born September 1965) is a former Chinese politician who spent his entire career in his home-province Guangdong. As of May 2023 he was under investigation by China's top anti-corruption agency. Previously he served as party branch secretary of the Guangdong Provincial Ecology and Environment Department.

Born in Zijin County, Guangdong, he worked in government after college in 1988. He was mayor of Zhaoqing in 2015, party secretary and chairman of the People's Congress in 2016, and eventually party secretary of Zhongshan and chairman of the People's Congress in 2019.

He was a representative of the 19th National Congress of the Chinese Communist Party.

== Early life and education ==
Lai was born in Zijin County, Guangdong, in September 1965. In 1984, he enrolled at Sun Yat-sen University, where he majored in law.

== Career ==
He began his political career in 1988, and joined the Chinese Communist Party (CCP) in September 1990.

He started his career from Heyuan Municipal People's Government Office after university in 1988. In May 2004 he was admitted to member of the CCP Heyuan Municipal Committee, the city's top authority, and was promoted to vice mayor in January 2012. In February 2015, he was named acting mayor of Zhaoqing, confirmed in April that same year. He rose to become party secretary, the top political position in the city, in March 2016. He concurrently served as chairman of Zhaoqing Municipal People's Congress. In October 2019, he was appointed party secretary of Zhongshan, concurrently serving as chairman of the People's Congress. He was chosen as party branch secretary of the Guangdong Provincial Ecology and Environment Department in October 2021.

== Downfall ==
On 12 May 2023, he was suspected of "serious violations of laws and regulations" by the Central Commission for Discipline Inspection (CCDI), the party's internal disciplinary body, and the National Supervisory Commission, the highest anti-corruption agency of China.

Government offices
Preceded by Guo Feng	Mayor of Zhaoqing; 2015–2016	Succeeded by Chen Xudong
Party political offices
Preceded by Xu Pinghua	Communist Party Secretary of Zhaoqing; 2016–2019	Succeeded by Fan Zhongjie
Preceded by Chen Xudong	Communist Party Secretary of Zhongshan; 2019–2021	Succeeded by Guo Wenhai
