= Jiao Lansheng =

Chinese politician

- 焦兰生

Chairman of Yangjiang Municipal People's Congress
- In office January 2019 – May 2021
- Preceded by: Chen Xiaoshan
- Succeeded by: Feng Ling

Communist Party Secretary of Yangjiang
- In office October 2018 – May 2021
- Deputy: Wen Zhanbin (mayor)
- Preceded by: Chen Xiaoshan
- Succeeded by: Lin Daoping

Mayor of Zhongshan
- In office May 2016 – October 2018
- Party Secretary: Chen Rugui; Chen Xudong
- Preceded by: Chen Liangxian
- Succeeded by: Wei Weihan

Personal details
- Born: May 1962 (age 64) Lanzhou, Gansu, China
- Party: Chinese Communist Party (1985–2023; expelled)
- Education: Xi'an University of Architecture and Technology; Sun Yat-sen University

Chinese name
- Simplified Chinese: 焦兰生
- Traditional Chinese: 焦蘭生
Transcriptions
Standard Mandarin
- Hanyu Pinyin: Jiāo Lánshēng

Jiao Lansheng (Chinese: 焦兰生; born May 1962) is a former Chinese politician who spent his entire career in south China's Guangdong province. As of November 2022 he was under investigation by China's top anti-corruption agency. Previously he served as party secretary of Yangjiang and mayor of Zhongshan.

He is a delegate to the 13th National People's Congress.

== Early life and education ==
Jiao was born in Lanzhou, Gansu, in May 1962, while his ancestral home in Changyuan, Henan. After resuming the college entrance examination, in 1978, he was accepted to Xi'an Institute of Metallurgical Architecture (now Xi'an University of Architecture and Technology), where he majored in industrial and civil buildings.

== Political career ==
After university in 1982, Jiao worked at China Nonferrous Metals Third Construction Company and then the Zhuhai Real Estate Development Management Office.

Jiao joined the Chinese Communist Party (CCP) in February 1985. He got involved in politics in October 1993, when he was appointed deputy director of the Zhuhai Municipal Infrastructure Land Development Management Center. He assumed various administrative and political roles in Zhuhai, including director of Zhuhai Environmental Protection Bureau (2001–2004), director of Zhuhai Lingang Industrial Zone Management Committee (2004–2006), director of Zhuhai Gaolangang Economic Zone Management Committee (2006–2008), party secretary of Doumen District (2008–2012), chairman of the People's Congress of Doumen District (2008–2012), and secretary of the Political and Legal Affairs Commission of the CCP Zhuhai Municipal Committee (2011–2014). He also served as vice mayor of Yangjiang from December 2013 to April 2016.

In April 2016, he was named acting mayor of Zhongshan, confirmed in the following month.

In October 2018, he was recalled to Yangjiang. He was appointed party secretary, concurrently serving as chairman of its People's Congress.

== Investigation ==
On 7 November 2022, he has been placed under investigation for "serious violations of laws and regulations" by the Central Commission for Discipline Inspection (CCDI), the party's internal disciplinary body, and the National Supervisory Commission, the highest anti-corruption agency of China. Wei Weihan, his successor in Zhongshan, was disgraced on 19 April 2024.

On 6 April 2023, he was expelled from the CCP and removed from public office. He was detained by the Dongguan People's Procuratorate on May 8.

Government offices
Preceded by Chen Liangxian	Mayor of Zhongshan; 2016–2018	Succeeded by Wei Weihan
Party political offices
Preceded by Chen Xiaoshan	Communist Party Secretary of Yangjiang; 2018–2021	Succeeded by Lin Daoping
Assembly seats
Preceded by Chen Xiaoshan	Chairman of Yangjiang Municipal People's Congress; 2019–2021	Succeeded by Feng Ling
