= Ciao Ciao (film) =

- Theatrical release poster
- Directed by: Keith Albert Tedesco
- Written by: Keith Albert Tedesco; Antonella Axisa; Mikhail Basmadjian; Chris Dingli
- Produced by: Keith Albert Tedesco; Fabrizio Fenech
- Starring: Antonella Axisa; Chris Dingli; Mikhail Basmadjian
- Cinematography: Keith Albert Tedesco
- Edited by: Fabrizio Fenech
- Music by: Dominic Carmelo Darmanin
- Production companies: Lampa Stampa Films; Roughcut Pictures
- Release dates: March 19, 2025 (Saint Julian's); March 28, 2025 (Malta)
- Running time: 95 minutes
- Country: Malta
- Languages: Maltese; English
- Budget: €75,000

Ciao Ciao is a 2025 Maltese satirical comedy-drama film co-written, co-produced, filmed and directed by Keith Albert Tedesco. It stars Antonella Axisa, Chris Dingli and Mikhail Basmadjian accompanied by Simone Spiteri, Kevin Naudi, Ruth Borg, Ryan Debattista, Katrina Lupi and Matthew Sant Sultana. It follows two couples who meet at a dinner party, but the tension between them will grow when secrets are revealed.

== Synopsis ==
Two old friends meet for a friendly dinner accompanied by their partners where secrets come to light and their friendship is put at stake.

== Cast ==
- Antonella Axisa as Charlotte
- Chris Dingli as Sam
- Mikhail Basmadjian as Victor
- Simone Spiteri as Jessica
- Kevin Naudi as Michael
- Ruth Borg as Cri
- Ryan Debattista as Leonard
- Katrina Lupi as Chloe
- Matthew Sant Sultana as Detective

== Production ==
Principal photography began in early September 2024 and lasted 10 days in Malta.

== Release ==
The film premiered on March 19, 2025, in Eden Cinema, Saint Julian's, and was then commercially released on March 28, 2025, in Maltese theaters.
