= Ciao (website) =

Ciao.co.uk
- Website type: Review site
- Available in: English; French; Spanish; German; Dutch; Italian; Swedish
- Owner: LeGuide Group
- Website: ciao.co.uk
- Registration: Unavailable
- Current status: Active

Ciao was a European-based online-shopping portal with websites in the United Kingdom, France, Spain, Germany, the Netherlands, Italy and Sweden. In February 2008, the company launched an American version of the site, Ciao.com. The site allowed registered users to write reviews and share opinions on a wide range of products to assist other consumers.

These reviews were available to the general public to help consumers, but also rated by other Ciao users on their usefulness on a scale ranging from exceptional to off-topic. Until December 2017, authors earned payments when their reviews were read by other members. Members could also receive money through online surveys and referring friends. On 27 November 2017, Ciao announced that from 1 December all payments would be stopped. In February 2018, Ciao was closed down. Ciao was free to join.

As well as offering reviews, the site also provided price comparison (working with merchants and agencies who provided data feeds) and allowed the user to click through and purchase products.=

== Microsoft Purchases Ciao ==
Microsoft made an offer of $486 million in late August 2008 to purchase Greenfield Online, the owner of Ciao GmbH and Ciao, Inc. Representatives from Microsoft said the purchase was primarily made to boost the company's Internet search and e-commerce business in Europe.

== LeGuide Group Acquires Ciao ==
Since the acquisition in March 2012, Ciao strengthens the portfolio of LeGuide Group (listed on Alternext board of NYSE Euronext Paris – ISIN code: FR0010146092), founded in 1998 and operating in 14 European countries through a multi-site strategy of online shopping guides, comparison websites, shopping search engines and platforms for consumer ratings. LeGuide Group surrounds a brand portfolio, including LeGuide.com, choozen, dooyoo.com, pikengo, shopwahl.de and Ciao. CEO of Shopping Guide GmbH and LeGuide Group is Olivier Sichel since July 2012.
