= Huizhou University =

University in Guangdong Province, China

Coordinates: 23.03805°N 114.42194°E

Huizhou University (Chinese: 惠州学院; pinyin: Huìzhōu xuéyuàn; lit. 'Huizhou College') is a provincial undergraduate university in Huizhou City, Guangdong Province, southern China.

== History ==
The school was established in 1921 as the Guangzhou Municipal Normal School.

In March 2000 it was granted the status of provincial undergraduate university and began to offer undergraduate programs.

== Campus ==
The campus of Huizhou University is approximately 1.71 square kilometres (0.66 sq mi) in total area, which includes 406,400 square metres (4,374,000 sq ft) of facilities and 131,000 square metres (1,410,000 sq ft) of greenery. It has been awarded the title of "Garden School" by the Huizhou Municipal Government for five consecutive years.

The institution recently upgraded its equipment and the new library holds over one million volumes.

== Departments ==
The institution is structured into 16 departments:

Electronic Science, Textiles and Clothing Manufacture, Chemical Engineering, Computer Science, Economics and Management, Architecture and Civil Engineering, Tourism, Fine Arts, Mathematics, Life Sciences, Physical Education, Foreign Languages, Music, Chinese Literature, Politics and Law, and Ideological and Political Theory on Teaching.

In addition, there is an Adult Education College and 17 institutes including an Architecture Programming and Design Institute, Higher Education Laboratory, Sushi Culture Institute and Dongjiang River Culture Institute.

=== Programs ===
The university has 42 undergraduate programs:

Physical Education, Electronic Information Science and Technology, Electrical Engineering and Automation, Electrical Information Engineering, Electronic Information Engineering, Clothing Design and Engineering, Chemical Engineering and Technology, Applied Chemistry, Computer Science and Technology, Software Engineering, Network Engineering, International Economics and Trade, Marketing, Financial Management, Logistics Management, Auditing, Civil Engineering, Architecture, Engineering Management, Tourism Management, Geosciences, Art and Design, Fine Arts Science, Mathematics and Applied Mathematics, Information Management and Systems, Horticulture, Biotechnology, Bioscience, Physical Education, Socio-Physical Education, English, Japanese, Musicology, Chinese Language and Literature, Radio and Television Journalism, Teaching Chinese as a Second Language, Administrative Management, Law, History, and Education in Ideology and Politics.

It offers 18 diploma programs:

Accounting, Clothing Design, Clothing Engineering, Marketing, Tourism Management, Business Japanese, Musical Education, P.E., Legal Affairs, Secretary for International Business, Gardening Technology, Construction Engineering Technology, Administrative Management, Economic Management, Chemical and Technical Application, Fine Arts Education, Computer Education, and English Education. These programs cover nine discipline categories.

== Activities ==
Huizhou University publishes the Huizhou University Journal.

Several students took part in a study titled "University students' attitudes towards Japan in China," which indicated that Japan's official development assistance did little to change attitudes of Chinese students toward the Japanese.

In inter-institutional cooperation, Huizhou University has collaborated with Sun Yat-sen University to build a Chemical Technology Research and Development Center and has worked with the French Lectra System (Shanghai) Co., Ltd to develop a digital simulation laboratory.

The university has hosted academic conferences and exchanges, such as when it hosted a Sino-Canadian Education and Technology Seminar with the participation of the University of Toronto. It has also hosted renowned pianists Norman Lee of Hong Kong and Ned Kirk, professor of music and chair of the Music Department at Saint Mary's University in Winona, Minnesota.

The school has taken part in exchanges with Jamestown College, Capilano University and City University of Macau.

== Students and staff ==
The school has more than 12,000 diploma and degree students, 5,800 mature students and over 2,000 online external students registered.

The total number of staff is 544 teachers, of whom 54 hold the title of professor and 161 associate professor; out of those 544, 68 hold a doctorate and 279 a master's degree.

Huizhou University sends exchange students abroad each year. Students taking part in these exchanges have gone to the University of Nebraska at Omaha, the University of Houston–Downtown, Minnesota State University Moorhead, and Bunkyo University in Japan.
