= Azienda Trasporti Livornese =

Defunct Italian transport company

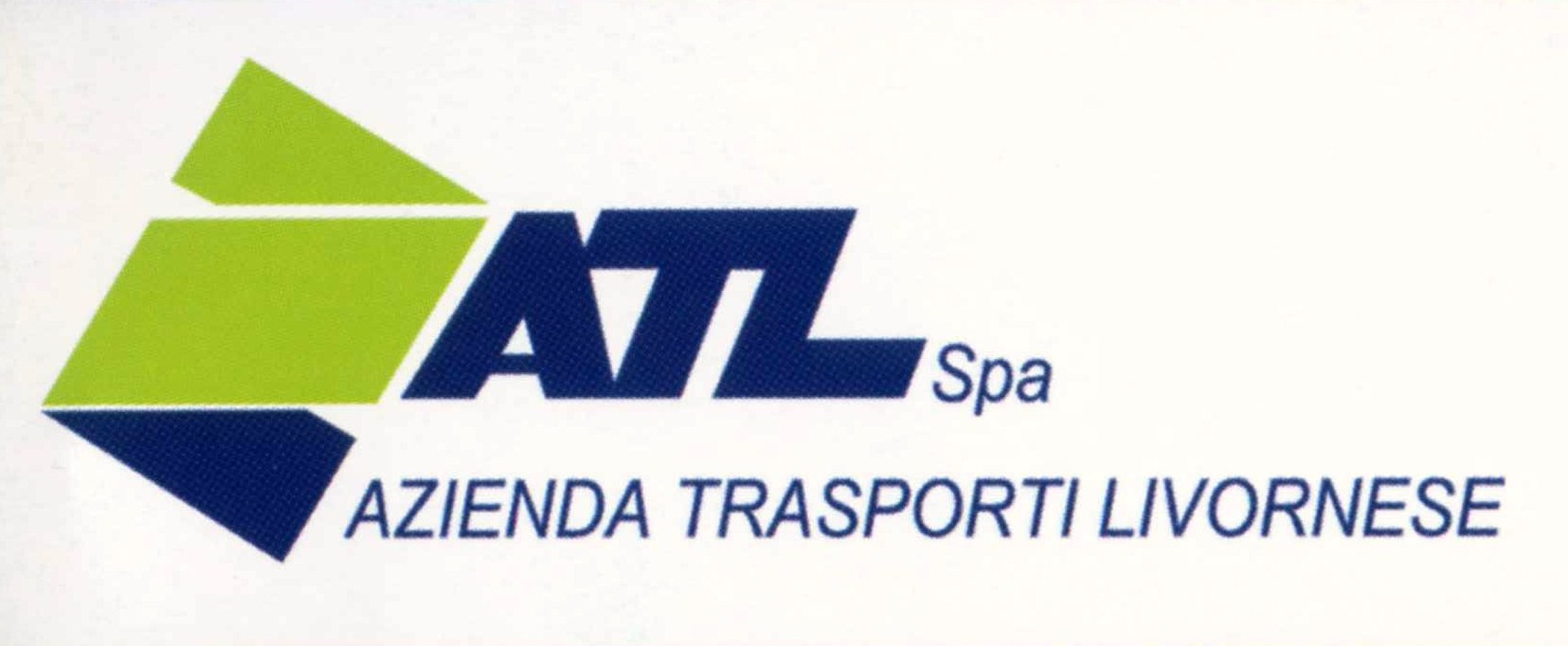
- Founded: 9 October 1996
- Ceased operation: 21 October 2012
- Headquarters: Livorno
- Service area: Province of Livorno
- Service type: Public transportation
- Chief executive: Maurizio Giovanni Picchi
- Website: web.archive.org/web/20050205010156/http://www.atl.livorno.it/indextab.asp

Azienda Trasporti Livornese, known as ATL, was a public company that managed the local public transport in Livorno and its province including Elba.

== History ==
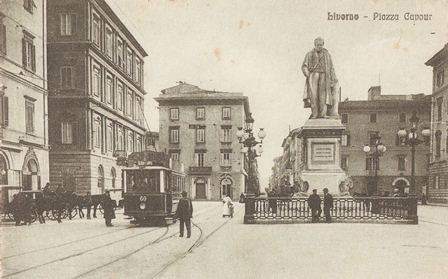
Electric tramway in Livorno

The decision to provide Livorno with a public transport system dates back to 1875 with a horse-drawn tram line. The line was inaugurated on 22 May 1881 and the route, following the course of the sea-promenade, developed from the city center to Ardenza.

On 13 October 1897 the first electric tram was activated and the line started from the San Marco Station to Antignano; at the end of 1906 those with animal traction were definitively replaced by electric tram. On 15 May 1908 was formed a new company and the management passed to the Società Livornese a Trazione Elettrica (SLTE); on 19 August was inaugurated the Montenero funicular in order to connect, lower Montenero to the Sanctuary, placed on the highest part of the hill. In 1930 the tramways network consisted of nine lines and in January 1935 the service was gradually transformed into a trolleybus system.

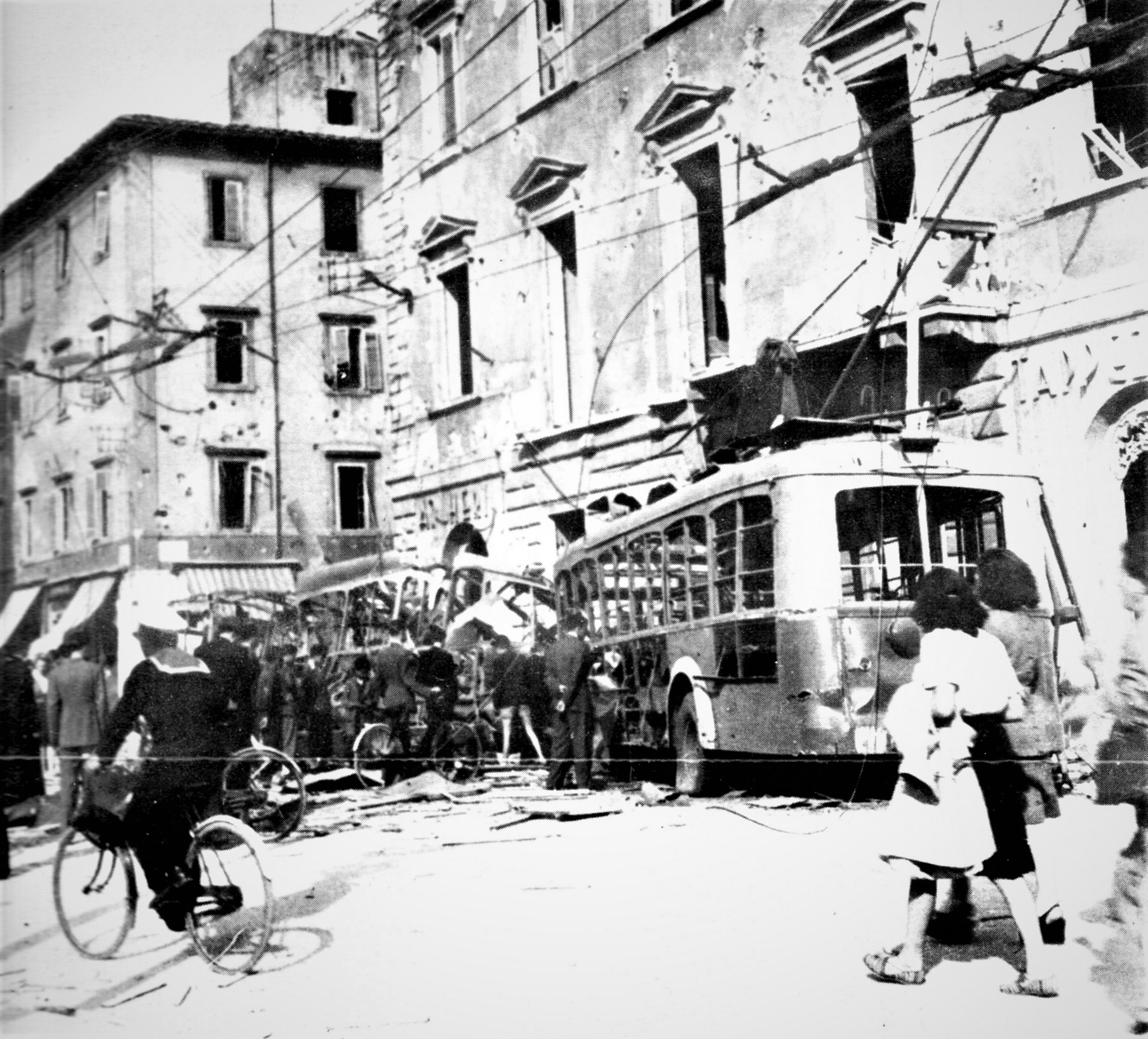
STU Fiat 656 trolleybus damaged after the June 1943 bombing

The Società Trasporti Urbani (STU), a company of the FIAT group, was formed for restructuring the trolleybus service with a fifteen years contract; the program was completed planning eight lines and reducing progressively to two those of the tramways.

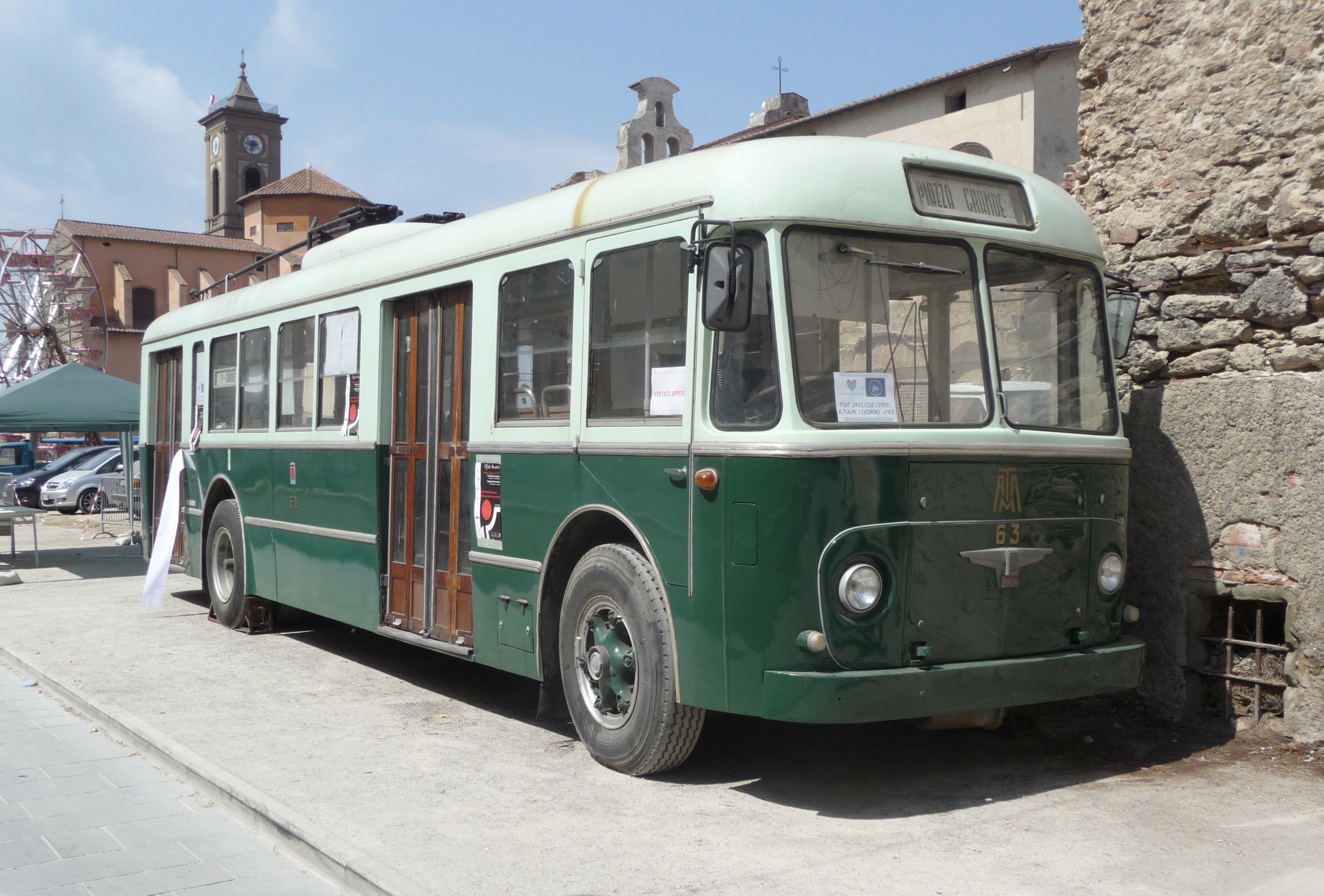
ATAM Fiat 2411 trolleybus

The disastrous bombing of Livorno in the Second World War caused extensive damage to the public transport system. After the war a council resolution approved, on 15 October 1949, to entrust the management of the trolleybus network to Azienda Trasporti Autofiloviari Municipale (ATAM) just formed for the occurrence. In 1960 the buses were introduced in service, bringing to a lower use of the trolleybuses to a fewer longest routes. In 1974, because to the oil crisis, the ATAM Board of Directors decided to dismantle the entire trolley system in order to reduce the electric energy consumption.

The ATAM management ended on 31 December 1978 and the following day the urban transport was succeeded by Azienda Consorziale Interprovinciale Trasporti (ACIT), which merged the public transport of Pisa and Livorno. ACIT, being the largest public transport company in Tuscany, revealed enormous structural limitations by borrowing beyond forecasts. The inevitability financial collapse determined the division of the Company into two separate companies, the Azienda Trasporti Livornese (ATL) in Livorno and the Azienda Pisana Trasporti (APT) in Pisa, starting from 1 April 1987. ATL tried to meet the new market needs and assumed a more efficient and economical structure becoming Società per Azioni.

On 21 October 2012 ATL was liquidated and the activities and assets merged into the newly formed Compagnia Toscana Trasporti Nord (CTTNord).

== Services ==
Azienda Trasporti Livornese developed its service not only in the city of Livorno but was extended to the urban services in Cecina, Rosignano Solvay and Elba Island as well as seven suburban lines departing from Livorno through the Province, six from Cecina, one from Collesalvetti and nine from Portoferraio. ATL was granted, by the municipality of Livorno, the management of a considerable number of city parking lots.

== Bus fleet ==
ATL managed the following buses as February 2005.

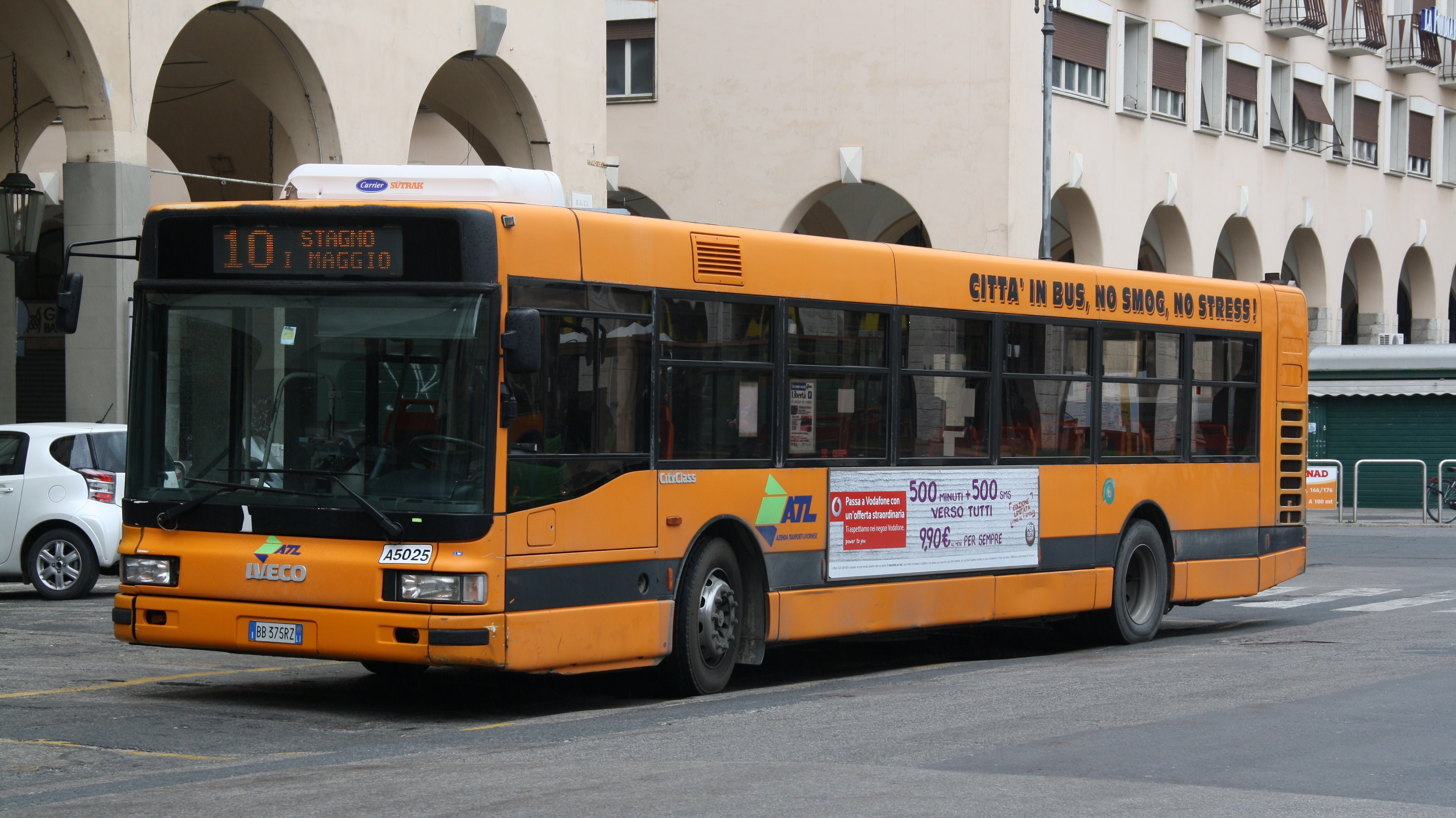
ATL Iveco CityClass

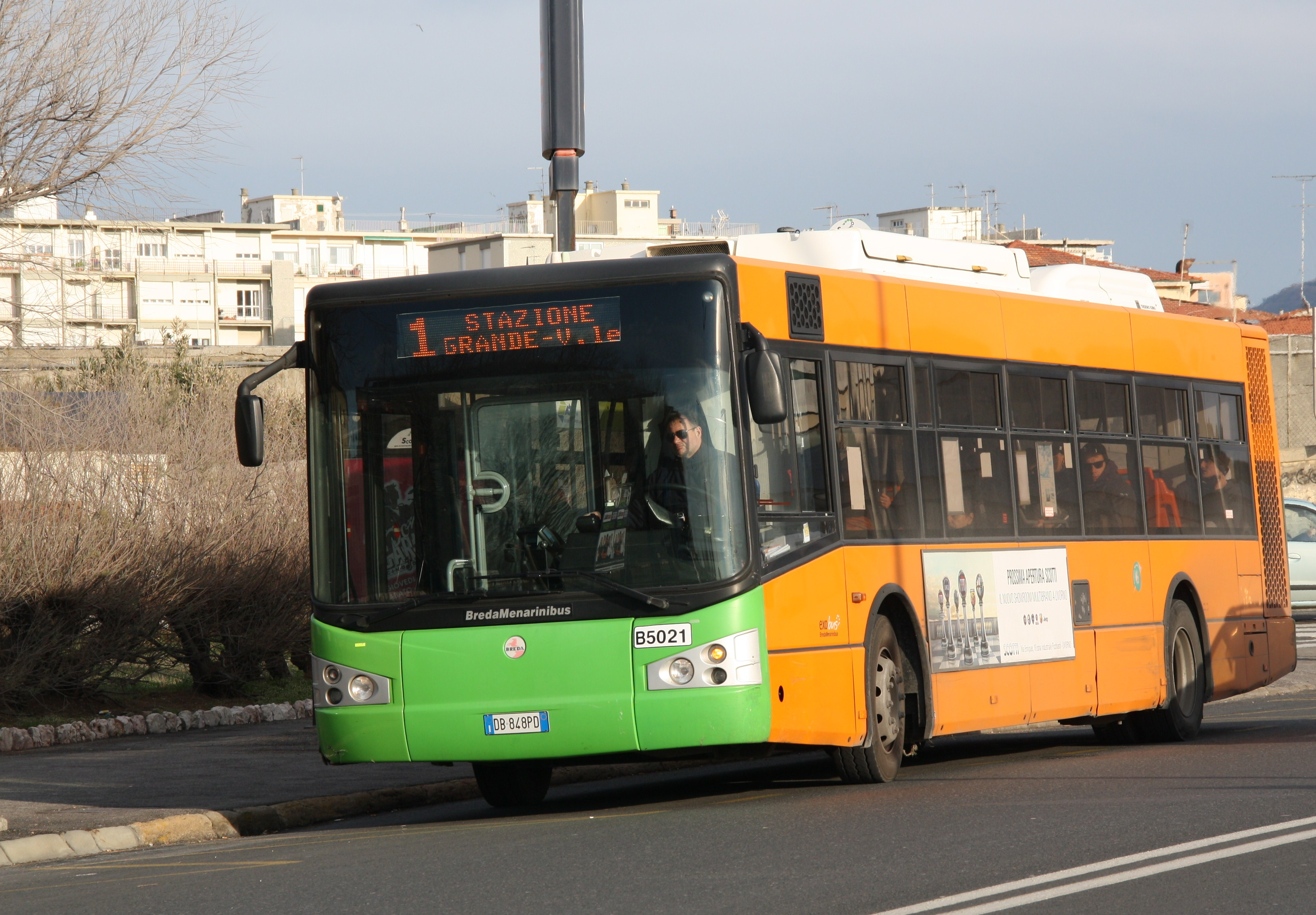
ATL BredaMenarinibus Monocar 240

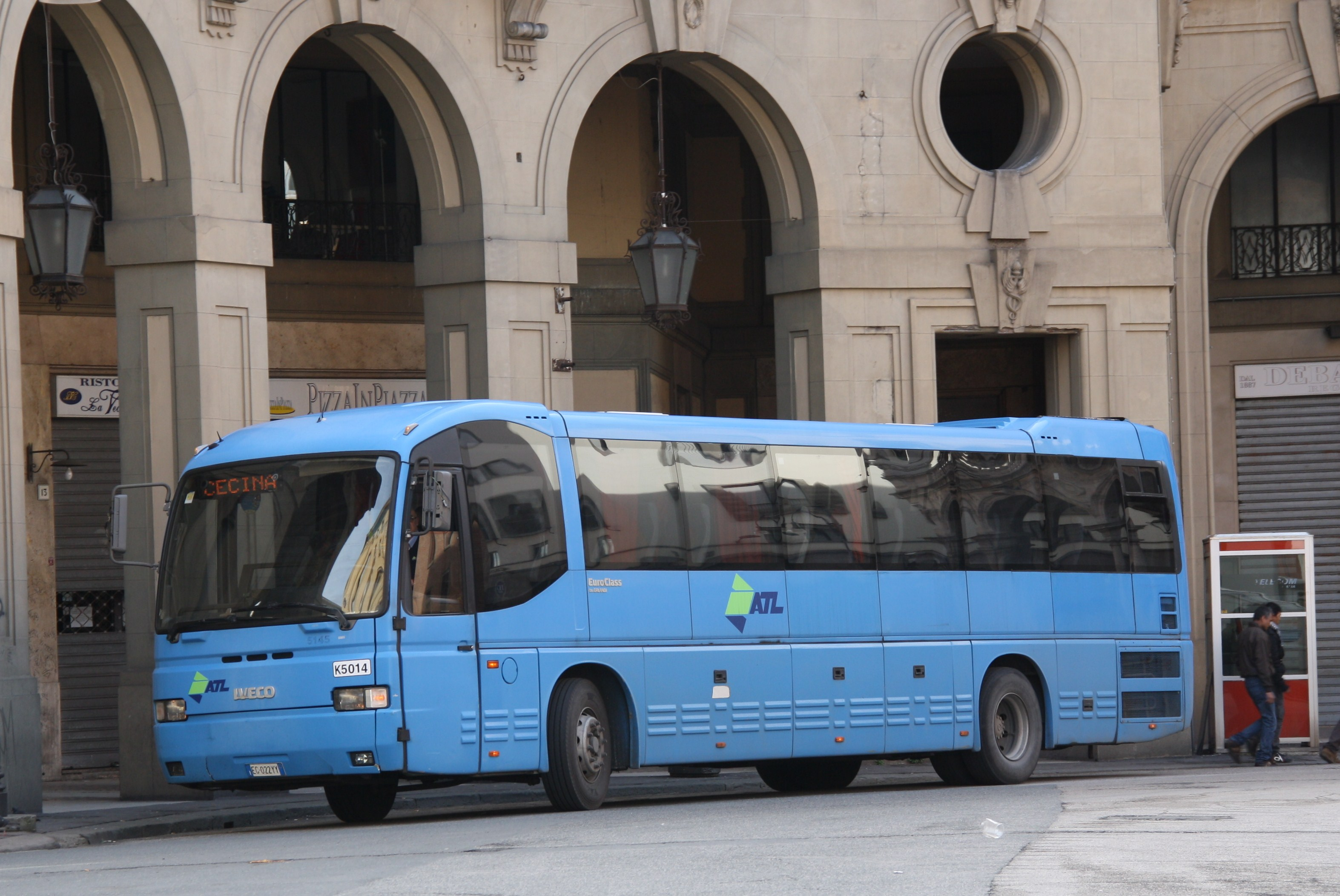
ATL Iveco EuroClass

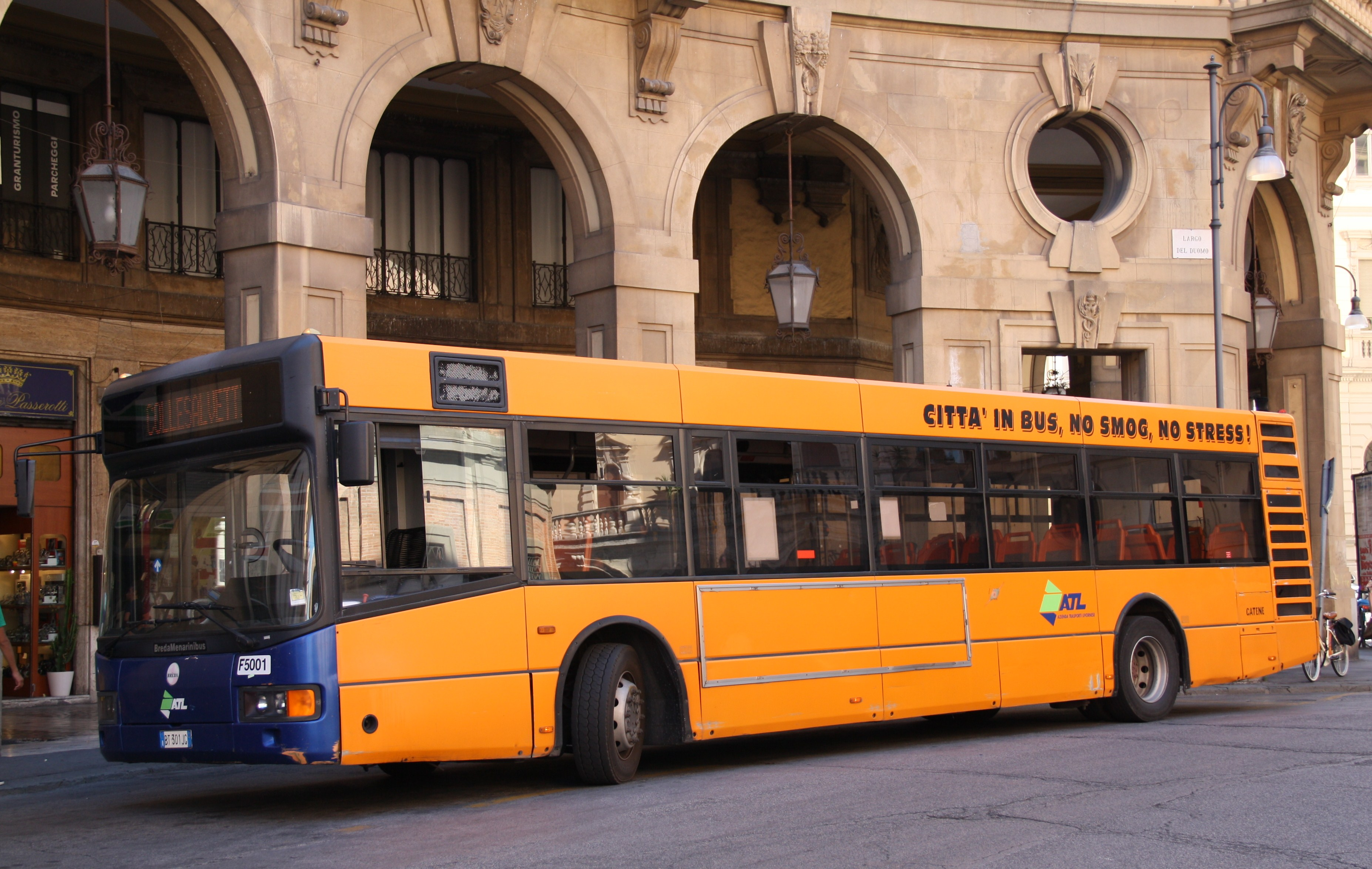
ATL suburban BredaMenarinibus Monocar 240

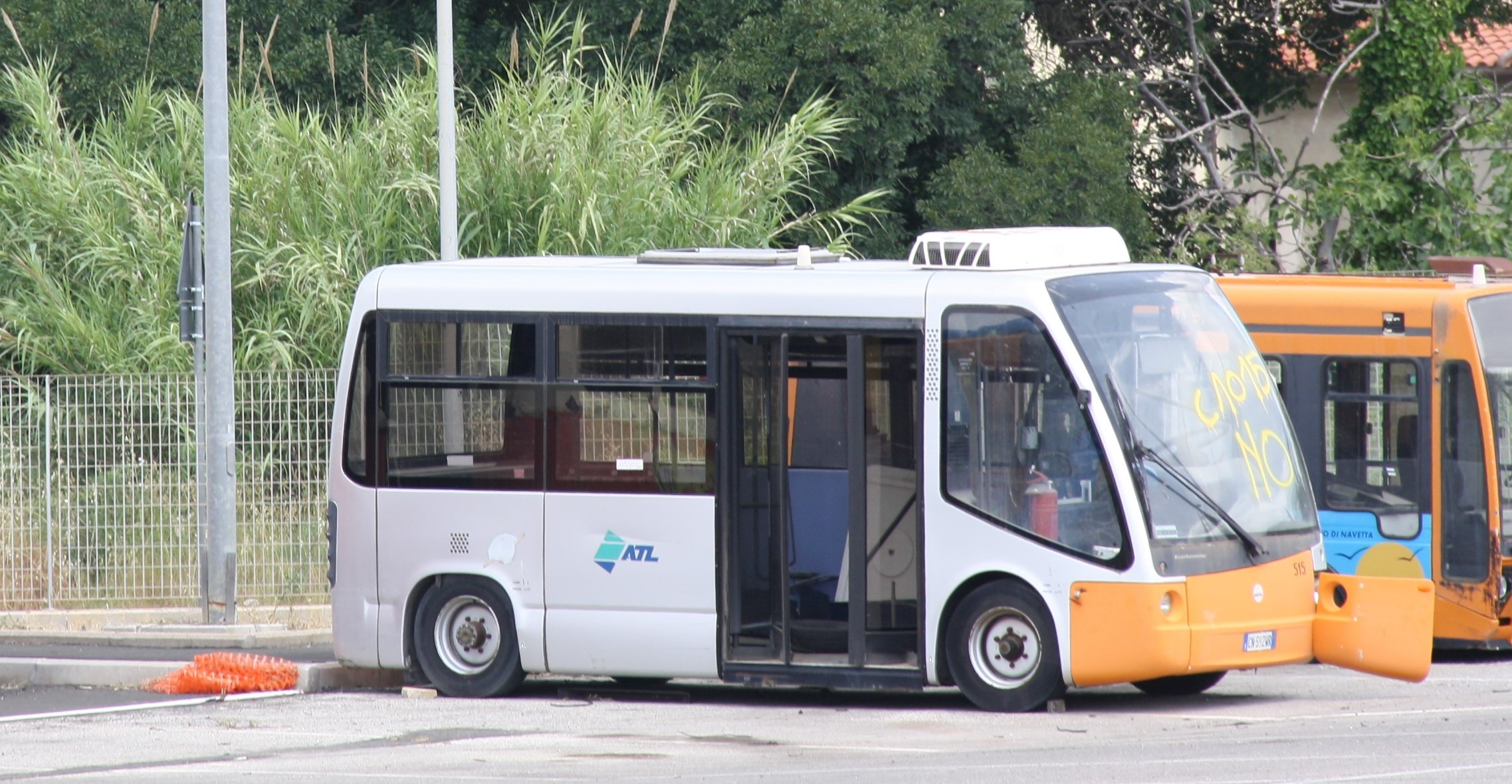
ATL BredaMenarinibus electric minibus Zeus

ATL Livorno Bus Fleet
Type of service	Name	Total
Urban	Bredabus 2001	10
Urban	BredaMenarinibus Monocar 231	19
Urban	BredaMenarinibus Monocar 240	9
Urban	Cacciamali TCC635	1
Urban	Cacciamali THM890U	6
Urban	Fiat 471	5
Urban	Fiat 480	12
Urban	Fiat 481	20
Urban	Fiat 490	17
Urban	Fiat 491	20
Urban	Inbus 177	24
Suburban	BredaMenarinibus Monocar 201	10
Suburban	BredaMenarinibus Monocar 240	5
Suburban	Cacciamali Iveco 49E12	2
Interurban	BredaMenarinibus Monocar 120	11
Interurban	BredaMenarinibus Monocar 201	8
Interurban	Fiat 343	6
Interurban	Fiat 380	13
Interurban	Inbus I330	7
Interurban	Iveco 370	28
Interurban	Mercedes-Benz AG814	9
Tourism	Fiat 380	2
Tourism	Iveco 370	3
Paratransit	Autodromo (CAM) Pollicino	11
Service	Piaggio Porter	25
Electric minibus	Tecnobus Gulliver	10
School bus	Iveco Carvin	4

== Livorno bus routes ==
ATL managed the following routes as February 2005:

=== Urban bus routes ===
- 1 – Stazione – Carducci – Grande – Ardenza Mare – Antignano Miramare
- 2 – Srazione – Garibaldi – Grande – Ardenza Terra – Montenero / Antignano
- 3 – Grande – Coteto – Leccia – Scopaia – Collinaia – Monterotondo
- 4 – Cimiteri – Grande – Marconi – Ospedale – Colline
- 5 – Torretta – Grande – Porto – Mazzini – Stadio – Ardenza Mare
- 6 – Cimiteri – Grande - Marradi – La Rosa – Scopaia
- 7 – Stazione – Artigianato - Cigna – Stazione
- 8N – Stazione – Ospedale - Grande – XI Maggio – Stazione
- 8R – Stazione – XI Maggio – Grande – Ospedale – Stazione
- 9 – Shangay – Cimiteri – Stazione – Ospedale – Coteto – Ardenza Mare
- 10 – Stagno – Pisana – Garibaldi – Grande
- 12 – Grande – Ospedale – Salviano – Valle Benedetta – Colognole
- 14 – La Rosa – Ardenza Terra – Castellaccio
- 15 – Grande – Ospedale – Le Sughere – Scopaia – La Leccia
- AMB – Stazione – Carducci – Grande – Marradi – La Rosa
- G – Grande – Montebello – Ardenza Mare – Montenero
- SPI – Stazione – Via Enriques

=== Electric Minibus Routes ===
These routes have been operated by electric Minibus Tecnobus Gulliver

- PB1 – Stazione Marittima – Cavour – Amedeo – Grande – Stazione Marittima
- PB2 – Stazione Marittima – Cappuccini – Cavour – Stazione Marittima
- PB3 – Stazione Marittima – Venezia – Grande – Mercati – Stazione Marittima

=== Night Bus Routes ===
- A – Stazione – Carducci – Grande – Ardenza Mare – Ardenza Terra – Garibaldi – Stazione
- B – Stazione – Garibaldi – Grande – Marradi - Ardenza Terra – Ardenza Mare – Grande – Carducci – Stazione

=== School Service ===
- C – Scuola Media Michelangelo
- LV – Liceo Enriques
- T – Scuola Media Micali Tesei
- XI – Scuola Media Bartolena – Via Bois

== Suburban routes ==
ATL managed the following Interurban routes as February 2005:

- 11 – Pisa – Marina di Pisa – Tirrenia – Calambrone – Livorno
- 12 – Pisa – San Piero – Tombolo – Livorno
- 21 – Livorno – Rosignano Solvay – Vada – Cecina
- 22 – Livorno Industriale – Collesalvetti – Santa Luce – Cecina
- 31 – Collesalvetti – Vicarello – Guasticce – Stagno – Livorno
- 32 – Livorno – Nugola – Parrane – Colognole
- 33 – Castelnuovo Misericordia – Gabbro – Livorno
- 41 – Castellina – Santa Luce – Lorenzana – Collesalvetti
- 42 – Castellina – Rosignano Solvay – Cecina
- 43 – Rosignano Marittimo – Rosignano Solvay – Cecina
- 43b – Nibbiaia – Castelnuovo – Rosignano Marittimo – Ospedale Cecina
- 51 – Cecina – California – Casale – Bibbona – Cecina
- 52 – Riparbella – San Pietro in Palazzi – Cecina
- 61 – Cecina – San Vincenzo – Venturina – Piombino

== ATL ProntoBus ==
ATL ProntoBus service was available on the entire urban network of the local public transport, calling a toll-free telephone number was possible to book a bus ride starting from the chosen bus stop to the desired destination. ProntoBus was a complementary, alternative and flexible booking accord to improve the service in some areas as: Castell'Anselmo, Cecina, Collinaia, Colognole, Collesalvetti, Monterotondo, Nugola, Parrana San Giusto, Parrana San Martino, Port of Livorno e Maritime Station.

== Montenero funicular ==
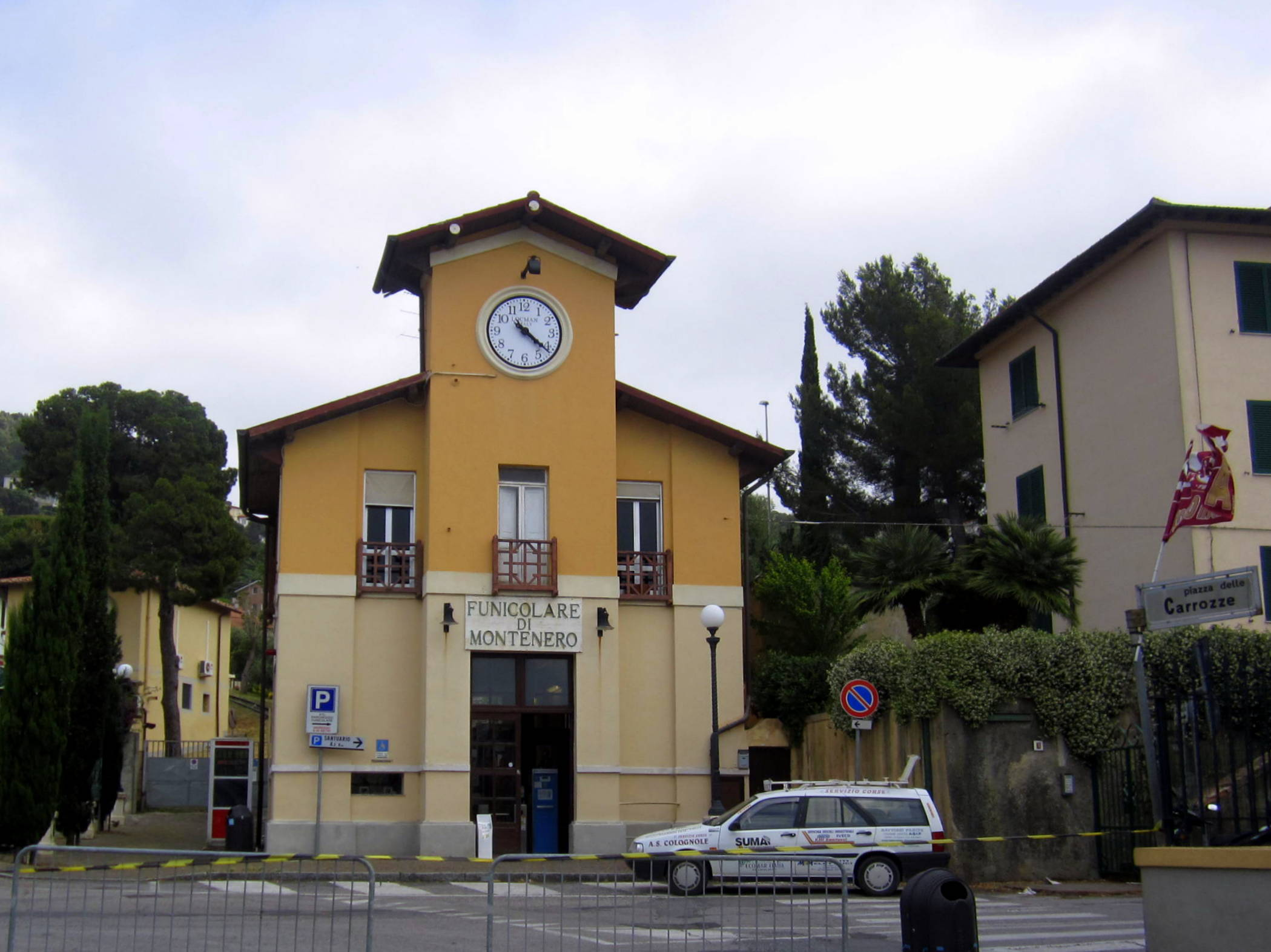
Montenero funicolar lower station

The plan to build the Montenero funicular, in order to link lower Montenero to the Sanctuary situated on the highest part of the hill, date back to June 1907 when was presented a project by the Società Livornese di Trazione Elettrica. The funicular was inaugurated on 19 August 1908 and was integrated by a tram line connecting the lower station to the city center.

Since 1972 the control of the plant passed, through the years, to several management as Comune di Livorno, ATAM, ATL, CTT Nord and finally Autolinee Toscane. It was then decided to carry out a general plan of improvement by replacing the old and heavy cable railway with lighter ones and changing completely the power plant. In 1990 the funicular was completely automated while in 2000 was installed a photovoltaic power supply, the only one in the world applied to a funicular.

The Montenero funicular has a transport capacity of 580 people per hour and has a user base of 250,000 passengers a year.

== See also ==
- Bus
- Public transport
- List of funicular railways
