= Mortaiolo =

- Frazione
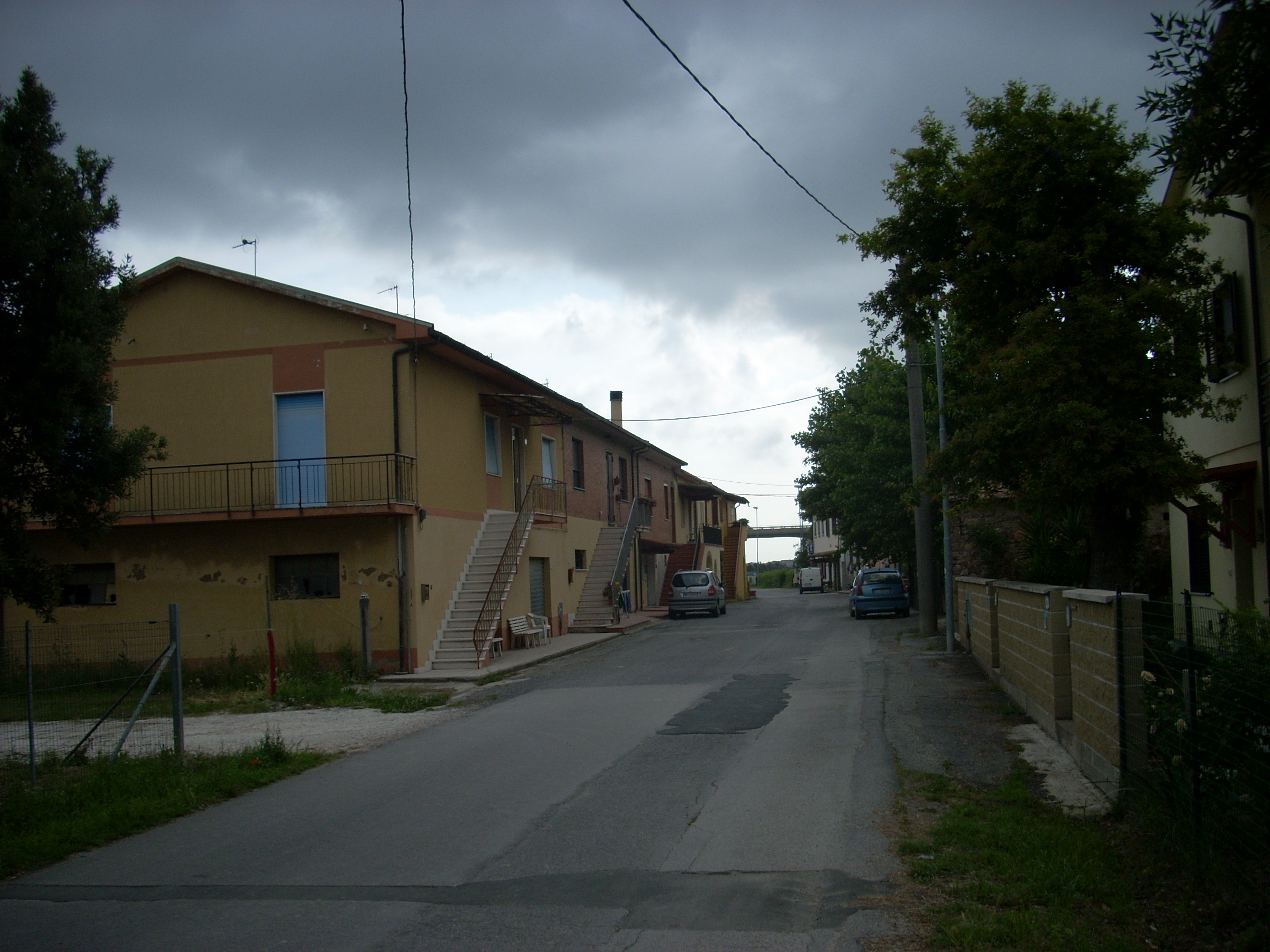

- Location of Mortaiolo in Italy
- Coordinates: 43°36′25″N 10°26′14″E
- Country: Italy
- Region: Tuscany
- Province: Livorno (LI)
- Comune: Collesalvetti
- Elevation: 4 m (13 ft)

Population (2011)
  - Total: 164
- Time zone: UTC+1 (CET)
  - Summer (DST): UTC+2 (CEST)
- Postal code: 57017
- Dialing code: (+39) 0565

Mortaiolo is a hamlet in the comune of Collesalvetti (province of Livorno, Italy), located near Vicarello.

The village, which has about 150 inhabitants, is located in a flat triangle between two rivers: the Scolmatore dell'Arno and River Tora.

The activity of those who reside in the area is agriculture.

An important contribution to the enhancement of the area was the Frescobaldi wine production, which owns a plantation called "The vineyards of Nugola" of over eighty hectares located in the small town, located in an old cottage near the river Tora.
