= Scolmatore dell'Arno =

Artificial flood control channel of the Arno river, Italy

Coordinates: 43°40′06″N 10°37′17″E

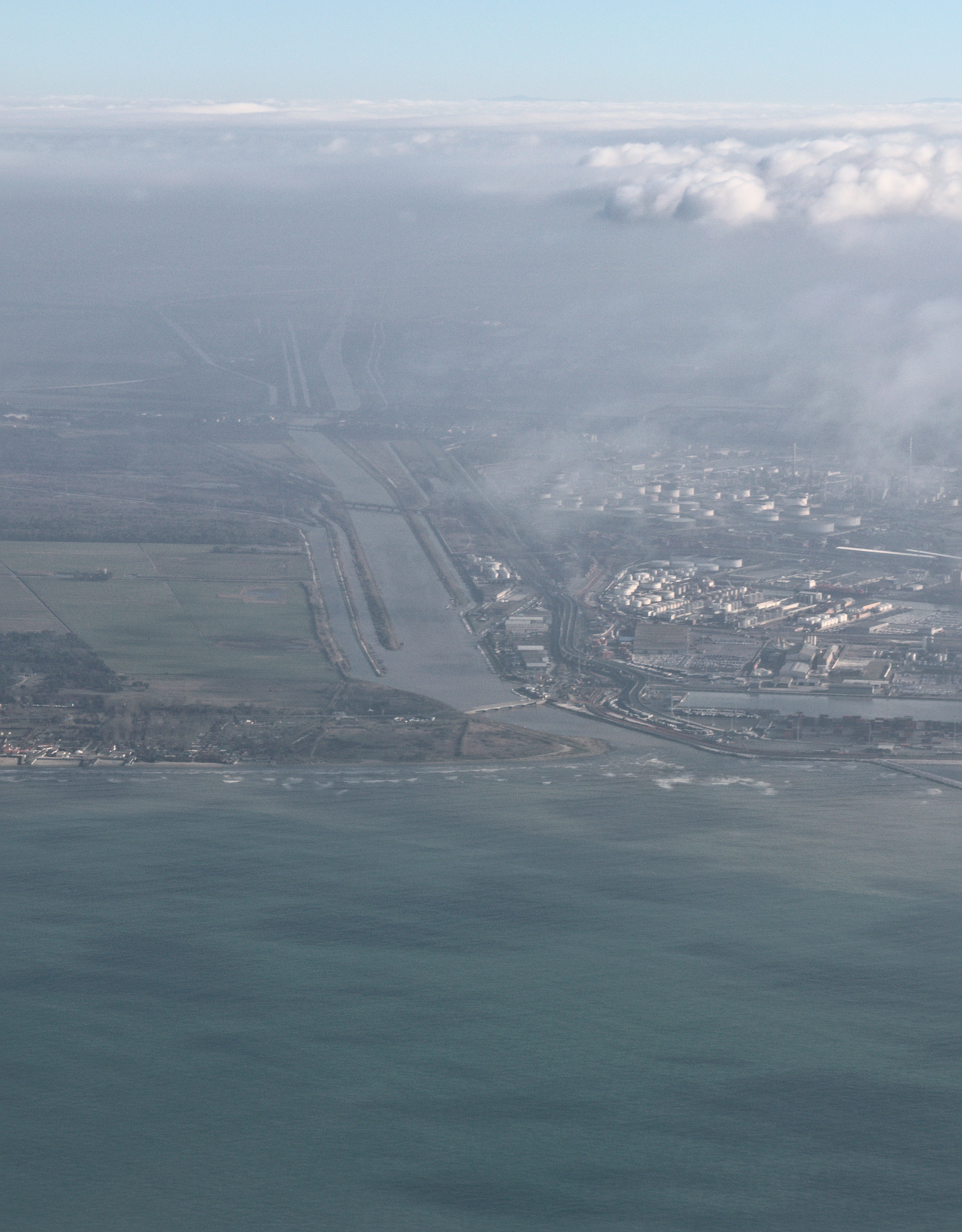
Mouth of the Scolmatore dell'Arno

Lo Scolmatore dell'Arno (The Arno floodway) is a 28 kilometers (17 mi) artificial flood control channel of the river Arno from Pontedera to the Ligurian Sea at Calambrone. As a consequence of the Arno flood of 1949, it was decided to start the construction of Scolmatore dell'Arno in 1954 at a cost of more than 10 billion lire of the time. The work was not completed in time for the disastrous flood of 1966 that, in addition to Florence, caused enormous damages in Pontedera and Pisa.

The floodway branches off the Arno 40 km from the river mouth (28 kilometers (17 mi) off the coast), just downstream Pontedera in a southwesterly direction, where the Arno proper continues towards northwest. The elevation at the bifurcation is 11 meters (36 ft), with the floodway's main ingate controlled by four gates that during normal water levels are closed, whereas a secondary and smaller ingate has free flow. The main channel has a total length of 28.3 kilometers (17.6 mi) and after a bend 8 kilometers (5.0 mi) downstream it continues almost straight towards the sea in a west-southwest direction.

The lower 6 kilometers (3.7 mi) forms the border between the provinces of Livorno and Pisa, and the mouth is situated between Calambrone and the seaport of Livorno, 11 kilometers (6.8 mi) south of Arno proper's mouth.

Scolmatore dell'Arno has a few branches, most notably is the much older Navicelli channel that connects less than one km from the mouth, although they lie parallel for further 2 kilometers (1.2 mi) before this channel turns towards northwest. Another few channels drain the area between Arno proper and the floodway. The main tributary is the River Tora that converges 9.5 kilometers (5.9 mi) from the mouth, just northwest of Mortaiolo. A minor tributary is the River Zannone that converges 19.5 kilometers (12.1 mi) from the mouth, just downstream the aforementioned bend of the channel. It is likely that the lower part of the channel at least partly occupies the original paths of Tora and Zannone. Both these rivers originates from the Pisan hills south of the Arno valley and the channel itself.

The floodway was designed for a capacity of 1,400 cubic meters (49,000 cubic feet) per second, which should handle 60% of the water flowing through Pisa, but this magnitude was never achieved and due to lack of maintenance the actual drainage of the channel is not more than 400 cubic meters (14,000 cubic feet) per second. A related problem is silt deposits of the seaport of Livorno that lies adjacent to the floodway's mouth.

== Plans for future navigability of the channel ==
There is an ongoing project to improve the navigability of the channel, intended exclusively for freight, excluding the use of tourist boating on the channel.

The navigability is developed to promote the connection between the dock in the port of Livorno and commercial activities at Guasticce and Vicarello, upstream at a distance of 13 kilometers (8.1 mi). It will use the current channel's connection to the port of Livorno, primarily through excavation of the channel to ensure a width of about 40 meters (130 ft) and a depth of at least 3.5 meters (11 ft), so as to allow the passage of boats and barges larger to the present.

The project also includes the raising of the deck of the bridge of the Aurelia road (by Stagno) and the construction of docks for loading and unloading of goods at Guasticce and Vicarello.
