= Carlo Servolini =

Italian painter

- Born: 5 April 1876; Livorno, Kingdom of Italy
- Died: 12 September 1948 (aged 72); Collesalvetti, Italian Republic
- Education: Accademia di Belle Arti di Firenze

Carlo Servolini (5 April 1876 – 12 September 1948) was an Italian artist from Livorno, in Tuscany. He worked in oils, water-colour, etching and lithography. He was the father of the wood engraver Luigi Servolini.

Servolini was born in Livorno on 5 April 1876. He studied in Florence at the Accademia di Belle Arti di Firenze and at the Scuola Professionale di Arti Decorative e Industriali (now the Liceo Artistico di Porta Romana), where he qualified as a teacher of drawing. He received help and advice from Guglielmo Micheli, a pupil of Giovanni Fattori, but did not become an imitator of the Macchiaiolo style.

He exhibited at the Biennale di Venezia in 1936, 1940 and 1942; his work was shown in Argentina, Germany, the United Kingdom and the United States.

Servolini died at Collesalvetti, in the province of Livorno, on 12 September 1948. In 2006, the comune of Collesalvetti established the Pinacoteca Comunale Carlo Servolini, a public gallery which houses works by Servolini and his Tuscan contemporaries, and also stages temporary exhibitions.
