= Castell'Anselmo =

- Frazione
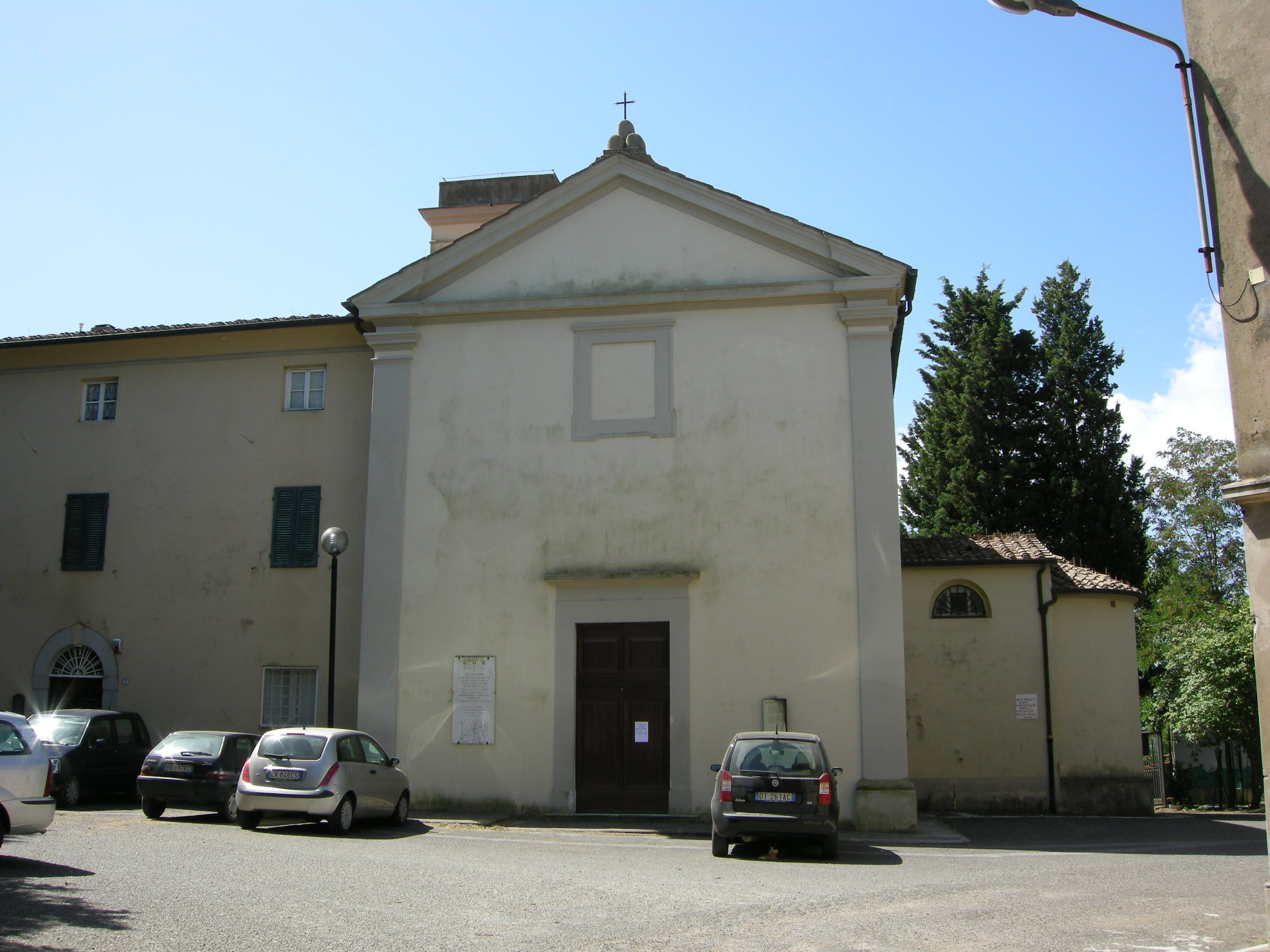
- The church of Santa Maria Assunta e San Lorenzo in Castell'Anselmo

- Location of Castell'Anselmo in Italy
- Coordinates: 43°33′13″N 10°28′00″E
- Country: Italy
- Region: Tuscany
- Province: Livorno (LI)
- Comune: Collesalvetti
- Elevation: 132 m (433 ft)

Population (2011)
  - Total: 234
- Time zone: UTC+1 (CET)
  - Summer (DST): UTC+2 (CEST)
- Postal code: 57017
- Dialing code: (+39) 0565

Castell'Anselmo is a village in Tuscany, central Italy, administratively a frazione of the comune of Collesalvetti, province of Livorno. At the time of the 2011 census its population was 234.

The village is about 16 km from Livorno and 5 km from Collesalvetti.

== Bibliography ==
- Emanuele Repetti (1841). "Castell'Anselmo". Dizionario Geografico Fisico Storico della Toscana. Florence.
