= Colognole =

Colognole may refer to:

- Colognole, Collesalvetti, a village in the province of Livorno, Italy
- Colognole, Pontassieve, a village in the Metropolitan city of Florence, Italy
- Colognole, San Giuliano Terme, a village in the province of Pisa, Italy
