= Laghetto di Sassi Neri =

Lake in Italy

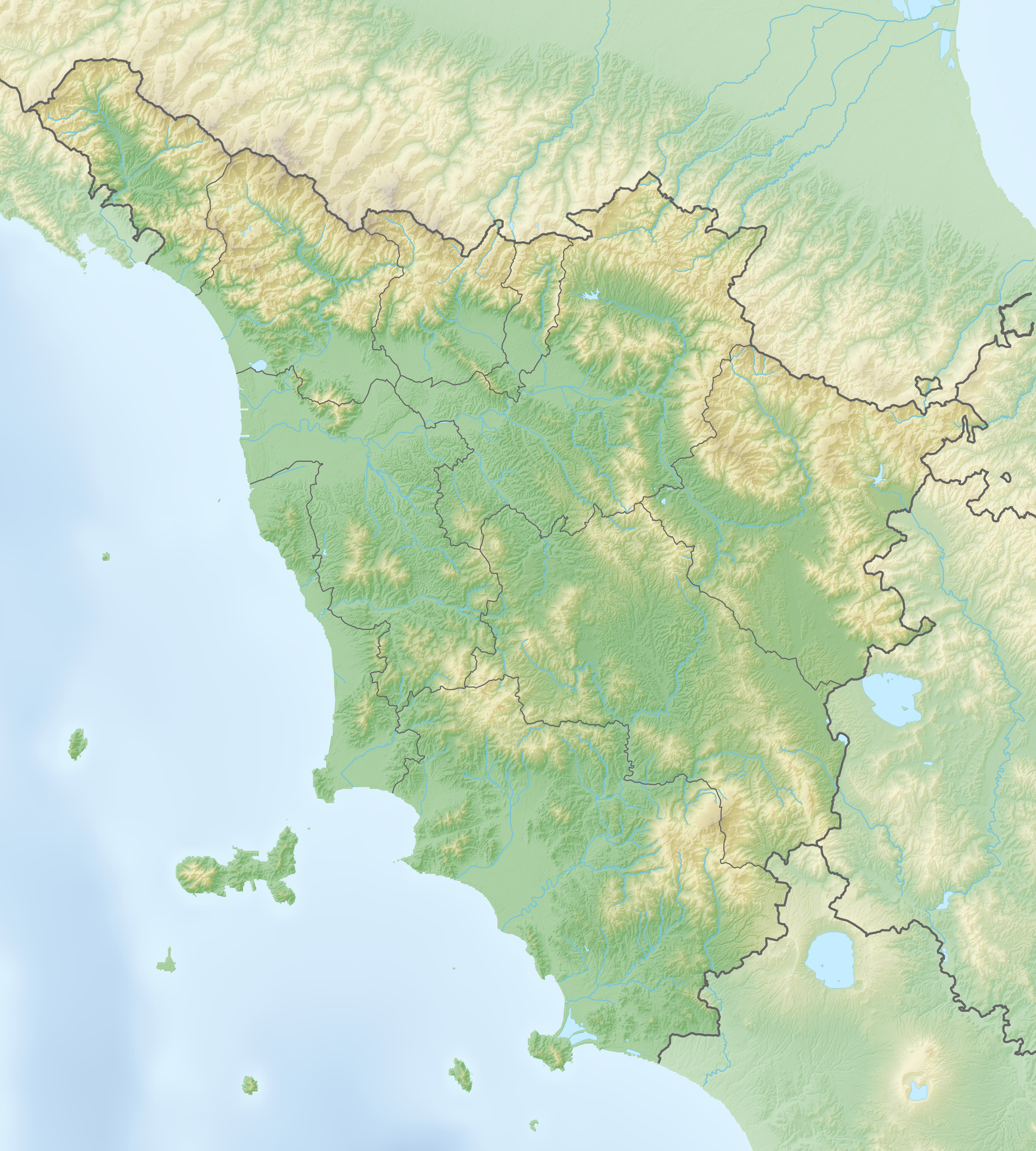
- Location within Tuscany
- Location: Province of Livorno, Tuscany
- Coordinates: 42°44′15.00″N 10°25′33.00″E
- Basin countries: Italy

Laghetto di Sassi Neri (Sassi Neri – black rock) is a small lake situated in the south-east of the island of Elba in the Province of Livorno, Tuscany, Italy, originating from the flooding of a Magnetite mine shaft abandoned in the 1980s.
