= Compagnia Toscana Trasporti Nord =

Defunct Italian transport company

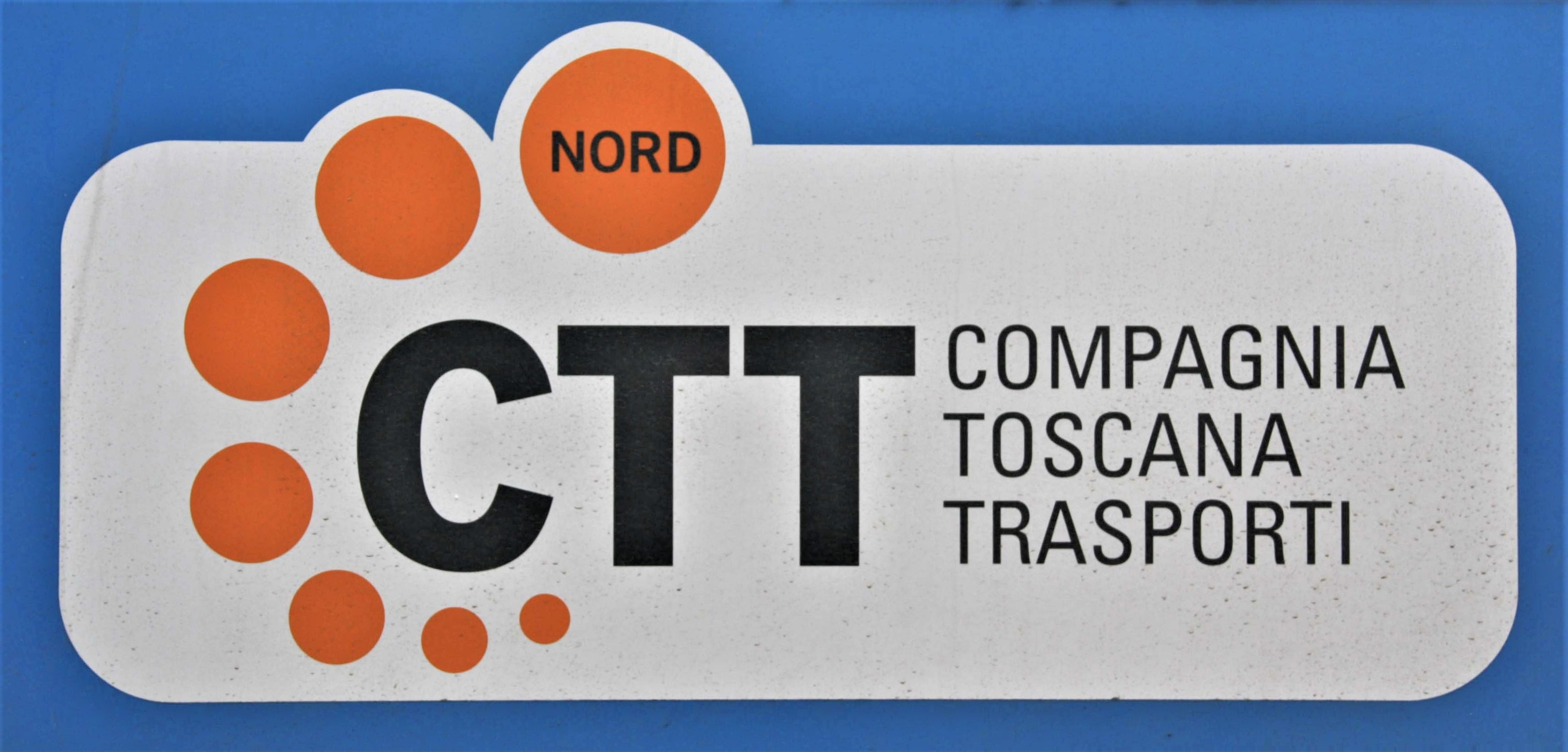
- Founded: 22 October 2012
- Ceased operation: 1 November 2021
- Headquarters: Pisa (Corporate); Livorno (Production); Prato (Commercial)
- Service area: Province of Livorno; Province of Pisa; Province of Lucca; Province of Massa Carrara
- Service type: Public transportation
- Website: www.cttnord.it

Compagnia Toscana Trasporti Nord, also known as CTT Nord, was a public transport company established on 22 October 2012, with corporate office in Pisa and operational offices in Livorno, Prato, Lucca and Massa Carrara. It was formed after a long process of aggregation, more than ten years, of the several local public transport companies; it became the largest regional public transport company in terms of size and diffusion in the Region extending its activity through the provinces of Livorno, Pisa, Lucca and Massa-Carrara.

== History ==
Compagnia Toscana Trasporti (CTT) was formed in 2006, with equal capital between public companies as Consorzio Lucchese Autotrasporti Pubblici (CLAP), Consorzio Pistoiese Trasporti (COPIT), Consorzio Pisano Trasporti (CPT), Azienda Trasporti Livornese (ATL) and private shareholders as Cooperativa Autotrasporti Pratesi (CAP Autolinee) and Lazzi. CTT concentrated in its hands the administrative, the informatics and the commercial services on behalf of the investors. This experience became preparatory to the merger, that took place in September 2012, when was merged into the new Compagnia Toscana Trasporti Nord (CTT Nord).

CTT Nord was owned by sixty-three Comuni and public transport companies as Azienda Trasporti Livornese (ATL), which was incorporated, Cooperativa Autotrasporti Pratesi (CAP Autolinee), Lucca Holding (Comune di Lucca), Società Generale Trasporti e Mobilità (SGTM), and subsidiary companies such as Autolinee Toscana Nord (ATN), BluBus, Consorzio Pisano Trasporti (CPT), Consorzio Pistoiese Trasporti (COPIT), La Ferrovia Italiana, Mobit, ONE Scarl, Power Energia, Ti Forma, VaiBus.

CTT Nord operated directly the local public transport in the cities of Livorno, Cecina, Rosignano Marittimo, Portoferraio and the suburban transport in the Province of Livorno including Elba, with the exception of the southern part of the island operated by Tiemme Toscana Mobilità and, since 1 February 2015, the province of Massa-Carrara where Autolinee Toscana Nord (ATN) were taken over.

Through its subsidiaries as Consorzio Pisano Trasporti (CPT) and VaiBus run the local transport in the cities of Pisa, Pontedera, Volterra, Lucca, Viareggio and the suburban transport in almost all the provinces of Pisa and Lucca; Consorzio Autolinee Pratesi (CAP Autolinee) operated in the provinces of Prato and partly in that of Florence.

== Innovation ==
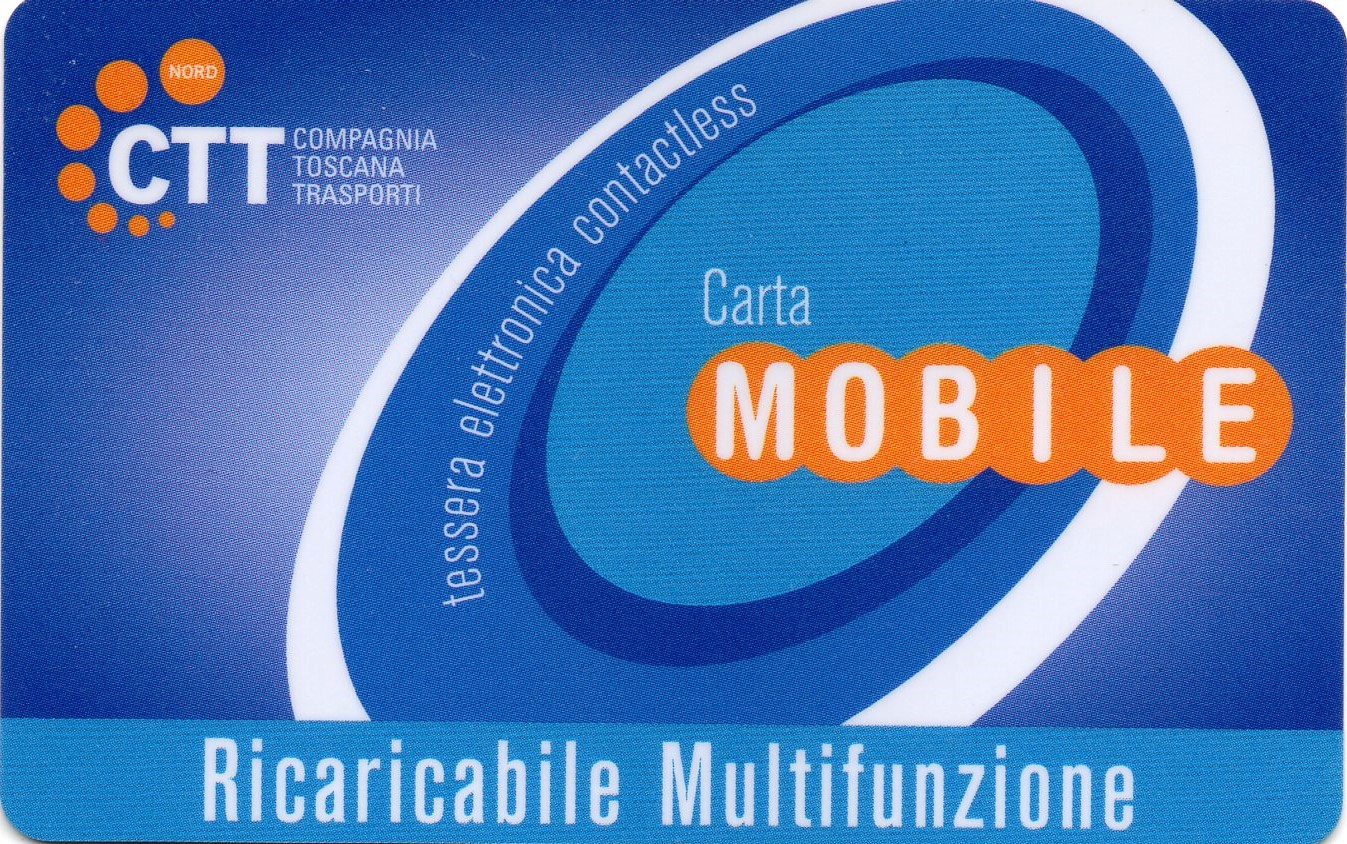
Contactless rechargeable multifunction card

CTT Nord invested on the AVM technology tracking all vehicles by satellite to give real time information to the passengers through smart bus stop, travel planner and introducing electronic payment for tickets through a rechargeable multifunction card (Carta Mobile).

CTT Nord carried out 28,669,824 Km travelled, 1,132,621 hours of service, employed 1408 workers and about 800 buses as of 31 December 2020.

== Routes ==
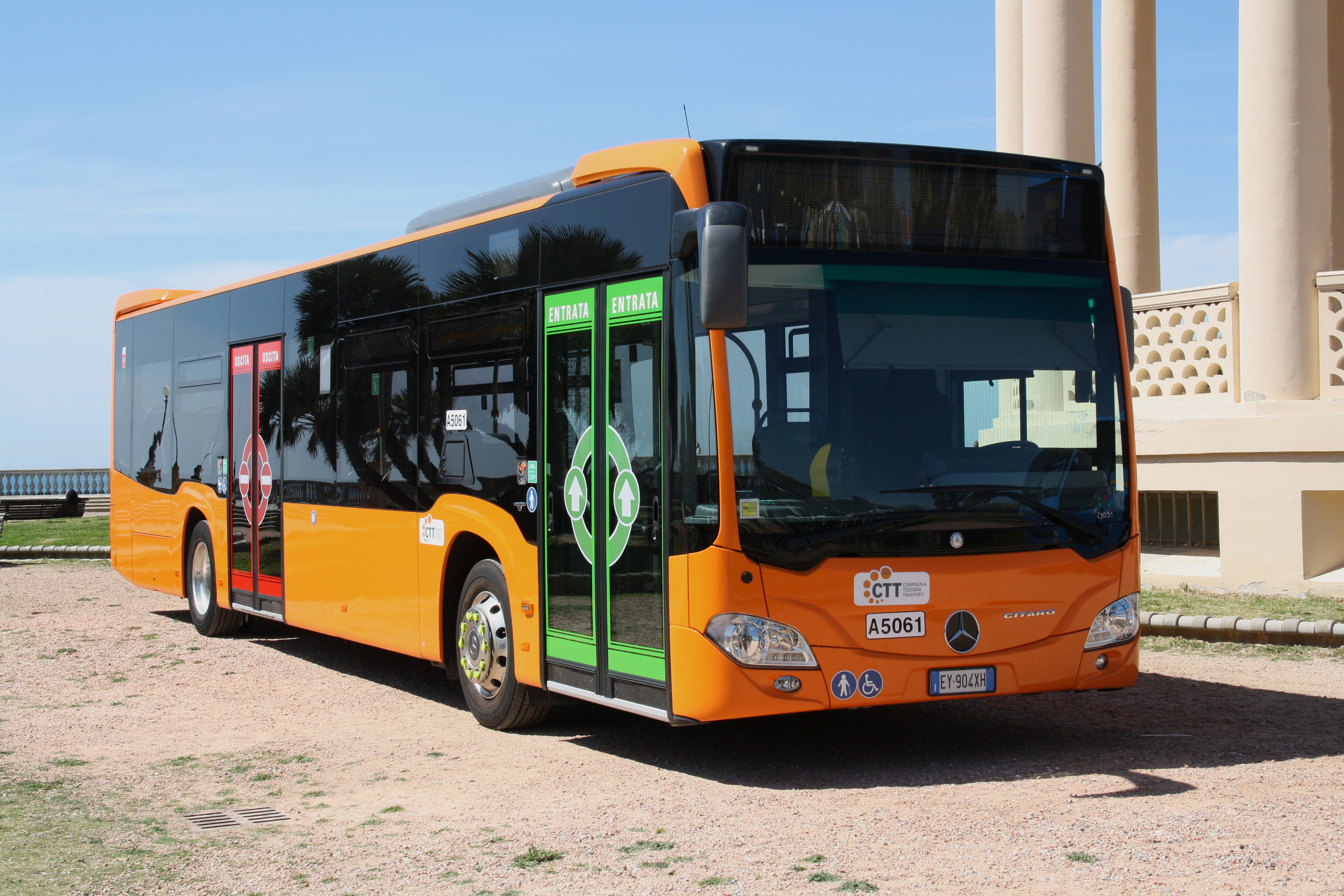
CTT Nord Mercedes-Benz Citaro

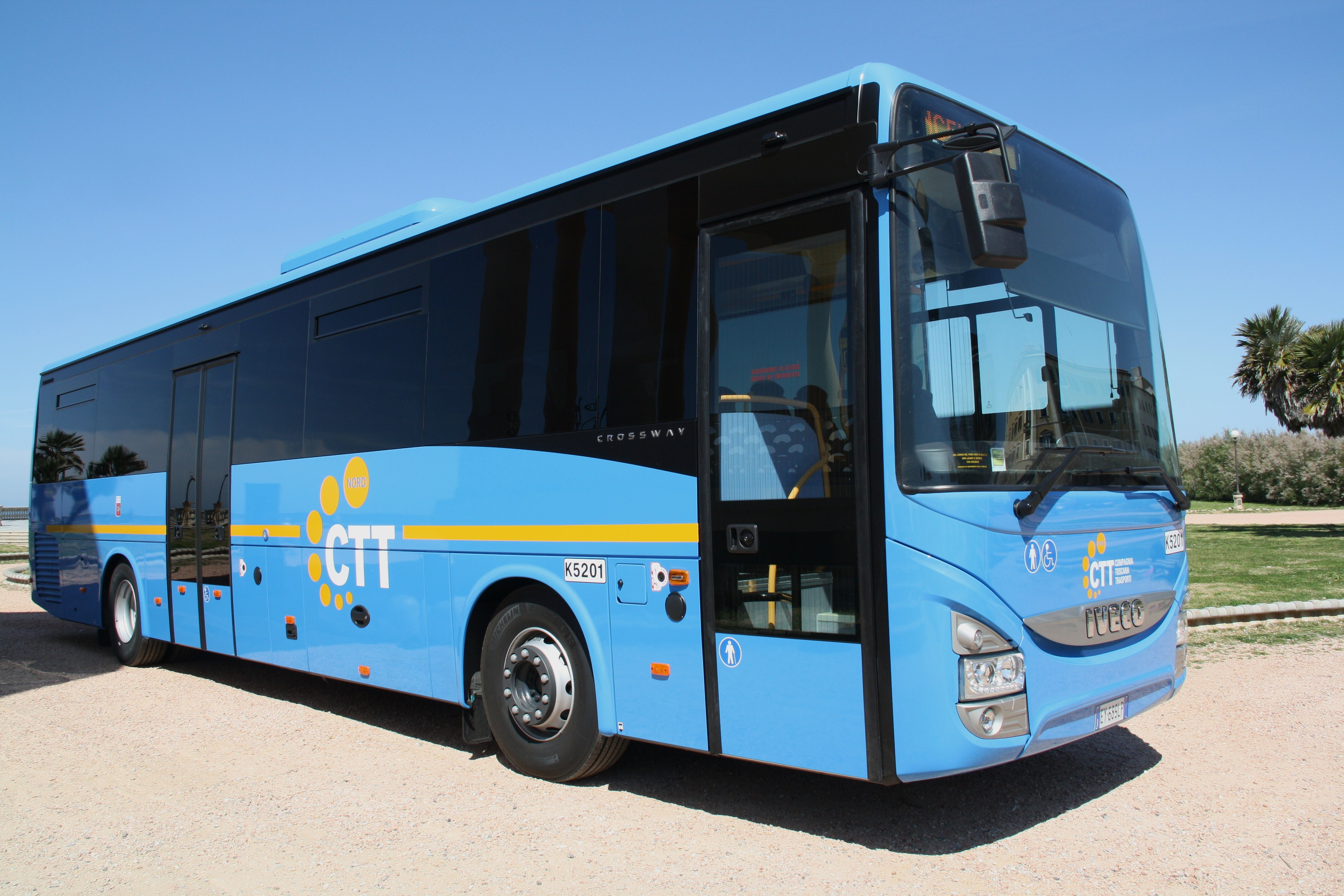
CTT Nord Iveco Crossway

Number of routes
Cities	Urban Routes	Suburban Routes	School service	Notes
Carrara	14	8		
Cecina	3	5	7	
Empoli	5	14		
Livorno	18	6	1	
Lucca	13	82	6	
Lunigiana		40		
Massa	9	7	5	
Pisa	16	60	1	
Pontedera	4			
Portoferraio	6	3		
Prato	9	11	26	
Rosignano Marittimo	8		4	
Viareggio	4			
Volterra	2			

== Fleet ==
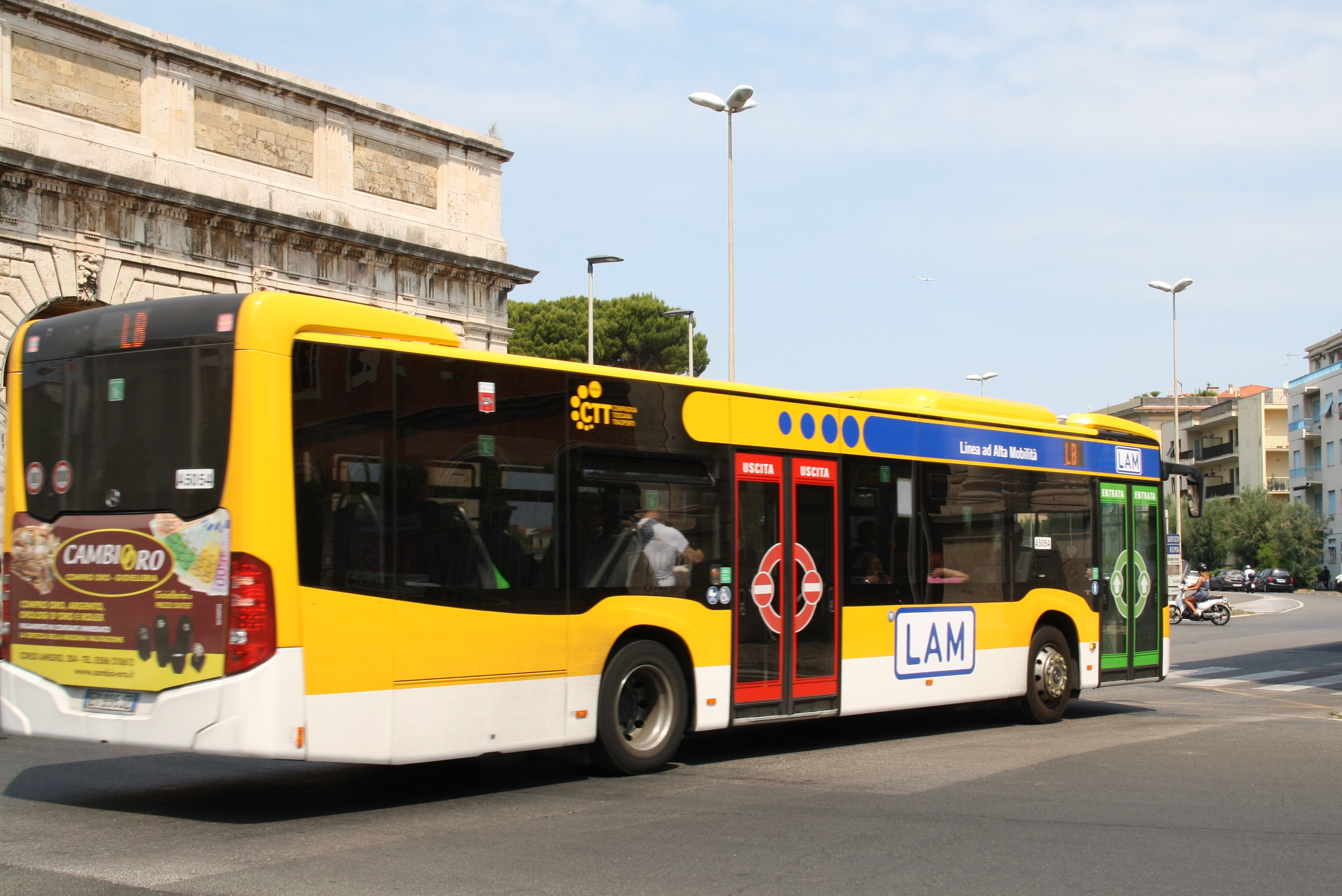
CTT Nord Mercedes Benz Citaro in Livorno Blue LAM livery

CTT Nord began to renew the bus fleet, both urban and suburban, choosing models suitable for the assorted routes of the territory with regard to the hilly one or to the small medieval towns with narrow streets. The majority of the urban models purchased were the Mercedes-Benz Citaro, while for the suburban vehicle were acquired Iveco Crossway, Setra S412 and Setra S415. Four Rampini Alè buses were purchased for the urban service of Lucca as the model was already in use, and five suburban Belaus Gianino operated in Massa-Carrara. CTT Nord, in nine years of activity, renewed partially the fleet decreasing the average age of the buses purchasing 220 new vehicles.

== Public tender ==
The Regione Toscana projected in 2010 the reform of the local public transport by road, to guarantee economic and social sustainability to the sector for the coming eleven years, with a public tender, to appoint a sole agent to manage the local public transport in Tuscany. The Region and ONE Scarl, the consortium born on 21 December 2017 formed by twelve public transport operators (ATAF&Li-nea, Autolinee Chianti Valdarno, Autolinee Mugello Valdisieve, BluBus, CAP Autolinee, Consorzio Pisano Trasporti, CTT Nord, Etruria Mobilità, PiùBus, Siena Mobilità, Tiemme Toscana Mobilità, Vaibus), signed an agreement on 29 December 2017 to fulfil the transitional period pending the opinion of the European Court of Justice and the Council of State for the assignment of the public transport services to a single company occurred with a public tender. Following several appeals, the takeover of local operators has been postponed various times until 1 November 2021 when Autolinee Toscane became the single operator in the Region.

== See also ==
- Bus
- Public transport
