= Parrana San Giusto =

- Frazione
- Location of Parrana San Giusto in Italy
- Coordinates: 43°31′28″N 10°26′51″E
- Country: Italy
- Region: Tuscany
- Province: Livorno (LI)
- Comune: Collesalvetti
- Elevation: 144 m (472 ft)

Population (2011)
  - Total: 76
- Time zone: UTC+1 (CET)
  - Summer (DST): UTC+2 (CEST)
- Postal code: 57017
- Dialing code: (+39) 0565

Parrana San Giusto is a village in Tuscany, central Italy, administratively a frazione of the comune of Collesalvetti, province of Livorno. At the time of the 2011 census its population was 76.

The village is about 18 km from Livorno and 9 km from Collesalvetti.

== Bibliography ==
- Emanuele Repetti (1841). "Parrana Vecchia e Nuova". Dizionario Geografico Fisico Storico della Toscana. Florence.
