= Tora (river) =

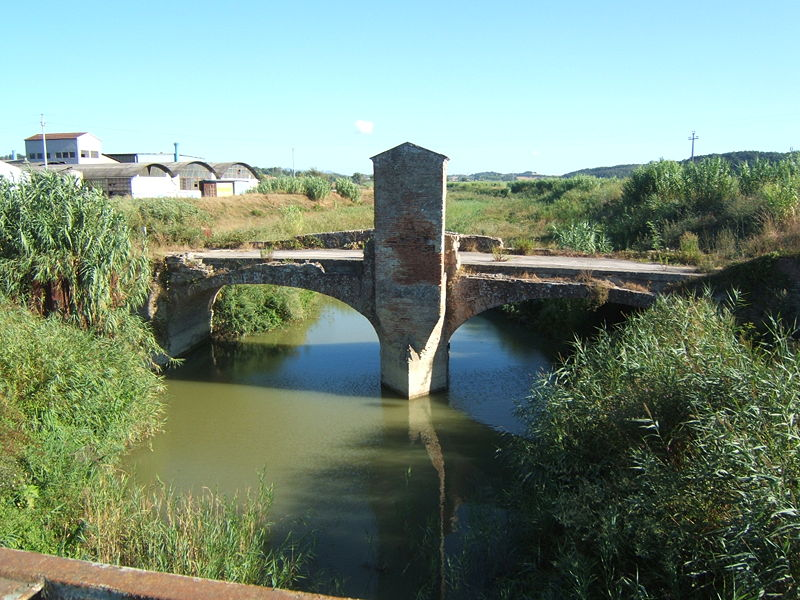
- Ponte Mediceo in Collesalvetti

Location
- Country: Italy

Physical characteristics
- Mouth: Scolmatore dell'Arno
  - coordinates: 43.6125°N 10.4071°E

Basin features
- Progression: Scolmatore dell'Arno→ Tyrrhenian Sea

The Tora is a stream in the province of Livorno, Tuscany, central Italy. It is a stretch of water from below Pisan Hills, south of the Arno Valley.

With its 29 kilometres it is the longest river that receives most of its tributaries from Livorno Hills. It leads into Scolmatore dell'Arno near Mortaiolo.
