= Guasticce =

- Frazione
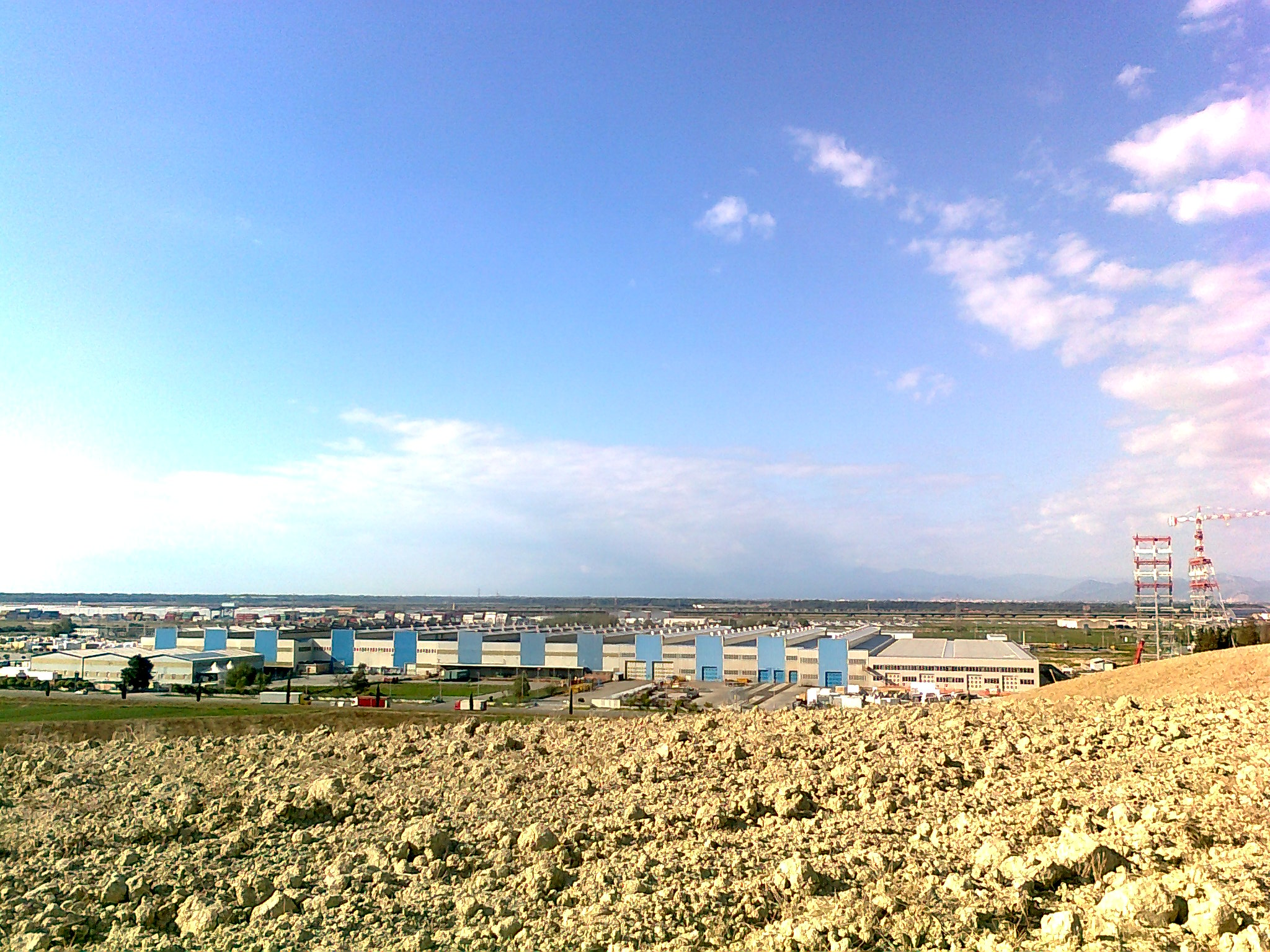

- Location of Guasticce in Italy
- Coordinates: 43°35′58″N 10°24′20″E
- Country: Italy
- Region: Tuscany
- Province: Livorno (LI)
- Comune: Collesalvetti
- Elevation: 4 m (13 ft)

Population (2011)
  - Total: 1,320
- Time zone: UTC+1 (CET)
  - Summer (DST): UTC+2 (CEST)
- Postal code: 57017
- Dialing code: (+39) 0565

Guasticce is a town in Tuscany, central Italy, administratively a frazione of the comune of Collesalvetti, province of Livorno. At the time of the 2011 census its population was 1,320.

The town is about 11 km from Livorno and 6 km from Collesalvetti.

== Bibliography ==
- Emanuele Repetti (1839). "Guasticce". Dizionario Geografico Fisico Storico della Toscana. Florence.
