= Nugola =

- Frazione
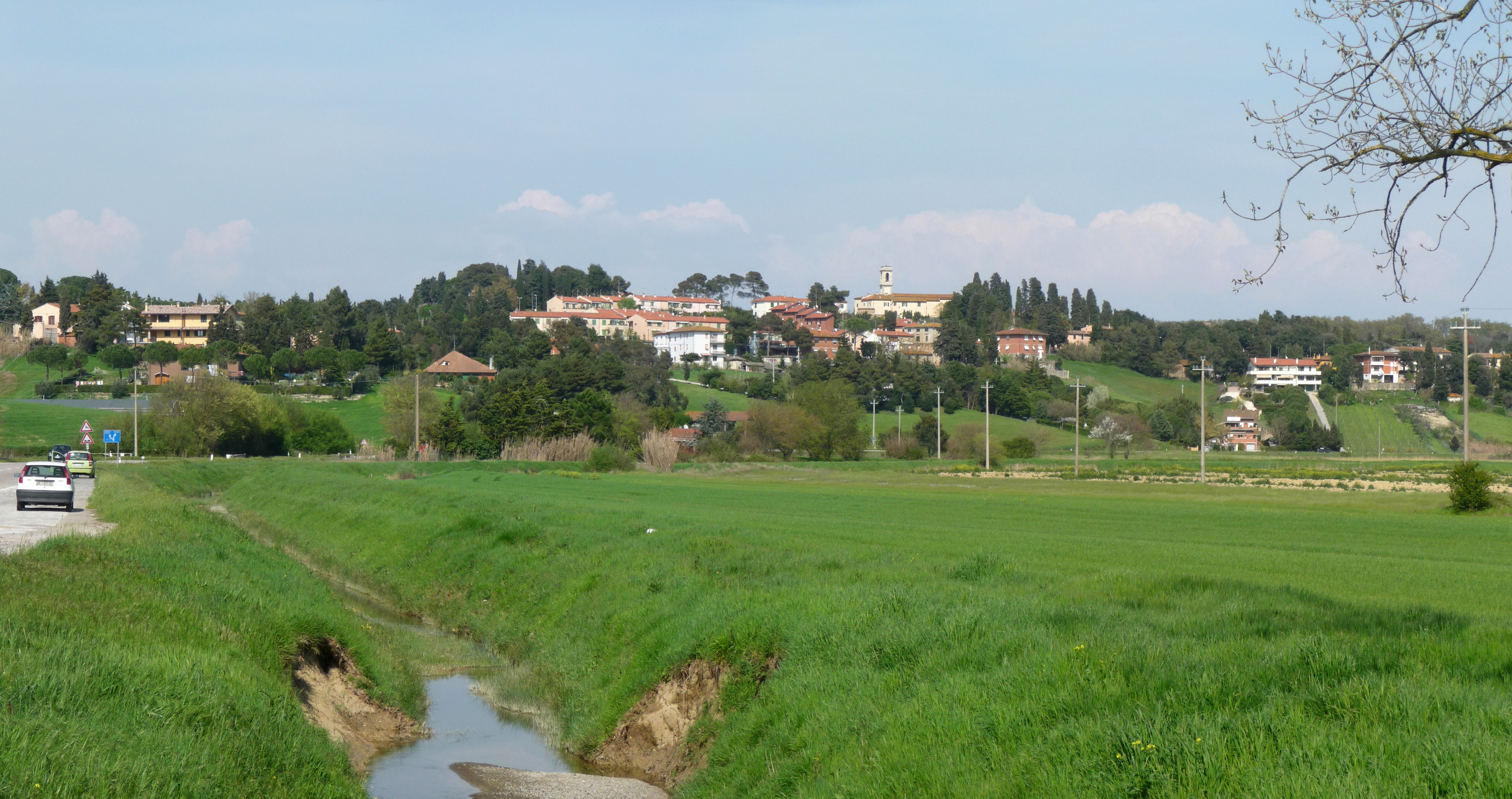
- View of Nugola

- Location of Nugola in Italy
- Coordinates: 43°34′36″N 10°26′24″E
- Country: Italy
- Region: Tuscany
- Province: Livorno (LI)
- Comune: Collesalvetti
- Elevation: 69 m (226 ft)

Population (2011)
  - Total: 874
- Time zone: UTC+1 (CET)
  - Summer (DST): UTC+2 (CEST)
- Postal code: 57017
- Dialing code: (+39) 0565

Nugola is a town in Tuscany, central Italy, administratively a frazione of the comune of Collesalvetti, province of Livorno. At the time of the 2011 census its population was 874.

Nugola is about 14 km from Livorno and 6 km from Collesalvetti.

== Bibliography ==
- Emanuele Repetti (1841). "Nugola". Dizionario Geografico Fisico Storico della Toscana. Florence.
