= Autolinee Toscane =

Italian enterprise owned by RATP Dev

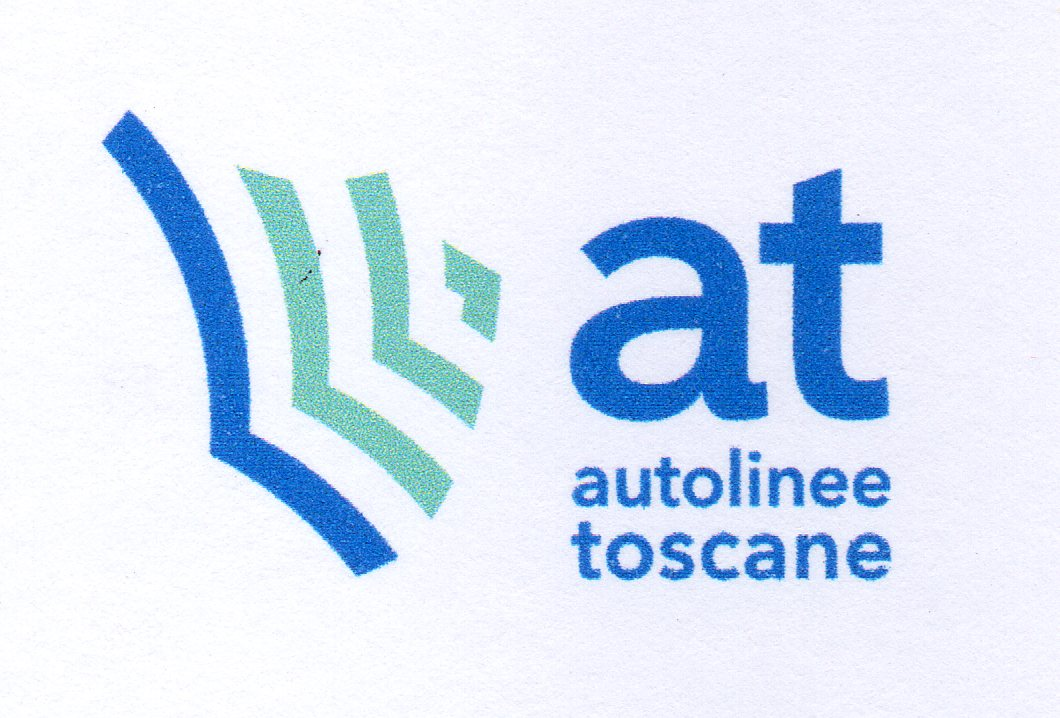
- Parent: RATP Dev
- Founded: 9 October 1996
- Headquarters: Borgo San Lorenzo
- Service area: Regione Toscana
- Service type: Public transportation
- Chief executive: Gianni Bechelli
- Operational Manager: Jean-Luc Laugaa
- Website: www.at-bus.it/en

Autolinee Toscane S.p.A. (also known as at) is a private Italian-French company, wholly owned by RATP Dev, active in the local public transport sector. It manages several urban and suburban bus lines in Tuscany for a total of 1.7 million kilometres travelled annually.

It is part of a temporary association of companies ColBus together with MAS+, the latter owned by F.lli Alterini, S.A.M. and F.lli Magherini, and holds 33% of the company Li-nea, also owned by ATAF Gestioni and Cooperativa Autotrasporti Pratesi.

== Public tender ==
The Regione Toscana projected in 2010 the reform of the local public transport by road, to guarantee economic and social sustainability to the sector for the coming eleven years, with a public tender, to appoint a sole agent to manage the local public transport in Tuscany. The Region and ONE Scarl, the consortium born on 21 December 2017 formed by twelve public transport operators (ATAF&Li-nea, Autolinee Chianti Valdarno, Autolinee Mugello Valdisieve, BluBus, CAP Autolinee, Consorzio Pisano Trasporti, CTT Nord, Etruria Mobilità, PiùBus, Siena Mobilità, Tiemme Toscana Mobilità, Vaibus), signed an agreement on 29 December 2017 to fulfil the transitional period pending the opinion of the European Court of Justice and the Council of State for the assignment of the public transport services to a single company occurred with a public tender. Following several appeals, the takeover of local operators has been postponed various times until 1 November 2021 when Autolinee Toscane became the single operator in the Region.

== Assets ==
Autolinee Toscane operate the following transporting assets as of 1 November 2021:

- 4,827 employees
- 1,051 local buses
- 153 suburban buses
- 1,521 regional buses
- 37,538 bus stop
- 35 ticket offices
- 3,000 ticket dealers
- 440 local bus routes
- 57 depots
- 565 suburban bus routes toward 307 comuni
- 24,527 km of lines
- 110,865,333 km to cover yearly
- 2 Funicular (Montenero funicular and Certaldo funicular)

== Routes ==
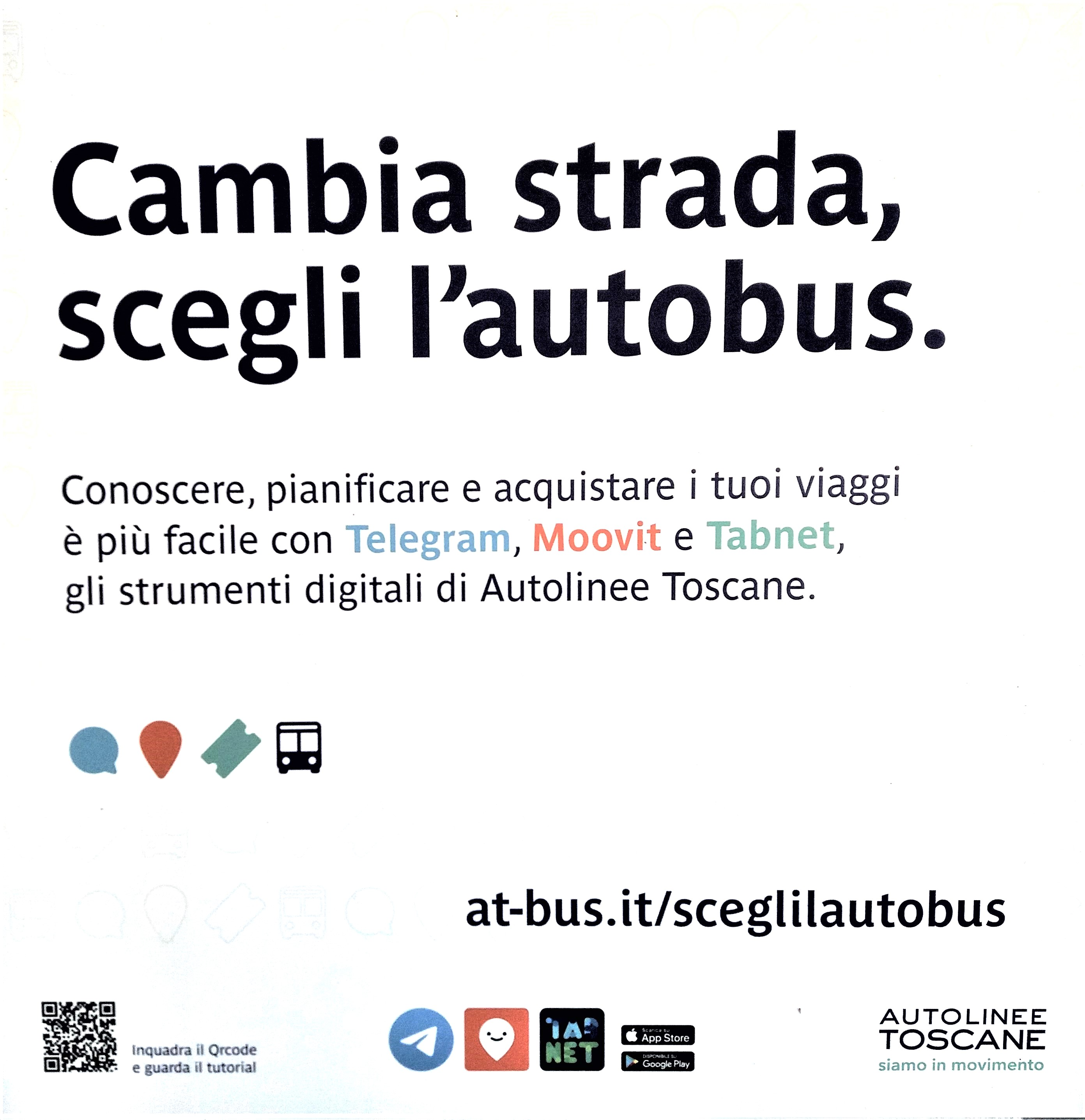
Advertising campaign “Change your way, take the bus”

Number of routes by Province
Provinces	Local Routes	Regional Routes
Arezzo	30	52
Firenze	90	98
Grosseto	22	2
Livorno	57	27
Lucca	18	85
Massa-Carrara	28	48
Pisa	34	49
Pistoia	34	28
Prato	9	10
Siena	118	67
Regional	-	9

== Vehicles ==
Autolinee Toscane fleet is really varied as it derives from the merger of twenty-two transport companies with different needs by territory and routes. AT is planning to renew the fleet acquiring 2,095 buses over a period of ten years.

As the average age of the vehicles is higher, about half has more than 15 years of activity, AT decided to purchase immediately new buses in 2022 making an investment of 40 million euros to buy 223 new local and regional buses. As of August 2022 has been purchased the following models.

=== New buses ===
Conecto

The Mercedes-Benz Conecto have been purchased and put into service in the main cities on those lines with significant flow of passengers. The new local model is 12 m (39.4 ft) long, equipped with Euro 6 engine and can carry 108 passengers (26 seated). The livery is completely white and the blue "at" logo is applied on the front, back and both sides of the bus.

Intouro

Four Mercedes-Benz Intouro 12 m (39.4 ft) long, with a capacity of 50 seats and 25 standing, entered in service on the regional fast routes connecting Florence with Siena, Montespertoli and Borgo San Lorenzo. The bus livery is completely blue and the white "at" logo is applied on the back, front and both sides.

Sprinter City

Six minibus Sprinter City, adapted by Indcar Mobi, were acquired in order to service the small cities or the hilly routes of the region.

Crafter

Three Volkswagen Crafter minibuses were delivered on 25 May 2022 to operate in the historic center of Montepulciano. The minibuses have a length of 7 m (23.0 ft), a width of 2 m (6.6 ft) and can carry 25 passengers. They are slightly smaller by the standards required for the category, just to be suitable to transit within the historic center of Montepulciano, with its narrow streets, particular slopes and access gates through medieval doors. The Crafters have been modified by Carind International of Campello sul Clitunno, a company specialized in changing transport vehicles according to the required needs.

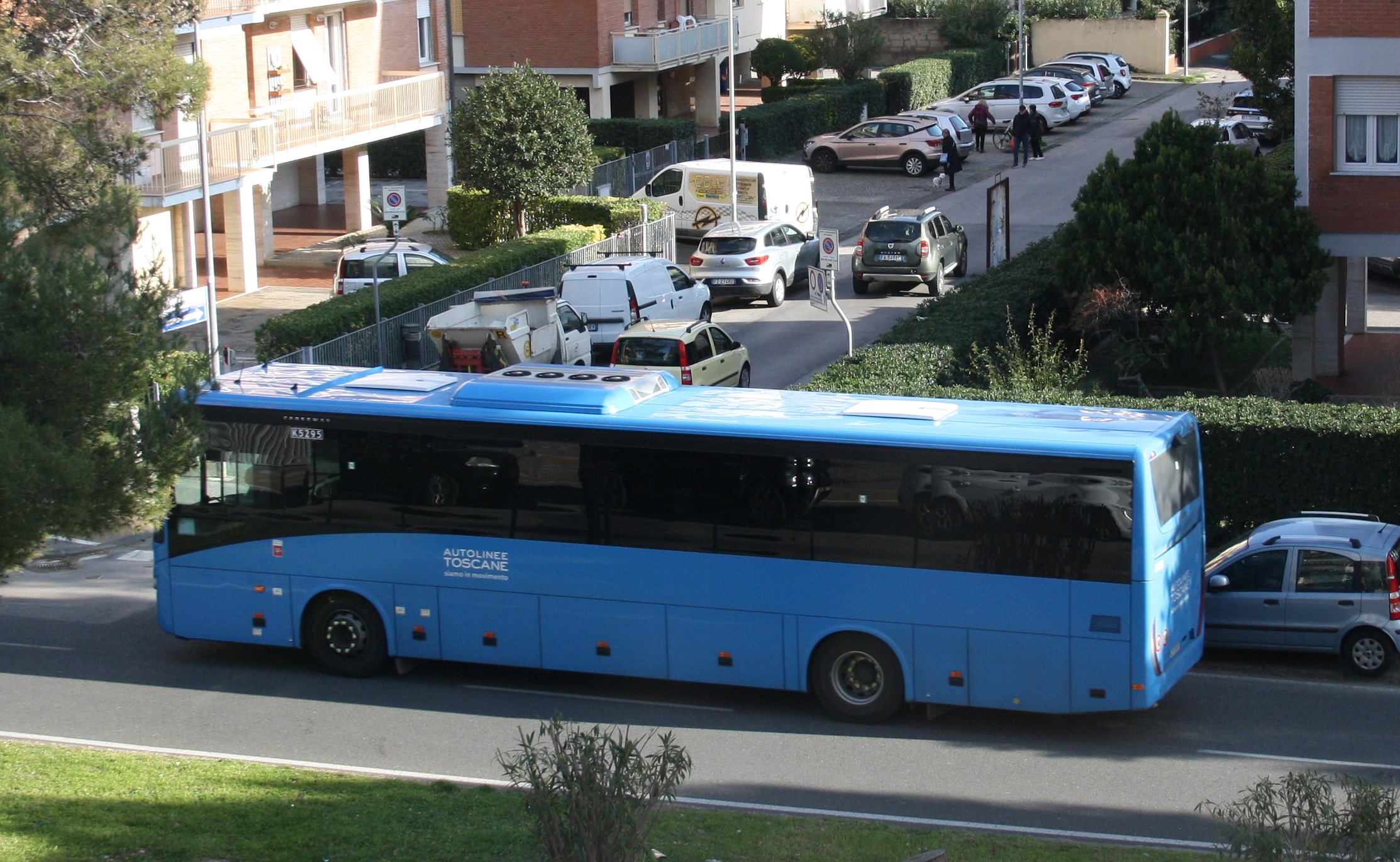
Autolinee Toscane Iveco Crossway

Crossway

The Iveco Crossway, in the 10 m (32.8 ft) and 12 m (39.4 ft) meters configuration and equipped with Euro 6 engines, have been acquired to increase and renew the obsolete former regional fleet operating through the Provinces of the Tuscany. The bus has a 49 passengers layout and appropriate space for one wheelchair and two folding seat.

- Iveco Crossway NF, powered by natural gas, entered in service in the provinces of Pistoia and Lucca on the regional lines. The buses are 12 m (39.4 ft) meters long and have a capacity of 53 seated, 19 standing and one wheelchair.
- Iveco Crossway LE CNG is the low-entry model City, equipped with Cursor 9 Natural Power, operating on the local and regional lines in the white livery. It has a length of 12 m (39.4 ft) and a capacity of 95 passengers (43 seated and 52 standing) plus one wheelchair.

Streetway

AT acquired the 18 metres (59.1 ft) meter-long Iveco Streetway with a capacity of 142 passengers (49 seated) fit for high density routes. The vehicle is equipped with Euro 6 step E engine with CNG fuelling.

E-Way

AT ordered 13 Iveco E-Way electric powered buses to be operated in Prato. Four vehicles have been delivered and operating, the remaining nine will be hand over by 2026. The E-Way is 10.7 metres (35.1 ft) meter-long and a capacity for 84 passengers (20 seated). The electric engine has a power of 294 kwh.

Daily 5

AT acquired Iveco Daily, modified by Indcar Mobi, 8.5 metres (27.9 ft) long suitable to be operated on the hilly routes of the Garfagnana and that in the provinces of Prato, Pistoia, Siena, Grosseto, Firenze and Pisa. Five 8 metres (26.2 ft) buses were acquired to be operated in the narrow streets of city centre of Lucca. All the buses are equipped with Euro 6 engines.

Kent

AT launched a tender for acquiring 250 new buses in three years time and Otokar resulted the winner of the purchase tender. The first batch provides for the delivery of 150 Kent buses 10.8 metres (35.4 ft) long equipped with 6.7L ISB Cummins Euro 6 engine and a capacity of 94 passengers.

Vectio

The second batch regards the delivery of 100 Vectio buses 9.26 metres (30.4 ft) long equipped with 6.7L ISB Cummins Euro 6 engine and a capacity of 59 passengers.

Eltron

Two electric buses Eltron M3, manufactured by Rampini SpA, were acquired for the local transport in Arezzo. The Eltron is 8 metres (26.2 ft) long and has a capacity of 45 passemgers, the electric engine has 281 kW power allowing an autonomy of 250 km; the batteries are recharged overnight.

Novociti Life

One single Anadolu Isuzu Novociti Life was acquired to operate regional routes departing from Siena. The model is 8.5 metres (27.9 ft) meter-long and a capacity of 60 passengers (21 seated) and one wheelchair. The bus is powered by an Euro 6 FPT NEF4 diesel engine.

== Fares ==
The fares are distinguished by a system of colours according to the routes reported at the bus stop:

- jade indicate local fare
- orange indicate mixed fare (local and regional)
- blue indicate regional fare
- violet indicate express regional fare
- green indicate free fare
- red indicate special fare

Local Tickets

Autolinee Toscane has adopted two single local fares in the entire Region: Urbano Capoluogo issued in the Capital of Provinces and Urbano Maggiore in the others main centres both for a 70 minutes (90 in Florence) validness. A multi-trip tickets carnet with ten tickets is on sale.

Passes

Various unlimited passes are available as needed, after an online registration, according to the type and the period (monthly, quarterly or annual). No card is released and the control is carried out exhibiting the Tessera sanitaria.

Elba Pass

Autolinee Toscane has released the Elba Pass that allows to discover the Elba travelling on the public transports. The card has a validity for one, three or six days and permit to go around unlimited on all buses.

== Innovation ==
Autolinee Toscane has started the installation of 1,013 display at bus stops throughout the Region. The new smart bus stop, produced by the Swedish company Axentia, is the latest generation in the electronic displays that will ensure a gradual evolution of the technologies applied to the stops of the local public transport network. The bus stop displays has a compact design, don't require power cable or antenna and the maintenance is reduced to the replacement of the battery every five years. The project has been brought forward compared to the program and is carried out in parallel with the installation of the newest AVM systems on the entire fleet that will provide the information of the passages in real time.

App at bus

Autolinee Toscane has developed its own app called at bus to manage by smartphone the moving by public transport within the territory of Tuscany. The app allows to buy tickets and passes, to plan and facilitate the choice of the routes, the stops and to check the timetable.

Contactless payment

Contactless payment is available to purchase tickets aboard, without charge, using cards or smartphones which make part of American Express, Mastercard and Visa brands. On the local lines “tap” every time onboard, a green screen appear when is checked in. On the regional and fast lines must be “tap” before getting off too. The service is available on the whole network.

== See also ==
- List of bus operating companies
