= Vicarello, Collesalvetti =

Vicarello
- Frazione
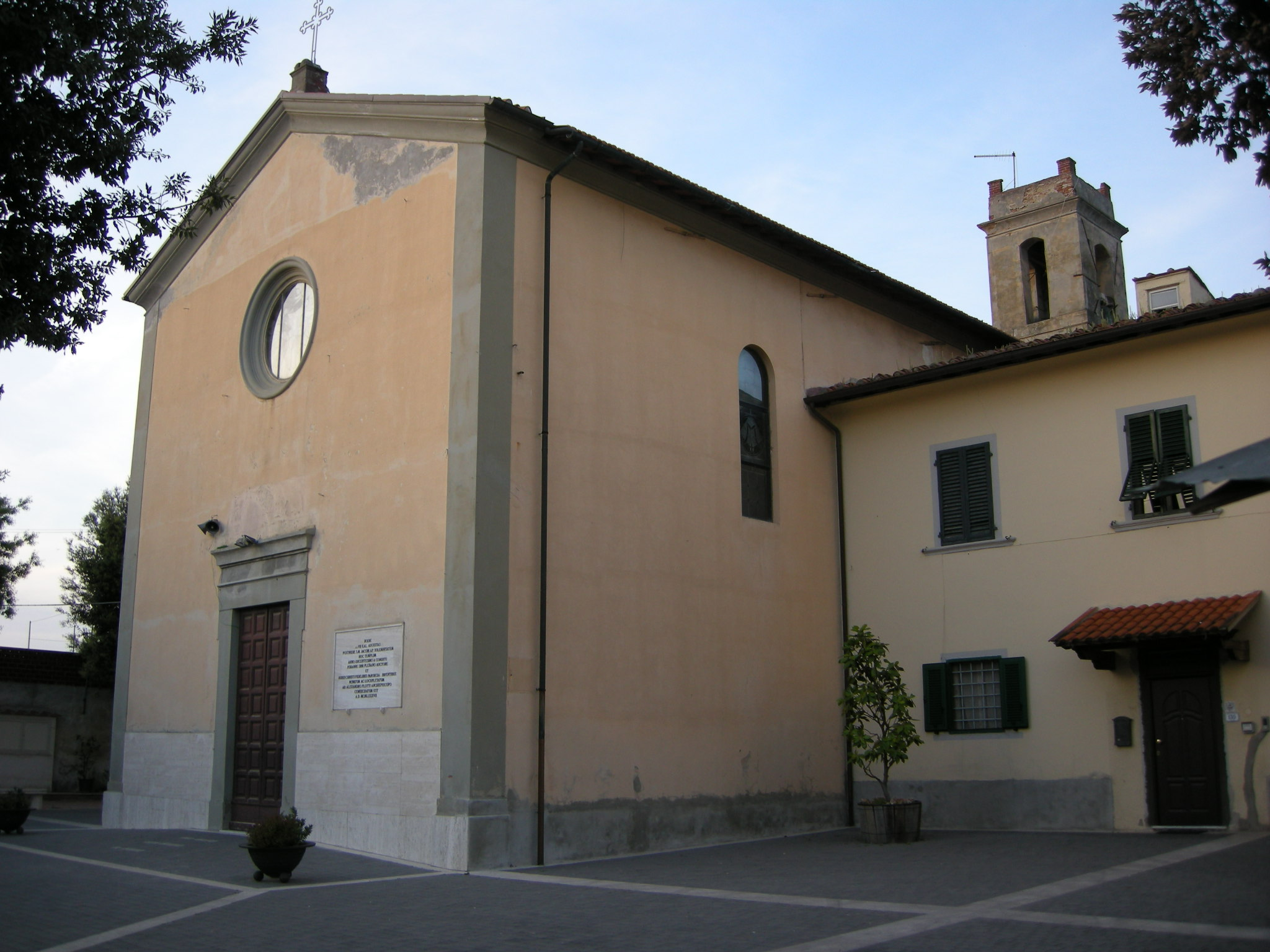
- The church of Sant'Jacopo

- Location of Vicarello in Italy
- Coordinates: 43°36′49″N 10°27′52″E
- Country: Italy
- Region: Tuscany
- Province: Livorno (LI)
- Comune: Collesalvetti
- Elevation: 9 m (30 ft)

Population (2011)
  - Total: 3,106
- Time zone: UTC+1 (CET)
  - Summer (DST): UTC+2 (CEST)
- Postal code: 57017
- Dialing code: (+39) 0565

Vicarello is a town in Tuscany, central Italy, administratively a frazione of the comune of Collesalvetti, province of Livorno. At the time of the 2011 census its population was 3,106.

The town is about 16 km from Livorno and 3 km from Collesalvetti.

== Bibliography ==
- Emanuele Repetti (1841). "Vicarello". Dizionario Geografico Fisico Storico della Toscana. Florence.
