= Colognole, Collesalvetti =

Colognole
- Frazione
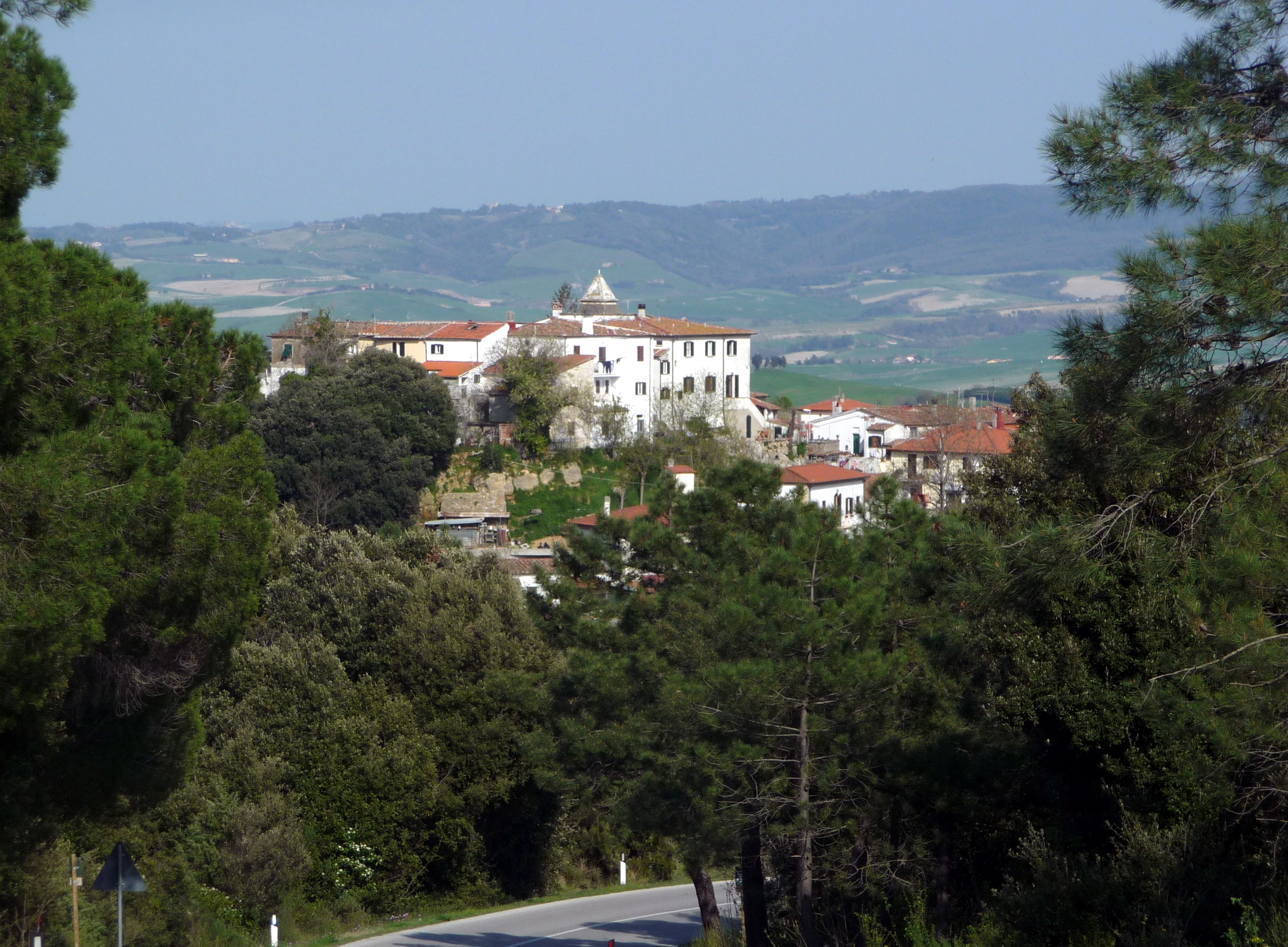

- Location of Colognole in Italy
- Coordinates: 43°30′34″N 10°26′53″E
- Country: Italy
- Region: Tuscany
- Province: Livorno (LI)
- Comune: Collesalvetti
- Elevation: 210 m (690 ft)

Population (2011)
  - Total: 154
- Time zone: UTC+1 (CET)
  - Summer (DST): UTC+2 (CEST)
- Postal code: 57017
- Dialing code: (+39) 0565

Colognole is a village in Tuscany, central Italy, administratively a frazione of the comune of Collesalvetti, province of Livorno. At the time of the 2011 census its population was 154.

Colognole is about 15 km from Livorno and 10 km from Collesalvetti.

== Bibliography ==
- Emanuele Repetti (1833). "Colognole". Dizionario Geografico Fisico Storico della Toscana. Florence.
