= Collesalvetti =

- Comune
- Comune di Collesalvetti
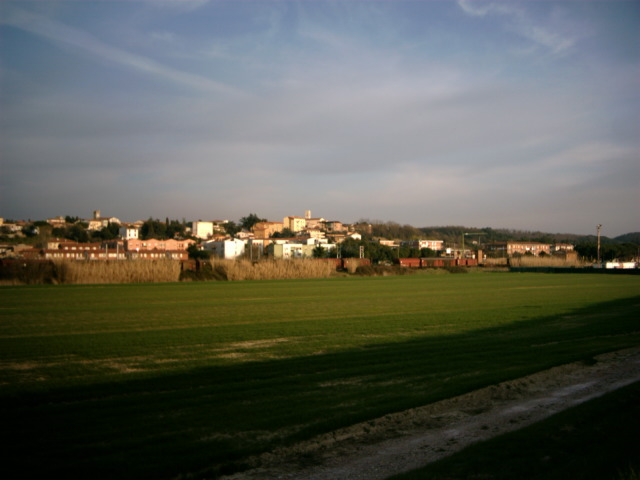
- Panorama of Collesalvetti

- Coat of arms

- Location within Italy Location within Tuscany
- Coordinates: 43°36′N 10°29′E
- Country: Italy
- Region: Tuscany
- Province: Livorno (LI)
- Frazioni: Castell'Anselmo, Colognole, Guasticce, Nugola, Parrana San Martino, Parrana San Giusto, Stagno, Vicarello

Government
  - Mayor: Sara Paoli (Democratic party)

Area
  - Total: 109.6 km^{2} (42.3 sq mi)
- Elevation: 40 m (130 ft)

Population (30 September)
  - Total: 16 396
  - Density: 0.15/km^{2} (0.38/sq mi)
- Demonym: Colligiani
- Time zone: UTC+1 (CET)
  - Summer (DST): UTC+2 (CEST)
- Postal code: 57014
- Dialing code: 0586
- ISTAT code: 049008
- Patron saint: Sts. Quriaqos and Julietta
- Saint day: June 16
- Website: Official website

Collesalvetti is a comune (municipality) in the Province of Livorno in the Italian region Tuscany, located about 70 kilometres (43 mi) southwest of Florence, 20 kilometres (12 mi) northeast of Livorno and only 16 kilometres (10 mi) south from Pisa.

The toponymy was first recorded in 1272 as Collis Salvecti (“hill of Salvetto”) in a land sale contract drawn up by “notary Salvetto, son of Borgo, in Villa di Colle,” owner of the hill.

== Geography ==
The territory is mainly flat and forms a triangle between the Lower Pisan Hills and the Livorno Hills. The northern part consists of a wide plain of alluvial origin (the soil is composed of clay deposits), crossed by the Fosso Reale canal, into which the Isola, Tora, and Tanna streams flow. The southern part, on the other hand, is mainly hilly, crossed longitudinally by the Tora stream, and is characterized by soil consisting of calcareous-siliceous clayey tuff. The physical appearance of the territory is very different from what it was in past centuries: the most obvious changes are the reclamation of marshy land and deforestation. The area south of Pisa, up to the area currently occupied by Livorno, was in fact almost exclusively marshy: this remains evident in the place names “Faldo,” “Stagno,” “Guasticce,” and others. During the Medici period, this large area was gradually reclaimed: in 1554, Cosimo I de' Medici ordered the construction of the Fosso Reale, with the function of collecting the turbid waters of the nearby streams and draining the marshy land; later, in 1672, it was re-excavated by order of Cosimo III by the Dutch engineer Van der Street and the mathematician Damiano Michelini. During the 18th century, the “colmate” system was successfully used to reclaim the remaining marshes.

Collesalvetti borders the following municipalities: Cascina, Crespina, Fauglia, Livorno, Orciano Pisano, Pisa, Rosignano Marittimo.

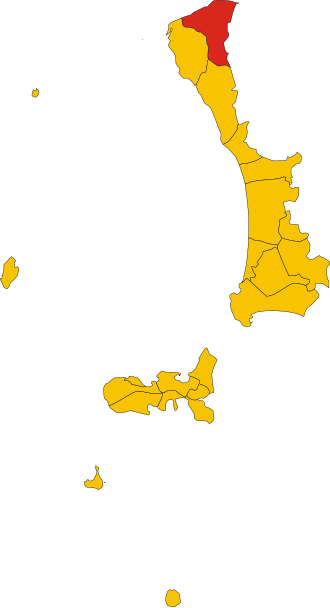
Location of the comune of Collesalvetti in the province of Livorno

== History ==
=== Etruscan-Roman Period ===
The earliest known settlements in Collesalvetti is from the Etruscan-Roman period. Although some excavations have found traces of human presence from the prehistoric times: in 1993, a Bronze Age pile-dwelling area was discovered in the Guasticce plain, while prehistoric and Hellenistic artifacts (4th century BC) were found in the vicinity of Stagno (Suese area). Traces of Roman presence are faint: the most obvious sign is the Via Æmilia Scauri, now completely covered by the SR 206 (still called Via Emilia today), along which several finds (cippus, stones) have been made. In particular, in 1989, a Roman post station was found near Torretta Vecchia. This post station, dating back to the 1st century BC, was a point of assistance and refreshment for travelers, and included a thermal bath. Other Roman artifacts have been found near Vicarello (stones from a bridge) and Mortaiolo.

=== Medieval Period ===
There are various documents relating to the medieval ages: the earliest written sources date back to the Carolingian era, which indicate that the territory of Collesalvetti was divided into seven curtes; at the end of the 10th century, the localities of Nugola, Castell'Anselmo, Parrana, and Colognole were elevated to castles, and there are records of numerous churches and some monasteries. Collesalvetti was simply called Il Colle (meaning "The Hill" in italian), perhaps because it was the first hill encountered coming from Pisa along the Via Emilia. Pisan rule began in 1109, during which time the castles fell into decline and the territory was divided into 13 municipalities: Montemassimo di sopra and di sotto, Nugola, Poggio Sigeri, Cordecimo, Santo Apostolo, Vicarello, Collesalvetti, Cugnano, le Parrane, Colognole, Farneta, and Postignano, all falling under the captaincy of Porto Pisano.

In Collesalvetti, there was also the castle of Colle Romuli, which no longer exists today. This fortress was owned by the Orlandi family, a consular family from Pisa, who exercised control over the territory.

The oldest document mentioning the town is a charter from 1178 containing a bull issued by Pope Alexander III confirming Ugone's ownership of the assets belonging to a parish that included the assets of “Civite in Colle” . In 1272, the name Collis Salvecti appeared, derived from the name of the owner, Salvetto, hence the name Collesalvetti. According to documents from the period, the ecclesiastical organization was entrusted to two parishes: Vicarello, with its church of San Jacopo and the chapel of Santi Quirico e Giulitta in Collesalvetti, and San Lorenzo in Piazza (now Torretta), which was very important and included all the churches in the rest of the territory, where an important agricultural fair was held.

In the 14th century, the region experienced significant depopulation due to the Bubonic plague and the wars of the following decades between Pisa and Florence, while only the hilltop settlements (Nugola, Castell'Anselmo, and Collesalvetti) survived and continued to develop; During this period, several towns and many pievi and castles disappeared, surviving only in historical records and leaving no trace in the present-day landscape, except in Badia and Castell’Anselmo. In 1406, Pisan rule came to an end following Florence’s victory over Pisa, and the territory of Collesalvetti was incorporated into the podesteria of Rosignano, under the Vicariate of Lari.

=== Medici-Lorraine Period ===
The Medici period in Collesalvetti was a time marked by the remarkable development of farms thanks to the land reclamation projects commissioned by the Medici. The Fosso Reale (now replaced by the Arno Floodway) was built in 1554 at the request of Cosimo I: it was a canal that collected the stagnant waters of various streams, which would otherwise have turned into marshes in the Sinus Pisanus, a vast marshland that covered the broad area between Pisa and the Livorno region.

In Collesalvetti there is a tower that, in 1497, had been recaptured by the Pisans during their rebellion (1494), during which Collesalvetti was set ablaze and sacked by the combined forces of the Pisans and Venetians, before returning to Florentine control. Also in Collesalvetti, the Medici purchased a large estate in 1476, which included a Medici villa—albeit a modest one—initially used by the family as a hunting lodge, but which later became a driving force behind the area’s agricultural development. However, the difficulty of regulating the waterways (Tora, Tanna, Isola) never allowed for lasting security for crops, preventing the full development of urban settlements, which, in fact, experienced periods of decline.

In 1737, the House of Lorraine succeeded the Medici as rulers of the Grand Duchy of Tuscany, continuing the land reclamation efforts. In 1769, Grand Duke Leopold himself visited the Collesalvetti area, and as he looked out over the plain toward Pisa, he observed a “vast countryside, almost uninhabited and uncultivated due to constant flooding”; Following this visit, substantial funds were invested in an intensive land reclamation program and in the construction of the road from Collesalvetti to Livorno. The results throughout the 18th century were evident, with the establishment of numerous farms and the introduction of new crops, followed by a significant increase in the population.

A major factor contributing to this increase was the land consolidation of the Collesalvetti farm, which was likely the most successful initiative within the overall plan to dispose of the grand ducal estate—a plan pursued with tenacity by Senator Francesco Maria Gianni in accordance with a policy supported by Grand Duke Pietro Leopoldo, who advocated dividing the Grand Duchy’s farms into multiple lots to be assigned to those who were working the land under a lease agreement, which required the payment of an initial fee and an annual rent (payable in two semiannual installments). This approach was strongly opposed by the Academy of Georgofili and by some senators, who favored selling the estates to the highest bidders.

During this period, Collesalvetti evolved from a farm into the administrative center of the vast surrounding territory, a process that began in the late 18th century with the privatization ordered by the Grand Duke and continued during the Napoleonic period (1808–1814). It was precisely during this period that the Municipality of Collesalvetti was established as a Mairie (1808–1810), corresponding largely to its current boundaries.

== Government ==
The comune is formed by the municipal seat of Collesalvetti and the frazioni – towns and villages – of Castell'Anselmo, Colognole, Guasticce, Nugola, Parrana San Martino, Parrana San Giusto, Stagno and Vicarello. The hamlet of Mortaiolo is also included in the municipality.

== Twin towns ==
Collesalvetti is twinned with:

- Garching an der Alz, Germany, since 2003
