= List of Fiat V.I. models from 1903 to 1974 =

List of Fiat V.I. models from 1903 to 1975, after 1975 see Iveco.

== Commercial and military vehicles ==
=== Old military & civilian Fiat trucks ===
- Fiat 24 HP (1903)
- Fiat 18/24 HP (1906)
- Fiat 28/40 HP (1907)
- Fiat Tipo 1 - 12/15 HP (1907)
- Fiat Tipo 2 (1911)
- Fiat 15 (1911)
- Fiat 16 (1911)
- Fiat 17 (1911)
- Fiat 18 (1911)
- Fiat 20 (1915)
- AMO F-15 (1924)

=== Civilian Fiat trucks ===
- Fiat 1F (1911)
- Fiat 2F (1914)
- Fiat 502F (1923)
- Fiat 505F (1923)
- Fiat 509F (1925)
- Fiat 603 (1925)
- Fiat 503F (1926)
- Fiat 605 (1926)
- Fiat 507F (1927)
- Fiat 621 (1929)
- Fiat 614 (1930)
- Fiat 632 (1931)
- Fiat 634 (1931)
- Fiat 618 (1934)
- Fiat 666 (1939)
- Fiat 626 (1939)
- Fiat 615 (1931)
- Fiat 633 N (1933)
- Fiat 634 N (1933)
- Fiat 621 N/PN (1934)
- Fiat 626 N (1939)
- Fiat 639 N (1950)
- Fiat 642 (1952)
- Fiat 682 (1952)
- Fiat C40 (1958)
- Fiat C50 (1959)
- Fiat 645 N (1959)
- Fiat 650 N (1960)
- Fiat 6602 (1960)
- Fiat 690 N (1960)
- Fiat 6605 TM69 (1962)
- Fiat 643 N (1963)
- Fiat 6640
- Fiat 616 N (1965)
- Fiat 625 N (1965)
- Fiat 693 N (1965)
- Fiat 619 N/T (1969)
- Fiat 673 N/T (1969)
- Fiat 684 N (1970)
- Fiat 697 N/T (1970)
- Fiat 40 NC (1972)
- Fiat 170/190 (1975)

=== Military Fiat trucks ===
- Fiat 18 BL (1914)
- Fiat 611C (1929)
- Fiat 634 N (1931)
- Fiat-SPA Dovunque 33 (1931)
- Fiat-SPA 36R (1933)
- Fiat 633NM (1933)
- Fiat 621PN (1934)
- Fiat-SPA Dovunque 35 (1935)
- Polski Fiat 621L (1935)
- Fiat 618MC (1935)
- Fiat-SPA 38R (1936)
- Fiat-SPA TL 37 (1937)
- Polski Fiat 618 (1937)
- Fiat 626 NM (1939)
- Fiat 626 BM (1941)
- Fiat 665 NM (1942)
- Fiat-SPA Dovunque 41 (1943)
- Fiat-SPA 10.000 (1945)
- Fiat 680 CP48 (1949)
- Fiat 639 CM (1950)
- Fiat 645 NM (1959)
- Fiat CP 62/70 (1962)
- Fiat 693 N1Z (1966)

== Public transport vehicles ==
=== Fiat buses ===
- Fiat 24HP (1903)
- Fiat 18/24 HP (1906)
- Fiat Tipo 2F (1911)
- Fiat 15 (1911)
- Fiat 18 (1911)
- AMO F-15 (1924)
- Fiat 603S (1925)
- Fiat 605 (1926)
- Fiat 635 R (1931)
- Fiat 632 RN (1933)
- Fiat 656 RN (1935)
- Fiat 666 RN (1935)
- Fiat 635 RN (1936)
- Fiat 626 NLR (1939)
- Fiat 642 (1950)
- Fiat 668 F (1950)
- Fiat 680 RN (1950)
- Fiat 401 (1953)
- Fiat 404 (1955)
- Fiat 411 (1955)
- Fiat 405 (1958)
- Fiat 306 (1956)
- Fiat 410 (1960)
- Fiat 414 (1960)
- Fiat 314 (1961)
- Fiat 412 (1961)
- Fiat 413 (1961)
- Fiat 409 (1963)
- Fiat 625 (1965)
- Fiat 320 (1967)
- Fiat 416 (1968)
- Fiat 343 (1970)
- Fiat 308 (1971)
- Fiat 418 (1971)
- Fiat 421 (1973)
- Fiat 420 (1975)
- Fiat-Iveco 370 (1976)
- Fiat-Iveco 315 (1978)
- Fiat-Iveco 470 (1979)
- Fiat-Iveco 570 (1979)
- Fiat-Iveco 670 (1979)
- Iveco EuroClass (1993)

=== Fiat trolleybuses ===
- Fiat 635 F (1932)
- Fiat 656 F (1936)
- Fiat 672 F (1940)
- Fiat 668 F (1950)
- Fiat 2401 Cansa (1953)
- Fiat 2405 (1955)
- Fiat 2411 (1955)
- Fiat 2472 Viberti (1958)
- Fiat 2470 (1979)
