= Emanuele Repetti =

Italian historian and naturalist

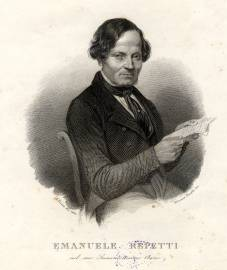
Emanuele Repetti

Emanuele Repetti (1776–1852) was an Italian historian and naturalist who wrote extensively on the history of Tuscany. He was born in Carrara.

== Works ==
He contributed to the Antologia of Vieusseux and the Atti of the Accademia dei Georgofili, of which he was secretary. From 1833 to 1846, he published the Dizionario geografico, fisico e storico della Toscana, which offers an account of the natural and civic history of municipalities in Tuscany. His work was primarily cultural, historical, linguistic and archaeological in nature.
