= Province of Livorno =

Province of Italy

Coordinates: 43°33′N 10°19′E

Province of Livorno Provincia di Livorno (Italian)
- Province
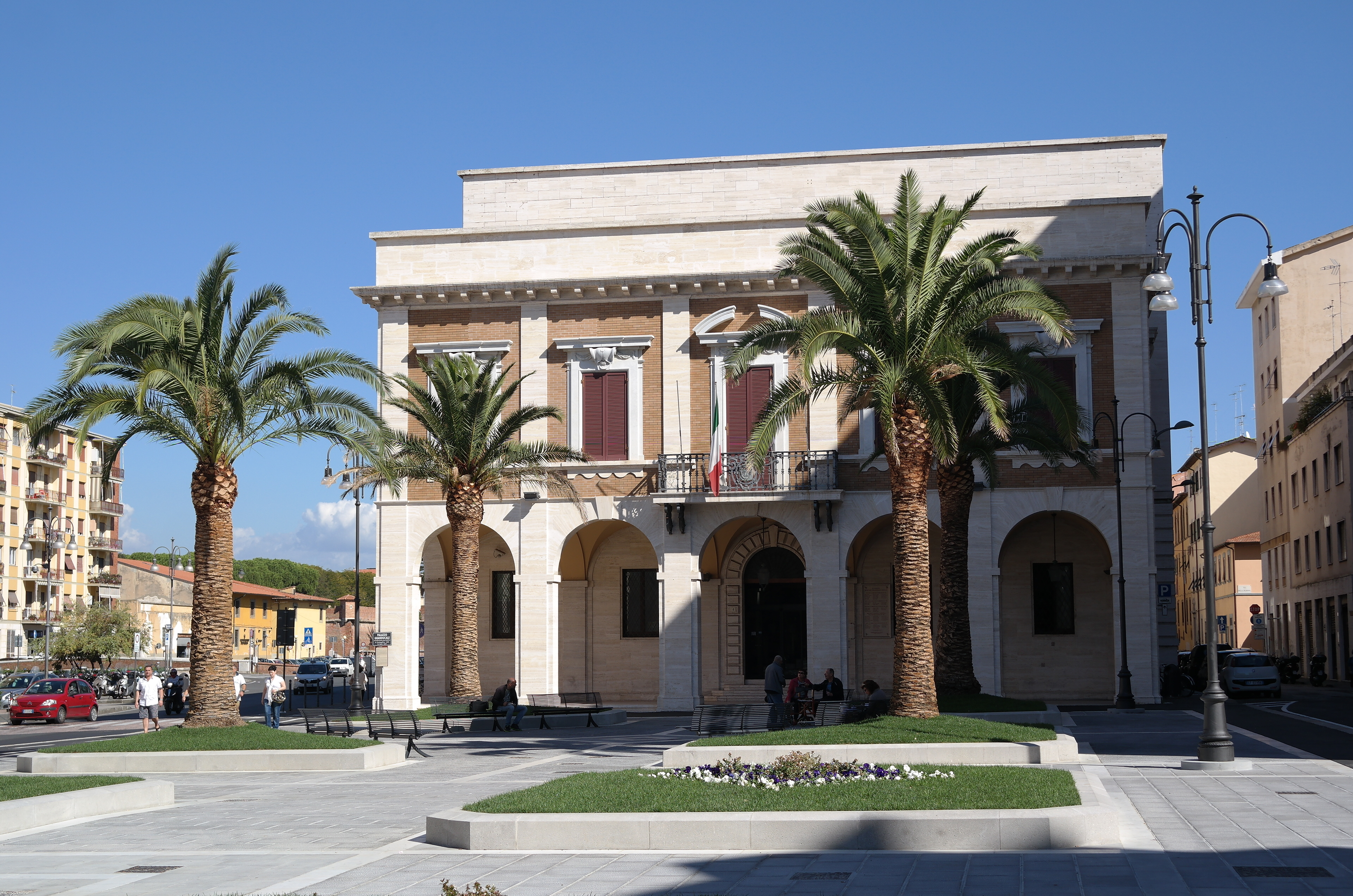
- Palazzo Granducale in Livorno, the provincial seat

- Flag Coat of arms

- Location of the province of Livorno in Italy
- Country: Italy
- Region: Tuscany
- Capital(s): Livorno
- Municipalities: 19

Government
  - President: Sandra Scarpellini (PD)

Area
  - Total: 1,213.71 km^{2} (468.62 sq mi)

Population (2026)
  - Total: 324,893
  - Density: 267.686/km^{2} (693.303/sq mi)

GDP
  - Total: €8.818 billion (2015)
  - Per capita: €26,049 (2015)
- Time zone: UTC+1 (CET)
  - Summer (DST): UTC+2 (CEST)
- Postal codes: 57014, 57016, 57020-57023, 57025, 57027-57028, 57030-57034, 57036-57039
- Telephone prefix: 0565, 0586
- ISO 3166 code: IT-LI
- Vehicle registration: LI
- ISTAT code: 049

The province of Livorno (Italian: provincia di Livorno) or, traditionally, province of Leghorn, is a province in the region of Tuscany in central Italy. It includes several islands of the Tuscan Archipelago, including Elba and Capraia. Its capital is the city of Livorno. When formed in 1861, the province included only Livorno and Elba Island. It was extended in 1925 with land from the provinces of Pisa and Genoa.

It has a population of 324,893 in an area of 1,213.71 square kilometres (468.62 sq mi) across its 19 municipalities.

The coastline of the area is known as "Costa degli Etruschi" (English: "Etruscan Coast"). The province of Livorno is coastal and contains a number of coastal towns. Livorno is a highly important port for tourism and trading, and a number of watchtowers are located nearby the city. At Calafuria, the sea contains sponges, shellfish, fish, and protected red coral (Corallium rubrum). The coastlines of Quercianella and Castiglioncello are rocky. The waters around the province of Livorno sometimes contain dolphins. The town Marina di Bibbona was founded as a fort due to its strategic coastal position. Town San Vincenzo contains a fourteenth-century tower for strategic reasons. The sand of Golfo di Baratti is silver and black due to its high iron concentration, and the area contains an archaeological park.

== Government ==
=== List of presidents ===
List of presidents of the province since 2014, the year of the Delrio reform.

President	Term start	Term end	Party
Alessandro Franchi	14 October 2014	30 October 2018	Democratic Party
Maria Ida Bessi	30 October 2018	26 November 2022	Independent (centre-left)
Sandra Scarpellini	26 November 2022	Incumbent	Democratic Party

=== Municipalities ===
The province has 19 municipalities:

- Bibbona
- Campiglia Marittima
- Campo nell'Elba
- Capoliveri
- Capraia Isola
- Castagneto Carducci
- Cecina
- Collesalvetti
- Livorno
- Marciana
- Marciana Marina
- Piombino
- Porto Azzurro
- Portoferraio
- Rio
- Rosignano Marittimo
- San Vincenzo
- Sassetta
- Suvereto

== Demographics ==
As of 2026, the population is 324,893, of which 48.6% are male, and 51.4% are female. Minors make up 12.9% of the population, and seniors make up 28.7%.

Historical population

Year	Pop.	±%
1861	151,409	—
1871	158,037	+4.4%
1881	164,557	+4.1%
1901	176,524	+7.3%
1911	203,972	+15.5%
1921	224,321	+10.0%
1931	241,483	+7.7%
1936	249,344	+3.3%

Year	Pop.	±%
1951	282,244	+13.2%
1961	310,048	+9.9%
1971	335,265	+8.1%
1981	346,657	+3.4%
1991	336,626	−2.9%
2001	326,444	−3.0%
2011	335,247	+2.7%
2021	327,262	−2.4%

Source: ISTAT

=== Immigration ===
As of 2025, immigrants make up 11.4% of the total population. The 5 largest foreign countries of birth are Albania, Romania, Ukraine, Morocco, and Senegal.
