= Bolgheri =

- Frazione
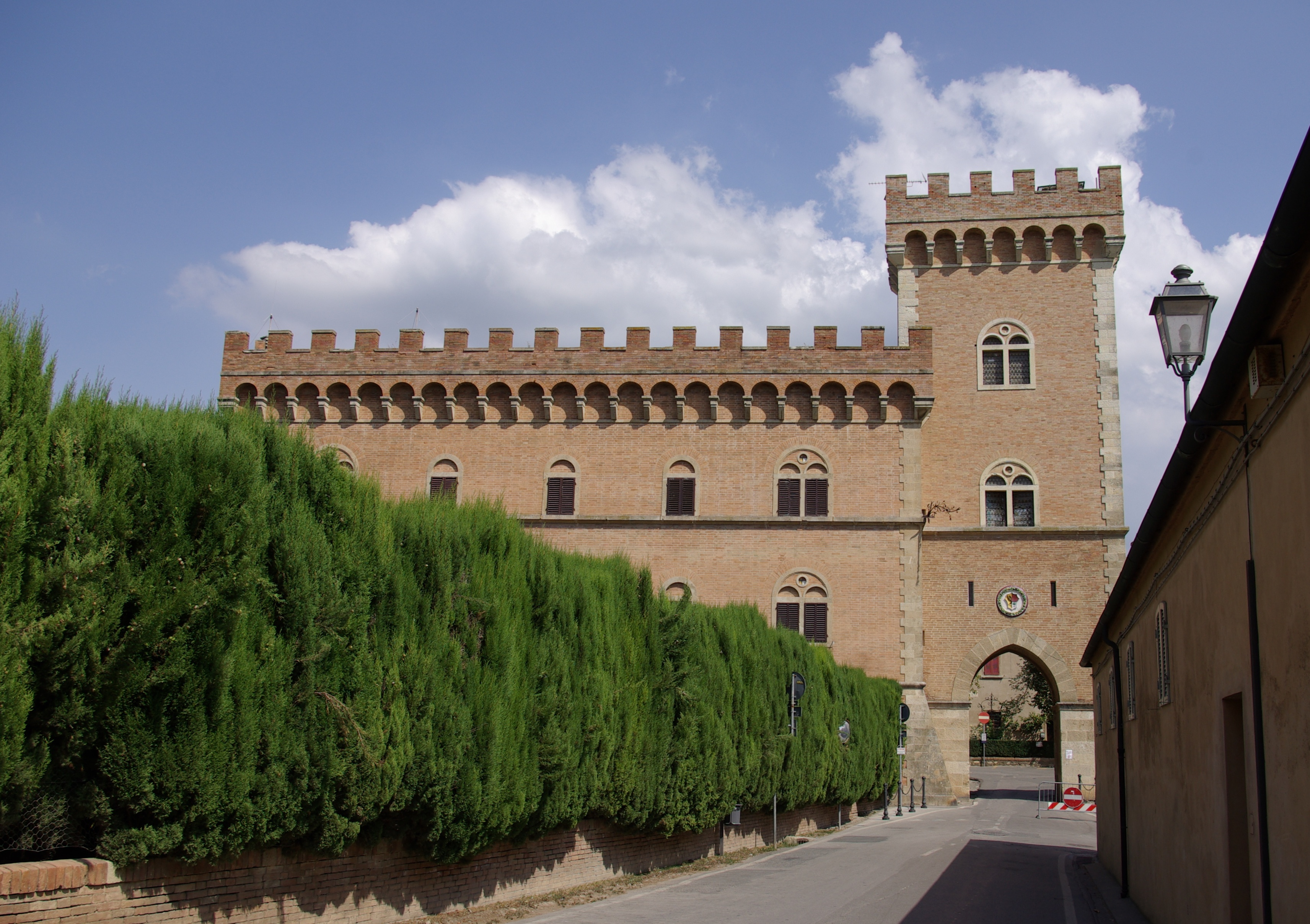
- The Bolgheri Castle

- Location of Bolgheri in Italy
- Coordinates: 43°14′02.0″N 10°37′02.0″E
- Country: Italy
- Region: Tuscany
- Province: Livorno (LI)
- Comune: Castagneto Carducci
- Elevation: 96 m (315 ft)

Population (2011)
  - Total: 131
- Demonym: Bolgheresi
- Time zone: UTC+1 (CET)
  - Summer (DST): UTC+2 (CEST)
- Postal code: 57020
- Dialing code: (+39) 0565

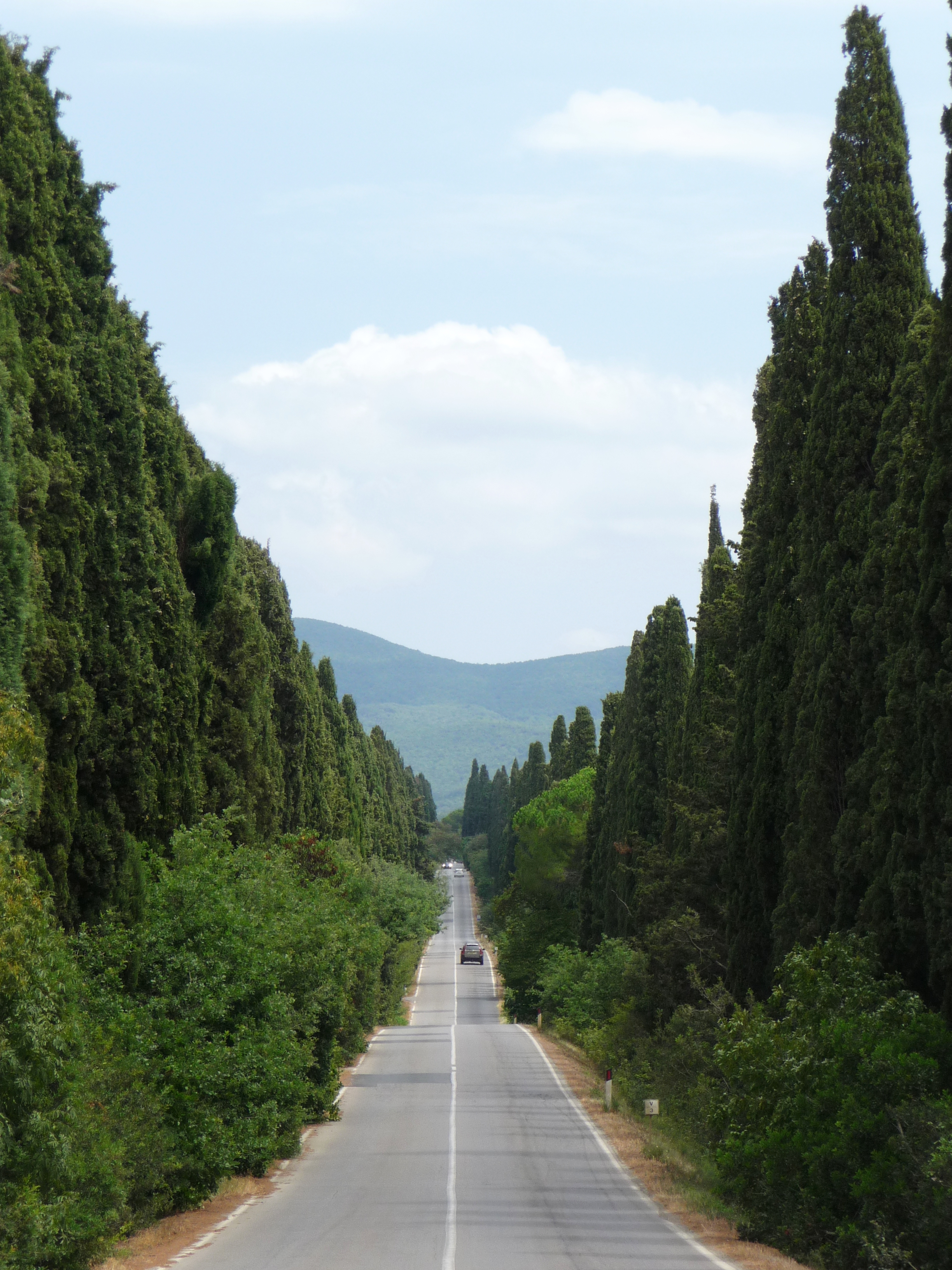
Viale dei Cipressi ("Cypresses Avenue")

Bolgheri (Italian: [ˈbolgeri]) is a central Italian village and hamlet (frazione) of Castagneto Carducci, a municipality (comune) in the province of Livorno, Tuscany. in 2011 it had a population of 131.

== History ==
First mentioned in 1075, in a papal bull by Pope Gregory VII, the toponym Bolgheri is of Lombard-era origin and might be derived from the presence of a military settlement of Bulgars (a semi-nomadic people who served as auxiliary cavalry in the Lombard army during the 7th–8th centuries). This etymology aligns with a series of similar place-names in northern and central Italy (e.g., Bolgare in Bergamo, Bulgarograsso in Como) that mark stations of the same Bulgar contingents. The Bulgarian-Lombard hypothesis, first proposed in the 19th century and later refined by scholars such as Giovan Battista Pellegrini, is today the prevailing view in Italian historical toponomastics.

The original Bulgar settlement lay in the plain near the present-day coastline. In the early Middle Ages the site was abandoned because of malaria and Saracen raids. Around the year 1000 the Counts Della Gherardesca, of Longobard origin and the most powerful feudal family of the Tuscan Maremma, built a new fortified castle on the nearby hill to control the surrounding territory and the final stretch of the Via Aurelia. The new stronghold took the name of the ancient settlement below (Castrum Bolgheris or Bolgeri), and the present village gradually developed around the castle. The imposing red-brick fortress, still dominated by the Della Gherardesca tower, and the gateway bearing their coat of arms remain the most distinctive landmarks of Bolgheri today.

== Geography ==
Bolgheri lies in the foothills of the Colline Metallifere, south of Bibbona (6 km [3.7 mi] north). It is 10 km (6.2 mi) from Casale Marittimo, 11 km (6.8 mi) from Donoratico, 12 km (7.5 mi) from Castagneto Carducci, 15 km (9.3 mi) from Cecina, 42 km (26 mi) from Piombino and 50 km (31 mi) from Livorno.

== Main sights ==
- San Sebastiano
- Santi Jacopo e Cristoforo
- Sant'Antonio
- Castle of Bolgheri

== Wine ==
Bolgheri became an internationally known region following an event in 1974 arranged by Decanter where a 6-year-old Sassicaia won over an assortment of Bordeaux wines. Prior to this, Bolgheri had been relatively anonymous producers of ordinary white wines and rosés.

Due to the particular characteristics of the soil and micro climate sunny, dry and moderately windy, the grape varieties of Bordeaux origin tend to thrive, such as Cabernet Sauvignon, Merlot, Cabernet Franc and Petit Verdot.

Among the most known "Super Tuscan" producers are Tenuta San Guido who produce Sassicaia, Tenuta Dell'Ornellaia who produce Ornellaia, Ca'Marcanda of Gaja, Guado al Tasso of Antinori, and newcomers like I Greppi who produce Greppicaia.

In 2017, in Bolgheri opened The World Wine Town of Castagneto Carducci – a wine center, created by entrepreneur Franco Malenotti and designed by the Oscar-winning art director Dante Ferretti. The Sensory and Multimedia Museum in Bolgheri is housed in a two-story building (dating back to the 1500s), exploring the history of wine and food from the region and featuring a wine tasting area.

=== Bolgheri DOC ===
The current set of DOC regulations for Bolgheri red wines became approved in 1994. Before the creation of this DOC, the "Super Tuscans" from the area were typically sold under the simpler designations Vino da tavola or IGT Toscana.

The appellation rules determine that in Bolgheri Rosso and Bolgheri Rosé, Sangiovese may be utilised only to a degree of 70%, and in excess of this a wine must be classified IGT. Cabernet Sauvignon from 10 to 80%, Merlot, up to 80% and other local red varieties, up to 30%. Rosso must be aged for 24 months.

For Bolgheri Bianco, Tuscan Trebbiano from 10 to 70%, Vermentino from 10 to 70%, Sauvignon blanc from 10 to 70% and other local white varieties, up to 30%.

Two varietal wines are permitted, Sauvignon blanc and Vermentino, of which there must be at least 85% of either grape variety.

For the appellation's pink Vin Santo, Occhio di Pernice, 50 to 70% Sangiovese, Malvasia from 50 to 70%, and up to 30% of other local red varieties. It must be aged for 36 months.

The sub-zone Sassicaia has its own appellation declaration, with up to 85% of Cabernet Sauvignon and 15% Cabernet Franc. Bolgheri Sassicaia must be aged for 26 months. It is expected to be upgraded to DOCG status.

== Transport ==
Bolgheri counts a minor train station on the Pisa–Rome railway, located 7 km (4.3 mi) away and next to Marina di Bibbona. It is 10 km (6.2 mi) north of the exit "Donoratico-Castagneto", of the state highway SS1 "Aurelia", a dual carriageway connecting the two sections of the A12 motorway Genoa-Rome.

== Gallery ==
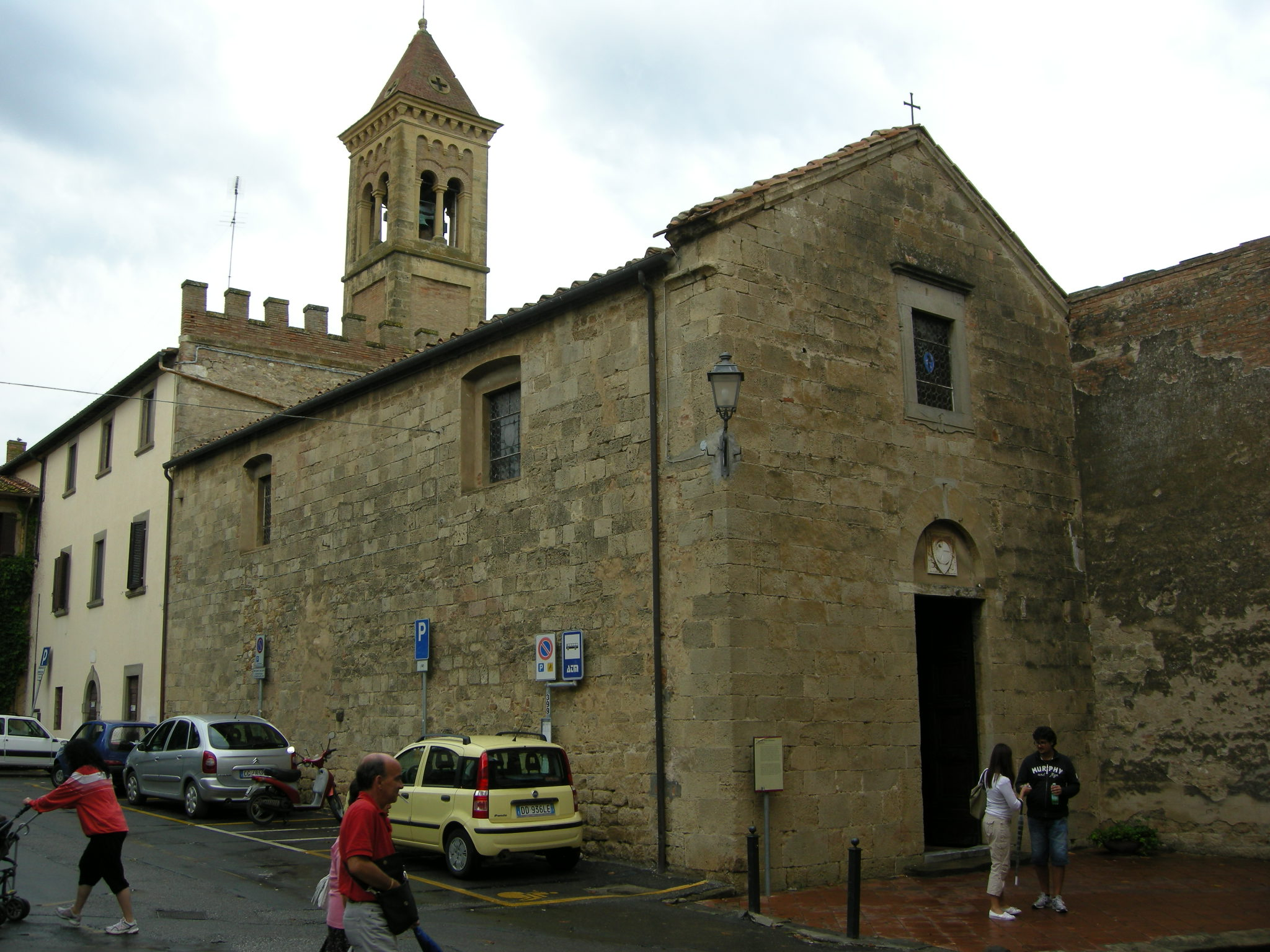
Santi Giacomo e Cristoforo Church

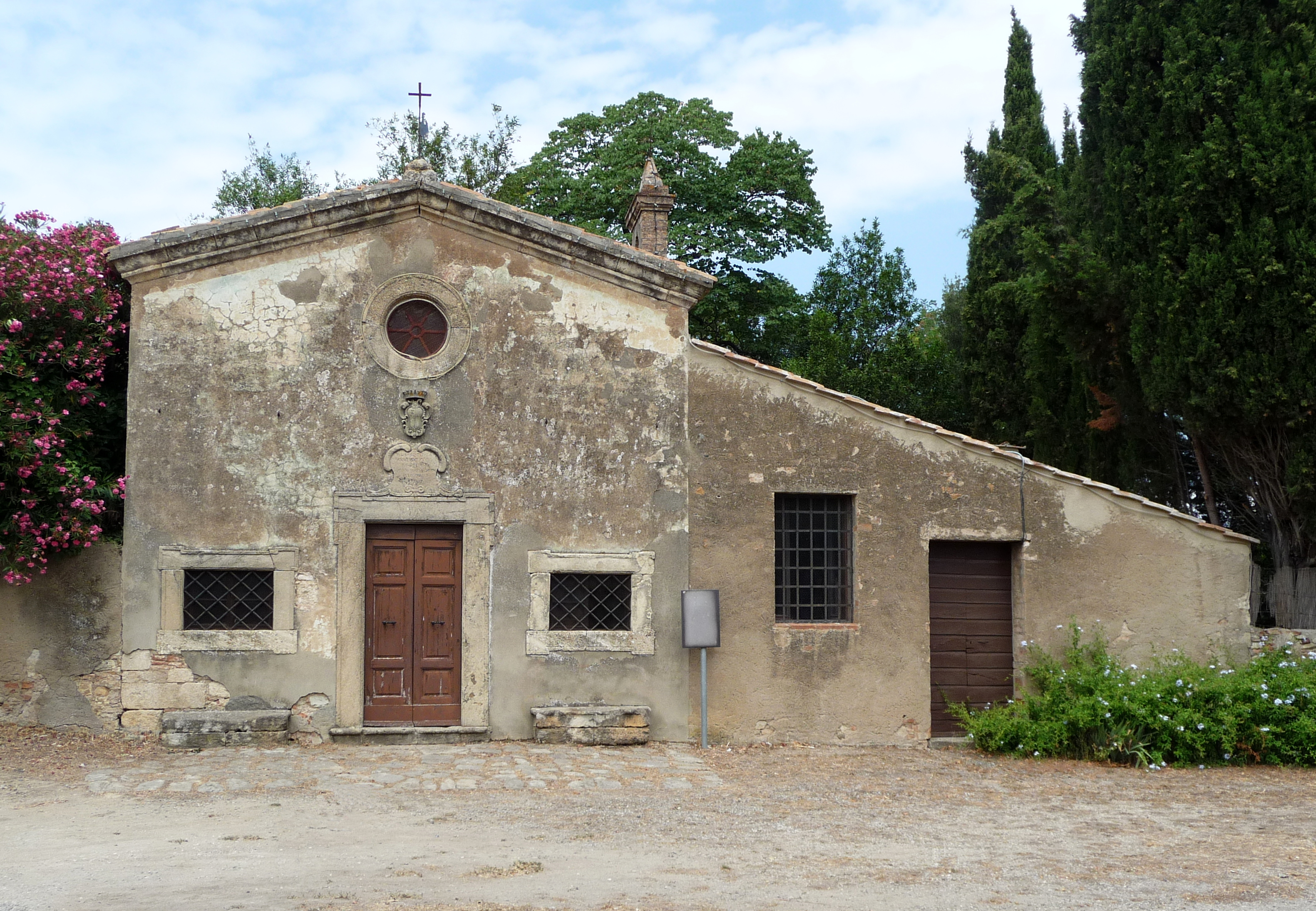
Sant'Antonio Church

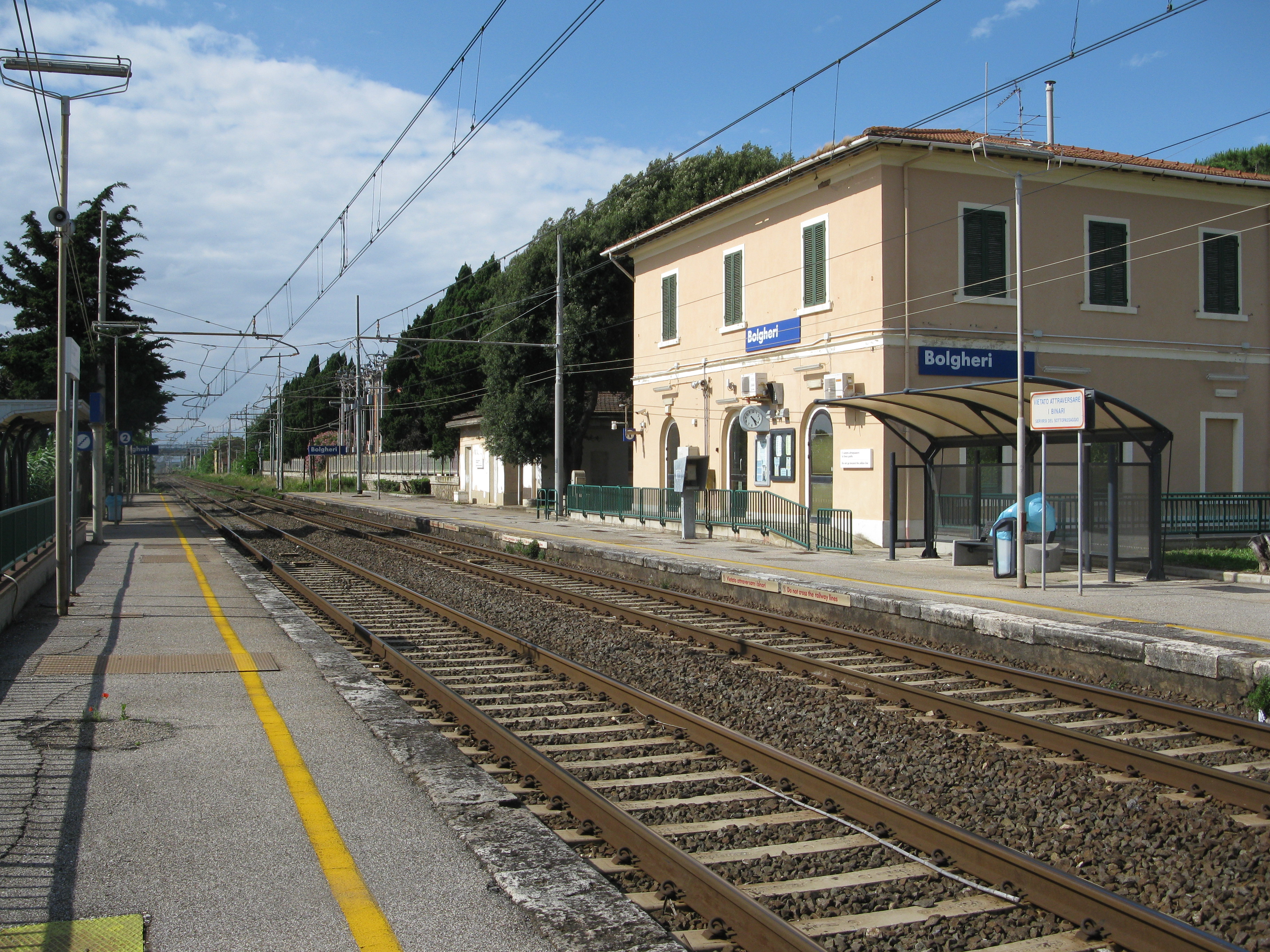
Bolgheri station

== Personalities ==
- Giosuè Carducci (1835–1907), poet and writer

== See also ==
- Tuscan wine
- Tenuta San Guido
