= Italo Insolera =

Italian architect, urban and land planner, and historian

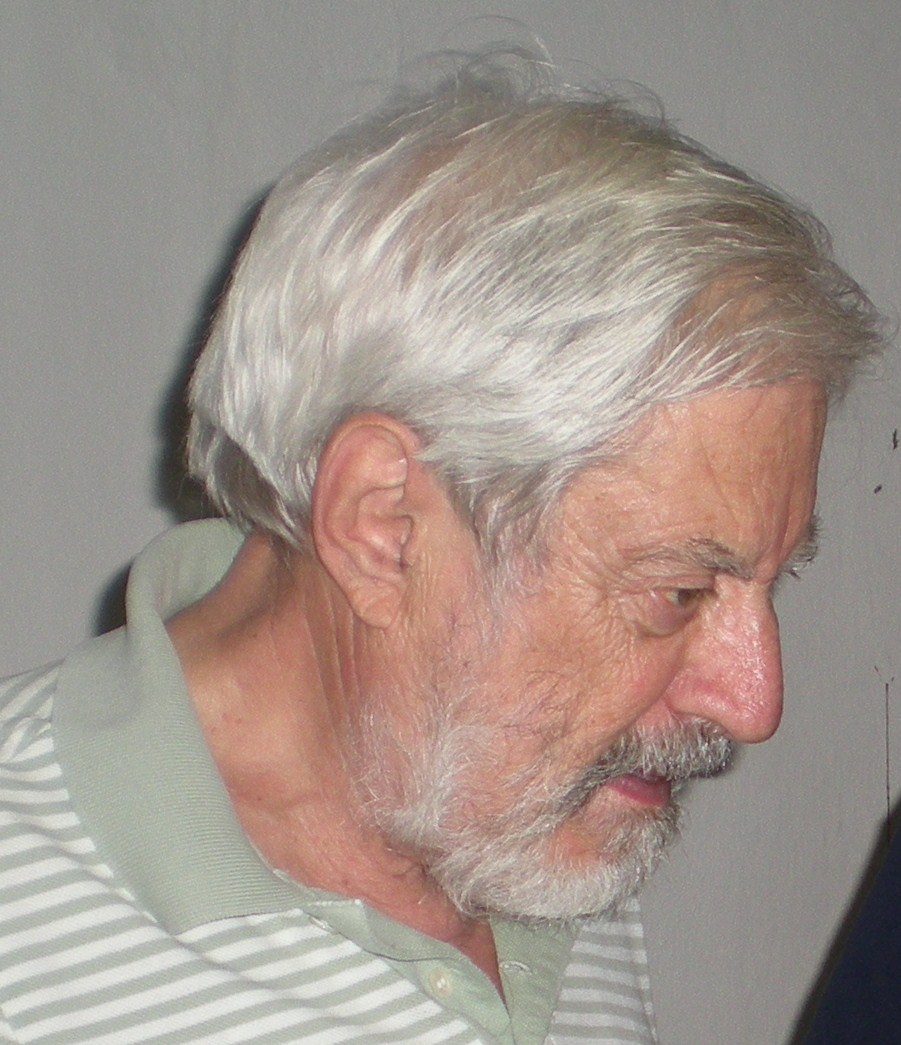
- Insolera in 2008
- Born: Italo Insolera; 7 February 1929; Turin, Kingdom of Italy
- Died: 27 August 2012 (aged 83); Rome, Italy
- Education: Sapienza University of Rome
- Occupations: Architect, urban planner, architectural historian

Italo Insolera (7 February 1929 – 27 August 2012) was an Italian architect, urban and land planner, and architectural historian.

He published several books and essays dealing with the economic, social and cultural circumstances and conditions of urban development, and the use of the ancient town in the framework of metropolitan development. These issues were also the primary focus of his professional and academic work, where restoration and planning of historical towns and environmental systems prevail. He was especially interested in the relationship between archaeology and the modern city; he proposed solutions for the correct (re)use of ancient towns that included traffic restriction, pedestrianization, and restoration. Some of these have been implemented by municipal governments, particularly in Rome.

== Biography ==
Born in Turin in 1929, at age five he and his family moved to Rome. His father Filadelfo, a university teacher, ranked amongst the few who introduced the financial and actuarial science in Italy. His elder brother Delfino was editorial director at Zanichelli publisher in the 1970s and 1980s; his sister Melina, high-school teacher, wrote a number of grammar books (Italian, Latin and ancient Greek).

In 1953, Insolera graduated from La Sapienza University, Rome, with a degree in Architecture. He became a licensed architect in 1954, and qualified for university teaching in urbanism in 1960. Meanwhile, he had married Anna Maria Bozzola (architect, in the early 1960s was the author of a book series on arts education which became a reference in the freshly reformed Italian lower secondary school); she would be his partner during all his life. In 1962, he published Roma moderna. Un secolo di storia urbanistica (Modern Rome: A Century of Urban History), the first book dealing with urban planning and management in Rome from the unification of Italy to the present. The book has subsequently gone through six editions, with the most recent published in 2011.

He was added to the official register of land planners in 1971. From 1963 to 1971, he was a lecturer at Venice University's Institute of Architecture, and from 1971 to 1983 he was a tenured professor of Urban History at Geneva University’s School of Architecture. He also taught courses and seminars at the universities of Rome, Florence, Naples, Paris, Kassel, Barcelona and Madrid.

During his tenure in Geneva, he founded and was for four years at the head of the Centre de Recherche sur la Rénovation Urbaine (Research Centre on Urban Renovation), sponsored by the Swiss National Science Foundation.

Insolera also long played a leading role in numerous environmental battles over landscape conservation and protection, as well as urban architectural heritage protection and revitalization.

He died of natural causes at age 83 in his house in Monteverde, Rome at dawn on August 27, 2012. Italian urban planners deeply mourn his passing.

Since 2003, all of Insolera's professional documents, designs, photos and writings have been deemed of public interest and protected by the Italian Superintendence of Archives.

== Planning ==
=== Regional planning ===
- 1963 – 1964 Gargano Coast (Apulia)
- 1965 – 1966 Province of Teramo (Abruzzo)
- 1965 – 1970 Gallura (Sardinia), Coast and Hinterland
- 1968 – 1969 Province of Nuoro (Sardinia), Coast
- 1973 – 1976 Umbrian Apennines
- 1984 – 1992 Crotone (Calabria), Cape Colonna Archaeological Park
- 1982 – 1992 Parks in the municipalities of Suvereto, Campiglia Marittima, Piombino (Province of Leghorn, Tuscany), and Follonica (Province of Grosseto, Tuscany)
- 1985 Spatial and Landscape Plan (in Italian: "Piano Territoriale-paesistico") of Emilia-Romagna Region (pursuant to National Law 431/85).

=== Urban planning ===
- 1956 Porto Empedocle (Province of Agrigento, Sicily), Reconstruction Plan
- 1957 Rivisondoli (Province of L’Aquila, Abruzzo), Reconstruction Plan
- 1967 – 1972 Coordinated Plans for the communes of Cecina, Bibbona, Castagneto Carducci, San Vincenzo, Sassetta (Province of Leghorn, Tuscany; joint work)
- 1969 – 1970 Coordinated Building Programmes for the communes of Dorgali, Orosei, Siniscola (Province of Nuoro, Sardinia; joint work)
- 1973 – 1978 General Master Plan for the commune of Leghorn (Tuscany)
- 1988 – 1996 General Master Plan for the commune of Pitigliano (Province of Grosseto, Tuscany; joint work)
- 1989 – 1994 General Master Plan for the commune of Correggio (Province of Reggio Emilia, Emilia-Romagna; joint work)
- 1997 – 1999 Structural Plan for Lucca (Tuscany, joint work).

=== Parks and urban districts ===
- 1957 INA-Casa District (public housing) at Syracuse Santa Panagia (Sicily, joint work)
- 1958 INA-Casa District (public housing) at Naples Soccavo (joint work)
- 1962 INA-Casa District (public housing) at Caserta (Campania; joint work)
- 1971 - 1978 Public housing district at San Vincenzo (Province of Leghorn, Tuscany; joint work)
- 1980 - 1981 Special Plans (in Italian: "Piani Particolareggiati") for Castagneto Carducci (Province of Leghorn, Tuscany; joint work)
- 1982 - 1984 Plans for Productive Zones (tourist resorts; in Italian: PIP, "Piani per Insediamenti Produttivi") at Piombino (Province of Leghorn, Tuscany; joint work)
- 1988 Feasibility Plan for Gabii Archaeological Park (Rome; joint work)
- 1988 - 1989 Together with Leonardo Benevolo and Pier Luigi Cervellati, studies for Palermo’s historical core Special Plan (appointing body: the Municipality, Mayor Leoluca Orlando)
- 1996 Preliminaries to the Spatial Plan (in Italian: "Piano di Assetto") for the Archaeological Park of the Ancient Appian Way (Rome)
- 1997 Environmental Project for Rome's great ring road underpass to the Ancient Appian Way (ANAS, National Agency for Roads)
- 2000 Environmental and Landscape Study for it:Tormarancio area (Rome; joint work, appointing body: Rome's Archaeological Superintendence)
- 2005 Project for a Natural Park and Farm Restoration at San Vincenzo (Province of Leghorn, Tuscany; appointing body: Rimigliano ltd; joint work).

=== Consultancies ===
- 1965 Ministry of Public Works (now Ministry for Infrastructure and Transports), Committee for provisions to be adopted on tree-lined roads in order to ensure traffic safety and natural values protection
- 1966 Municipality of Rome, Committee for study of pedestrian islands
- 1966-1969 Italian Automobile Club, Committee for traffic and circulation
- 1981-1982 Municipality of Naples, Commissionership for reconstruction subsequent to 1981 earthquake
- 1981-1982 Intergovernmental Programme Egypt-Italy, Feasibility study for restoration and reuse of Cairo Citadel
- 1981-1982 Municipality of Rome, Committee for study of issues related to establishment of the Archaeological Park in the city historical centre
- 1988-1990 Museum of Natural History of Leghorn Province, member of the Board of governors
- 1988-1992 Member of the National Council at the Ministry of Cultural Heritage
- 1990-1992 Province of Bologna, land planning
- 1994-1995 Municipality of Rome, Department for Mobility
- 1995-1996 ATAC (Municipal Company for Public Transport), Rome
- Council of Europe, member of the Committees for restoration and reuse of the historical cores of Toledo (Spain, 1982), Salamanca (Spain, 1984), and Antigua Guatemala (Guatemala, 1997)
- Council of Europe, general speaker at Ferrara (1978), Strasbourg (1982) and Lille (1983) conventions.

== Architecture ==
- 1958-1964 Turin National Library (together with Massimo Amodei, Pasquale Carbonara, Aldo Livadiotti, Antonio Quistelli).
- 1958 Nursery School at Rivisondoli (Province of L’Aquila, Abruzzo)
- 1959 Nursery School at Pescocostanzo (Province of L’Aquila, Abruzzo)
- 2001 Studies for the Moses Memorial at Mount Nebo (Jordan)
- 2003 Plan for the Puccini Theatre at Torre del Lago (Viareggio, Tuscany; together with Mauro Ciampa, Raffaello Bartelletti).

== Restoration works ==
- 1963-1965-1967 Houses in the centre of Anguillara Sabazia (Rome)
- 1971 House in the historical centre of Tropea (Calabria)
- 1980 House in the historical centre of Castagneto Carducci (Tuscany)
- 1978-1980 and 1993-1994 Ancient Roman houses at San Paolo alla Regola Street, Rome (joint work)
- 1990 Mullioned-windowed house (in Italian: “Casa delle Bifore”) at Piombino (Tuscany), hosting the Municipal Archives (joint work)
- 1990 St. Francis Cloister at Suvereto (Province of Leghorn, Tuscany; joint work)
- 1989-1992 Meucci Center at Suvereto (Tuscany; joint work): an ancient farmhouse to be reused as residence for maladjusted youths
- 1990-1995 Villa Poniatowski in Rome, preliminary project for reuse to host a section of Villa Giulia’s National Etruscan Museum and the Castellani Collection (ancient jewellery)
- 1991-1994 House on the Lake Maggiore (Piedmont)
- 1996 “La Pievaccia” Tower at Follonica (Province of Grosseto, Tuscany; joint work)
- 2000-2001 Poderi Stalloni at Suvereto (Tuscany): ancient farmhouses to be reused as hostels and function-room for Parchi Val di Cornia Inc. (joint work).

== Exhibitions ==
- 1997: Via Appia-Sulle rovine della magnificenza antica (Appian Way – Amidst the ruins of the ancient splendour), Memmo Foundation, Ruspoli Palace, Rome; layout project
- In collaboration with the Granet Museum, Aix-en-Provence (France):
  - 1996: Paesaggi perduti-Granet a Roma 1802-1824 (Lost Landscapes – Granet in Rome 1802-1824), American Academy in Rome, Scientific Committee
  - 2000: Alla ricerca della luce-I pittori di Aix-en-Provence dal XVIII al XX Secolo (Searching for Light – The Painters from Aix-en-Provence from 18th to 20th Centuries), Municipality of Perugia, Palace of Penna; curator of both exhibition and catalogue
  - 2000-2001: Frondose arcate. Il Colosseo prima dell'archeologia (Leafy Arcades – The Coliseum before Archaeology), Rome's Archaeological Superintendence, Altemps Palace, project, layout and catalogue
- 2002-2003: Roma tra le due guerre (Rome between the two Wars), Museo di Roma in Trastevere and House of Architecture, Rome; project and layout (with A.M. Sette)
- 2002-2003: Dall'Augusteo all'Auditorium (From the Augusteum to the Auditorium), for the opening of the new Auditorium “Parco della Musica”, Rome; project, layout and catalogue (with A.M. Sette).

== Competitions and competitive examinations ==
- 1955 Spatial layout of the “Valletta di Belfiore” area, Mantua (Lombardy; joint work): 1st prize equal
- 1955 Establishment of designers-architects teams for INA-Casa (public housing programme): qualified
- 1957 Venice General Master Plan (in Italian: “Piano Regolatore Generale”; joint work)
- 1957 Turin National Library (joint work): 1st prize equal; realized
- 1958 Applications of “Plastirivmel” (plastic elements for use in interior design), 4th Competition: 2nd prize, realized
- 1964 Setting up of registers of designers-architects for it:Gescal (public housing programme): qualified
- 1965 Selection of ISES (public housing) designers-architects: qualified
- 1967 Extension to the House of Parliament, Rome
- 1971 New headquarters for the University of Florence (joint work): 2nd prize
- 1982 Restoration of Piombino Castle (Province of Leghorn, Tuscany; joint work)
- 2003 Puccini Theatre at Torre del Lago, Viareggio (Tuscany): winner.

== Bibliography ==
=== Books ===
- Roma moderna. Un secolo di storia urbanistica (Modern Rome. A Century of Urban History), Torino, Einaudi, 1962-1993-2001, ISBN 88-06-15931-3.
- Il quartiere barocco di Roma ( The Baroque District of Rome), Roma, Ed. LEA, 1967 (with Italo Zannier)
- Coste d'Italia (Coasts of Italy), Roma, ENI, 1967-1971, 5 volumes (joint work)
- Monti d'Italia (Mounts of Italy), Roma, ENI, 1972-1975, 4 volumes (joint work)
- Città di Torino, La collina di Torino (The Hills of Turin), Padova, Marsilio, 1972 (joint work).
- L'urbanistica, in "Storia d'Italia" (Urban Planning, in History of Italy), Torino, Einaudi, 1973
- La città e la crisi del capitalismo (The Cities and the Crisis of Capitalism), Roma, it:Ed. Laterza, 1978 (joint work)
- Roma. Immagini e realtà dal X al XX secolo (Rome: Images and Reality from 10th to 20th Centuries), it:Ed. Laterza, 1980, ISBN 978-88-420-1758-5
- Parchi naturali: l'esperienza di Rimigliano (Natural Parks: the Rimigliano Experience), Roma, Edizioni delle Autonomie, 1982 (with Luigi Gazzola)
- Storia moderna dei Fori di Roma (Modern History of Rome's Forums), Roma, it:Ed. Laterza, 1983 (with Francesco Perego), ISBN 978-88-420-5910-3.
- L'EUR e Roma dagli anni Trenta al Duemila (The EUR and Rome from the 1930s to 2000), Roma, it:Ed. Laterza, 1986 (with it:Luigi Di Majo), ISBN 88-420-2797-9.
- Roma (Rome), Touring Club of Italy, 1986 (joint work), ISBN 88-365-0284-9.
- La villa Huffer, una dimora romana dell'Ottocento (The Huffer Villa: a 19th Century Roman Mansion), Roma, Istituto Italiano di Credito Fondiario, 1991 (joint work)
- In via delle Muratte. Un edificio e l'intorno nella storia di Roma (Down Muratte Street: a Building and its Neighbourhood in the History of Rome), Roma, Ed. Mediocredito di Roma, 1993 (joint work)
- Roma e il Giubileo del secondo Millennio (Rome and the Second Millennium Jubilee), Roma, Ed. Mediocredito di Roma, 1995 (joint work)
- Paesaggi perduti, Granet a Roma 1802 – 1824, American Academy in Rome (Lost Landscapes – Granet in Rome 1802-1824, American Academy in Rome), Roma, Electa, 1996 (contribution to the catalogue), ISBN 88-435-5894-3.
- Via Appia, Sulle ruine della magnificenza antica (Appian Way – Amidst the ruins of the ancient splendour), Roma, Leonardo Arte, 1997 (catalogue of the exhibition; joint work), ISBN 88-7813-776-6.
- Frondose arcate, Il Colosseo prima dell'archeologia (Leafy Arcades – The Coliseum before Archaeology), Roma, Electa, 2000 (catalogue of the exhibition; joint work), ISBN 88-435-7831-6.
- Roma fascista attraverso la documentazione dell'Istituto Luce (Fascist Rome in the Istituto Luce’s Documents), Roma, it:Editori Riuniti, 2001, ISBN 88-359-5028-7.
- Roma tra le due guerre. Cronache da una città che cambia (Rome between the Two Wars, Chronicles from a Changing City), Roma, Palombi Editore, 2003 (with Alessandra Maria Sette), ISBN 88-7621-412-7.
- Dall'Augusteo all'Auditorium (From the Augusteum to the Auditorium), Roma, Ed. Musica per Roma, Collana dell’Auditorium no. 1, 2003 (with Alessandra Maria Sette), ISBN 88-900980-3-1.
- L'occhio e la memoria: Porto Empedocle 1950 (The Eye and Memory: Porto Empedocle 1950), Roma, Palombi Editore, 2007 (with Andrea Camilleri), ISBN 978-88-6060-089-9.
- Saper vedere l'ambiente (Getting to Know how to Look at the Environment), Roma, De Luca Edizioni d’Arte, 2008, ISBN 88-8016-792-8.
- Avanti c'è posto (Move on, there's room ahead!), Roma, it:Donzelli Editore, 2008 (with it:Walter Tocci and Domitilla Morandi), ISBN 978-88-6036-276-6.
- Roma, per esempio. Le città e l'urbanista (Rome, for example. The cities and the urban planner), Roma, it:Donzelli Editore, 2010, ISBN 978-88-6036-458-6.
- Roma moderna. Da Napoleone I al XXI secolo (Modern Rome. From Napoleon I to 21st Century), Torino, Einaudi, 2011 (New edition expanded with the collaboration of it:Paolo Berdini), ISBN 978-88-06-20876-9.
- Modern Rome: From Napoleon to the Twenty-First Century, Newcastle upon Tyne, Cambridge Scholars Publishing, 2021 (First English paperback edition, based on the above; editors Lucia Bozzola, Roberto Einaudi and Marco Zumaglini), ISBN 978-1-5275-4795-7.
- The Centre de recherche sur la rénovation urbaine (Research Centre on Urban Renovation) published: Atlas du territoire genevois – Permanences et modifications cadastrales aux XIXe et XXe Siècles (Atlas of Geneva Territory, Cadastral Permanencies and Modifications during 19th and 20th Centuries), 7 volumes, Genève, Georg Ed., 1983-1998 (foreword by A.Corboz).

=== Journals and newspapers ===
Articles published on: Ferrania, Architettura, Urbanistica, Comunità, Casabella, Zodiac, Architèse, Werk, Centro Sociale, Ulisse, Paese Sera, Il Messaggero, Il Manifesto, La Repubblica, Il Corriere della Sera.

== Radio and TV collaborations ==
- RAI, Italian State Radio-television
- RTS, Radio-television of French-Switzerland.

== Awards ==
- Aldo Della Rocca Foundation Award, 1954.
- INARCH Award for Historical Criticism, 1964.
- Cervia Award, 1970.
- Italian Fund for the Environment (FAI) Award, 2008.

== Writings on Italo Insolera ==
- Elisabetta Reale, Archivi Italo Insolera e Ignazio Guidi (the Archives Italo Insolera and Ignazio Guidi), sheet on "AAA Italia. Bollettino n.9/2010", p. 31-33, May 2010.
- Alessandra Valentinelli et al., Italo Insolera fotografo (Italo Insolera photographer), Roma, Palombi Editore, 2017, ISBN 978-88-6060-769-0; the exhibition held at Museo di Roma in Trastevere (11 May-3 September 2017), at Palazzo Gravina, Faculty of Architecture, Naples (5-19 November 2018) and at Polo del '900, Turin (17 September-18 October 2020).
