= Ornellaia =

Italian wine producer

Coordinates: 43.2115227°N 10.6094568°E

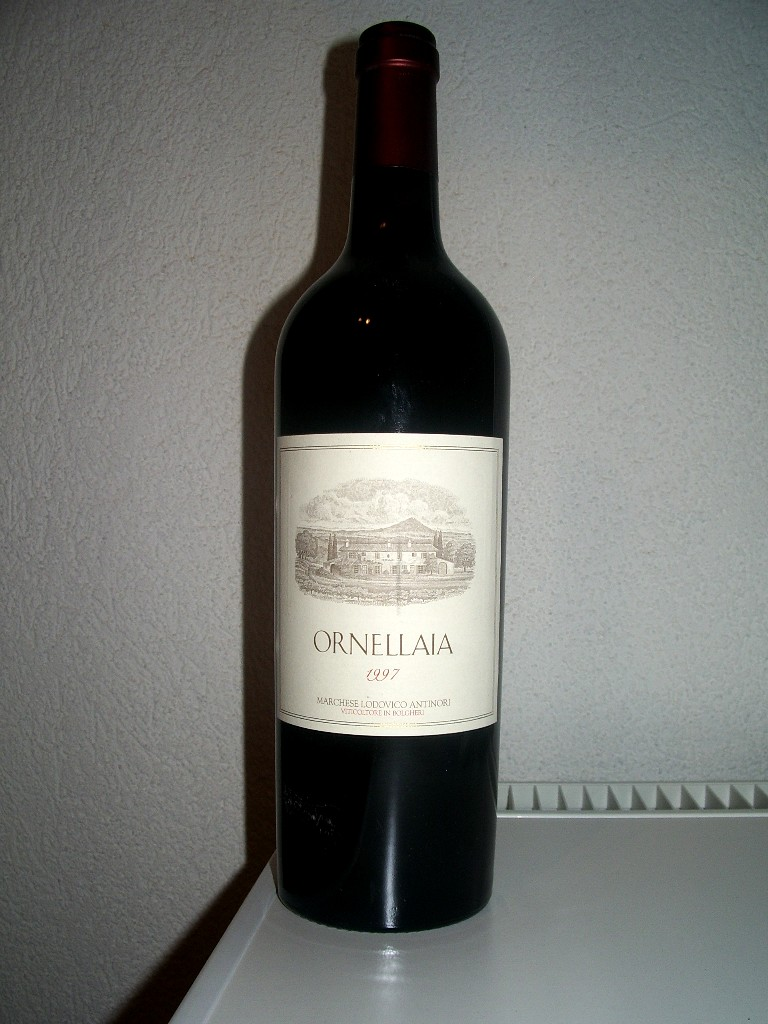
A bottle of Ornellaia of the 1997 vintage

Ornellaia is an Italian wine producer in the DOC Bolgheri in Toscana, known as a producer of Super Tuscan wine. Ornellaia is considered one of Italy's leading Bordeaux-style red wines. The estate also produces a second wine, Le Serre Nuove, the blend Le Volte, the Merlot-labeled varietal wine Masseto, a second wine of Masseto (Massetino, a blend of Merlot and Cabernet Franc), in addition to estate production of grappa and olive oil. In 2012, the winery's name was changed from "Tenuta dell'Ornellaia" to "Ornellaia e Masseto", in recognition of the increasing importance of the Merlot-based wine.

== History ==
Ornellaia was established by Marchese Lodovico Antinori of the Antinori family, behind one of Italy's most historic négociant firms, with the help of winemaker Tibor Gál. The property is adjacent to Tenuta San Guido, producer of Sassicaia, which is considered the original "Super Tuscan". Ornellaia has been described as Lodovico Antinori's competitive answer to his cousin Nicolò Incisa's Sassicaia, and his older brother Piero Antinori's Solaia.

The vineyards of the estate were planted in 1981, producing the first vintage in 1985. A modern winery was built in 1987, and a second 56 ha (140-acre) property was later added, Bellaria, situated north of Bolgheri.

Robert Mondavi Winery took a minority interest in the estate in November 1999, and were full owners by 2002, while initiating a partnership with the Frescobaldi family. In April 2005, Frescobaldi bought the remaining half of the shares of Ornellaia from Constellation Brands after their acquisition of Mondavi holdings, coming to own the whole estate. Axel Heinz was winemaker until 2023 with Michel Rolland, involved with the estate since its beginning, retained as consultant oenologist.

The sequence of ownership is featured in Jonathan Nossiter's film Mondovino and documentary series of the same name, which contain statements by Lodovico Antinori, and the Frescobaldi and Mondavi families, then joint owners during the time of production, which displays opposing accounts on the events.

A Salmanazar (9 L bottle) of Ornellaia 2005 was sold for USD$33,600 at Christie's of New York.

== Vineyards ==
Ornellaia is located on the Tuscan Coast, overlooking the Tyrrhenian Sea, in the section of the Northern Maremma between Livorno and the island of Elba. The vineyards extend over two adjacent areas that are separated by Bolgheri's famed Cypress Avenue. There are 99 ha of vineyards in all, 41 surrounding the Tenuta, and the remaining 58 in an area known as Bellaria, which is closer to the sea.

The vineyards are planted at altitudes ranging from 50 to 120 m above sea level, on slopes ranging from 5 to 20°. Planting density per ha ranges from 5,000 vines per ha in the older vineyards of the Estate to 7,000 vines per ha in the Bellaria vineyards. By comparison, some of the most recent vineyards can have up to 8,700 vines per ha. Ornellaia's 97 ha of vineyards are divided into 50 parcels planted to the four varieties: Cabernet Sauvignon (38 ha), Cabernet Franc (12 ha), Merlot (38 ha), Petit Verdot (7 ha), and varieties Sauvignon blanc (2,5 ha), Viognier (0,5 ha) and Petit Manseng (1 ha).

=== Production ===
From a 91 ha (220-acre) estate, the vineyard area extends 76 ha (190 acres) in two separate locations, Ornellaia and Bellaria. The grape varieties are predominantly Cabernet Sauvignon, Merlot and Cabernet Franc, as well as a small plot of Petit Verdot planted in 1995.

In addition to Ornellaia, Merlot grapes from the 7 ha (17 acres) Masseto vineyard have since 1986 been produced as a varietal wine, initially simply as "Merlot", and since its second vintage by the name Masseto. Le Volte, first released in 1991, is a 50% Sangiovese and 50% Cabernet Sauvignon and Merlot blend. The official second wine, Le Serre Nuove, has been produced since 1997. The second wine of Masseto, Massetino, is a blend of Merlot and Cabernet Franc, and has been made since the 2017 vintage (released 2019).
