= Giacomo Tachis =

Italian oenologist (1933–2016)

- Born: 4 November 1933; Poirino, Italy
- Died: 6 February 2016 (aged 82); Florence, Italy
- Occupation: Oenologist

Giacomo Tachis (4 November 1933 – 6 February 2016) was an Italian oenologist. Known as the father of Super Tuscan wines, he has been credited with having kickstarted Italy's wine renaissance.

== Biography ==
Born in Poirino, Piedmont, in 1954 Tachis graduated from the Enological School of Alba, and in 1961 he was chosen as junior oenologist at Antinori's San Casciano in Val di Pesa cellars in Tuscany. He soon rose to the role of technical director, and his commitment with Antinori eventually lasted 32 years.

During his career, Tachis collaborated on creating new genres of Italian red wine, notably Sassicaia, Solaia and Tignanello (known as the "SuperTuscans"), San Leonardo, Terre Brune and Turriga. He made innovative choices for his time, such as exceeding the area specification for Chianti Classico, using the malolactic fermentation and using barriques for the aging periods, so that the barrique "became one of the symbols of the Italian wine renaissance". In addition to wines he created, he promoted and collaborated to the production of several other wines, including the Sardinian Vermentino and Carignano del Sulcis, the Sicilian Nero d'Avola, Inzolia, Cataratto and Grillo, the Piedmontese Barbera and Nebbiolo, Lambrusco from Reggio Emilia and Sangiovese from Tuscany.

Tachis officially retired in April 2010, but still continued to consult; the same year he published his autobiography, Sapore di vino. In 2011 the magazine Decanter named Tachis as their "Man of the Year".
