= San Sebastiano, Bolgheri =

Church building in Bolgheri, Italy

Coordinates: 43°14′1.67″N 10°36′50.94″E

San Sebastiano is a small, neo-gothic-style, Roman Catholic church located on Viale dei Cipressi in Bolgheri, a village in the municipality of Castagneto Carducci, province of Livorno, Tuscany, Italy.

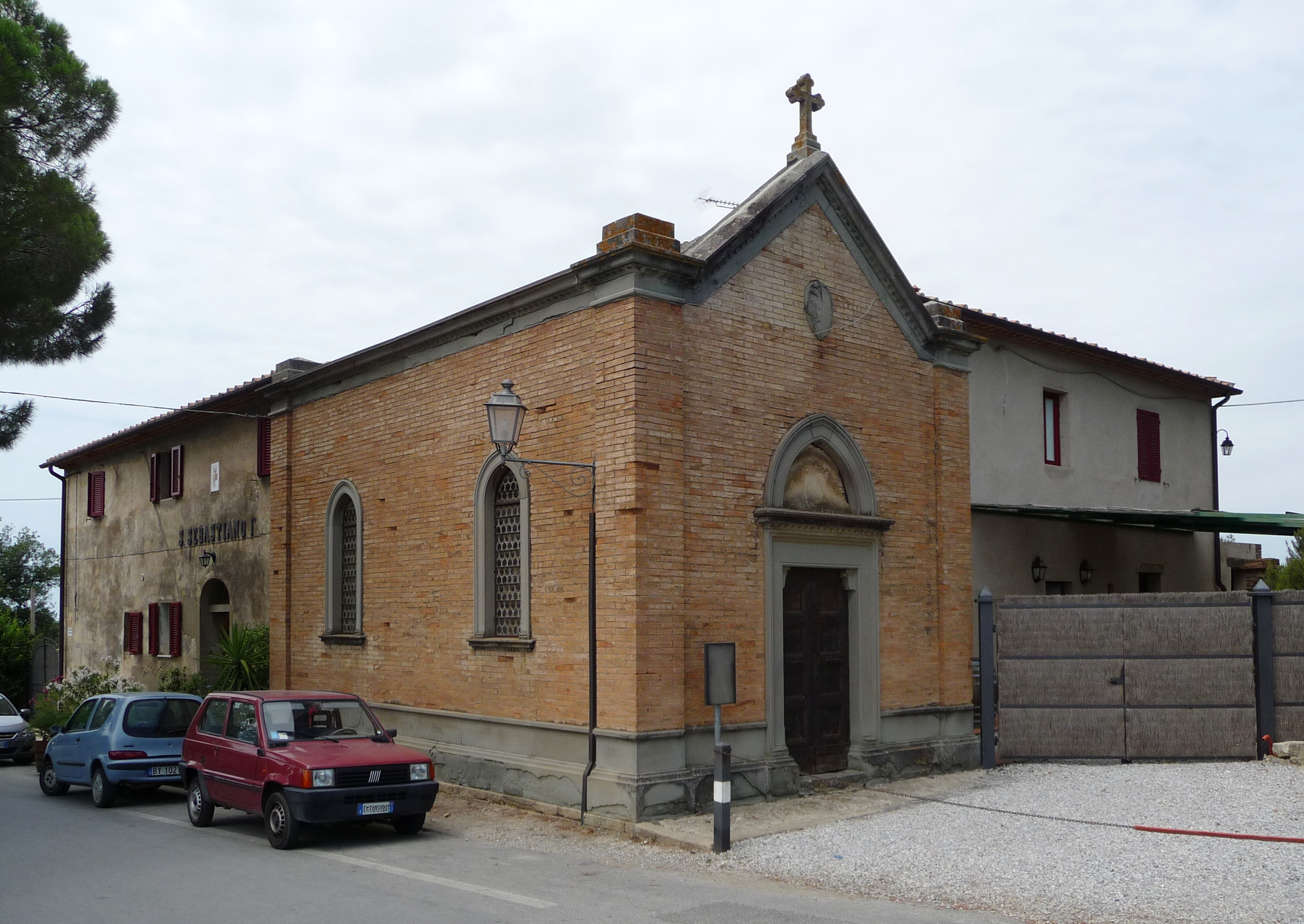
Church of San Sebastiano

== History ==
This brick church was erected in the late 19th century, and has a portal with fragments of a mural depicting Ecce Homo. The mouldings and the cross atop the tympanum are stone. Above the entrance is the crest of the Della Gherardesca family; the church contains family tombs. The interior apse is frescoed with a Madonna and child. The remainder of the church has floral and geometric decorations.
