= Sant'Antonio, Bolgheri =

Church building in Bolgheri, Italy

Coordinates: 43°14′03″N 10°36′58″E

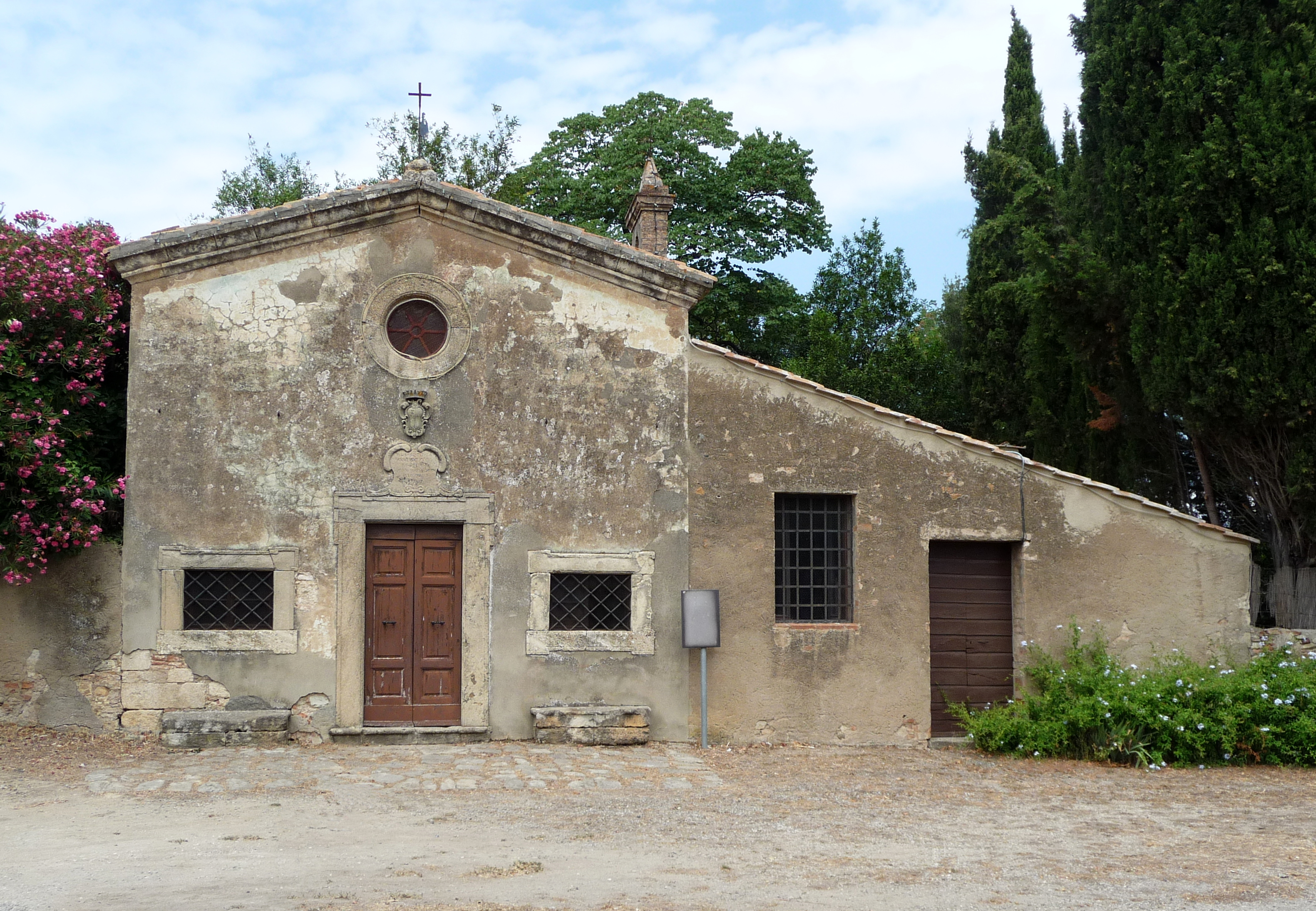
Sant'Antonio Church in Bolgheri, Tuscany, Italy

Sant'Antonio is a small baroque-style, Roman Catholic church or chapel located in the town of Bolgheri, in the municipality of Castagneto Carducci, province of Livorno, Tuscany, Italy.

== History ==
The church was erected in 1686 in celebration of the liberation of Budapest from the Ottoman rule after the Battle of Buda by Count Simone Maria Della Gherardesca, knight of the Tuscan Order of Santo Stefano, whose family crest is found on the facade below an oculus. Behind the altar is a depiction of the town and castle, and an altarpiece depicting the Ecstasy of St Anthony of Padua, the titular saint.
