= Santi Jacopo e Cristoforo, Bolgheri =

Church building in Bolgheri, Italy

Coordinates: 43°14′02″N 10°37′01″E

Santi Jacopo e Cristoforo is a small Roman Catholic church or chapel located in the village of Bolgheri, in the municipality of Castagneto Carducci, province of Livorno, Tuscany, Italy.

== History ==
A church of this name was located inside the town castle by about the year 1000. The Antipope Nicholas V took refuge here in 1329. After the castle was destroyed in 1492, the present church was erected 1505-1515 using stones from this castle. One wall derives from medieval construction. The church is dedicated to San Jacopo Baronto of Pistoia. The stone church underwent a major restoration in 1902 patronized by count Alberto Guido. The portal has a marble crest of the Della Gherardesca family. The interior has faux marble decoration, while the entrance to the sacristy has depictions of the titular saints.
