= Modern Rome (disambiguation) =

Modern Rome is a painting by G. P. Panini (1757).

Modern Rome may also refer to:

- Modern Rome – Campo Vaccino, a painting by J. M. W. Turner (1839)
- Modern Rome: From Napoleon to the Twenty-First Century, a book by historian I. Insolera
