= Marina di Bibbona =

- Frazione
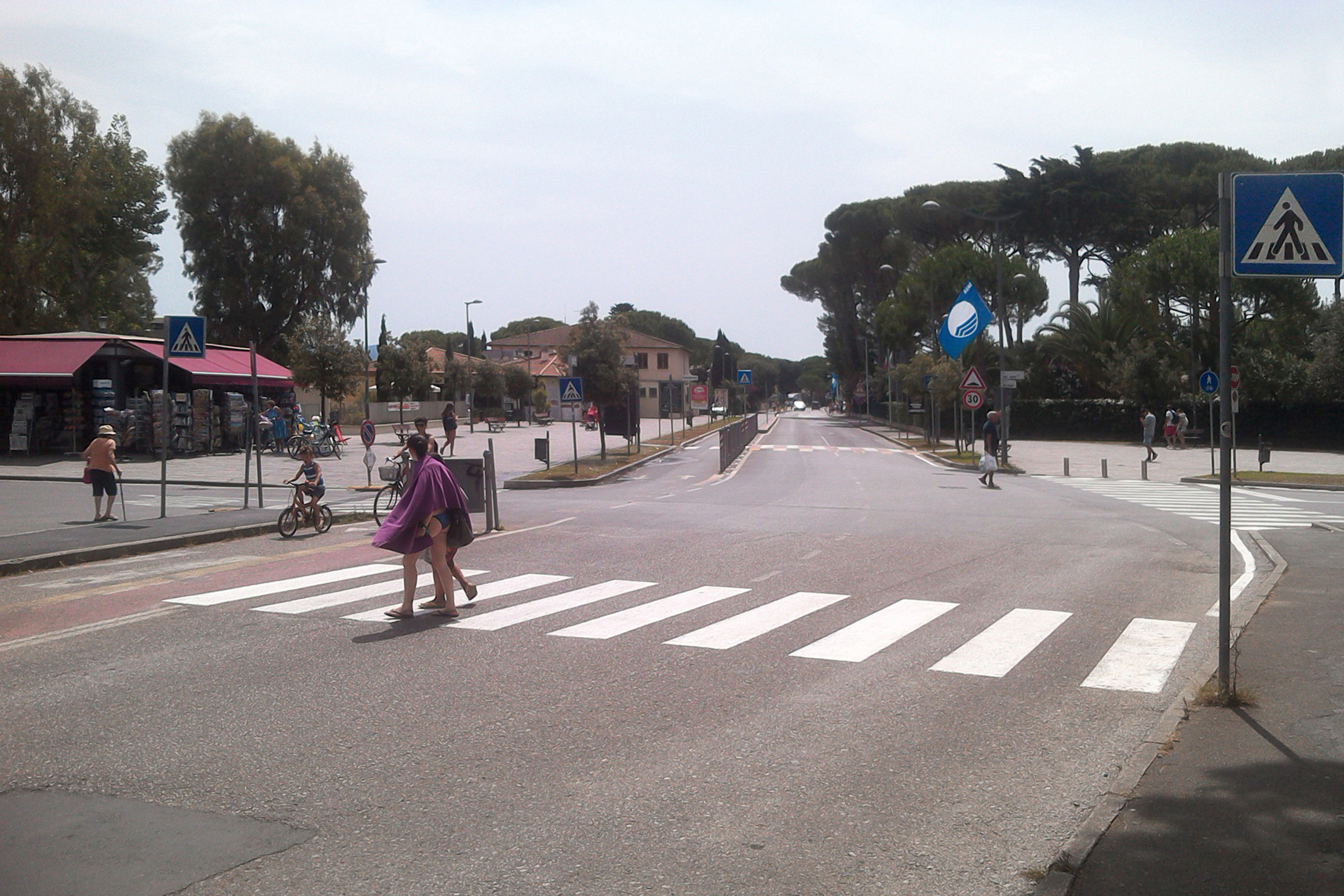
- Streetscape in Marina di Bibbona, in 2016

- Location of Marina di Bibbona in Italy
- Coordinates: 43°14′41″N 10°31′59″E
- Country: Italy
- Region: Tuscany
- Province: Livorno (LI)
- Comune: Bibbona
- Elevation: 1 m (3.3 ft)

Population (2011)
  - Total: 192
- Time zone: UTC+1 (CET)
  - Summer (DST): UTC+2 (CEST)
- Postal code: 57020
- Dialing code: (+39) 0586

Marina di Bibbona is a coastal town, a frazione of the municipality of Bibbona, in Tuscany, Italy.

Marina di Bibbona is situated on the Tuscan Riviera, also known as the Costa degli Etruschi, on the coast of the Tyrrhenian Sea.

== Attractions ==
The town has developed next to the Fort of Bibbona, a defensive tower built by the Grand Duchy of Tuscany in the second part of the 18th century.

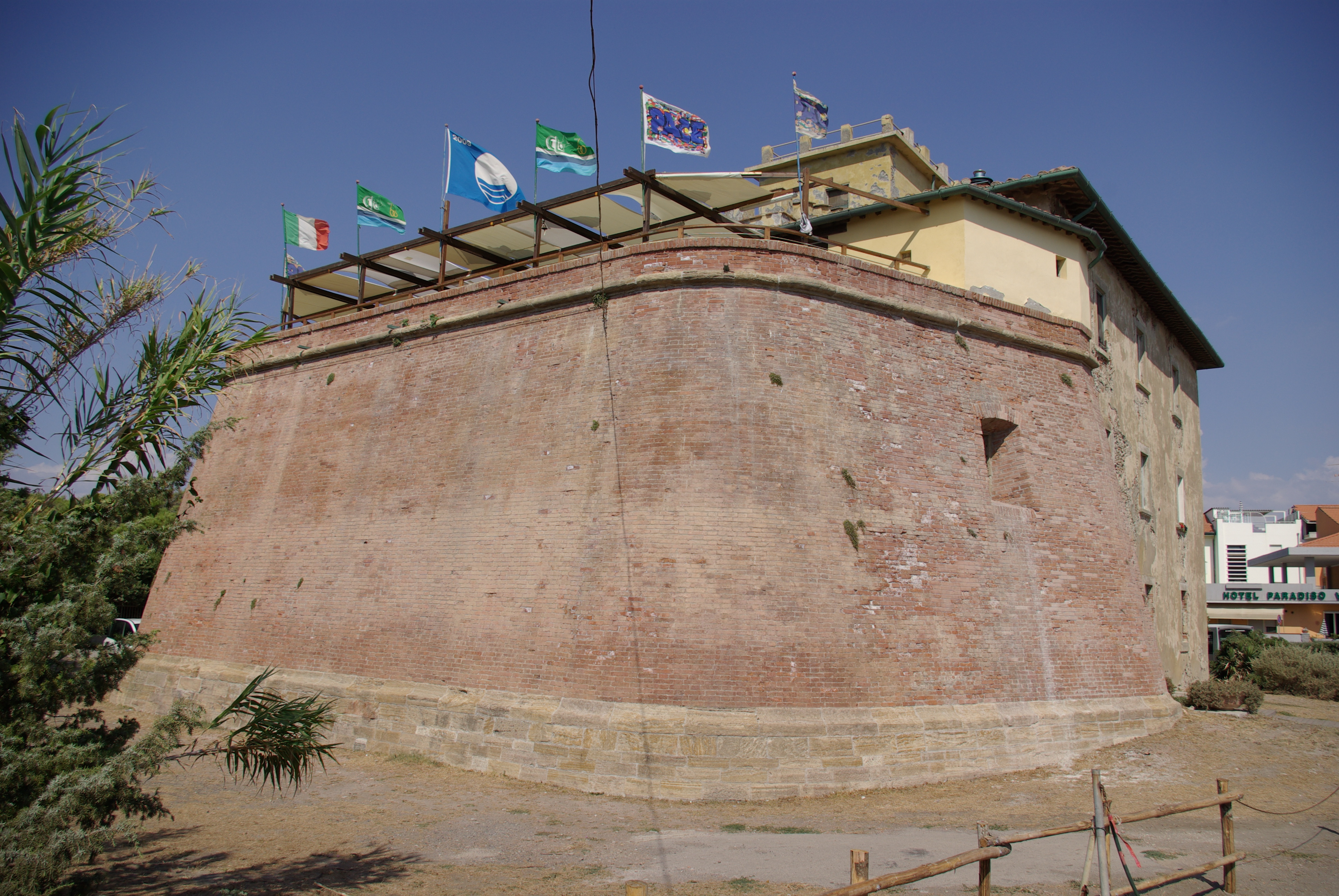
Forte di Marina di Bibbona (Fort of Bibbona)

From the 1980s there has been a high construction growth, especially for summer houses and residences for tourists. The beaches have contributed to make the town a prominent holiday resort.

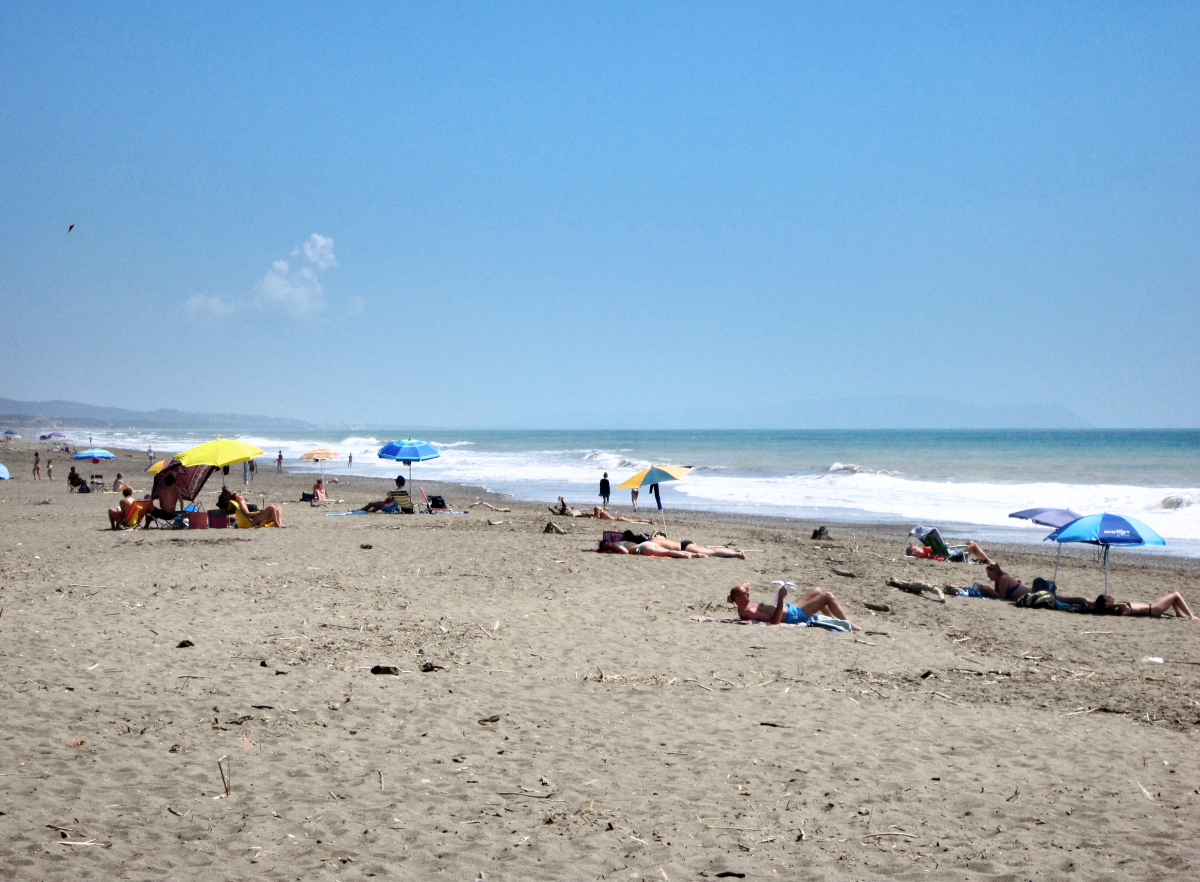
Beach in Marina di Bibbona, Tuscany, Italy (2013)

Michelin Guide lists nine restaurants in Marina Di Bibbona, one of which has a "1 star" rating as of 2026.

In the frazione, there is a post-World-War-Two Roman Catholic Church, Chiesa di Cristo Nostra Pace (Church of Christ Our Peace), and Chiesa Di Nostra Signora di Fatima (Church of Our Lady of Fatima) in the adjacent frazione La California, both of interest to pilgrims and architecture buffs.

The closest "regional" (local) train station is Bolgheri railway station, while the closest express train station is Cecina railway station; they are connected by regional trains to Livorno railway station.
