= Marina di Castagneto Carducci =

- Frazione
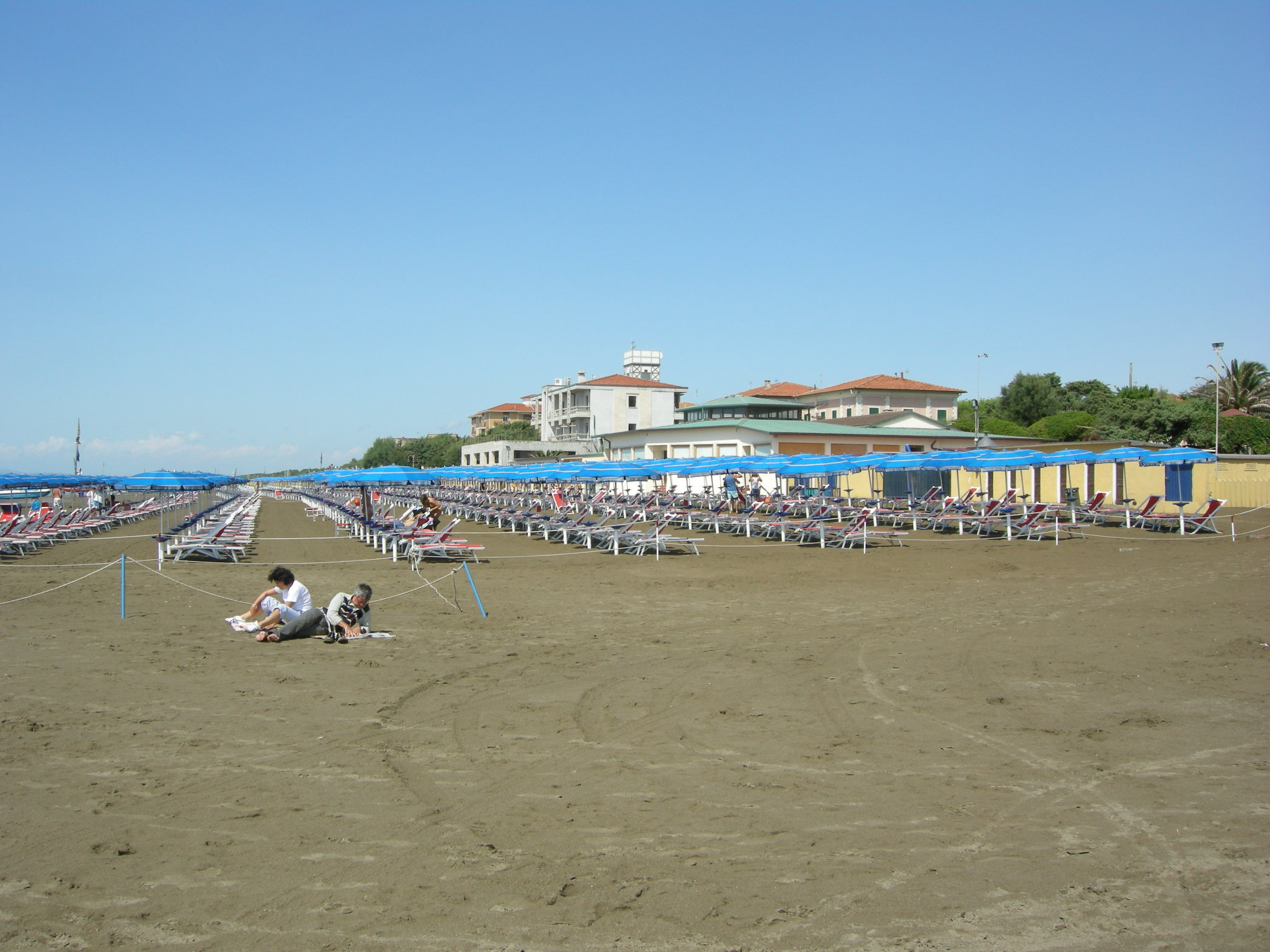
- The beach

- Location of Marina di Castagneto Carducci in Italy
- Coordinates: 43°10′39″N 10°32′20″E
- Country: Italy
- Region: Tuscany
- Province: Livorno (LI)
- Comune: Castagneto Carducci
- Elevation: 6 m (20 ft)

Population (2011)
  - Total: 95
- Time zone: UTC+1 (CET)
  - Summer (DST): UTC+2 (CEST)
- Postal code: 57022
- Dialing code: (+39) 0565

Marina di Castagneto Carducci is a village in Tuscany, central Italy, administratively a frazione of the comune of Castagneto Carducci, province of Livorno. At the time of the 2011 census its population was 95.

The village is about 50 km from Livorno and 7 km from Castagneto Carducci.

The amusement park Cavallino Matto is located in Marina di Castagneto Carducci.

== Main sights ==
- Fort of Marina di Castagneto (18th century)

== Bibliography ==
- R. Manetti (1991). Torri costiere del litorale toscano: loro territorio e antico ruolo di vigilanza costiera.
