= La California =

- Frazione
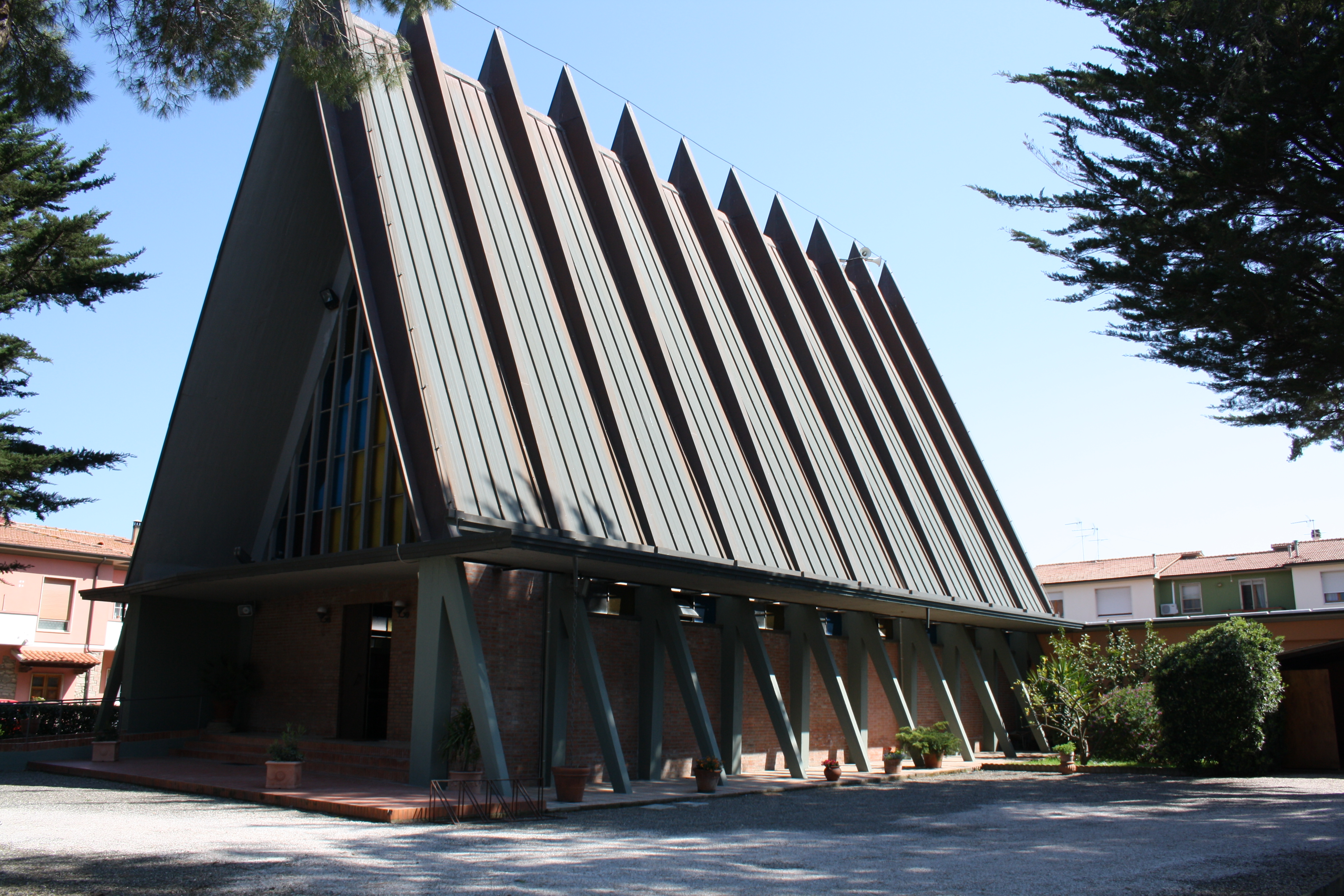
- The church of Nostra Signora di Fatima

- Location of La California in Italy
- Coordinates: 43°16′10″N 10°32′34″E
- Country: Italy
- Region: Tuscany
- Province: Livorno (LI)
- Comune: Bibbona
- Elevation: 9 m (30 ft)

Population (2011)
  - Total: 1,090
- Time zone: UTC+1 (CET)
  - Summer (DST): UTC+2 (CEST)
- Postal code: 57020
- Dialing code: (+39) 0586

La California is a town in Tuscany, central Italy, administratively a frazione of the comune of Bibbona, province of Livorno. At the time of the 2011 census its population was 1,090.

The town is about 40 km (25 miles) from Livorno and 6 km (3.5 miles) from Bibbona.

== History ==
The town developed starting from 19th century, but it has been inhabited since before: around the locality of Crocino, an Etruscan tomb from 6th century BC has been discovered.

The name of the town comes from the story of Leonetto Cipriani, who traveled from the Mediterranean sea to California, back and forth, and gave this name to the town.

Since 2004, and every 4 years, inhabitants of La California hold mock elections coinciding with the presidential elections of the United States of America. The vote is not taken into account in the official results, but it is sent to the nearest United States consulate in Florence.

== Sport ==
La California is the birthplace of cyclist Paolo Bettini, who won two world championships and a gold medal at the Olympics.

== Bibliography ==
- Mordhorst, Susanne (1996). Guida alla Val di Cecina (in Italian). Siena: Nuova Immagine. ISBN 88-7145-120-1.
