= Bolgheri Castle =

Castle in Tuscany, Italy

- Castello di Bolgheri
- Bolgheri, Tuscany, Italy
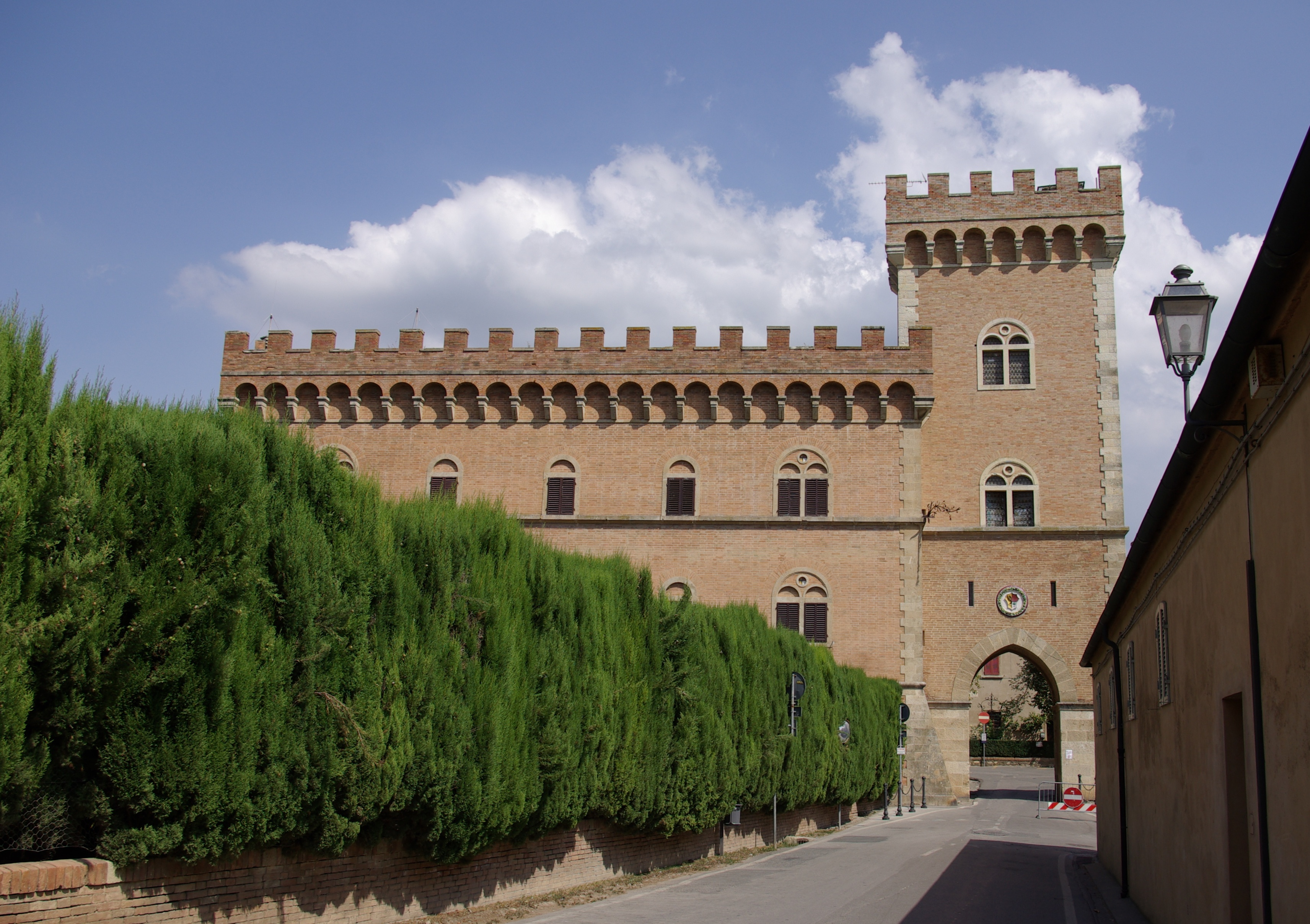
- Bolgheri Castle in 2009

Site information
- Type: Castle

Location
- Coordinates: 43°14′02.49″N 10°37′01.38″E

Bolgheri Castle (Italian: Castello di Bolgheri) is a castle located in Bolgheri, Tuscany, Italy.

== History ==
The castle, of medieval origin, has belonged to the Della Gherardesca family since the 13th century. From the 18th century onward, the building underwent major renovations, including the construction of the cellars. Later, in 1895, the façade was redesigned according to a project by Tito Bellini, who added the crenellated tower at the entrance to the village of Bolgheri.

== Description ==
The castle consists of several structures that extend around the original core of the village of Bolgheri.

The most striking element is the tower, with a rectangular plan, characterized by a pointed arch that serves as the entrance to the village; above it is the coat of arms of the Della Gherardesca family, while higher up there are two mullioned windows.
