= Modern Rome: From Napoleon to the Twenty-First Century =

- Italian 2011 edition
- Editors: Lucia Bozzola, Roberto Einaudi, Marco Zumaglini, Paolo Berdini (contributor) and Vezio De Lucia (contributor)
- Author: Italo Insolera and Paolo Berdini (collaborator)
- Original title: Roma moderna. Da Napoleone I al XXI secolo
- Translator: Lucia Bozzola, Roberto Einaudi and Marco Zumaglini
- Language: Italian
- Subject: Urban History
- Set in: Rome, 19th to 21st centuries
- Publisher: Giulio Einaudi Editore; Cambridge Scholars Publishing
- Publication date: 2011
- Publication place: Italy
- English publication date: December 2018
- Pages: 508
- ISBN: 978-1-5275-1664-9

Modern Rome: From Napoleon to the Twenty-First Century is the first English edition of Italo Insolera’s classic historical urban study Roma moderna. Da Napoleone I al XXI secolo published in 2011 as the last of several editions, revisions and updates issued starting from 1962.

Insolera locates the birth of "modern" Rome in 1811, when Napoleon I signed what he considers the first modern laws in Rome’s history, and extends his analysis of Rome’s urban development up to 2011. The book covers, among others, the last years of papal government and the subsequent establishment of Rome as the national capital of the newly unified Italy, the—contradictory, in Insolera's opinion—architectural achievements of the late 19th century, the difficult years post-WWI, the urban policy of the Fascist period, regarded as absurd by Insolera, the cultural revival and optimism following WWII, and what Insolera views as the alarming and still relevant developments of the late decades of the 20th century.

With this scope, the book reconstructs the complex and difficult history of a city that endlessly seeks—and never seems to find according to Insolera—a planned definition of its own urban aspect.

In addition to a Preface and a "Presentation to the Anglo-Saxon Reader," the English edition features two extra chapters. One includes a critical review of Insolera’s Roma moderna, with additional information on a number of key issues in the post-WWII history of Rome (and Italy). it:Vezio De Lucia, a renowned Italian urban planner, provided most of this material. The second chapter refers to the post-2011 urban history of Rome. The main contributor is it:Paolo Berdini, an expert on the Roman suburbs, who collaborated with Insolera on the 2011 edition of the book and was responsible for urban planning in Rome at the start of the municipal government established after the June 2016 elections. A map relating to the city centre and the changes that have occurred there since the early 19th century, additional photos, and an index of places complete the materials designed for the English edition.

Modern Rome has been awarded the ISOCARP Gerd Albers Award 'Best Book' 2019.

== Main editions ==
- Italo Insolera, Roma moderna : un secolo di storia urbanistica (Modern Rome. A Century of Urban History), Piccola Biblioteca Einaudi (Turin: Einaudi, 1962), 279 pages, 20 chapters.
- Italo Insolera and Paolo Berdini (collaborator), Roma moderna. Da Napoleone I al XXI secolo, Piccola Biblioteca Einaudi 550 (Turin: Einaudi, 2011), 403 pages, 30 chapters, ISBN 978-88-06-20876-9.
- Italo Insolera, Paolo Berdini (collaborator & contributor) and Vezio De Lucia (contributor), Modern Rome: From Napoleon to the Twenty-First Century, eds. Lucia Bozzola, Roberto Einaudi and Marco Zumaglini (Newcastle upon Tyne: Cambridge Scholars Publishing, 2021), 508 pages, Paperback binding, ISBN 978-1-5275-4795-7.
