= Tenuta San Guido =

Italian wine producer

Coordinates: 43.2064201°N 10.5538829°E

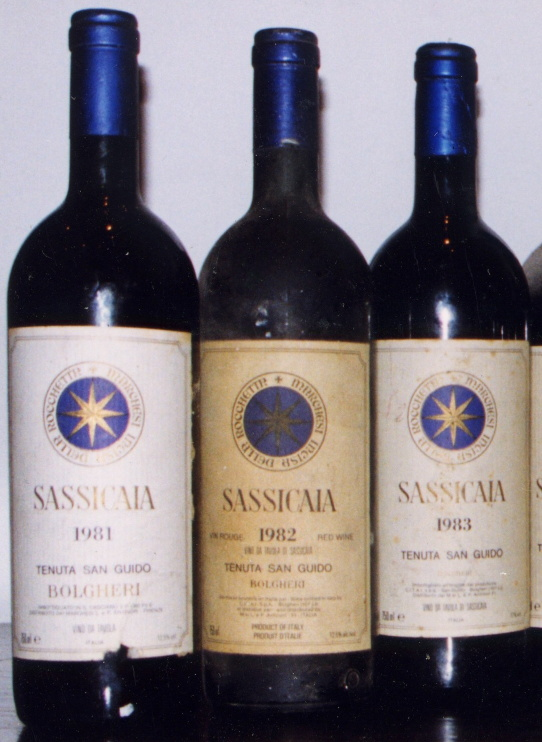
Early 80s vintages of Sassicaia

Tenuta San Guido is an Italian wine producer in the DOC Bolgheri in Toscana, known as a producer of "Super Tuscan" wine. It produces Sassicaia, a Bordeaux-style red wine. The estate also produces a second wine, Guidalberto, and a third wine, Le Difese. Tenuta San Guido is member of the Primum Familiae Vini.

== History ==
Tenuta San Guido was established by marchese Mario Incisa della Rocchetta, who was also co-owner of the race horse Ribot. Considered the seminal "Super Tuscan", the name Sassicaia (Italian sasso meaning "stone", indicating a stony field) originated in 1948 when first produced by Incisa della Rocchetta using Cabernet Sauvignon vines and for years only used for family consumption. A story about these vines being sourced from Château Lafite-Rothschild was dismissed by Mario's son, Nicolò Incisa della Rocchetta, as the vineyard was planted from "cuttings from 50-year-old vines from a friend's estate near Pisa".

Though for years Sassicaia remained the marchese's personal wine, his son Nicolò and nephew Piero Antinori convinced him to release it commercially, starting with the 1968 vintage, which was unveiled in 1971. Initially, there were only a few thousand bottles available, but those created a demand for more. Mario Incisa della Rocchetta hired consulting enologist Giacomo Tachis to further refine the wine while increasing production.

At a 1978 Decanter tasting of "great clarets", a panel including Hugh Johnson, Serena Sutcliffe and Clive Coates awarded the 1972 Sassicaia first place over a field of 33 wines from 11 countries.

In 1994 Sassicaia was granted its own DOC (Bolgheri Sassicaia DOC), the only wine from a single estate in Italy to enjoy this privilege. Before that, and in similarity to other wines made outside the traditional DOC/DOCG regulations, Sassicaia was classified as an Indicazione geografica tipica (IGT). Initially it was a Vino da tavola.

== Production ==
Tenuta San Guido cultivates fruit from several plots around Bolgheri, extending 75 hectares (190 acres), with a grape variety distribution of 85% Cabernet Sauvignon and 15% Cabernet Franc. The annual production is approximately 180,000 bottles.

The second wine, Guidalberto, was introduced in 2000. Its first vintage was composed of 40% Cabernet Sauvignon, 40% Merlot and 20% Sangiovese. Newer vintages do not contain any Sangiovese. The wine has an annual production of 150,000 bottles.

The most recently added wine, Le Difese, is composed of 70% Cabernet Sauvignon and 30% Sangiovese, with an annual production of 120,000 bottles.
