= Sassetta, Tuscany =

Sassetta
- Comune
- Comune di Sassetta
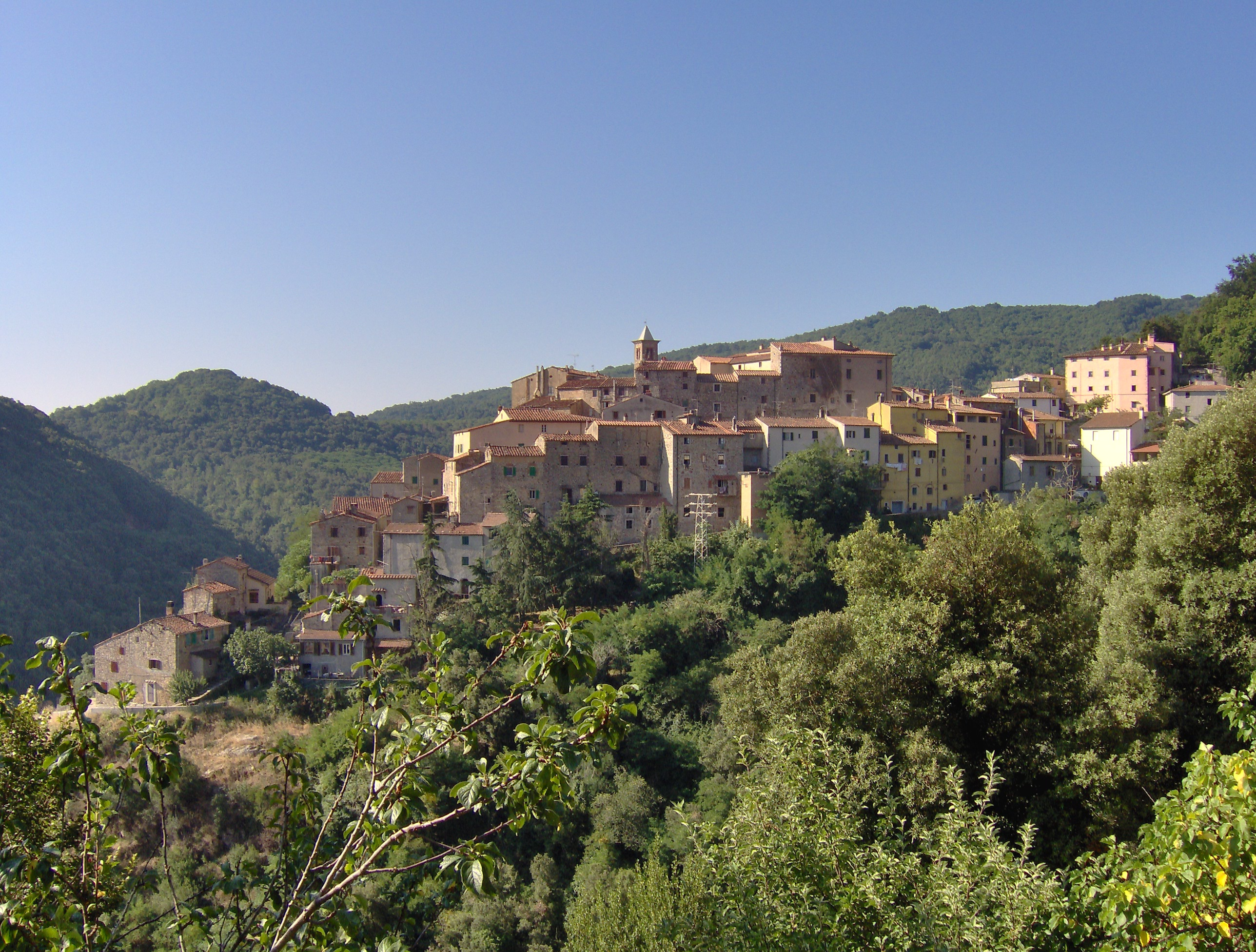

- Location within Italy Location within Tuscany
- Coordinates: 43°8′N 10°39′E
- Country: Italy
- Region: Tuscany
- Province: Livorno (LI)

Government
  - Mayor: Alessandro Guarguaglini

Area
  - Total: 26.6 km^{2} (10.3 sq mi)
- Elevation: 330 m (1,080 ft)

Population (January 2017)
  - Total: 503
  - Density: 18.9/km^{2} (49.0/sq mi)
- Demonym: Sassetani
- Time zone: UTC+1 (CET)
  - Summer (DST): UTC+2 (CEST)
- Postal code: 57020
- Dialing code: 0565
- Patron saint: S. Rocco
- Saint day: 16 August
- Website: Official website

Sassetta is a comune (municipality) in the Province of Livorno in the Italian region Tuscany, located about 90 kilometres (56 miles) southwest of Florence and about 50 kilometres (31 mi) southeast of Livorno.

Sassetta borders the following municipalities: Castagneto Carducci, Monteverdi Marittimo, Suvereto.

== History ==
Sassetta was an important castle of the Pisan Republic, demolished in 1503, after the Florentine conquest. In 1516, the original lords of the village, the Pisans Orlandi della Sassetta, were also exiled. From the 16th century, the village belonged to the Ramirez de Montalvo family of Spanish origin, who arrived in Florence with the court of Eleonora da Toledo who married the Grand Duke of Tuscany Cosimo I de' Medici.
