= Donoratico =

- Frazione
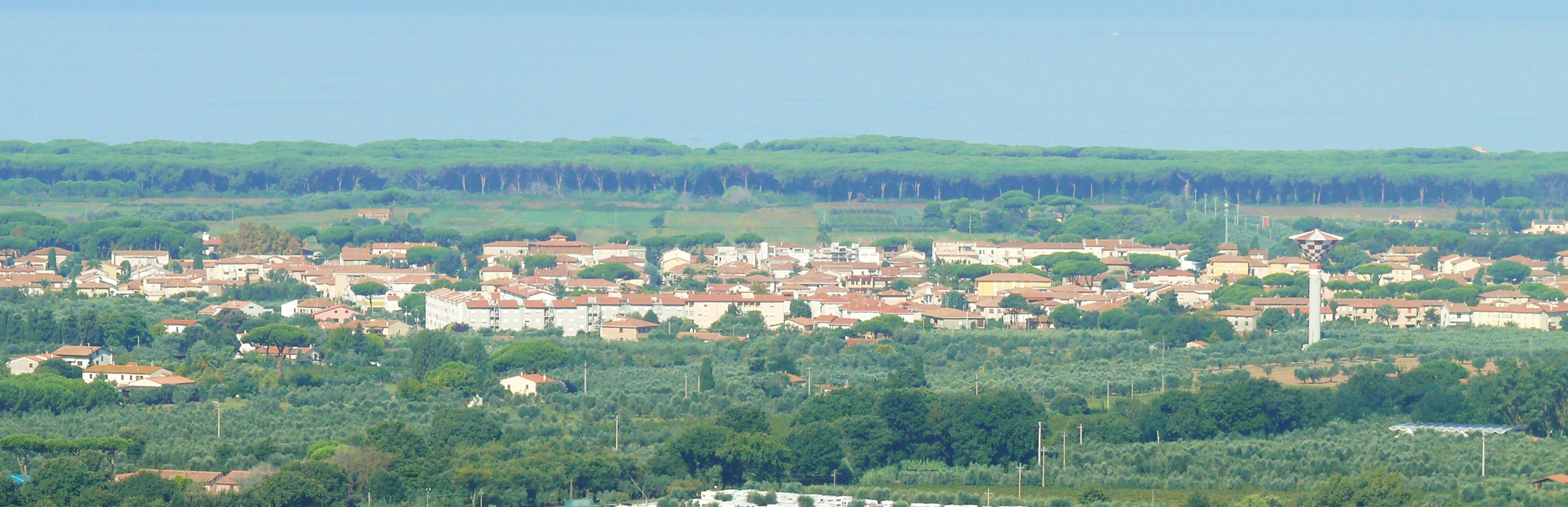
- View of Donoratico

- Location of Donoratico in Italy
- Coordinates: 43°9′59″N 10°33′57″E
- Country: Italy
- Region: Tuscany
- Province: Livorno (LI)
- Comune: Castagneto Carducci
- Elevation: 10 m (33 ft)

Population (2011)
  - Total: 5,046
- Time zone: UTC+1 (CET)
  - Summer (DST): UTC+2 (CEST)
- Postal code: 57022
- Dialing code: (+39) 0565

Donoratico is a town in Tuscany, central Italy, administratively a frazione of the comune of Castagneto Carducci, province of Livorno. At the time of the 2011 census its population was 5,046. The town is about 52 km from Livorno and 4 km from Castagneto Carducci.

== Main sights ==
- Castle of Donoratico (10th century), in ruins

== Bibliography ==
- G. Bianchi (2004). Castello di Donoratico (LI). I risultati delle prime campagne di scavo (2000-2002). Firenze.
