= Bolgheri railway station =

Railway station in Italy

Bolgheri
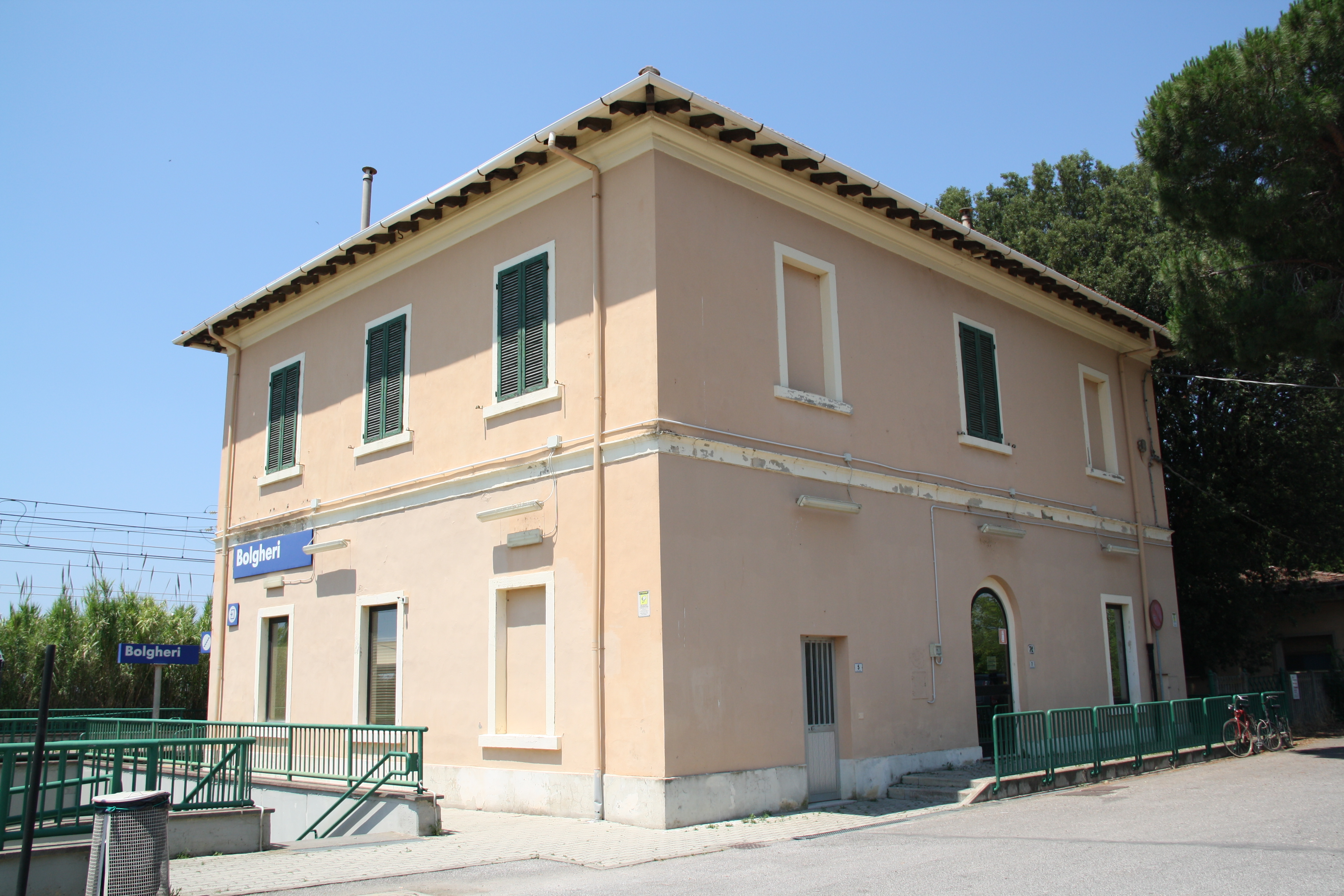

General information
- Location: Via della Stazione; Stazione Bolgheri 57020; Bibbona, Livorno, Tuscany; Italy
- Coordinates: 43°14′40.8″N 10°33′2.7″E
- Operator: Rete Ferroviaria Italiana; Trenitalia
- Line: Tirrenica
- Tracks: 2

Other information
- Classification: Bronze

History
- Opened: 11 September 1900; 125 years ago
Location
- Location within Tuscany Location within Italy

Bolgheri railway station is an Italian railway station on the Tirrenica railway line, located in the municipality of Bibbona, Province of Livorno, Tuscany. It takes its name from the nearby village of Bolgheri.

== History ==
The station opened on 11 September 1900 as a new railway stop on the Pisa–Rome railway between the stations of Bibbona and Castagneto. Initially named "Sorbizzi", it was renamed "Bolgheri" the following year.

== See also ==
- History of rail transport in Italy
- List of railway stations in Tuscany
- Rail transport in Italy
- Railway stations in Italy
