= Antinori =

Italian wine company

Coordinates: 43.6452066°N 11.1332392°E

Marchesi Antinori Srl
- Location: Florence, Tuscany, Italy
- Appellation: Chianti Classico
- Founded: 1385
- First vintage: 1385
- Key people: Marchese Piero Antinori
- Known for: Tignanello, Solaia
- Varietals: Sangiovese, Cabernet sauvignon, Cabernet franc, Merlot, Syrah, Pinot noir, Pinot blanc, Chardonnay, Trebbiano, Gewurztraminer
- Other products: Consorzio Laudemio olive oil, Goat's cheese
- Distribution: International
- Tasting: 4 shops, main one is at Tavarnelle Val di Pesa (www.osteriadipassignano.com)
- Website: http://www.antinori.it/

Marchesi Antinori Srl is an Italian wine company, based in Florence, Tuscany, that can trace its history back to 1385. They are one of the biggest wine companies in Italy, and their innovations played a large part in the "Super-Tuscan" revolution of the 1970s.

Antinori is a member of the Primum Familiae Vini and the 10th oldest family owned company in the world.

== History ==
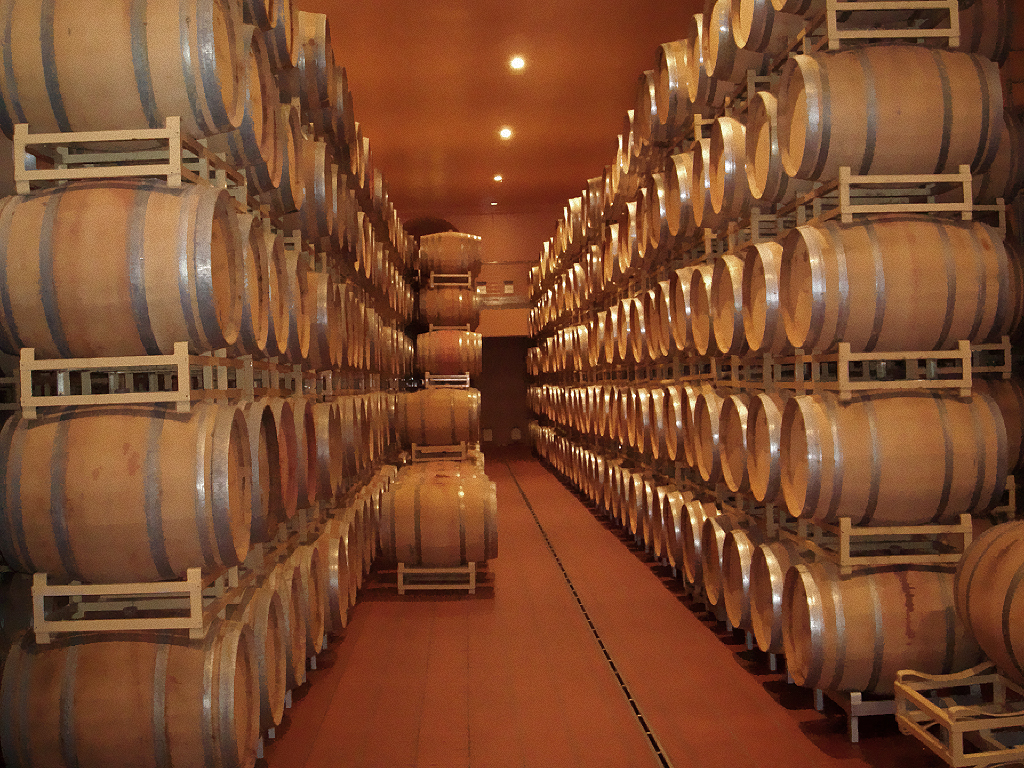
Barrels in the cellars of Antinori at their Guado al Tasso estate

Rinuccio di Antinoro is recorded as making wine at the Castello di Combiate near the Tuscan town of Calenzano in 1180. The castello was destroyed in 1202, and the family moved to Florence, where they were involved in silk weaving and banking. In 1385, Giovanni di Piero Antinori joined the Guild of Winemakers, and this is the date usually taken as the start of the wine business.

The fame of their wine expanded over the years, to the extent that in 1506 they could afford to pay 4,000 florins for the Palazzo Antinori, built for the Boni family in the 1460s. At this time, Alessandro Antinori was one of the richest men in Florence, but like many Florentines he was soon bankrupted by the ravages of Emperor Charles V and the economic effect of his New World gold. Nonetheless the family prospered in the ensuing peace and gained the title of Marquis from the House of Habsburg-Lorraine in the 18th century.

In the second half of the 16th century, Bernardino Antinori had a relationship with Dianora di Toledo, wife of Pietro de' Medici the son of Cosimo I. Pietro, who was known at the time for his brutality and dishonesty, discovered the relationship, accused his wife of adultery and strangled her with a dog leash in July 1576 at the Villa Medici at Cafaggiolo. Bernardino was arrested and later killed in prison. Cosimo I exiled his son Pietro to Spain.

In 1900, Piero Antinori bought several vineyards in the Chianti Classico region, including 47 hectares at Tignanello. His son Niccolò scandalised Tuscany in 1924 by making a Chianti containing Bordeaux wine varieties. He continued to experiment over the following years with new blends, types of barrel, temperature control and bottle ageing. Niccolò retired in 1966, to be replaced by his son Piero who was even more innovative. He investigated early harvesting of white grapes, different types of barrique, stainless steel vats and malolactic fermentation of red wines.

The real revolution came in 1974 with the launch of Tignanello's first vintage, 1971: a barrique-aged wine from the vineyard bearing the same name containing Cabernet Sauvignon and Cabernet Franc. Although the initial blend did not yet contain any Cabernet Sauvignon or Cabernet Franc, no white grape varieties were used, which meant that the wine was ineligible for the Chianti Classico appellation; from the vintage 1975 onwards, the blend contained Cabernet Sauvignon. Technically Tignanello was not the first 'Super Tuscan' – that honour goes to Sassicaia, created by a relative of the Antinoris, the Marquis Mario Incisa della Rocchetta – even though the Antinoris were experimenting with Cabernet blends since the 1920s. But it was Tignanello that really shook up the Italian wine industry, leading to far-reaching changes in rules and attitudes. Although the Chianti Classico DOCG rules have changed to accommodate wines such as Tignanello, the Antinoris continue to sell it as a Toscana IGT wine. Emboldened by the success of the 20% Bordeaux blend Tignanello, in 1978 Antinori launched Solaia - containing 80% Cabernet Sauvignon - from the neighbouring vineyard.

Antinori responded to the inflation of the 1980s and 1990s with a frantic programme of investment in wineries and vineyards, most notably the Atlas Peak winery in California in 1985, and 325 hectares around Badia a Passignano in 1987. They also expanded into Piedmont and Apulia, and set up joint ventures in Bátaapáti, Hungary, Stag's Leap and Col Solare in the USA, Malta, Romania, and Chile. Antinori took complete ownership of Stag's Leap Wine Cellars in 2023 and Col Solare in 2024.

== Vineyards and wines ==
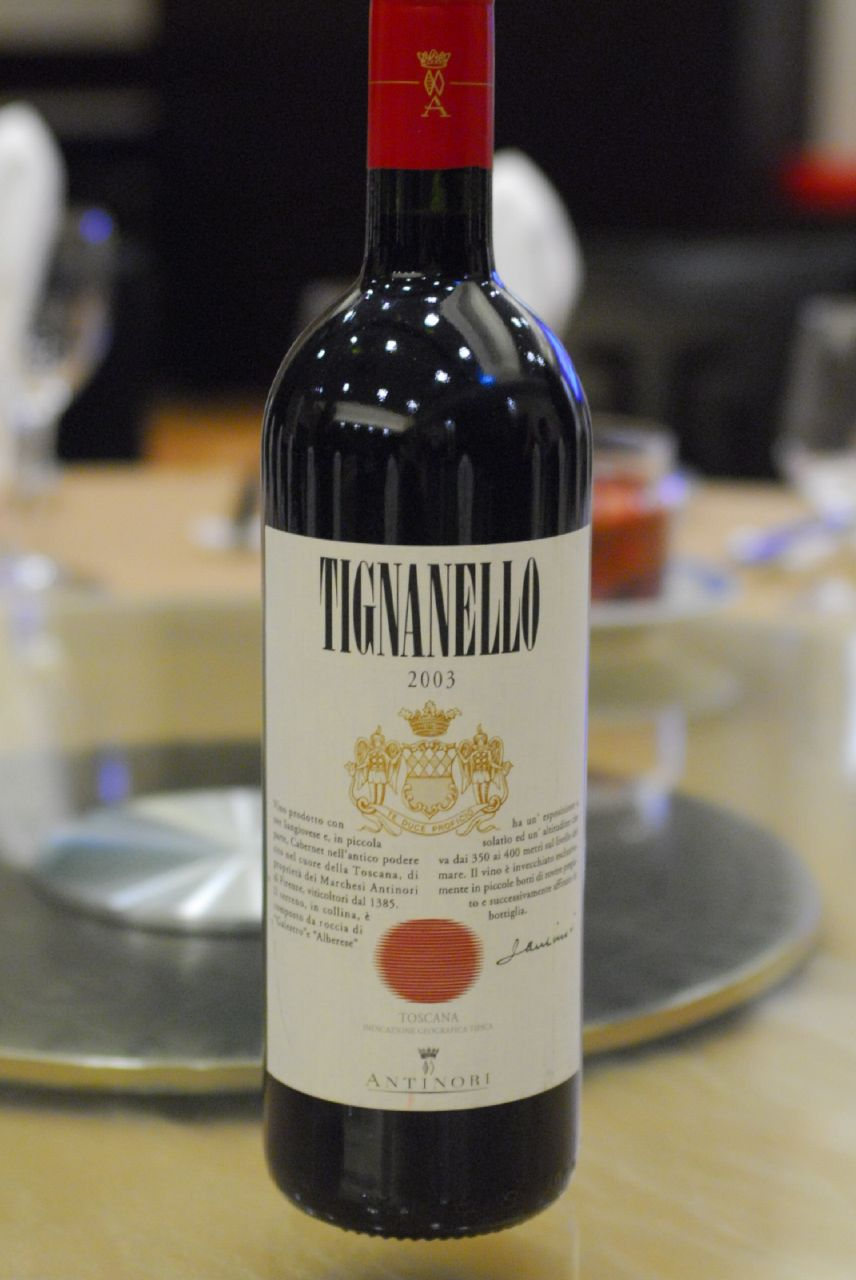
A bottle of 2003 vintage Tignanello

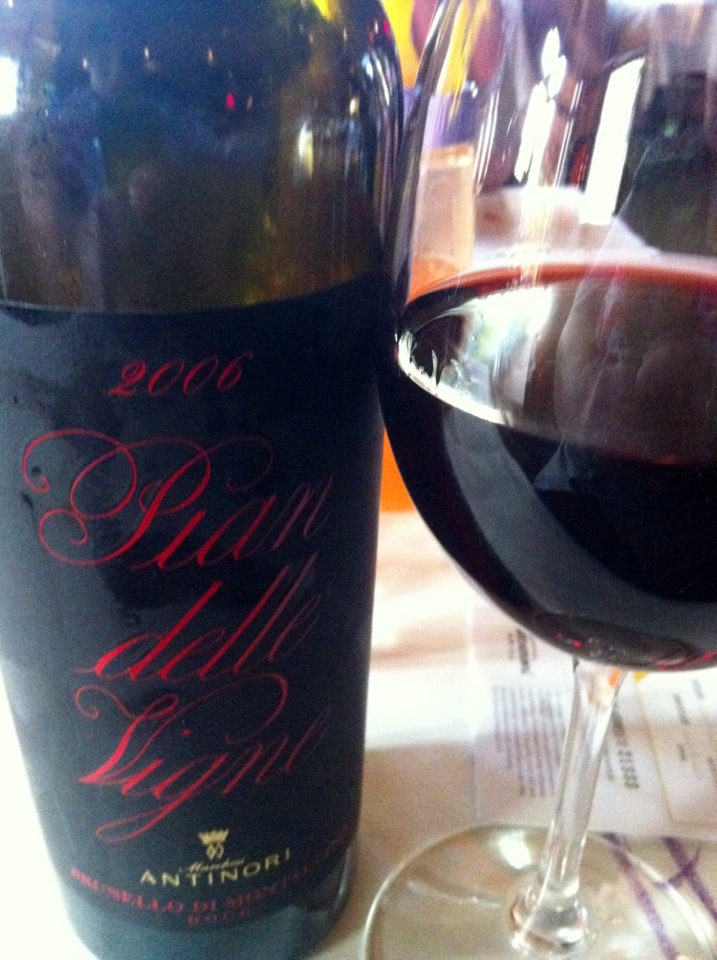
Brunello di Montalcino from Antinori.

- Tignanello - is a 47 hectare vineyard acquired in 1900 and gives its name to Antinori's most famous wine, designated a Vino da Tavola since the mid-1970s and IGT Toscana since the early 1990s. Since 1982, Tignanello has been made from 85% Sangiovese, 10% Cabernet Sauvignon and 5% Cabernet Franc. The vineyard lies at 1150–1312 feet above sea level, within the Santa Cristina estate (also known as Tenuta Tignanello).
- Solaia - 'The sunny one' is a 10 hectare vineyard adjacent to Tignanello in the Mercatale Val di Pesa zone of Chianti Classico. The eponymous wine was released in 1978 as an 80% Cabernet Sauvignon, 20% Cabernet Franc blend, although that has now evolved to a mix of 75% Cabernet Sauvignon, 5% Cabernet Franc, 20% Sangiovese. Like Tignanello, fruit not used for the grand vin goes into Antinori's Chianti Classico Riserva, Tenute del Marchese and the IGT Villa Antinori (60% Sangiovese, 20% Cabernet Sauvignon, 15% Merlot and 5% Syrah).
- Pèppoli Estate - Close to Tignanello, 55ha of the 100ha of the Peppoli estate are planted with vines. The slopes face northeast, but the unique microclimate of the valley produces a fruity Pèppoli Chianti Classico and contributes to Marchese Antinori.
- Badia a Passignano - The Antinoris bought the 325 hectare estate around the historic Vallombrosian abbey in 1987, including the right to use the abbey's cellars. Fifty hectares are planted with Sangiovese from Tignanello which provides the grapes for another Chianti Classico DOCG Riserva, Badia a Passignano. Piero Antinori regards this as his testbed for the ultimate expression of Sangiovese in Tuscany Some grapes go into Marchese Antinori.
- Guado al Tasso - A massive estate of 900 hectares in the Bolgheri bowl, 60 miles SW of Florence, at just 150–200 feet above sea level. A third of it is planted with vines, mostly Sangiovese, Cabernet, Merlot and Syrah, grapes here ripen two weeks before the Chianti holdings. The best known wines are Guado al Tasso, the Scalabrone rose, Il Bruciato and Vermentino. Matarocchio is a lesser-known and rarer expression of 100% Cabernet Franc.
- La Braccesca estate - Vino Nobile di Montepulciano La Braccesca, Vigneto Santa Pia, Sabazio, and the Bramasole and Achelo Syrahs.
- Pian delle Vigne Estate - Sixty hectares of vineyard in a 186 hectare estate bought in 1995, which provides their Brunello di Montalcino.
- Fattoria Aldobrandesca - Aleatico comes from this Etruscan vineyard near Sovana in Southern Tuscany.
- Monteloro Estate - North of Florence, supplies the white wines Villa Antinori Bianco and Capsula Viola.
- Castello della Sala - 500 hectare estate with 160 hectares of vineyard producing Orvieto Classico, Campogrande and Casasole, a Pinot Nero, the Chardonnay-based Cervaro della Sala, and the Sauvignon Blanc-based sweet Muffato della Sala.
- Antica Napa Valley - Antinori's wine estate in Napa, California. Produces Cabernet Sauvignon, Chardonnay, Sangiovese, Sauvignon Blanc, Pinot Noir, and Cabernet Franc on 600 planted acres in Atlas Peak AVA.

== Retail presence ==
Antinori also owns and partners in retail outlets such as Cantinetta Antinori and "Procacci" in Via Tornabuoni in Florence, Italy.

The retail presence even extends to the United States, e.g. at the Pebble Beach resort and retail distribution throughout the United States by Ste. Michelle Wine Estates.

== Media ==
The company and family were featured in a segment of the CBS newsmagazine 60 Minutes reported by Morley Safer on October 12, 2008; the segment was aired again on May 3, 2009, and on May 22, 2016, following Safer's death.

== See also ==
- Italian wine
- History of Chianti
