= Castagneto Carducci =

- Comune
- Comune di Castagneto Carducci
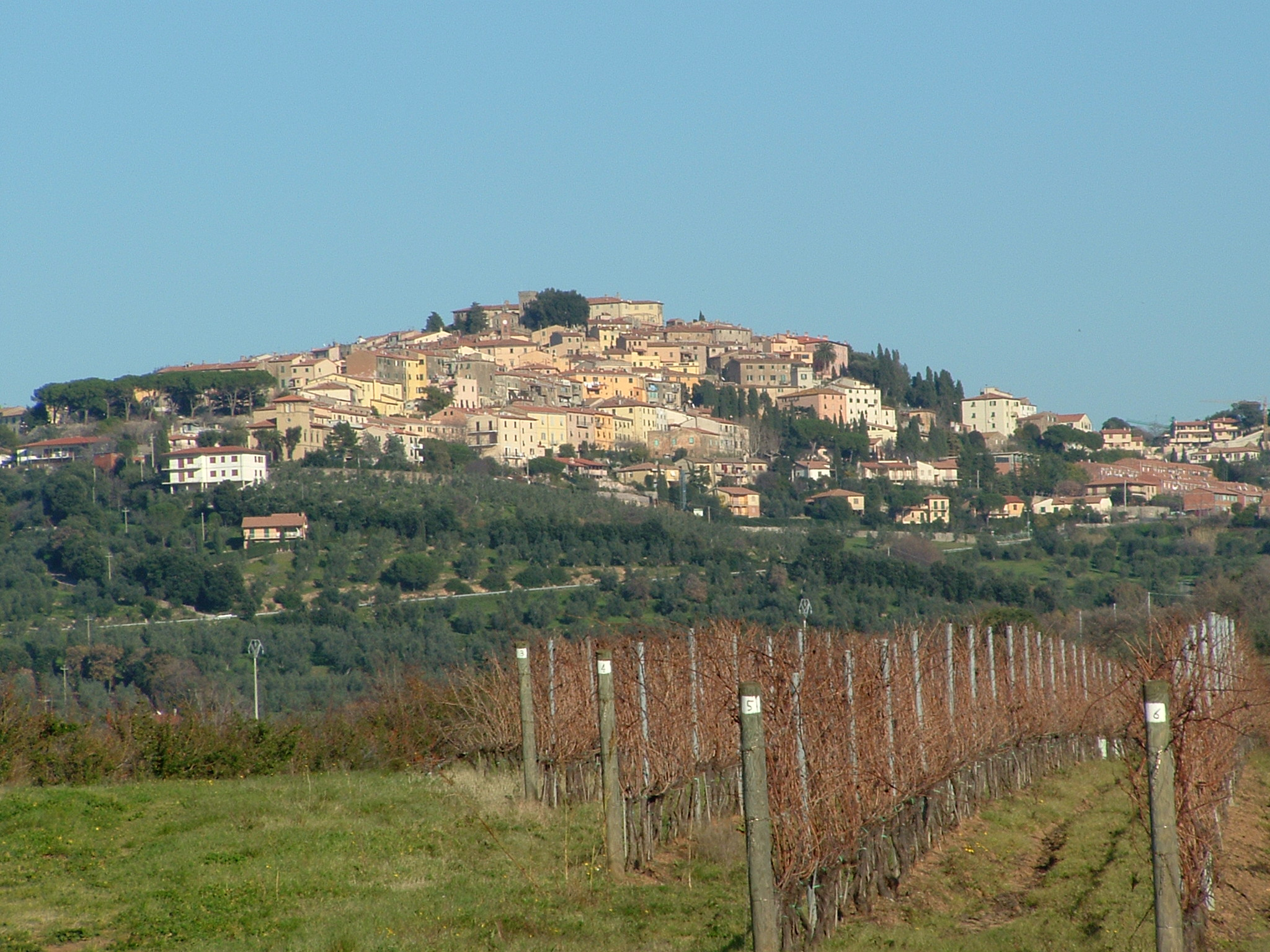
- Panorama of Castagneto Carducci

- Coat of arms

- Location within Italy Location within Tuscany
- Coordinates: 43°10′N 10°36′E
- Country: Italy
- Region: Tuscany
- Province: Livorno (LI)
- Frazioni: Bolgheri, Donoratico, Marina di Castagneto Carducci

Government
  - Mayor: Sandra Scarpellini

Area
  - Total: 142.6 km^{2} (55.1 sq mi)
- Elevation: 194 m (636 ft)

Population (January 2017)
  - Total: 9,071
  - Density: 63.61/km^{2} (164.8/sq mi)
- Demonym: Castagnetani
- Time zone: UTC+1 (CET)
  - Summer (DST): UTC+2 (CEST)
- Postal code: 57022
- Dialing code: 0565
- Patron saint: St. Lawrence
- Saint day: 10 August
- Website: Official website

Castagneto Carducci (Italian pronunciation: [kastaɲˈɲeːto karˈduttʃi]) is a comune (municipality) in the Province of Livorno in the Italian region of Tuscany, located about 90 kilometres (56 miles) southwest of Florence and about 50 km (31 mi) southeast of Livorno. It is named after the poet Giosuè Carducci, who spent some years there as a child.

Castagneto Carducci borders the following municipalities: Bibbona, Monteverdi Marittimo, San Vincenzo, Sassetta, Suvereto.

== Toponymy ==
Castagneto (Italian for 'chestnut grove') comes from castagno (Italian for 'chestnut tree'). In 1900, the specification Marittimo ('on the sea') was added, which in 1907 was changed to the present one, in honour of the famous poet Giosuè Carducci who, as a child, lived there for some years (near Bolgheri, in the north of the village).

== Economy ==
Castagneto Carducci's economy is linked to agriculture and seaside and wine and food tourism, which, especially in summer, benefits from the area's numerous accommodation facilities, which have been awarded the prestigious "Bandiera Blue" cognition. Another important resource is the production of fine wines, which have made the wine cellars of Bolgheri and the surrounding area famous throughout the world. The production of extra virgin olive oil is also important.

== Culture ==
The Museum-Archive, currently home to the Giosuè Carducci Literary Park, preserves material on the life and works of the poet Giosuè Carducci acquired during the Carducci celebrations in 1982 and 1985. The Literary Park is characterised by various interesting itineraries that retrace places and landscapes of the Castagneto area present in Carducci's works and life.

Along the beach is the former Villa Margherita a Marina or sulla spiaggia, built by Walfredo, Count della Gherardesca, and Count of the Donoratico and Castagneto (1865 – 1932) for his wife, Donna Margherita dei Principi Emanuele Ruspoli. Of note is also the former family's adjacent chapel or small church, built 1922-1923 to designs of the architect Luigi Caldini.
