= Bibbona =

- Comune
- Comune di Bibbona
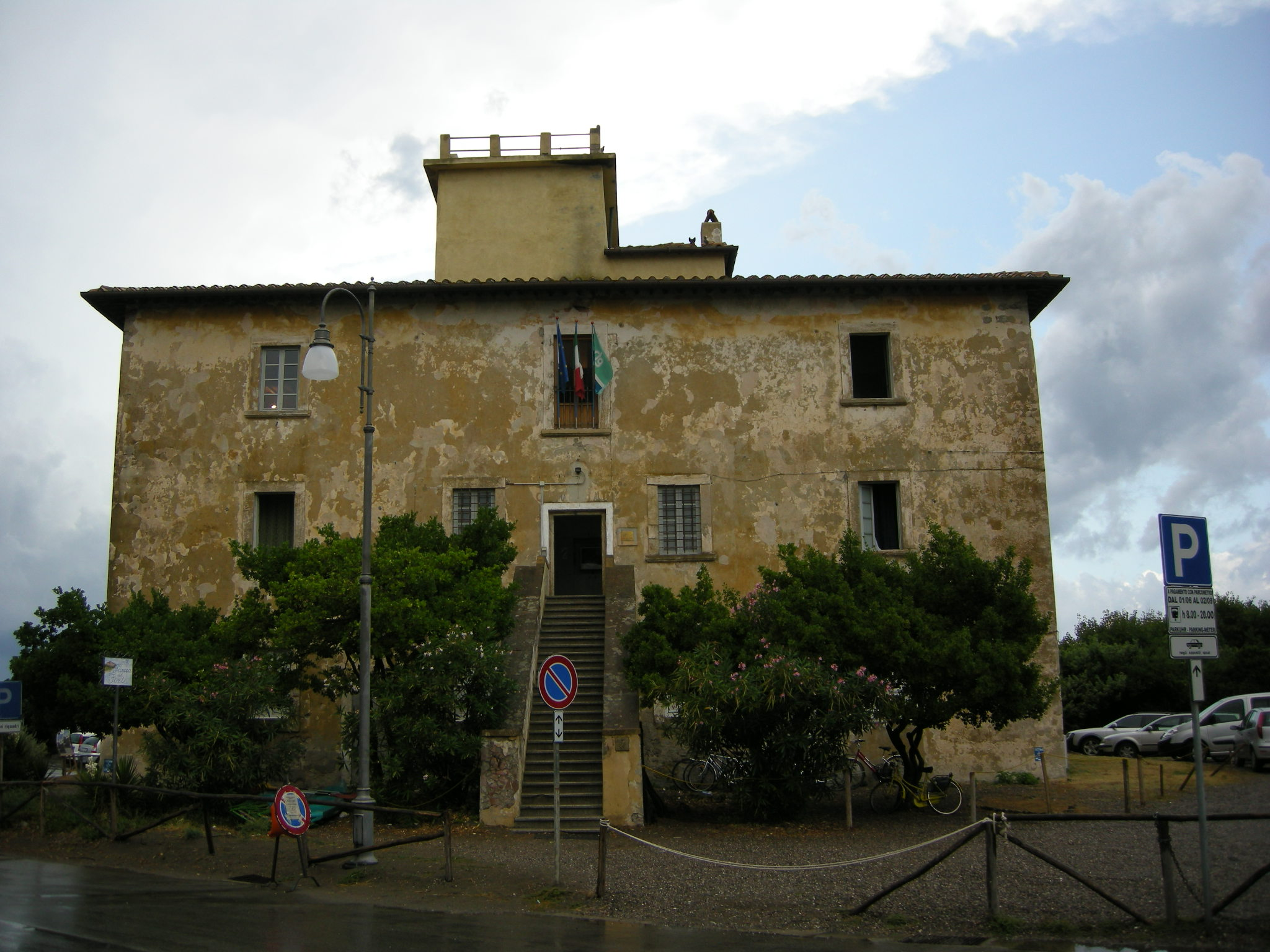
- Fort of Bibbona

- Coat of arms

- Location within Italy Location within Tuscany
- Coordinates: 43°16′N 10°36′E
- Country: Italy
- Region: Tuscany
- Province: Livorno (LI)
- Frazioni: La California, Marina di Bibbona

Government
  - Mayor: Massimo Fedeli

Area
  - Total: 65.6 km^{2} (25.3 sq mi)
- Elevation: 80 m (260 ft)

Population (February 2017)
  - Total: 3,191
  - Density: 48.6/km^{2} (126/sq mi)
- Demonym: Bibbonesi
- Time zone: UTC+1 (CET)
  - Summer (DST): UTC+2 (CEST)
- Postal code: 57020
- Dialing code: 0586
- Patron saint: St. Bartholomew
- Saint day: January 13
- Website: Official website

Bibbona is a comune (municipality) in the Province of Livorno in the Italian region Tuscany, located about 80 kilometres (50 mi) southwest of Florence and about 40 kilometres (25 mi) southeast of Livorno in the Val di Cecina.

== History ==
The town's hilly location allowed for natural defenses, and strong fortifications are known to have existed by the early middle ages. The area is known to have been settled earlier during the Etruscan period based on tombs and archeological finds, and settlement continued into the Roman period.

In the early middle ages, the town and fortifications were in the possession of the Gherardesca family, and their holdings were confirmed by Pope Innocent III in the 12th century. Thereafter, ownership transferred to the free towns of Volterra, Pisa, and eventually Florence.

In Bibbona the sculptor (Riccardo) Richard Aurili born in 1864.

== Main sights ==
- Romanesque Pieve di Sant'Ilario (founded in the 11th century).
- Palazzo del Comune Vecchio, also medieval.
- Fort of Bibbone, built by the Grand Dukes of Tuscany in the 18th century.

== Transports ==
- Bolgheri railway station
