= Romito =

Romito may refer to:

- Romito Cave, a natural limestone cave in the Lao Valley of Pollino National Park, Calabria, Italy
- Il Romito, a village of the comune of Pontedera, Province of Pisa, Tuscany, Italy
- Felipe Romito (1893-1962), Argentine singer
- Tommaso Romito (born 1982), Italian footballer

== See also ==
- Romiti, a surname
