= Piaggio Fly =

Scooter produced by Piaggio

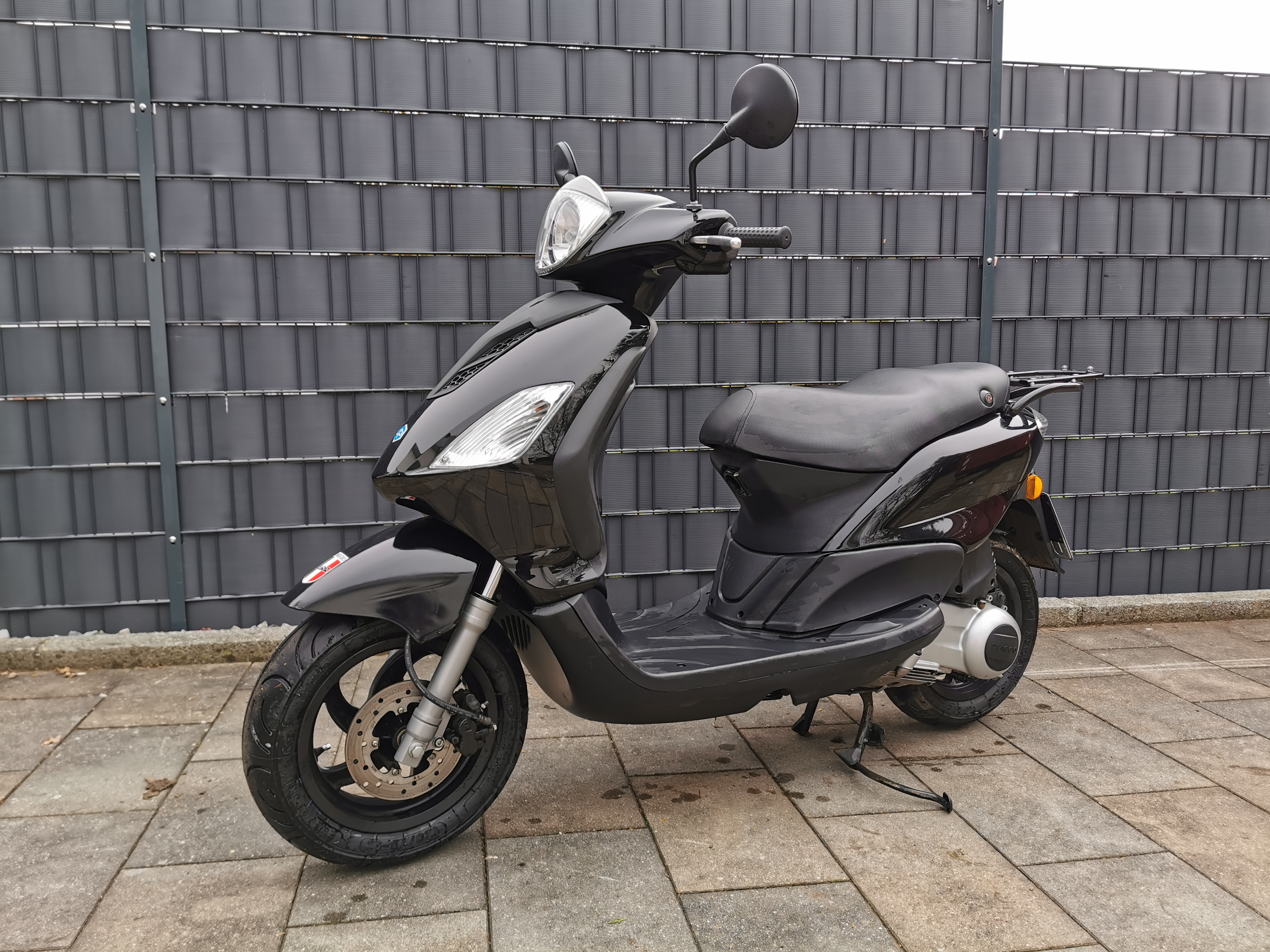
- 2009 Piaggio Fly 125
- Manufacturer: Piaggio
- Also called: Piaggio City Fly; Derbi Boulevard
- Production: 2004–2017; 2005-present (China)
- Assembly: Pontedera, Italy; Foshan, China; Vĩnh Phúc, Vietnam
- Predecessor: Piaggio Sfera
- Class: Scooter
- Engine: 50 cc (3.1 cu in); 100 cc (6.1 cu in); 125 cc (7.6 cu in); 150 cc (9.2 cu in)
- Ignition type: Capacitor discharge electronic ignition (CDI)
- Transmission: CVT automatic; gear final drive
- Frame type: Tubular steel spine
- Brakes: Front; disc Rear; expanding drum

The Piaggio Fly is a scooter produced by italian motorcycle manufacturer Piaggio from 2004 to 2017 to replace the Sfera and Skipper models.

It was also sold by the Spanish company Derbi (controlled by the Piaggio Group) under the name Derbi Boulevard.

In the Chinese market it was introduced in 2005 and is currently in production renamed Piaggio City Fly equipped with a 150 four-stroke Piaggio Leader engine.

== First series (2004–2012) ==
Launched on the market in November 2004, the Fly is a compact low-wheeled scooter developed by Piaggio to be sold globally: production takes place in the Pontedera plants for the European and North American market, while the following year the production in China at the Zongshen-Piaggio Foshan plant to be sold on the Asian market.

Extremely compact, it has a length of 1870 mm and is positioned in terms of prices between the small Zip and the larger Beverly.

Aesthetically it has a style inspired by the Zip but with the large light on the handlebar and the arrows taken from the Beverly. It has a 795 mm high saddle from the ground and 12” wheels with a large compartment under the saddle. The frame is of the single cradle type in steel with a 32 mm diameter fork, at the rear there is a single shock absorber with spring preload adjustment on four positions. The braking system consists of a 200 mm front disc with two-piston caliper and a 140 mm rear drum.

At its debut it was available in four displacements, 50, 100, 125 and 150 cm^{3}, all homologated Euro 2: the 50 was available both with two-stroke Hi-PER2 air-cooled and equipped with a two-stage catalytic converter with Secondary Air System (SAS), both with four-stroke Hi-PER4, the 125 and 150 were fitted with the Piaggio Leader four-stroke engine.

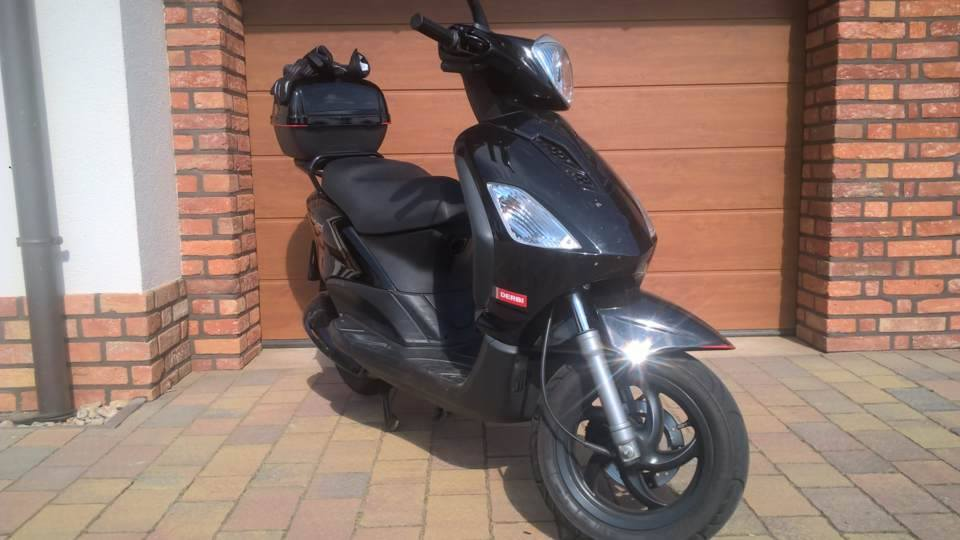
The twin Derbi Boulevard

In April 2006 the whole range was re-homologated Euro 3 and the 100 cm^{3} four-stroke engine with forced air cooling also entered in production.

Since 2009 it has also been marketed by the Spanish company Derbi renamed Derbi Boulevard; this version is aesthetically the same as the Fly and the only differences are concentrated in the front shield with the air intake in raw plastic instead of painted and in the specific color range. The engine range of the Boulevard consists of the 50 cm^{3} two-stroke air-cooled and 125 cm^{3} four-stroke air-cooled engine.

Also in 2009 the Fly with 100 engine went out of production due to low requests. In Asia, the Fly proves to be a great success and Piaggio also starts production in Vietnam at the Vinh Phuc plant to meet demand.

The production of the first series ends in 2012 both in Italy and in Vietnam while in China it will continue to be produced at the Zongshen Piaggio Foshan Motorcycle Co. Ltd joint venture in the 150 version (chassis code BYQ150T-3V). In November 2019 it underwent a slight aesthetic update and the name was changed to Piaggio City Fly.

== Second series (2012–2017) ==
The second series debuted in March 2012 and presents a totally renewed style with a more streamlined and aerodynamic design, new headlights and a new grille that recalls the contemporary Liberty and Beverly models in style. In addition to the Italian production, the renewed Fly is also produced in Vietnam in the Vinh Phuc plant for the South East Asian markets where the first series was produced since 2009.

The frame has been redesigned, it always has the single cradle layout with hydraulic telescopic fork with 32 mm stems and at the rear there is the motor that acts as a swingarm, but the tank has been repositioned under the footboard to offer a wider and more usable compartment under the saddle. which can accommodate 2 demi-jet helmets with visors. The saddle is 760 mm high from the ground. The wheels are 12”. The braking system remains the same as in the first series.

At its debut, the only engine available in Europe is the 50 four-stroke and four-valve which delivers 3.2 kW at 8250 rpm. The following year the three-valve 125 engine was also introduced in Europe. In Asia, the models produced in Vietnam will also receive the 150 three-valve engine.

The second series went out of production in 2017 without any heir, concentrating the production of the low wheel scooter segment for Vespa brand vehicles.
