= Piaggio Sfera =

Scooter produced by Piaggio

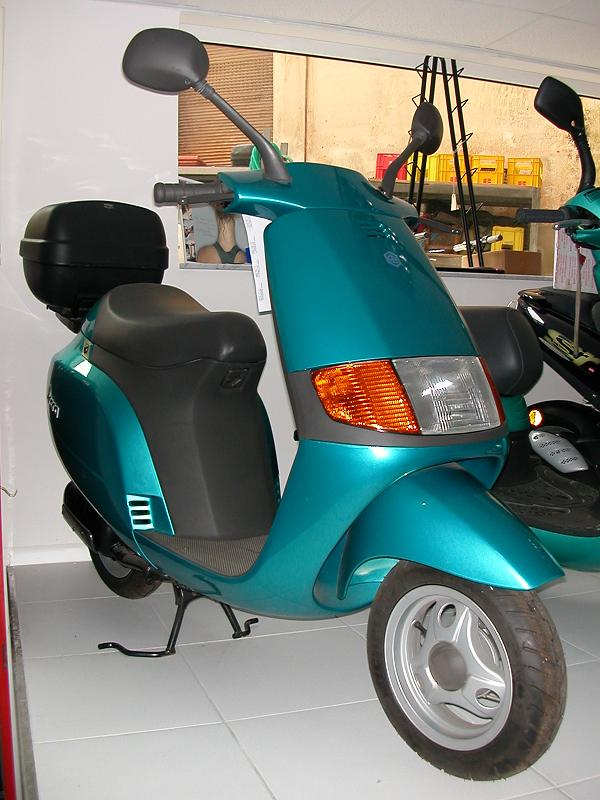
- Manufacturer: Piaggio
- Production: 1990–1998
- Assembly: Pontedera, Italy
- Successor: Piaggio Fly
- Class: Scooter
- Engine: 50 cc (3.1 cu in); 80 cc (4.9 cu in); 125 cc (7.6 cu in)
- Ignition type: Capacitor discharge electronic ignition (CDI)
- Transmission: CVT automatic; gear final drive
- Frame type: Tubular steel spine
- Brakes: Front; disc/expanding drum (type NSL); Rear; expanding drum
- Related: Gilera Typhoon; Piaggio Quartz

The Piaggio Sfera is a scooter produced by italian motorcycle manufacturer Piaggio from 1990 to 1998. The word "sfera" means "sphere" or "globe".

Presented at the Monte Carlo show in December 1990, it joined the Vespa in the 90's range of Piaggio motorcycles. The second series was born in 1995 and remained on the market until 1998. The first series was available in two displacements of 50 and 80 cm^{3}. In the second series, the engine capacity of the registered version rose to 125 cm^{3}. This was the first four-stroke engine made by Piaggio.

== First series (1990-1995) ==
The result of a project costing over 50 billion Italian lire, its introduction on the market, which took place at the Monte Carlo show in December 1990, was a small revolution as it was the first Piaggio scooter made with a plastic body. Designed by Luciano Marabese and produced in the Piaggio factory in Pontedera, in a short time the Sfera gathered much acclaim, above all for its simplicity: the design was innovative with clean lines, while the reliable mechanics were based on a 50 two-stroke engine (49.4 cm^{3} effective) 3.2 horsepower with air cooling and double drum brakes.

In 1991 he won the Compasso d'Oro award.

In 1992 the offer was expanded with the Sfera 80 which mounts a 74.72 cm^{3} engine delivering 9.6 horsepower, a different rear suspension, wider tires and a two-seater saddle with side handles and footrests for the passenger. The Sfera 50, on the other hand, was declined in three different versions: Maquillage, Cubik (with a two-seater saddle similar to the Sfera 80 but without side handles) and Antistarter (the same as the Maquillage but with the addition of the standard electronic anti-theft device).

In 1994, the Sfera underwent a slight restyling where the new two-seater saddle was introduced, bumper strips on the sides, new logo, new colors and adoption of the luggage rack and the range was reduced to the 50 cm^{3} Maquillage version only.

== Second series (1995-1998) ==
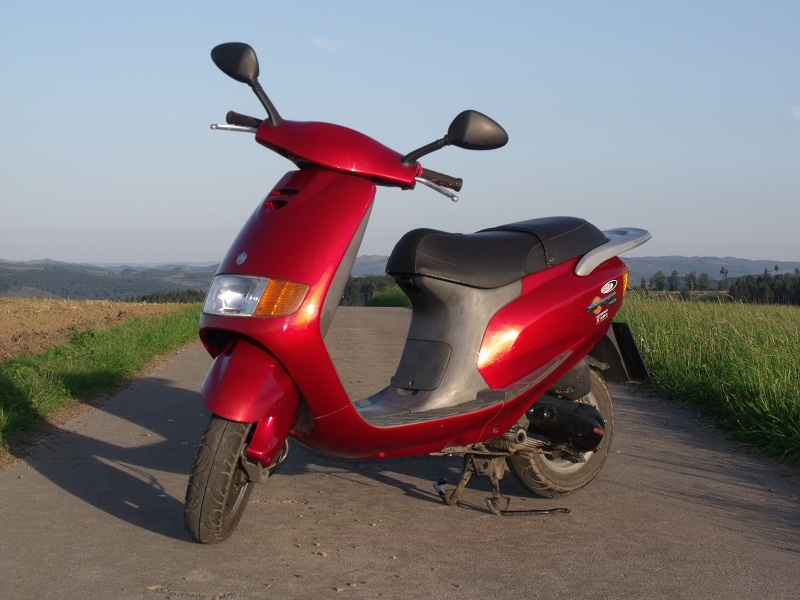
Sfera 125 (second series)

A completely new version of the Sfera was introduced in 1995. Alongside the 50 version, the 125 version with a four-stroke engine from the "Piaggio Four Stroke" family made its debut. The Sfera 125 differed from the 50 in the presence of the top box in the standard color and the wider saddle and footpegs. It remained unchanged until 1998, the year in which the Sfera went out of production without being replaced. The more recent Piaggio Fly is considered its natural heir.

== Derived models ==
Based on the Piaggio Sfera, two other scooters were developed: the Piaggio Quartz (basically, an equivalent version with a liquid-cooled engine) and the Gilera Typhoon.

== Piaggio Sfera Bimodale prototype ==
In April 1991 the hybrid Sfera Bimodale prototype was presented, which mounted a 50 internal combustion engine flanked by an electric motor: the operation is chosen between the two engines via a knob on the handlebar (and they cannot work in a combined way) . The thermal unit is made up of the same 3.4 HP 50 two-stroke engine marketed at its debut which is combined with a Vickers electric motor positioned on the wishbone. The electric motor delivers 0.5 kW (0.9 HP) and allows you to reach 25 km/h, it is combined with two 40 A lead-gel batteries. Recharging takes place via a power socket in about 6 hours.

The Sfera Bimodale will remain at the prototype stage although this technology will be seen again on the Piaggio Zip&Zip which will go into production in 1994.
