= Cecina railway station =

Railway station in Italy

Cecina
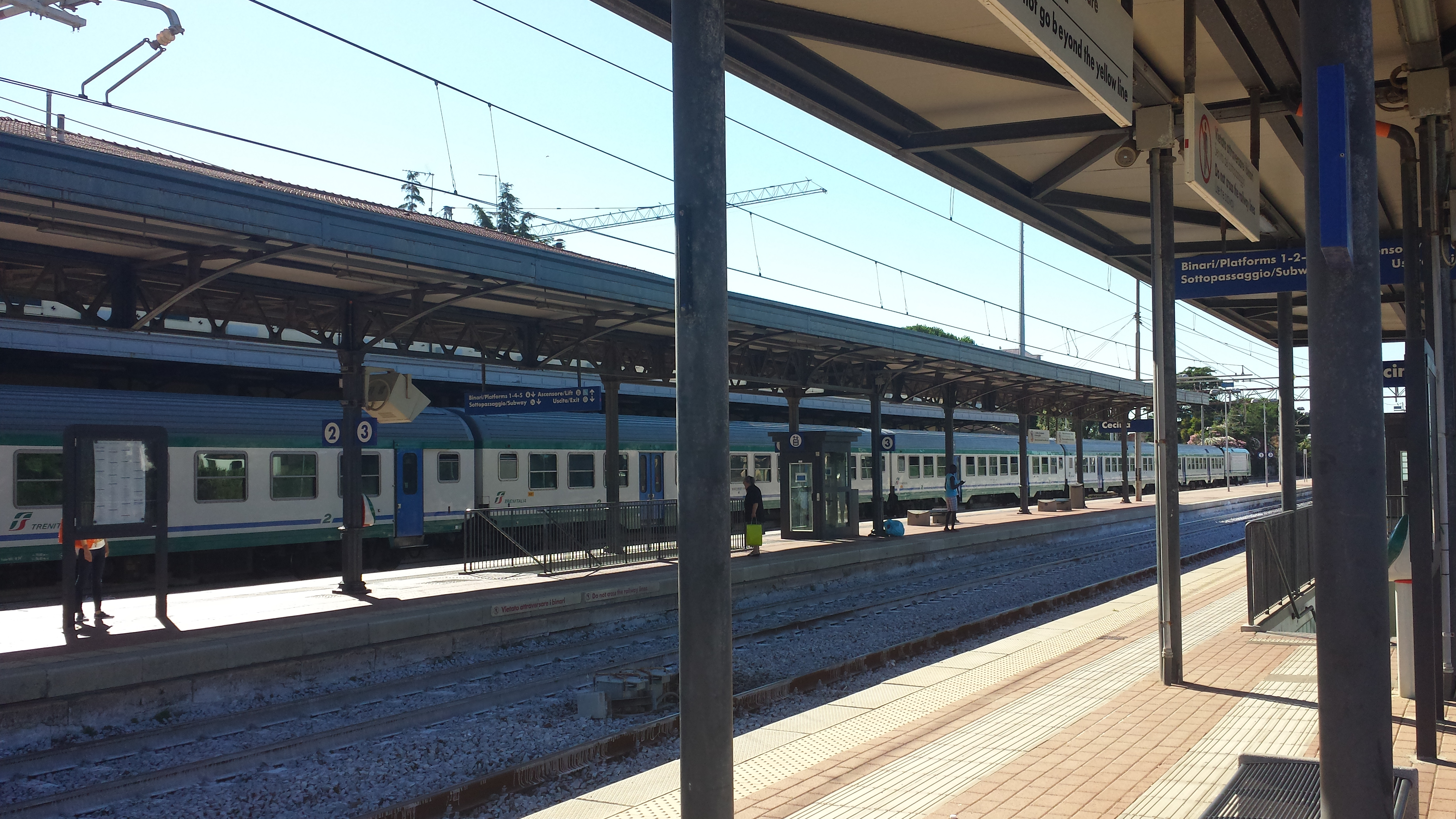
- View of the platforms

General information
- Location: Via Fratelli Rosselli; Cecina LI 57023; Cecina, Livorno, Tuscany; Italy
- Coordinates: 43°18′37″N 10°30′52″E
- Operator: Rete Ferroviaria Italiana; Trenitalia
- Lines: Tirrenica; Cecina-Volterra
- Distance: 281.592 km (174.973 mi) from Roma Termini

Other information
- Classification: Silver

History
- Opened: 20 October 1863; 162 years ago
Location
- Location within Tuscany Location within Italy

Cecina railway station is an Italian railway station on the Tirrenica railway line in Tuscany.

== History ==
It opened on 20 October 1863 with a northern section of the Tirrenica line, and opened on the same day as the Cecina-Volterra railway. After significant damage to the station building during the Second World War, the station building was rebuilt. From 2020 to 2021, the station was subject to a renovation, during which the platforms were raised and the underpass was upgraded.

== Train services and movements ==
Regular passenger services to the station are regionale, regionale veloce, Intercity and Frecciabianca services, that use the Tirrenica line to connect to Pisa Centrale, Roma Termini, Grosseto, Florence SMN, Piombino and further afield such as Genova.

== Gallery ==
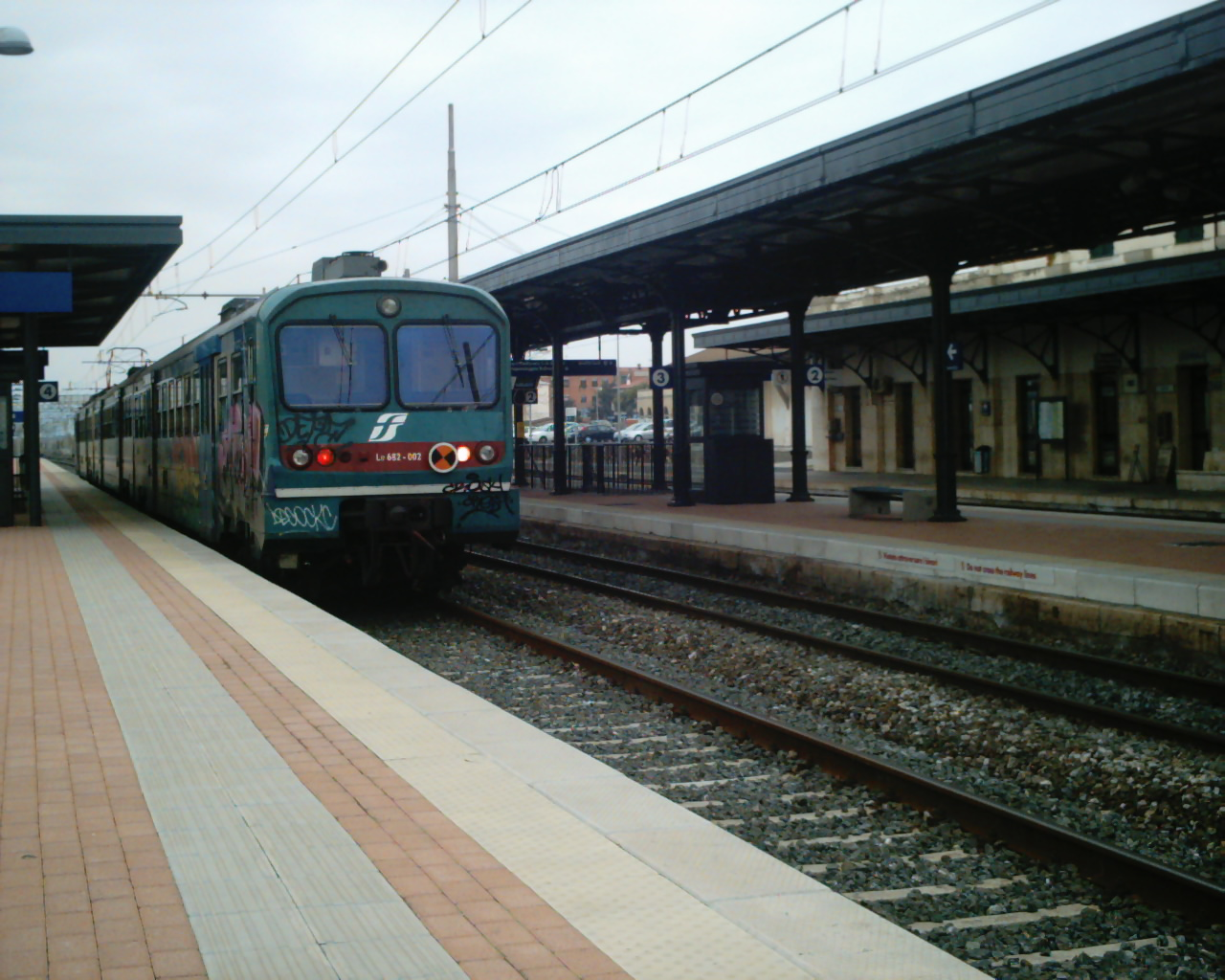
The platforms with a regionale service.

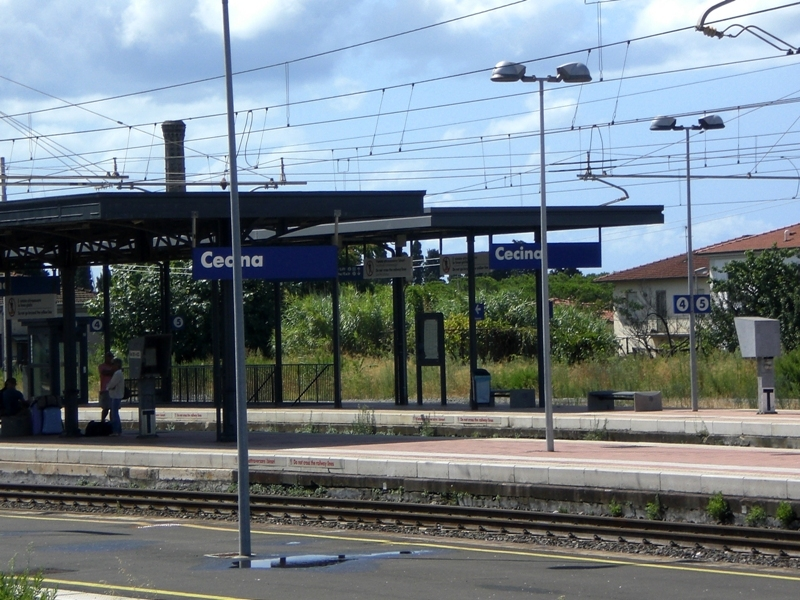
The northern end of the station.

== See also ==
- History of rail transport in Italy
- List of railway stations in Tuscany
- Rail transport in Italy
- Railway stations in Italy
