= White Eagle (1941 film) =

- Directed by: Carlos Hugo Christensen
- Written by: Yamandu Rodríguez
- Starring: Francisco Petrone; Pablo Palitos; Felipe Romito; Eduardo Cuitiño
- Cinematography: José María Beltrán
- Edited by: Nello Melli
- Music by: George Andreani
- Production company: Lumiton
- Distributed by: Lumiton
- Release date: 16 April 1941
- Running time: 77 minutes
- Country: Argentina
- Language: Spanish

White Eagle (Spanish:Águila blanca) is a 1941 Argentine drama film of the Golden Age of Argentine cinema, directed by Carlos Hugo Christensen and starring Francisco Petrone, Pablo Palitos and Felipe Romito.

== Cast ==
- Francisco Petrone
- Pablo Palitos
- Felipe Romito
- Eduardo Cuitiño
- Celia Podestá
- Tito Alonso
- Amanda Diana
- Mariana Martí
- Herminia Mancini
- Miguel Coiro
- Eduardo Primo

== Bibliography ==
- Rist, Peter H. Historical Dictionary of South American Cinema. Rowman & Littlefield, 2014.
