= Santissimo Crocifisso, Pontedera =

Roman Catholic church in Pontedera, Italy

Coordinates: 43.6639°N 10.6372°E

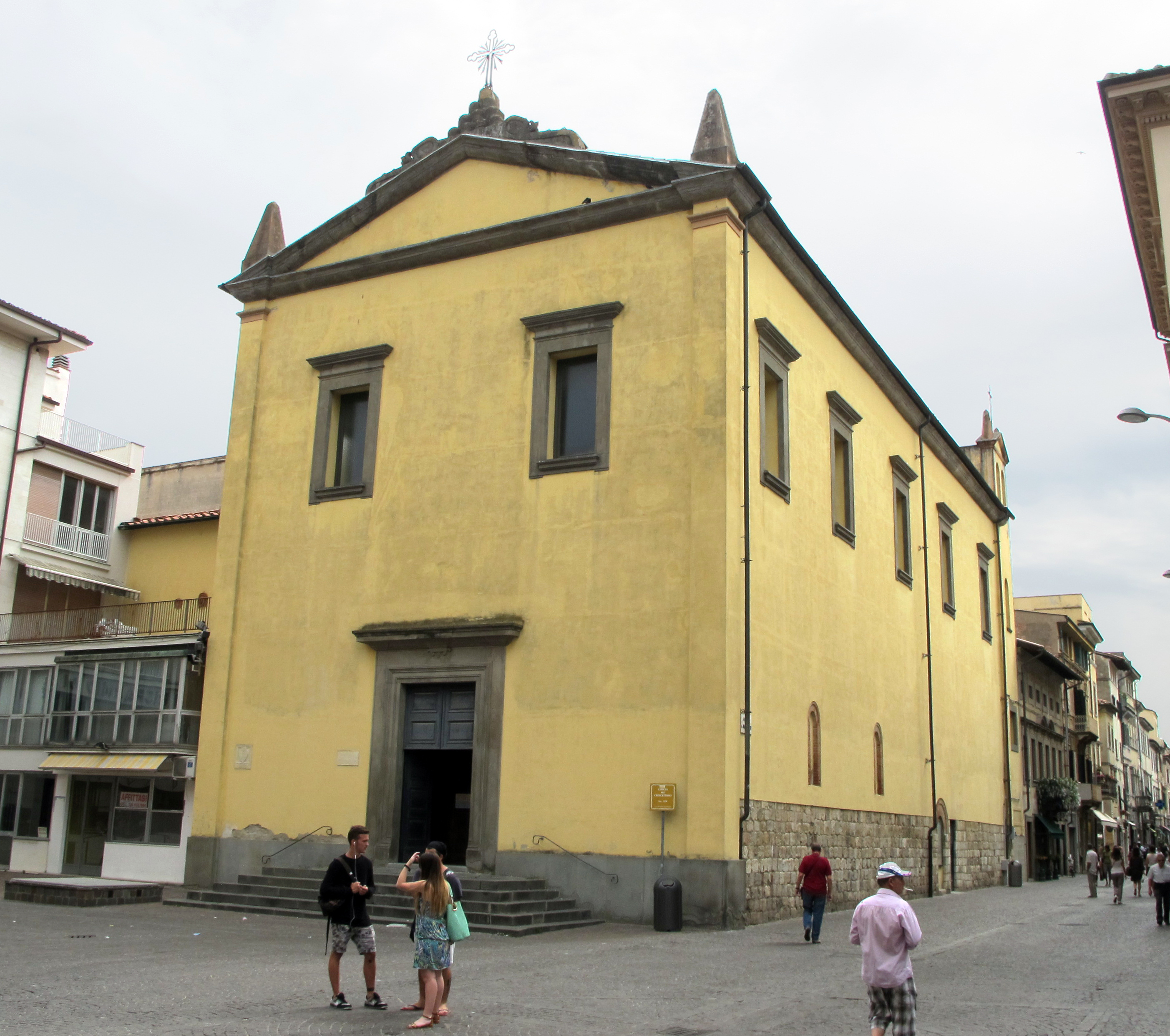

Santissimo Crocifisso is a Roman Catholic parish church, located in the center town of Pontedera in the province of Pisa, Tuscany, Italy.

== History ==
This church was originally dedicated to Saints Filippo, Jacopo, and Biagio (Phillip, Jacob, and Blaise) built in the town center in the 13th century to replace the functions of the extramural church of San Martino. Built originally between 1270 and 1272, the church suffered a devastating fire in on Holy Friday of 1612, which, putatively miraculously spared the altar crucifix. These events prompted a reconstruction and refurbishment. Only in 1936 was the dedication changed to that of the Holy Crucifix.

However, the church structure suffered severe damage from the allied bombardment of World War II. Restorations took place during 1956-1959 led by Renzo Bellucci. Part of the building was used by the town cinema until 2006. Further restrorations of the interiors and surrounding piazza were performed in the 21st century, under the directions of Fabio Scarpetti.

While the exterior is very plain, the interior holds various works of note:

- An altarpiece depicting the Madonna of the Rosary Between Saints Monica, Dominic, and Bishop Augustine (1595) by il Cigoli.
- An altarpiece depicting the Madonna and Child Interceding for Souls in Purgatory (1687–1689) by Benedetto Luti
- A silver tabernacle above the main altar sculpted in 18th century by Gaspare and Silvestro Mariotti; it holds the revered crucifix.
- Flanking the altar are silver reliquary busts of St Peter and a martyred saint
- A wooden Madonna of the Annunciation (14th century) from the studio of Nino Pisano
