= Montecastello, Pontedera =

Montecastello
- Frazione
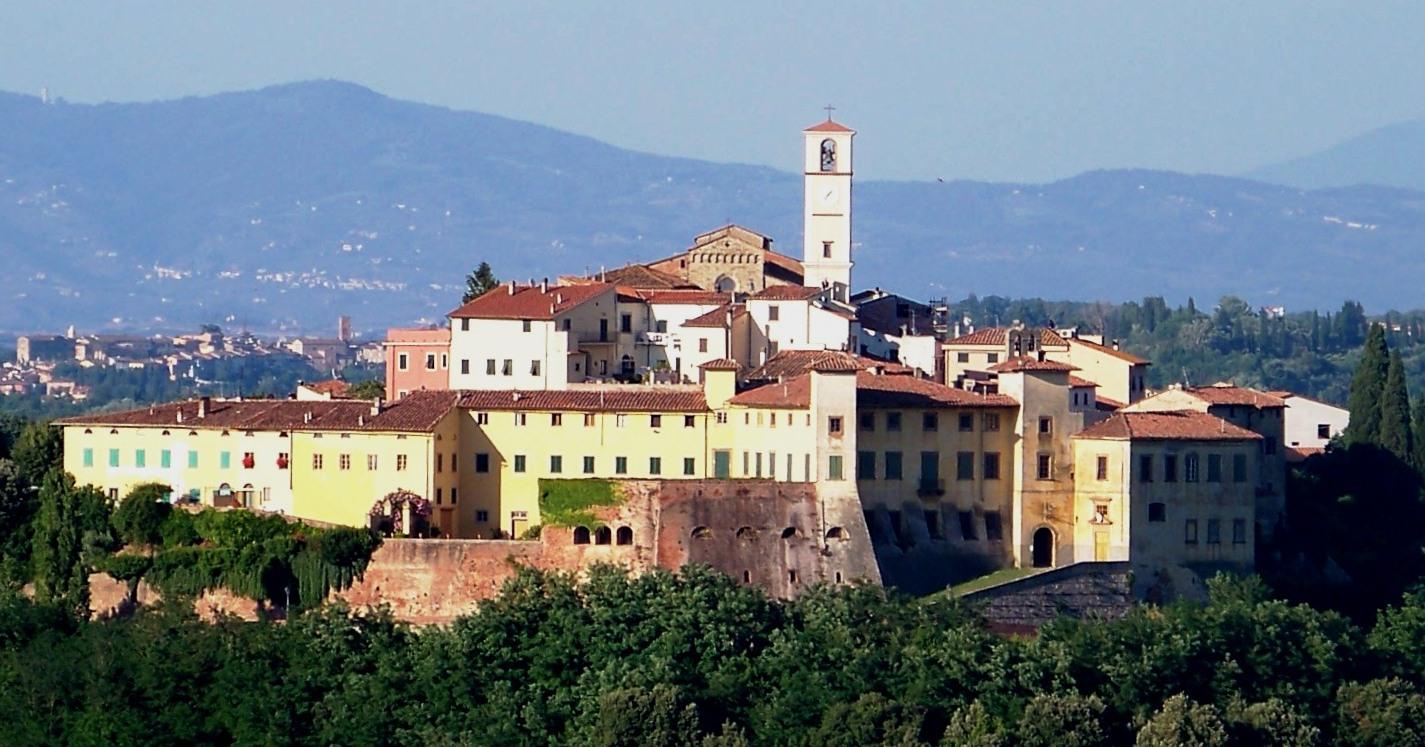

- Location of Montecastello in Italy
- Country: Italy
- Region: Tuscany
- Province: Pisa (PI)
- Comune: Pontedera
- Time zone: UTC+1 (CET)
  - Summer (DST): UTC+2 (CEST)

Montecastello is a frazione of the comune of Pontedera, in the province of Pisa, Tuscany, Italy. According to ISTAT, the population is 269.
