= Fabio Innocenti =

Italian volleyball player

Personal information
- Born: 22 February 1950 (age 76) Pontedera, Pisa, Italy
- Height: 1.84 m (6 ft 0 in)
- Weight: 73 kg (161 lb)

Sport
- Sport: Volleyball
- Club: CUS Pisa
Medal record
Men's volleyball
Representing Italy
World Championships
| Silver medal – second place | 1978 Rome | Team |
Summer Universiade
| Gold medal – first place | 1970 Turin | Team |

Fabio Innocenti (born 22 February 1950) is a retired Italian volleyball player.
