= La Rotta, Pontedera =

La Rotta
- Frazione
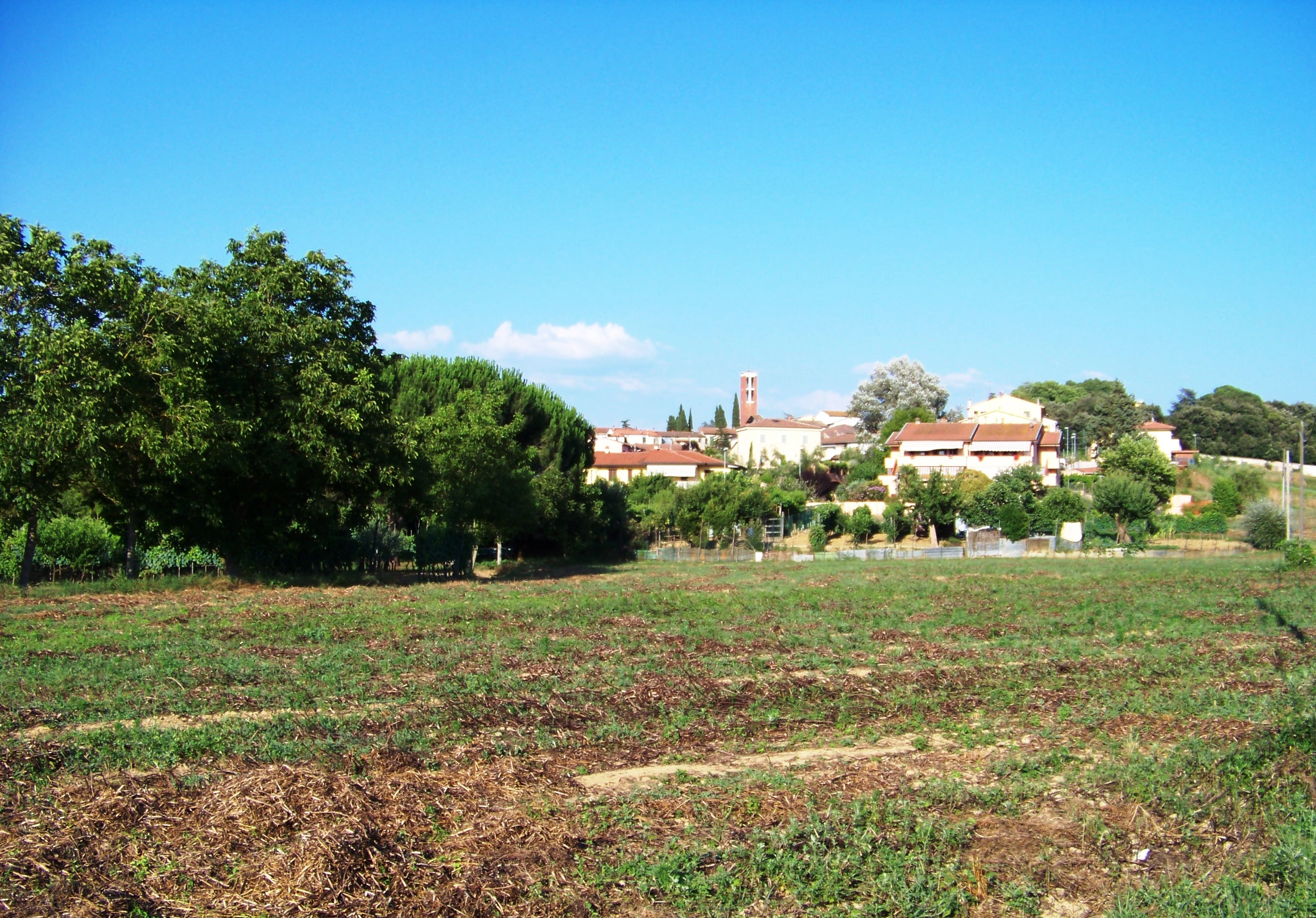

- Location of La Rotta in Italy
- Coordinates: 43°39′32″N 10°40′41″E
- Country: Italy
- Region: Tuscany
- Province: Pisa (PI)
- Comune: Pontedera
- Elevation: 36 m (118 ft)

Population (2011)
  - Total: 1,754
- Time zone: UTC+1 (CET)
  - Summer (DST): UTC+2 (CEST)
- Postal code: 56025
- Dialing code: (+39) 0587

La Rotta is a village in Tuscany, central Italy, administratively a frazione of the comune of Pontedera, province of Pisa. At the time of the 2001 census its population was 1,687.

La Rotta is about 30 km from Pisa and 4 km from Pontedera.

Monuments of La Rotta

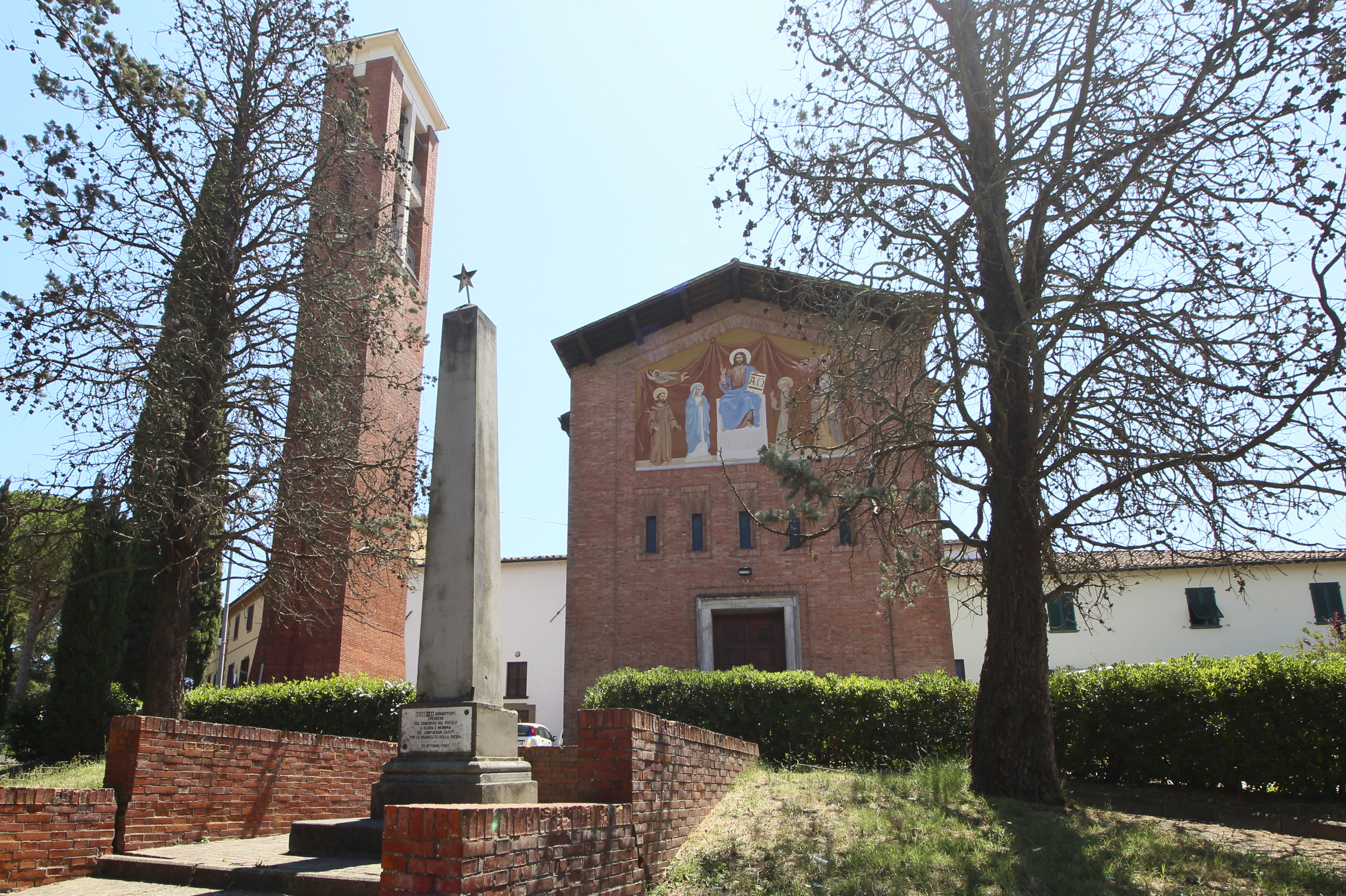
The church of San Matteo

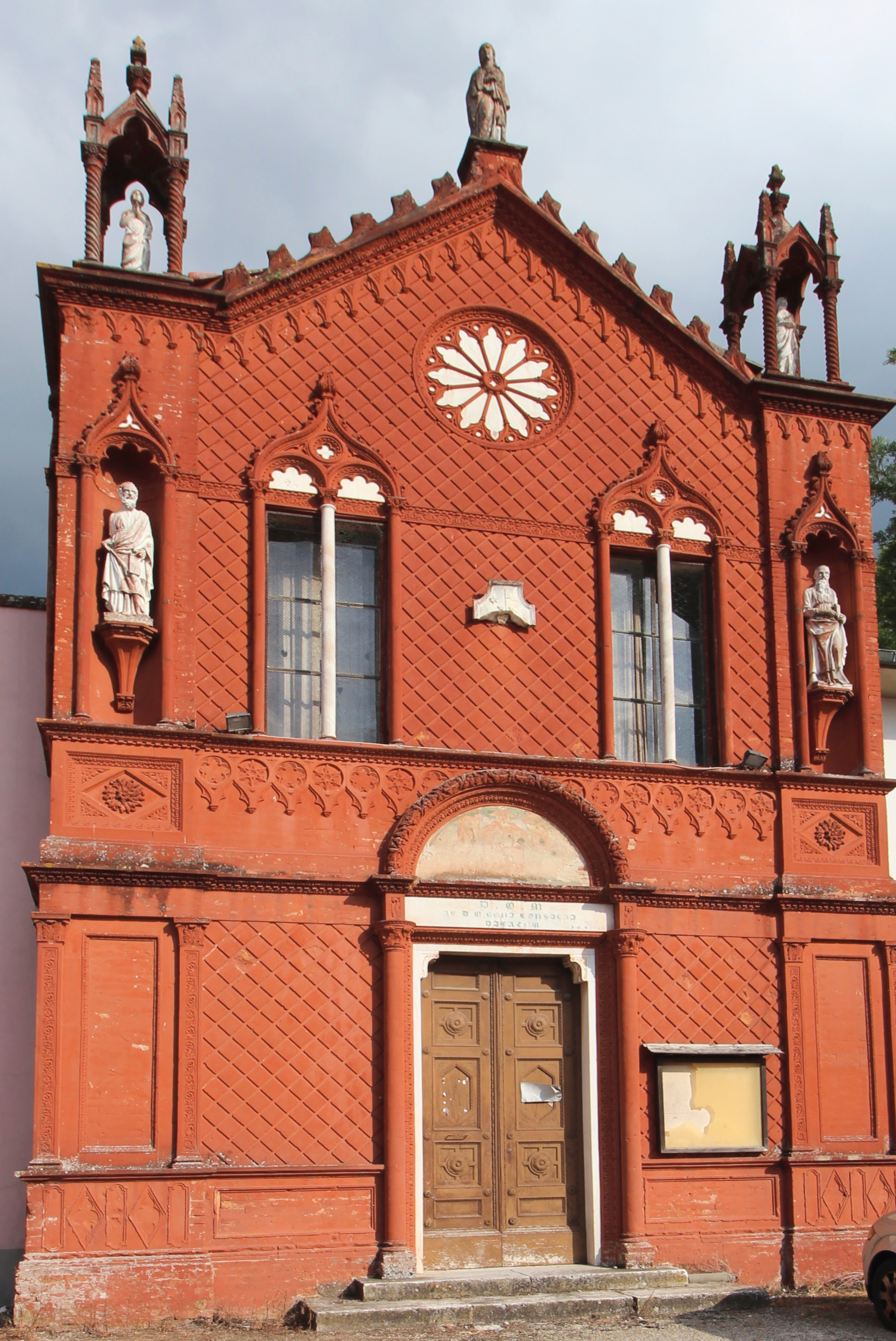
The church Madonna del Buon Consiglio

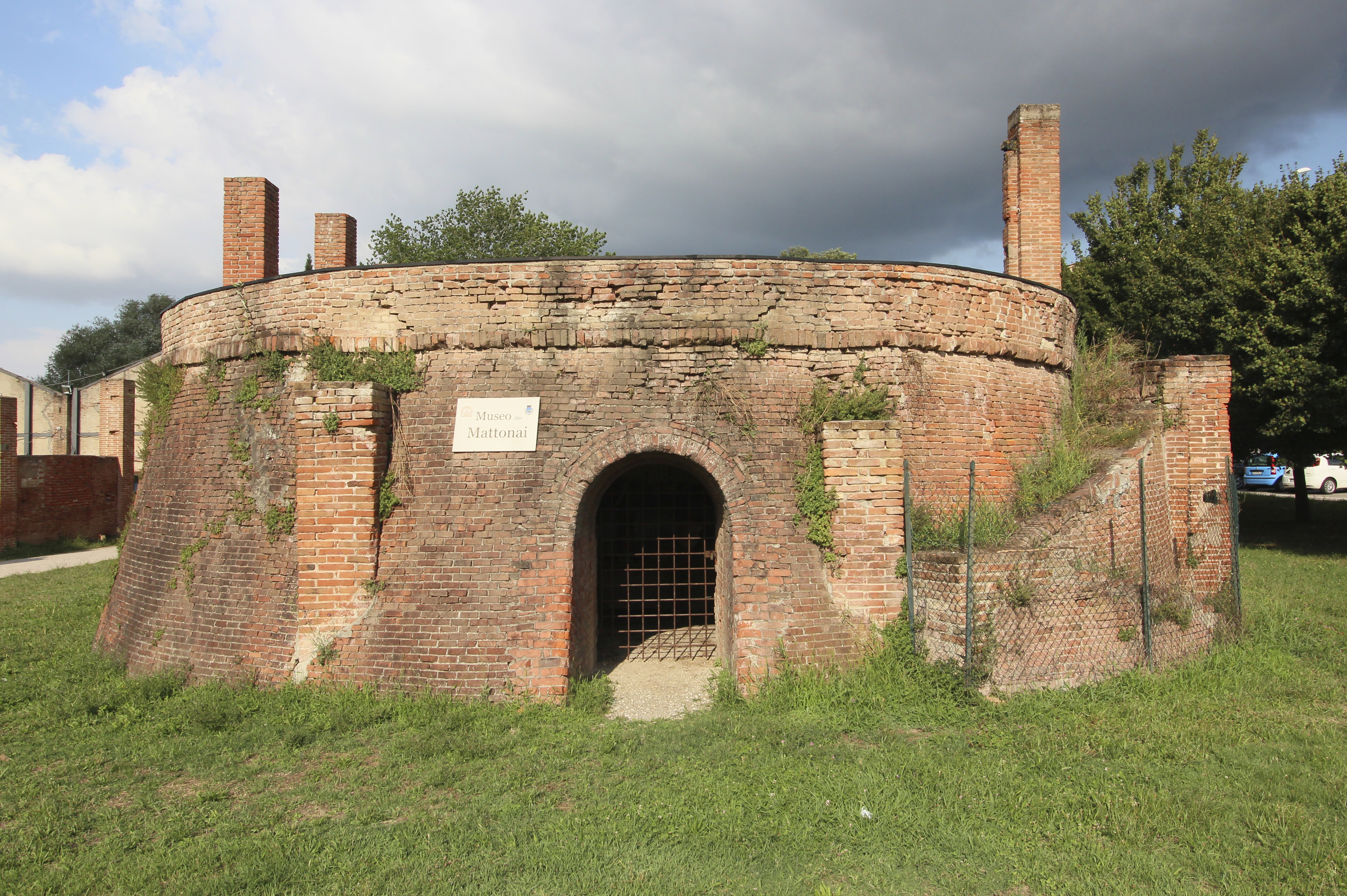
The museum Museo dei Mattonai
