= Cecina-Volterra railway =

Railway line in Italy

Cecina-Volterra railway line
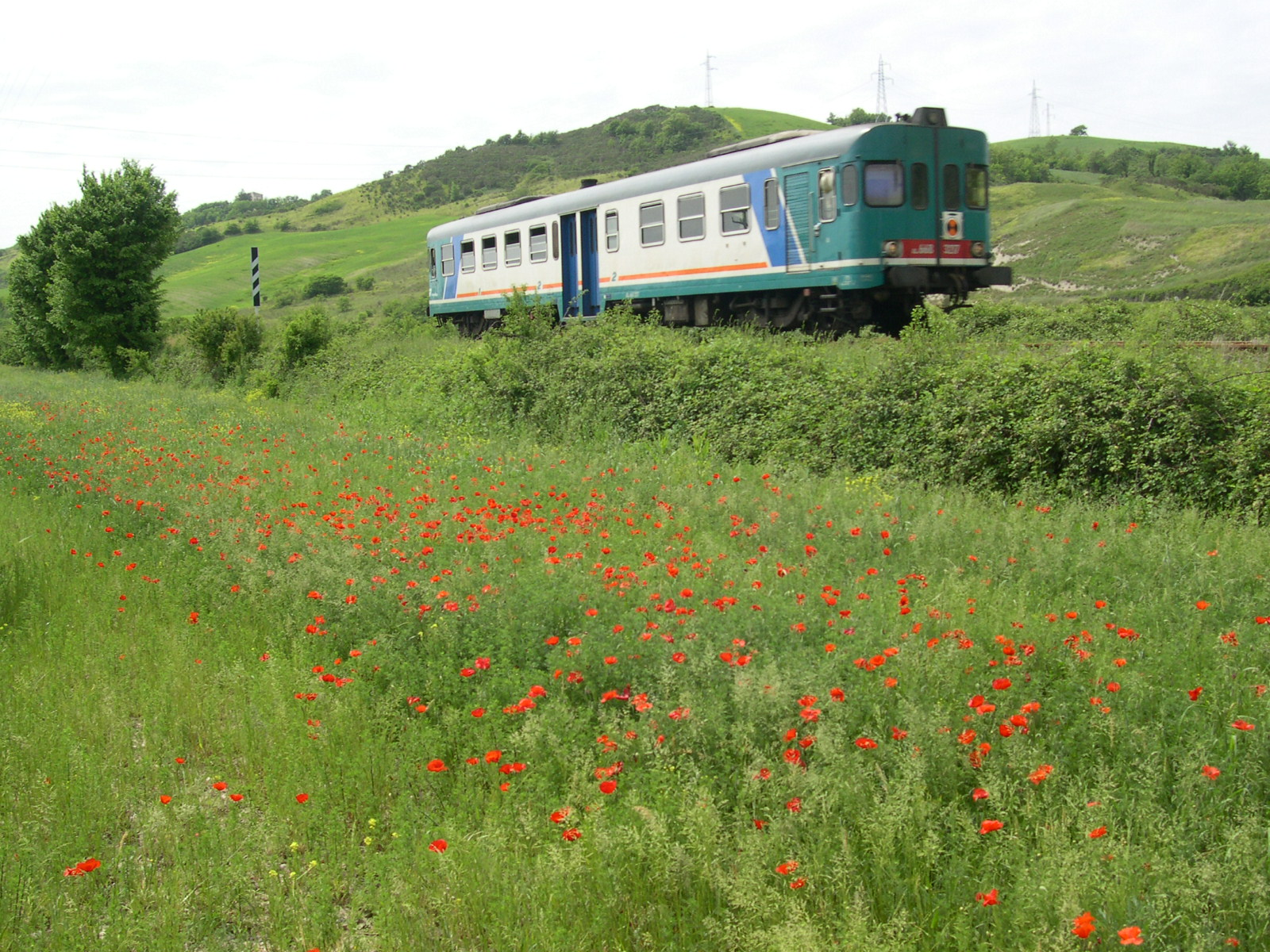
- The line near Saline di Volterra

Overview
- Status: in use
- Owner: Rete Ferroviaria Italiana
- Locale: Tuscany, Italy
- Termini: Cecina; Volterra Saline Pomarance
- Stations: 5

Service
- Type: Heavy rail

History
- Opened: 1863 (Cecina-Saline di Volterra); 1912 (Saline di Volterra-Volterra)
- Closed: 1958 (Saline di Volterra-Volterra)

Technical
- Number of tracks: 1
- Track gauge: 1,435 mm (4 ft 8 1/2 in) standard gauge
- Electrification: no

The Cecina-Volterra railway line is an Italian railway line that connects the coast town of Cecina to Saline di Volterra in Tuscany. Until 1958 it continued up into the medieval hilltop town of Volterra.

== History ==
The construction began in 1860, with the line opening between Cecina and Saline di Volterra. There was a plan announced in 1863 to extend the line to the Central Tuscan railway at Poggibonsi, but this was never realised. The line had a small connection to a mine at Monterufoli, which provided a substantial freight traffic until it was dismantled in 1928. In 1912, a rack railway using the Strub system was opened, connecting Saline di Volterra with Volterra town. This line was closed in 1958.

== Traffic ==
The line is kept open to provide connections to school for residents of the valley. The line was served by regionale services until early 2020, when they were suspended due to the COVID-19 pandemic. These were expected to recommence for the 2020-21 school period but this never happened and replacement bus services have been continued indefinitely.

== Gallery ==
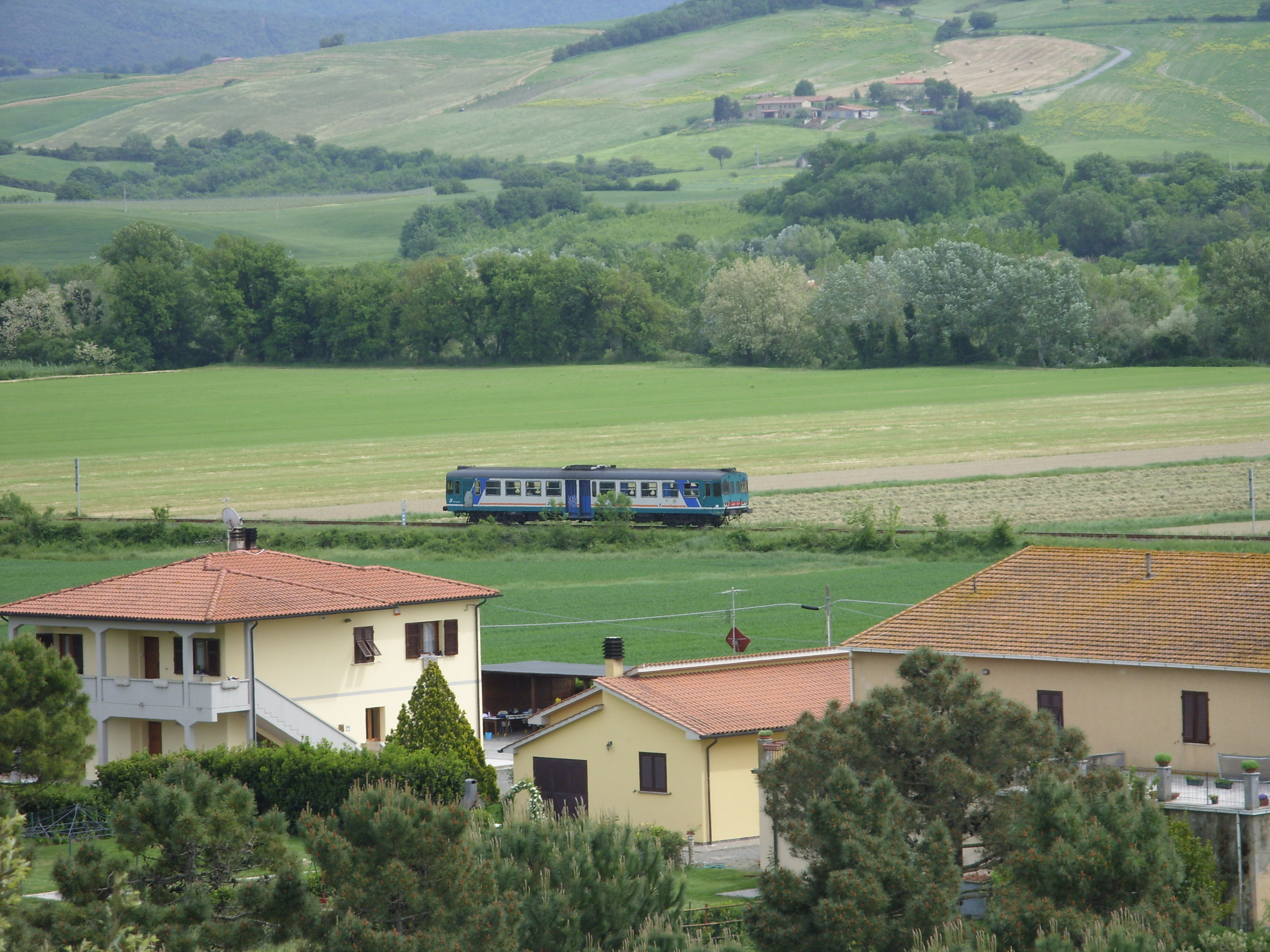
An ALn 663 railcar near Casino di Terra.

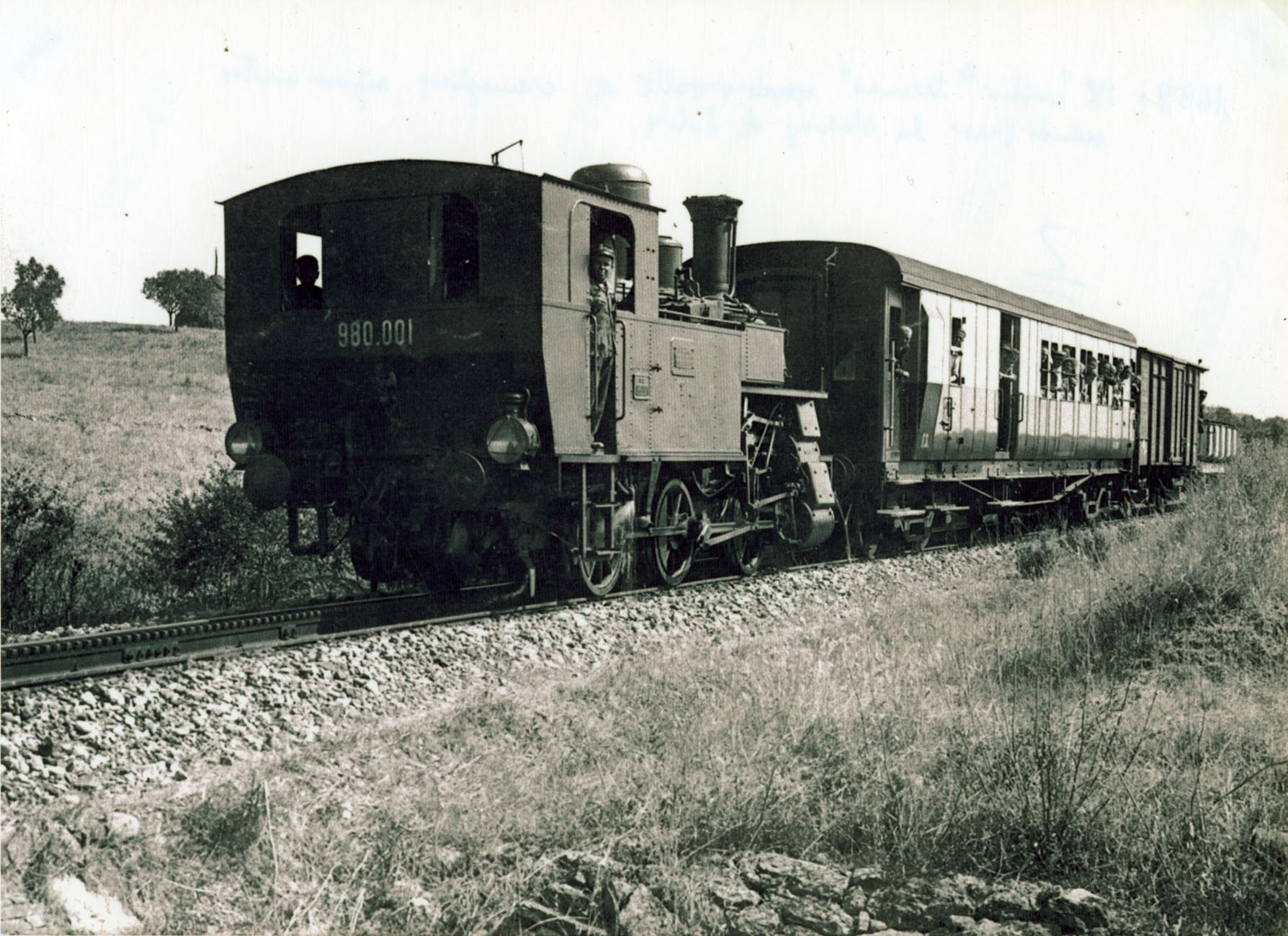
A service on the rack and pinion section, closed since 1958, photographed in 1938.

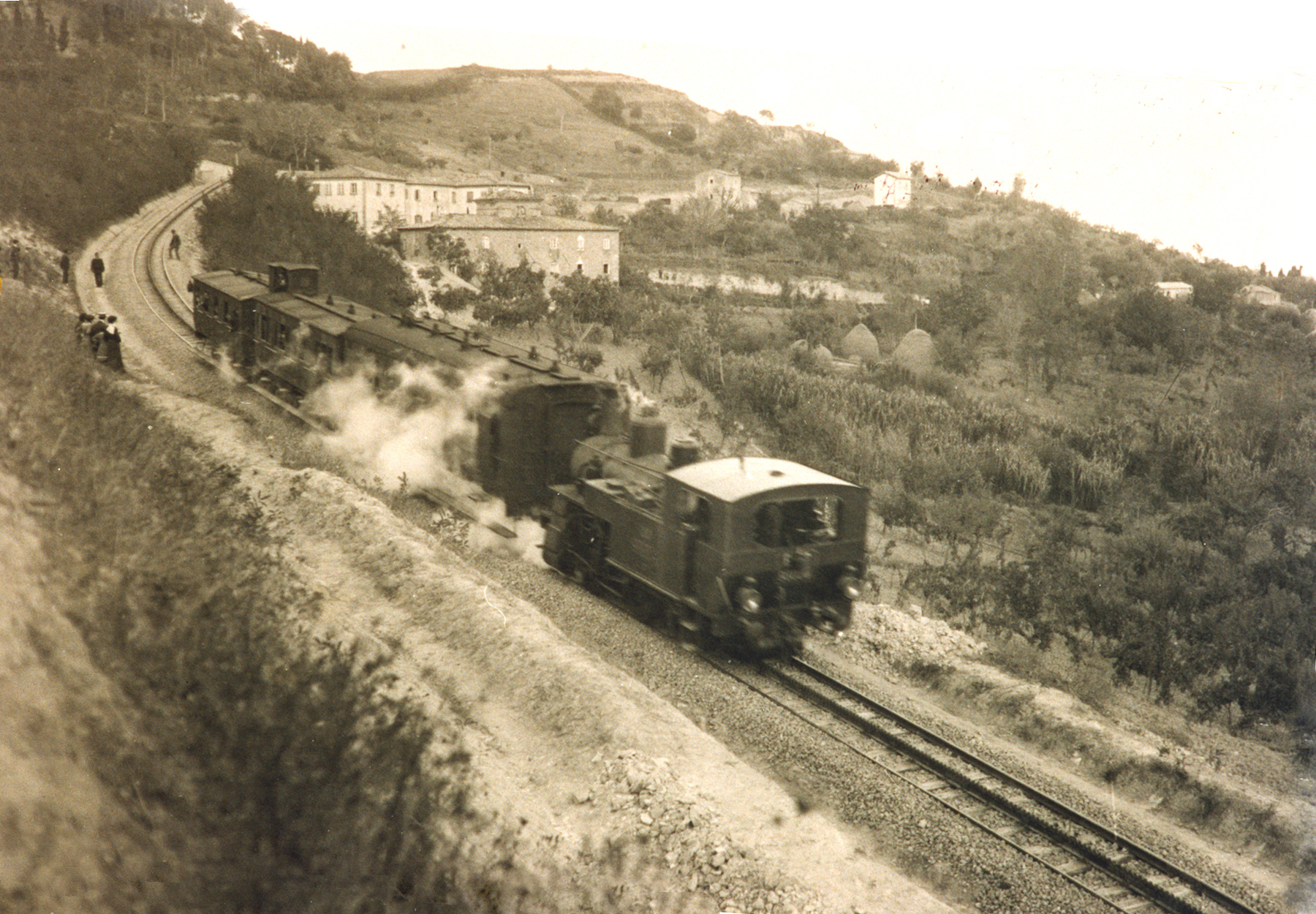
Another service, this time in 1912, the year this section opened.

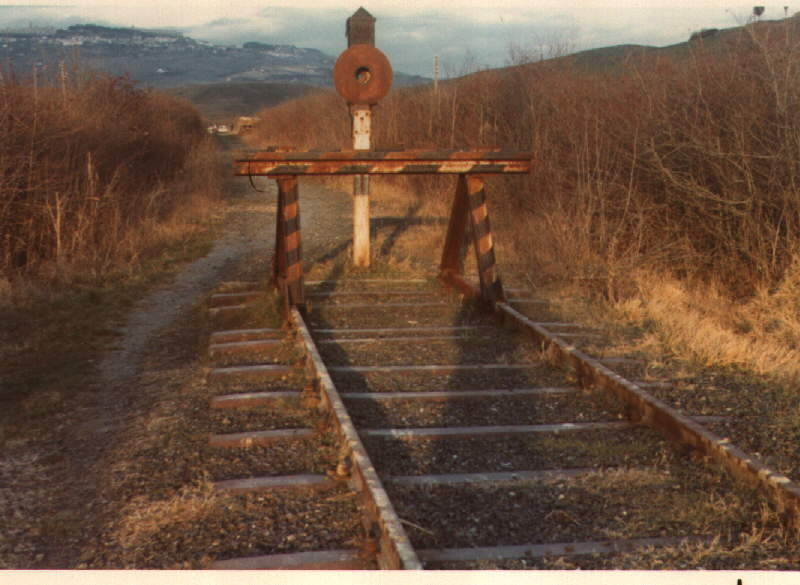
The end of the line after the Volterra-Saline di Volterra section was closed in 1958.

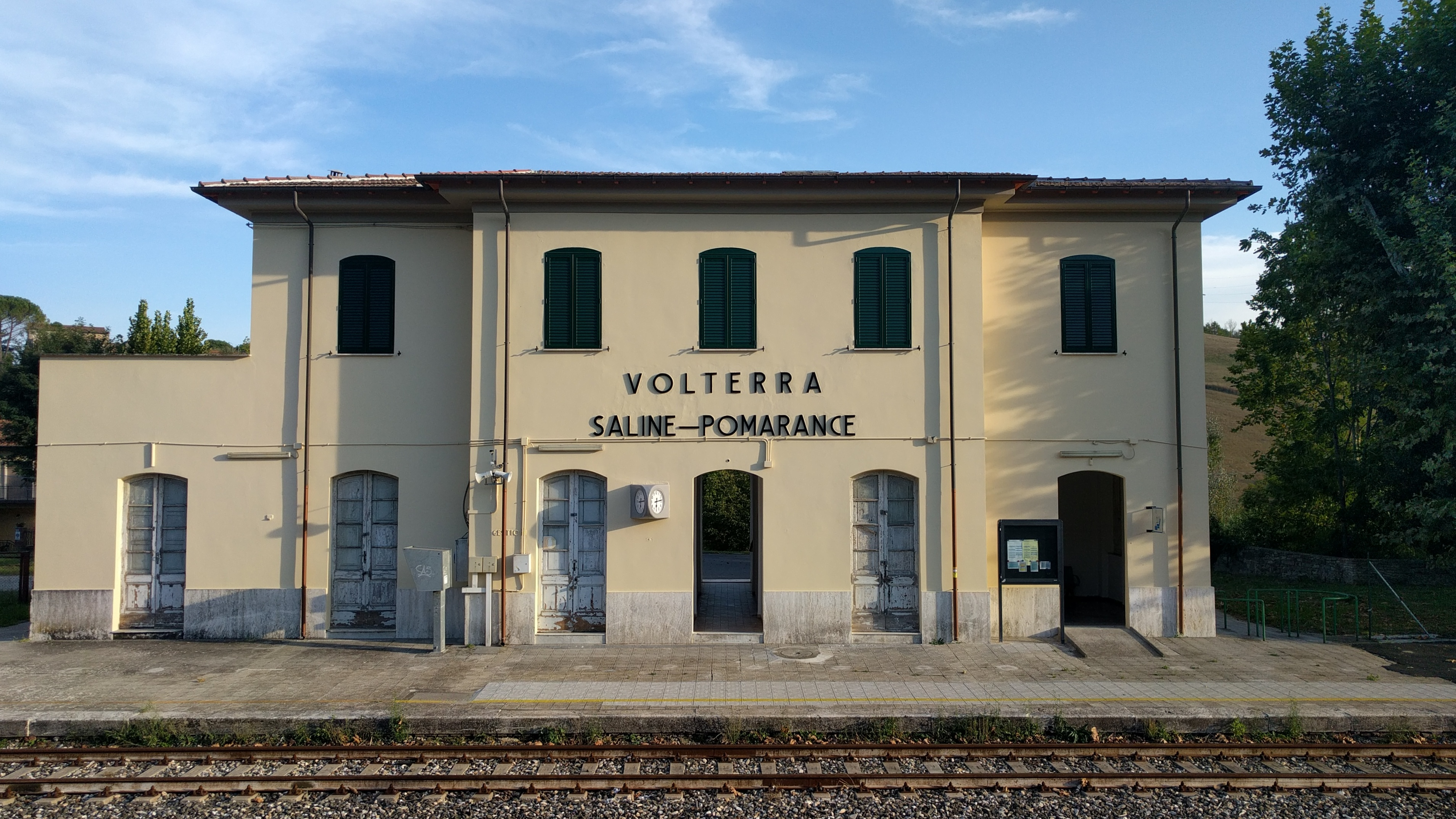
Volterra Saline Pomarance station, as seen nowadays.

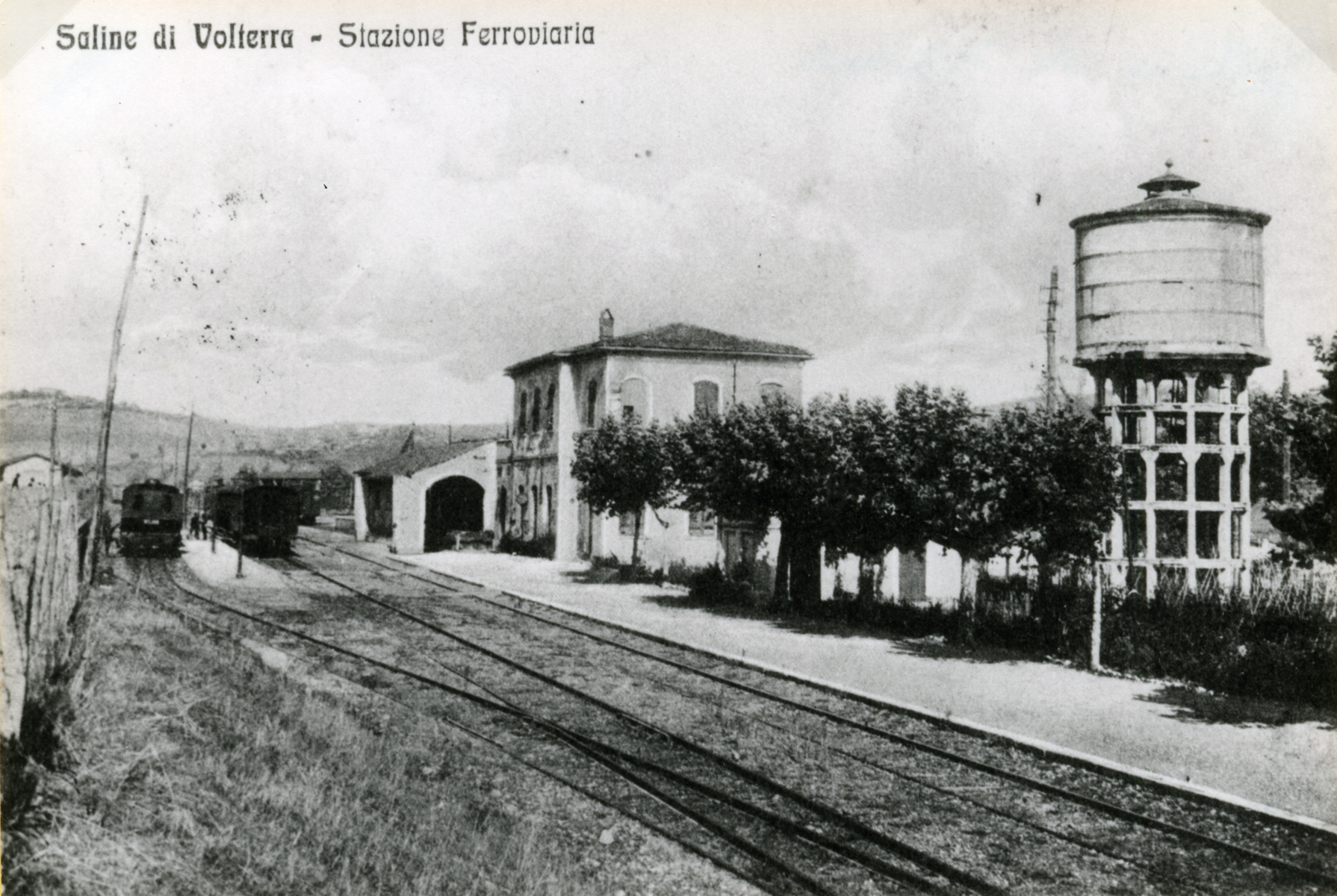
Saline di Volterra railway station, now named Volterra Saline Pomarance, in 1912.

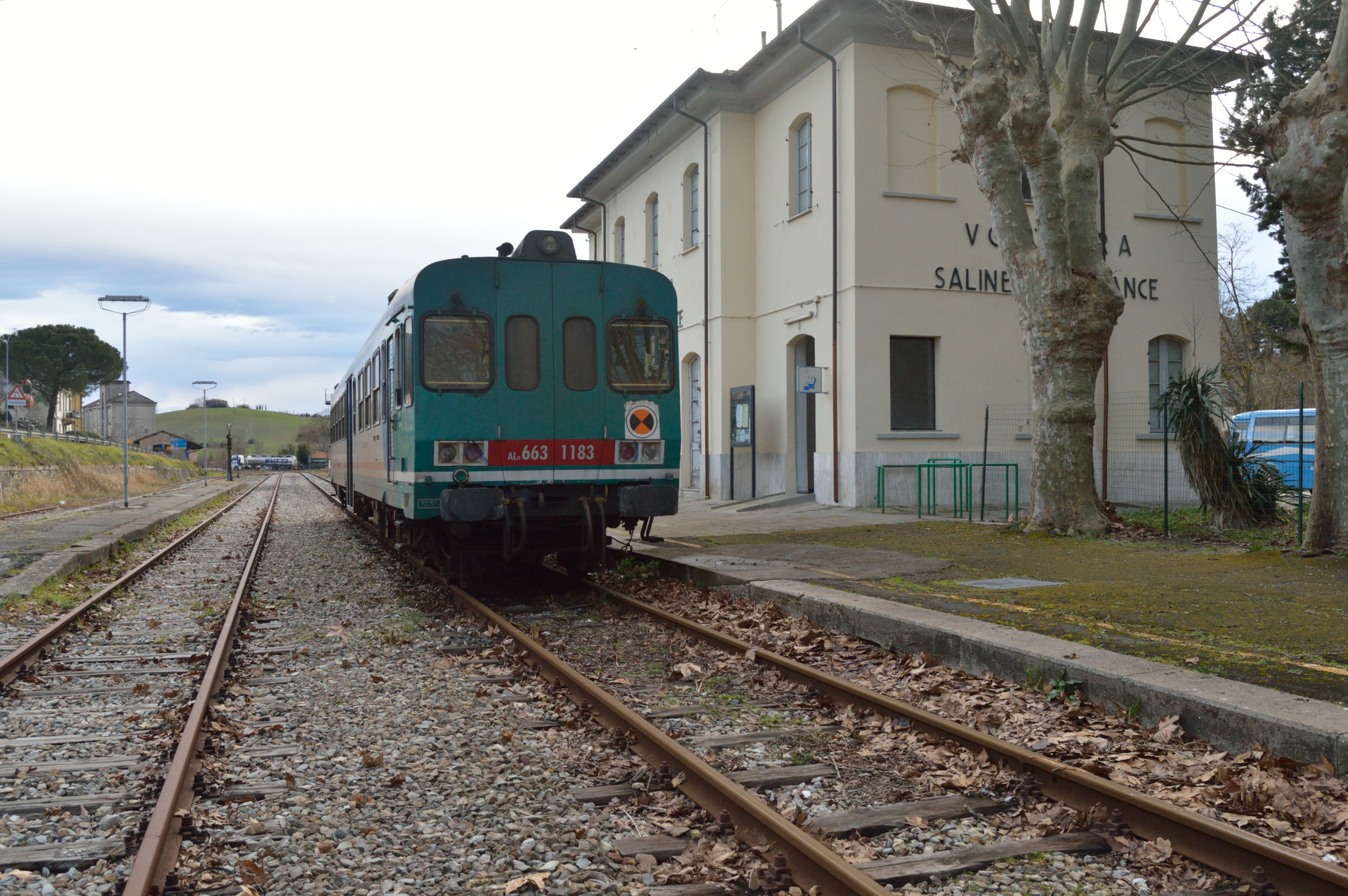
Volterra Saline Pomarance station with an ALn 663 railcar waiting to depart.
