= Pardossi =

- Frazione
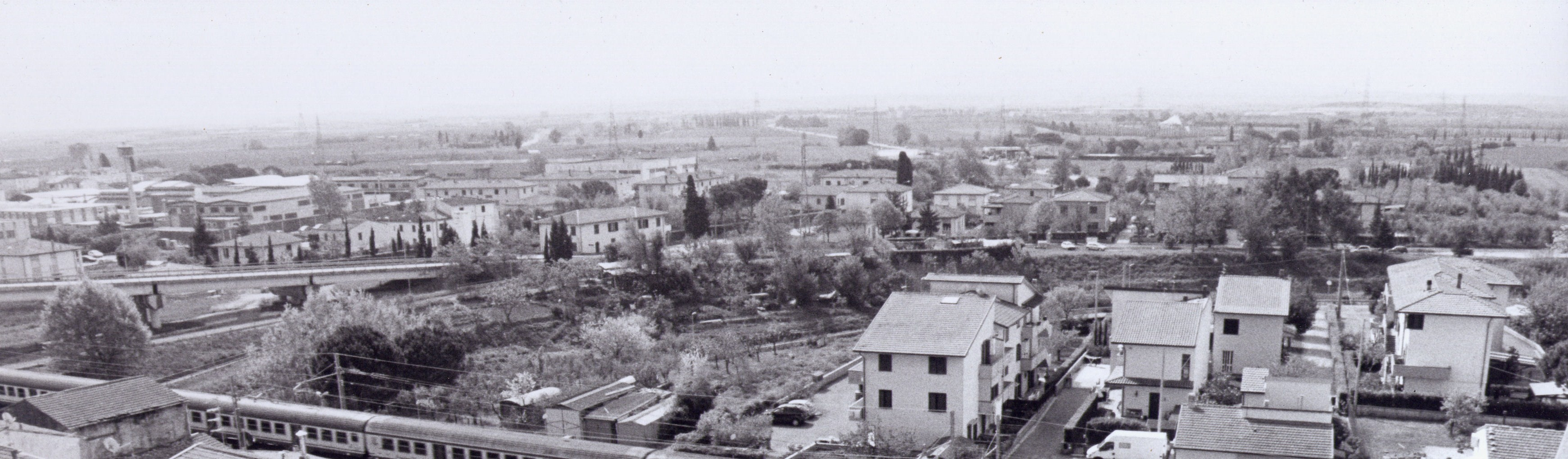
- View of Pardossi

- Location of Pardossi in Italy
- Coordinates: 43°39′55″N 10°34′24″E
- Country: Italy
- Region: Tuscany
- Province: Pisa (PI)
- Comune: Pontedera
- Elevation: 12 m (39 ft)

Population (2001)
  - Total: 395
- Time zone: UTC+1 (CET)
  - Summer (DST): UTC+2 (CEST)
- Postal code: 56025
- Dialing code: (+39) 0587

Pardossi is a village in Tuscany, central Italy, administratively a frazione of the comune of Pontedera, province of Pisa. At the time of the 2001 census its population was 395.

Pardossi is about 20 km from Pisa and 6 km from Pontedera.
