= Gello, Pontedera =

Gello
- Frazione
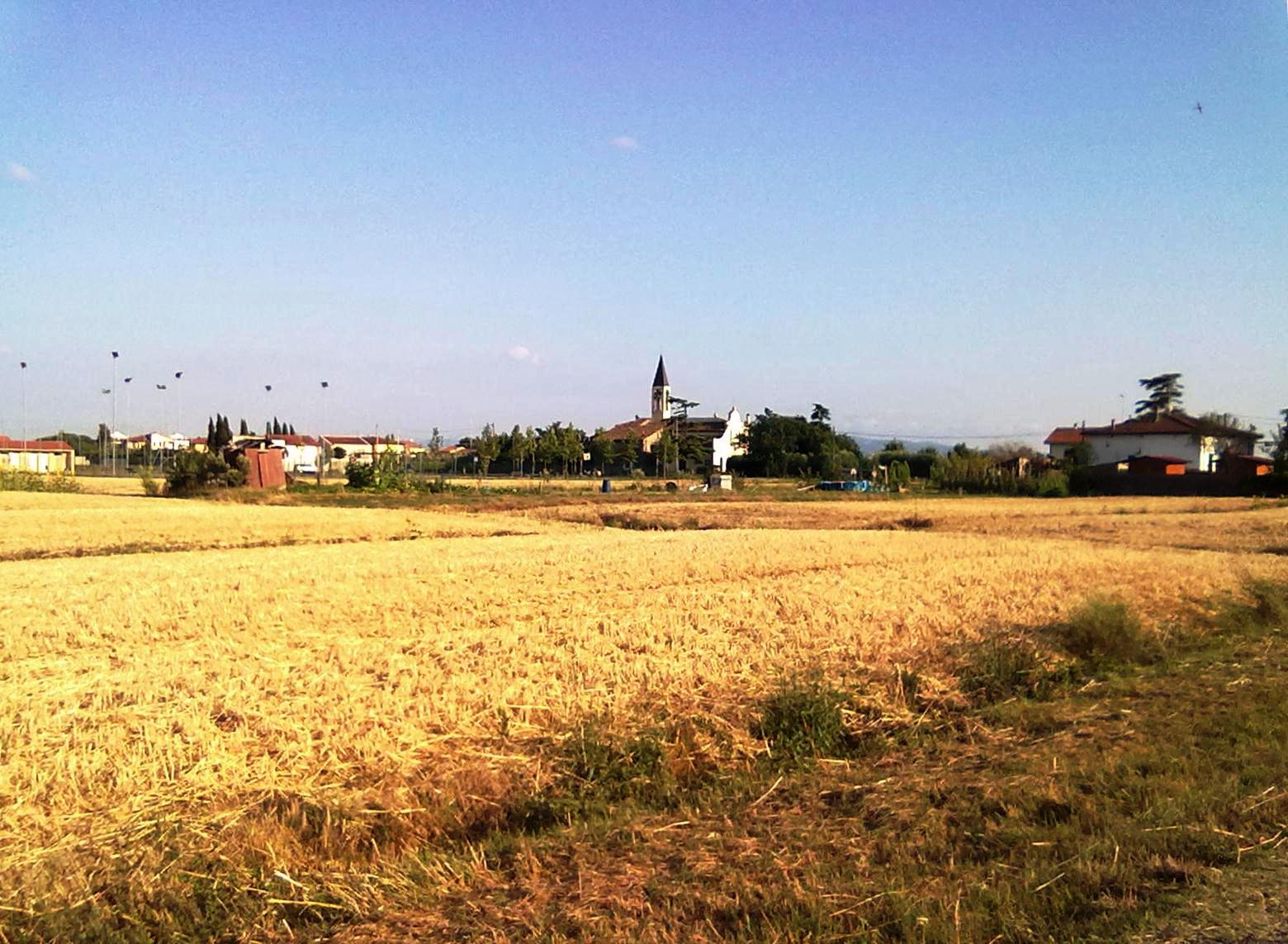

- Location of Gello in Italy
- Coordinates: 43°38′9″N 10°35′58″E
- Country: Italy
- Region: Tuscany
- Province: Pisa (PI)
- Comune: Pontedera
- Elevation: 12 m (39 ft)

Population (2011)
  - Total: 395
- Time zone: UTC+1 (CET)
  - Summer (DST): UTC+2 (CEST)
- Postal code: 56025
- Dialing code: (+39) 0587

Gello is a village in Tuscany, central Italy, administratively a frazione of the comune of Pontedera, province of Pisa. At the time of the 2001 census its population was 284.

Gello is about 24 km from Pisa and 6 km from Pontedera.
