= Church of Santi Jacopo and Filippo, Pontedera =

Church in Pontedera, Italy

Coordinates: 43.6620°N 10.6364°E

The Church of Santi Jacopo and Filippo, also known as the Chiesa Nuova and the Duomo, is a Roman Catholic church in Pontedera, Tuscany, Italy. Built between 1840 and 1864, it serves as the main place of worship for the residents of Pontedera.

== History ==
The bell tower.

The church was built in the Neoclassical style between 1842 and 1864, to a design by the Florentine engineer Giuseppe Michelacci. The church was consecrated in 1874. The bell tower was added in 1937, and was destroyed during the Second World War and rebuilt in 1954.

== Architecture ==
View of the interior of the church.

The building has a longitudinal floor plan, with three apses forming the ends of the transept and choir. The façade is preceded by a pronaos consisting of eight columns, above which is a semicircular window inspired by Roman thermal architecture.

The interior is divided into three naves and houses numerous works of art, including the Annunciation by Jacopo Chimenti, known as L’Empoli; the altarpiece Madonna della Mercede by Francesco Curradi (17th century, although the accompanying inscription still attributes it to the workshop of L’Empoli); and the Deposition, by an unknown artist. Other notable features include the relics of Saint Faustino and frescoes by Dilvo Lotti. A copy of Andrea del Sarto's painting Madonna and Child with Saint Elizabeth and the Infant Saint John the Baptist is preserved in the rectory.
