= Era (river) =

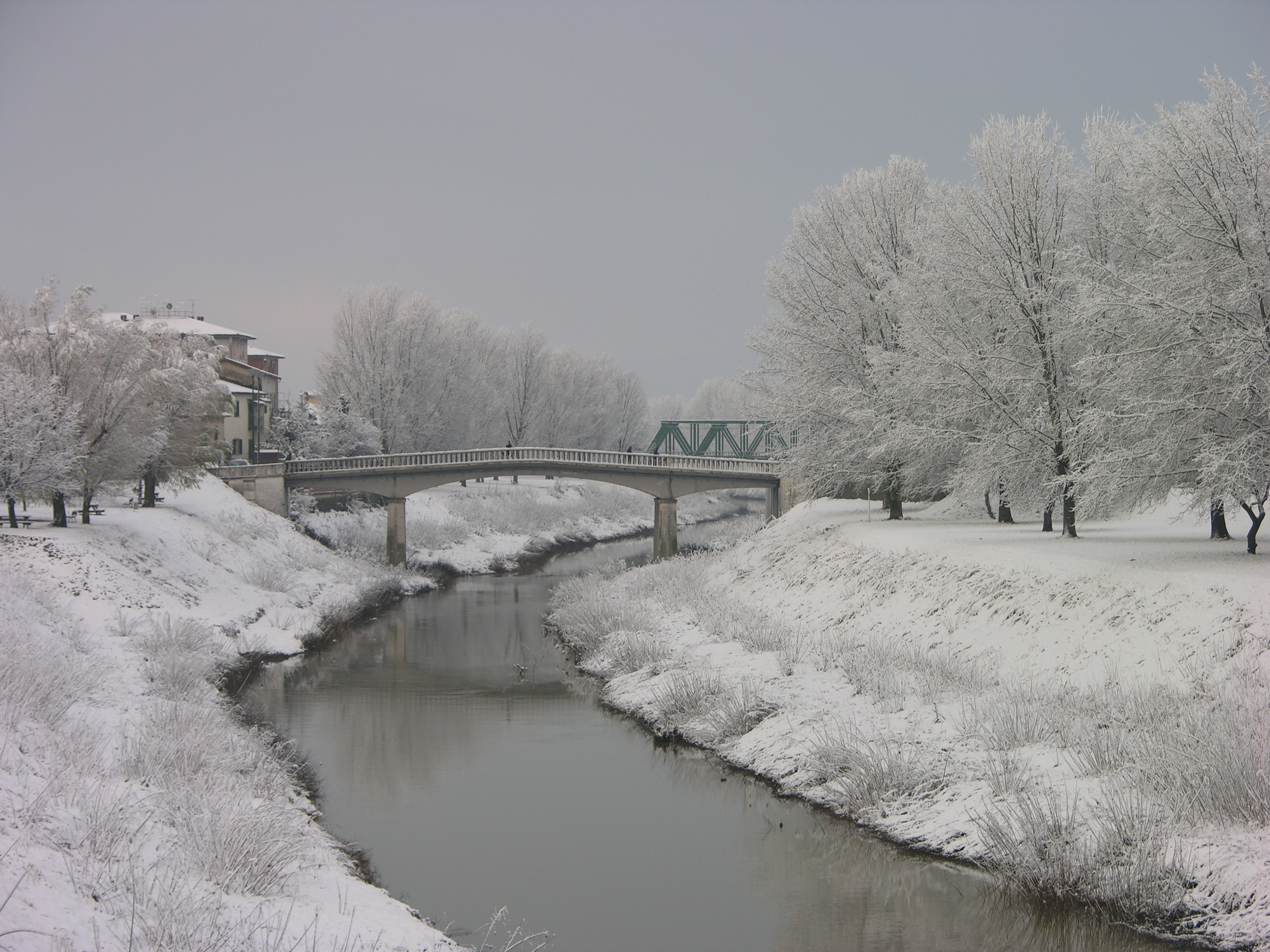
- The Era as it passes Pontedera.

Location
- Country: Italy

Physical characteristics
- Mouth: Arno
  - location: Pontedera
  - coordinates: 43°39′57″N 10°38′00″E
- Length: 54 km (34 mi)

Basin features
- Progression: Arno→ Tyrrhenian Sea

The Era is a river in Tuscany in Italy. It rises near Volterra and flows into the Arno river at Pontedera.

The Era is 54 km long, and its main tributaries are: (on the left) Cascina river, Ragone torrent, Sterza torrent, and (on the right) Capriggine torrent and Roglio torrent.

In 1966, the river flooded the town of Pontedera.
