= Castellani (wine) =

Italian wine company

Coordinates: 43.6456757°N 10.605771°E

Castellani Spa
- Industry: Winery
- Genre: Italian winery
- Founded: 1903
- Headquarters: Fraz. Santa Lucia, Pontedera; Tuscany, Italy
- Area served: Worldwide
- Key people: Piergiorgio Castellani Jr., Roberto Castellani, Giorgio Castellani
- Products: Italian wine
- Website: www.castelwine.com

Founded in 1903, Castellani Spa is a family-run Italian wine company headquartered in Pontedera, near Pisa. Castellani produces wine from five main Tuscan estates, as well as from areas throughout Italy, and is distributed internationally in 42 countries.

== Estates ==
=== Antiche Tenute Burchino ===
Located in Terricciola, a medieval village in the Pisan hills, this estate includes more than 42 hectares of vineyards. Antiche Tenute Burchino has been owned by the Castellani family since the middle of nineteenth century.

=== Tenuta Poggio al Casone ===
Located in Crespina in the Pisan hills, this estate includes more than 40 hectares of vineyards.

=== Tenuta Di Campomaggio ===
Located near the medieval town of Radda, in the middle of the Chianti Classico region, this estate includes more than 100 hectares of vineyards.

=== Fattoria di Travalda ===
Located in Santa Lucia, at the foot of the Pisan hills, this estate includes more than 5 hectares of land.

=== Tenuta di Ceppaiano ===
Located on the bank of the Arno River in the province of Pisa, this estate includes more than 40 hectares of vineyards.
