= Pontedera =

- Comune
- Città di Pontedera
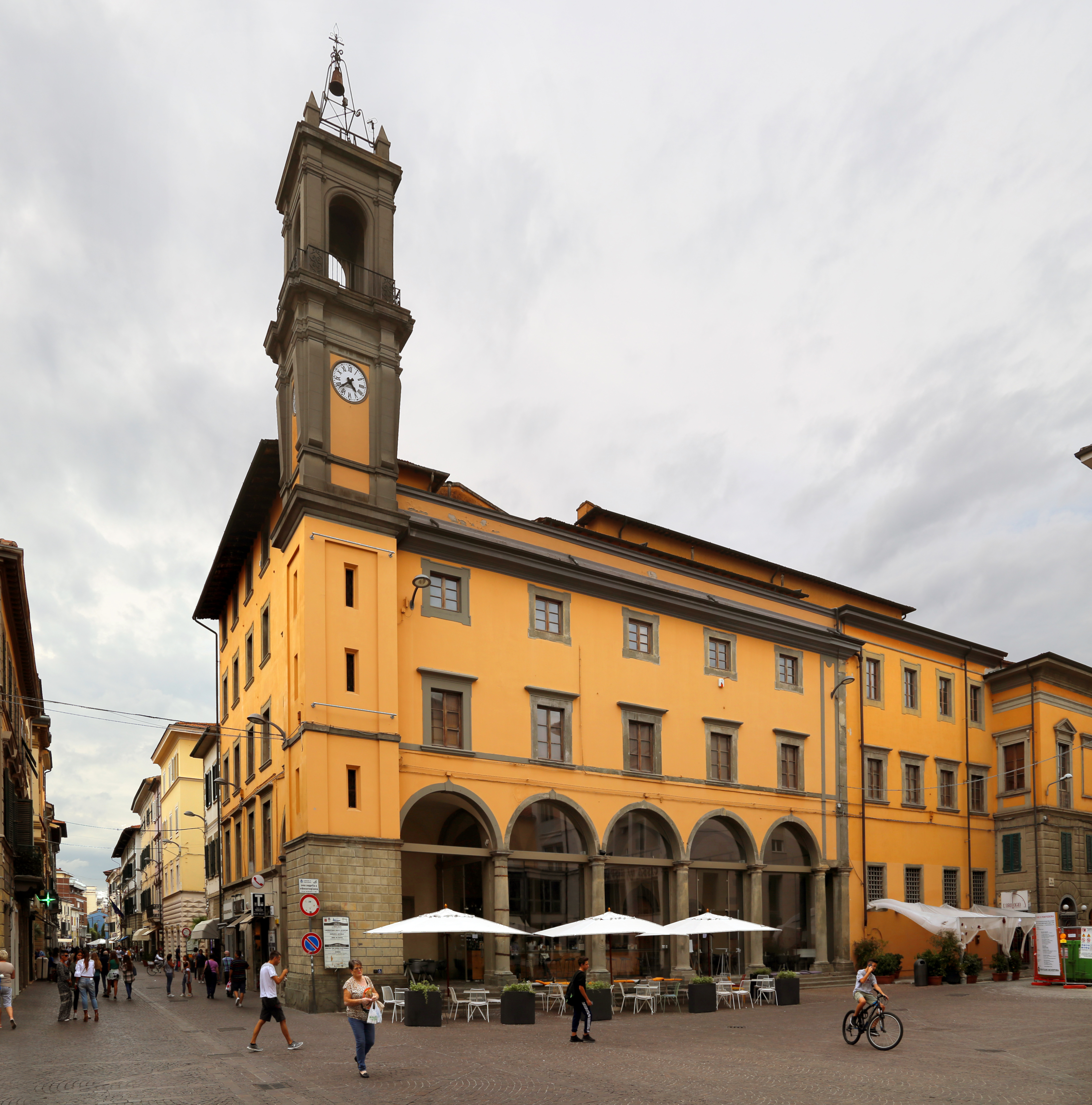
- Palazzo Pretorio (PALP)

- Coat of arms

- Location within Italy Location within Tuscany
- Coordinates: 43°39′45″N 10°37′58″E
- Country: Italy
- Region: Tuscany
- Province: Pisa (PI)
- Frazioni: Gello, Il Romito, La Borra, La Rotta, Montecastello, Pardossi, Santa Lucia, Treggiaia

Government
  - Mayor: Matteo Franconi, (since May 2019) (PD)

Area
  - Total: 45.89 km^{2} (17.72 sq mi)
- Elevation: 14 m (46 ft)

Population (31 December 2020)
  - Total: 29,270
  - Density: 637.8/km^{2} (1,652/sq mi)
- Demonym: Pontaderesi (those who were born there) Pontederesi (those who live there)
- Time zone: UTC+1 (CET)
  - Summer (DST): UTC+2 (CEST)
- Postal code: 56025
- Dialing code: 0587
- ISTAT code: 050029
- Patron saint: San Faustino
- Saint day: October 10
- Website: Official website

Pontedera (Italian: [ponteˈdɛːra]; Latin: Pons Herae) is an Italian comune with a population of 30,070, located in the province of Pisa, Tuscany, central Italy.

The town is located 20 km (12 miles) from Pisa and 50 km (31 miles) from Florence.

It houses the headquarters of the Piaggio company, the Castellani winery and the Amedei premium artisan chocolate factory.

Pontedera is in the Arno Valley at the confluence of the Era River and the Arno River. Its territory is also crossed by the Scolmatore dell'Arno canal, and by the Roglio, a tributary of the Era. There is also a small lake, in the frazione of La Rotta, known as Braccini lake.

The football team in the town is called U.S. Città di Pontedera, and they currently play in Serie C. Another notable attraction is the church of Santissimo Crocifisso, and the Duomo of Pontedera.

== History ==
Pontedera was the seat of several historical battles. In 1369, the Milanese army of Barnabò Visconti, led by John Hawkwood, was defeated here by the Florentine troops. On 11 June 1554, there was a pyrrhic victory in the last effort by the Republic of Siena to retain its independence, when Piero Strozzi won against the Florentines. Two months later he was decisively defeated at the Battle of Marciano, an event which marked the end of the Senese independence.

=== World War II ===
Pontedera was heavily bombed during World War II by the Anglo-Americans because of the presence of military aircraft manufacturing plants by Piaggio. The three main bombings occurred on 6 January 1944, when the station area was hit; on 18 January, when the open-air area of the "Orto dei Rosati" was targeted (and where people had taken refuge believing it to be safe); and on 21 January 1944, when factories and houses were hit. By the end of the conflict, half the city was devastated, 370 people had lost their lives and thousands had been injured.

== Geography ==
=== Territory ===
- Seismic classification: Zone 3 (medium-low seismicity (PGA between 0.05 and 0.15 g)), Civil Protection Department seismic classification as April 2021.

=== Frazioni ===
Gello, Il Romito, La Borra, La Rotta, Montecastello, Pardossi, Santa Lucia, Treggiaia

=== Climate ===
The average annual temperature is 18.60°C (65,48°F). In summer months, temperatures can reach as high as 40°C (104°F), while in winter months sunrise temperatures can be below freezing.

== Education ==
Pontedera boasts great secondary schools in Tuscany, located in an urban area called "Villaggio Scolastico" (school village).

=== Secondary education ===
==== Liceo "XXV Aprile" ====
which is divided into two addresses:

- Liceo Classico (classical lyceum)
- Liceo Scientifico (scientific lyceum)

==== ITIS "Guglielmo Marconi" ====
with four branches of study in the technology sector:

- Mechanics, Mechatronics and Energy
- Electronics and Electrical Engineering ("Electronics" articulation with "Robotics" curvature)
- IT and Telecommunications
- Graphics and Communication

and a high school address of study:

- High school of Science - Applied Science option

==== ITGC "Enrico Fermi" ====
Source:

==== Istituto "Eugenio Montale" ====
- Liceo Linguistico (Linguistic lyceum)
- Liceo delle Scienze Umane e Economico Sociale (Human Sciences lyceum)

==== IPSIA "Antonio Pacinotti" ====
Source:

=== Primary and Lower secondary education ===
- Istituto comprensivo "Curtatone e Montanara"
- Istituto comprensivo "Mohandas Karamchand Gandhi"
- Istituto comprensivo "Antonio Pacinotti"

=== University ===
- Polo Sant'Anna Valdera
- Polo Didattico Universitario Daniela Donati dell'Università di Pisa, including:
  - Corso di scienze infermieristiche (nursing science)
  - Segreteria studenti di Pontedera (Student secretariat Pontedera)

== Culture ==
Pontedera is home to the "Giovanni Alberto Agnelli" Piaggio Museum. Created in 2000 from part of the old Piaggio workshops, it now houses numerous models produced by Piaggio as well as a vast historical archive named after Antonella Bechi Piaggio, while the Valdera Campus of the Sant'Anna School of Advanced Studies in Pisa was carved out of the old Piaggio canteen.

== Infrastructure and transportation ==
=== Roads ===
Pontedera is crossed from west to east by State Road 67 Tosco Romagnola, which connects it directly to Pisa and Florence ending in Ravenna.

The city is also served by the FI-PI-LI Great Communication Road, which serves as a major arterial road connecting the provinces of Florence, Pisa and Livorno. The road starts in Florence and splits near Lavaiano into the northern section, ending in Pisa connecting with the A12 Motorway, and the southern section, ending in Livorno.

=== Bus ===
Urban public bus transportation is operated by Autolinee Toscane (CTT Nord before the merger of activities in 2021) with two paid urban routes (previously three) and two free shuttle services.

There are suburban lines connecting it with a variety of Tuscan cities.

=== Railway ===
Pontedera train station is an important hub placed on the Leopolda Railway between Pisa and Florence, due to the many services in the Valdera area, in the field of education and the piaggio factories, with a daily flow of 4,000 passengers. The station is served by trains about every 15 minutes in both directions, as well as various connections including Livorno, Viareggio, La Spezia, Lucca, Grosseto to other minor ones, that are part of the Trenitalia regional service. It takes 10–15 minutes to travel to Pisa and 35–40 minutes to travel to Florence.

In the early 20th century the Lucca-Pontedera-Saline di Volterra railway line was planned. In 1922 work began, ending six years later only on the Lucca-Pontedera section. Due to damage in World War II, the line was decommissioned and dismantled in 1958.

=== Airport ===
Pontedera had an airport, which was created for military use as an airfield for airships and later repurposed for aircraft in built in 1913, on the eve of World War I.

After World War II it lost importance because of the nearby Pisa airport. The same passed into use by Piaggio until it was completely dismantled. In its original place today stands the new Pontedera industrial zone (PIP III).

== Anthropogenic geography ==
=== Neighborhoods ===
==== Centro ====
Extending westward to the railway station, it's bounded on the north by the Arno river, on the east by the Era river, and on the south by the railway.

The main pedestrian street is Corso Matteotti, home to stores, bars, bakeries and businesses. Other main streets are Via Gotti, Via Lotti, Via Roma and Via I° Maggio. In the 2007 municipal census, the neighborhood had 7943 inhabitants.

==== Bellaria ====
It is the area south of the railway. It is home to the headquarters of Piaggio, its museum, the Polo Valdera, and the "Felice Lotti" hospital.

The residential area consists mainly of small villas. The newly developed western area can be divided into Sozzifanti to the north and Galimberti to the south. The former is the only area in all of Pontedera that does not have its own church. In the 2007 municipal census, the neighborhood had 4648 inhabitants.

==== Oltrera ====
It is the area east of the town. It is the neighborhood across the Era River; It's also called in Pisan dialect "Foriderponte" or "Forderponte" (outside of the bridge).

It has seen an extensive expansion from the late 1950s with the construction of the "Gronchi" Village - Viale Italia. Today it is home to the weekly market, annual Fair, Era Theater, "Ettore Mannucci" stadium and the Cineplex, a multiplex cinema with a shopping center inside. In the 2007 municipal census it had 6779 inhabitants.

==== Villaggi ====
The Villaggio Piaggio (Piaggio Village) neighborhood was built by Piaggio for its employees and inside it contains all the necessary infrastructures to be autonomous.

Another one is the Antonio Gramsci communal village, which is developed north of the railway east of the Villaggio Piaggio.

== Notable people ==
- Jerzy Grotowski, Polish theatre director and theorist who spent the last 13 years of his life in Pontedera
- Fabio Innocenti, volleyball player
- Fabiana Luperini, cyclist
