= Felipe Romito =

Argentine singer (1893–1962)

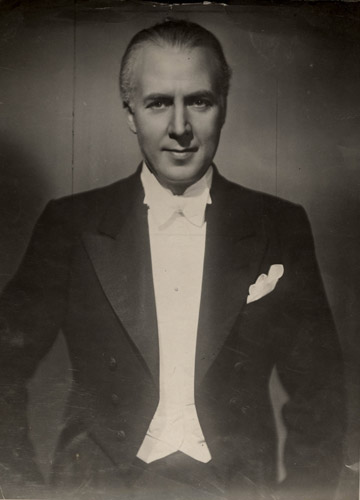
- Born: 25 March 1893; Rosario, Santa Fe, Argentina
- Died: 1 March 1962 (aged 68)
- Occupation: Singer

Felipe Romito (1893-1962) was an Argentine singer who sung in a bass-baritone voice. He appeared in the 1941 film White Eagle, his only screen performance.

== Bibliography ==
- Hurtado, María Elena. Acario: el músico mágico. RIL Editores, 2009.
