= Romiti =

Romiti is a surname of Italian origin. Notable people with the surname include:

- Cesare Romiti (1923–2020), Italian economist and businessman
- Gino Romiti (1881–1967), Italian painter, active in Livorno
