= Il Romito =

- Frazione
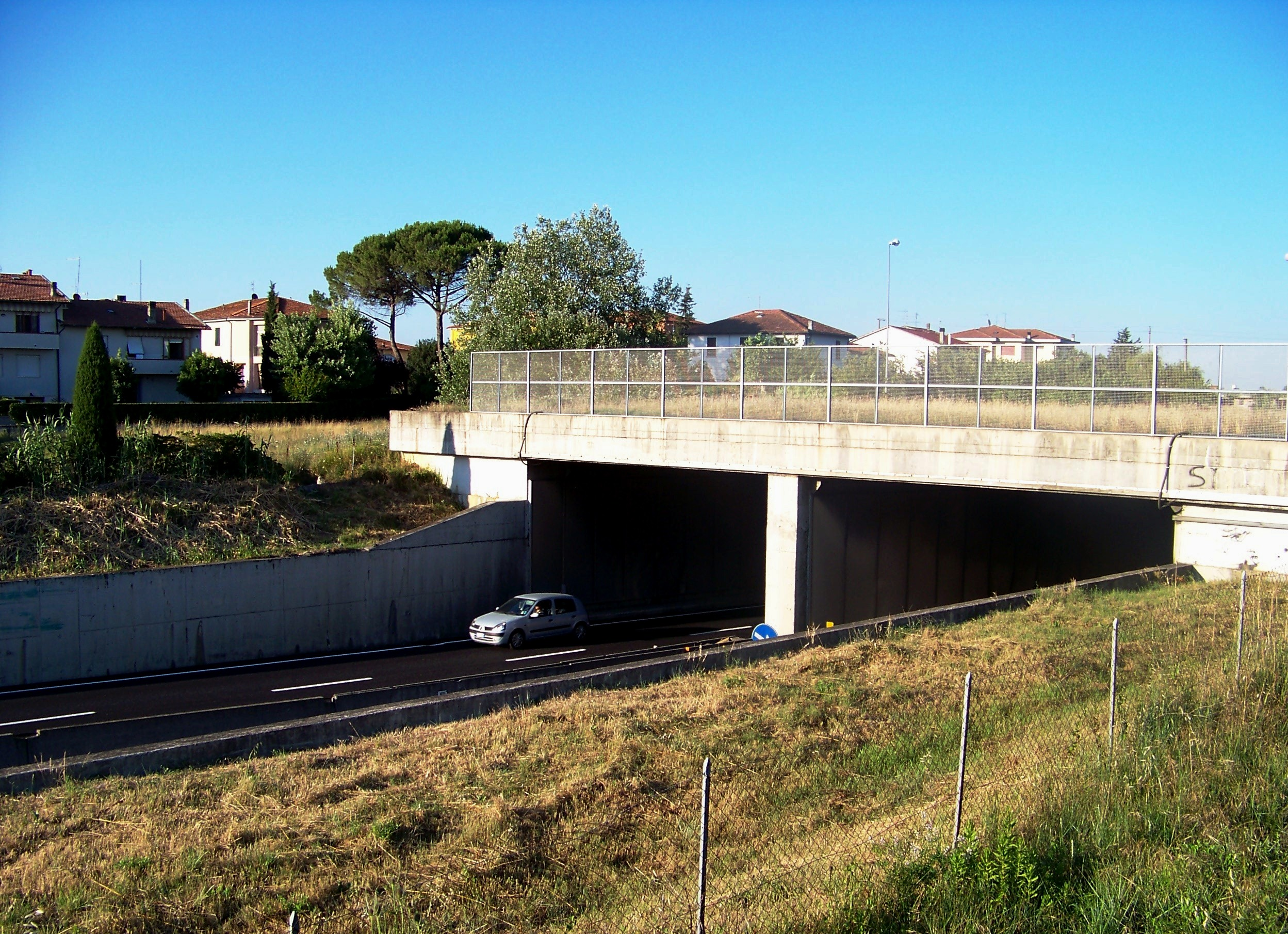

- Location of Il Romito in Italy
- Coordinates: 43°38′55″N 10°38′43″E
- Country: Italy
- Region: Tuscany
- Province: Pisa (PI)
- Comune: Pontedera
- Elevation: 23 m (75 ft)

Population (2011)
  - Total: 1,197
- Time zone: UTC+1 (CET)
  - Summer (DST): UTC+2 (CEST)
- Postal code: 56025
- Dialing code: (+39) 0587

Il Romito is a village in Tuscany, central Italy, administratively a frazione of the comune of Pontedera, province of Pisa. At the time of the 2001 census its population was 1,111.

Il Romito is about 28 km from Pisa and 2 km from Pontedera.
