= Saline di Volterra =

- Frazione
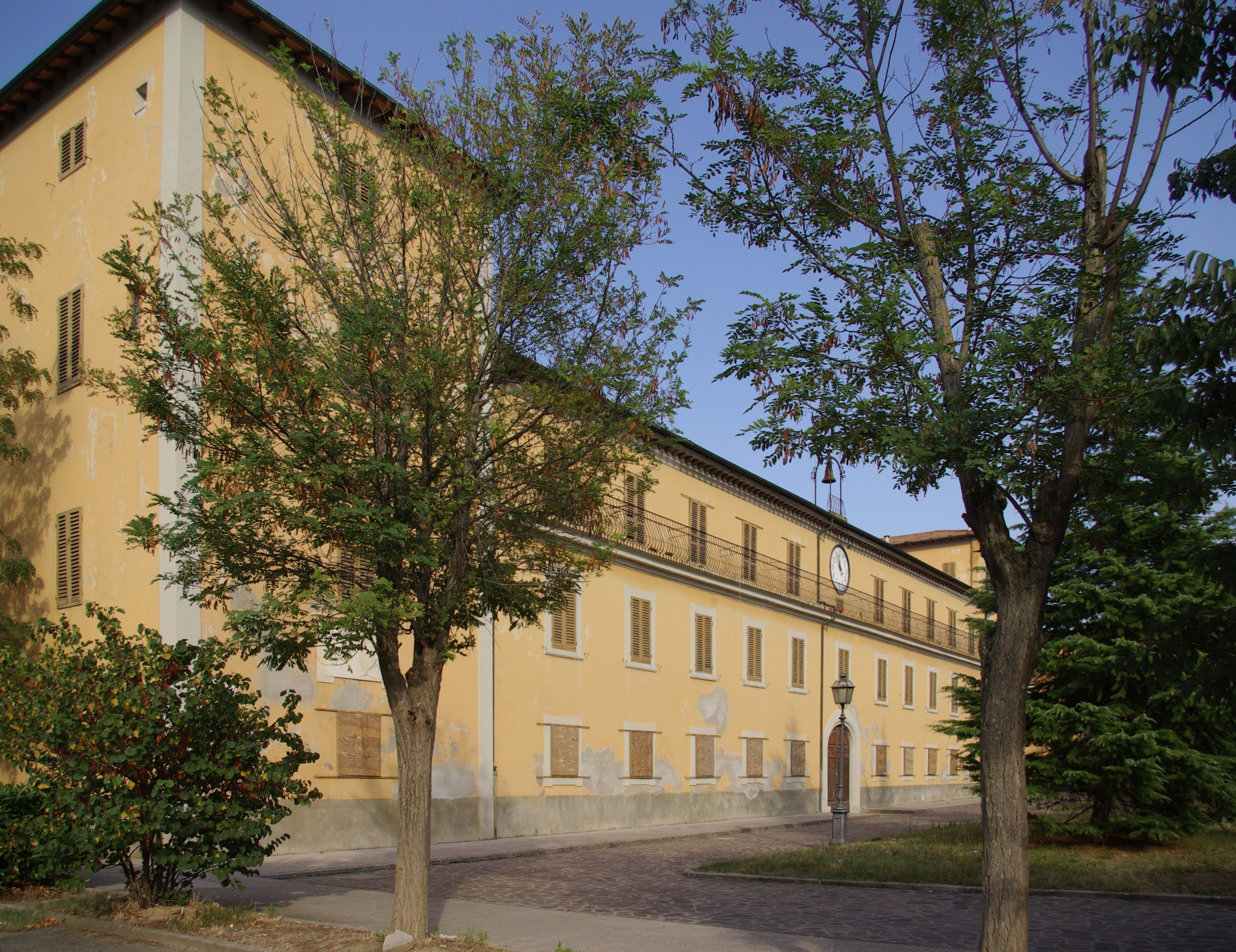
- Palazzo dell'Orologio

- Location of Saline di Volterra in Italy
- Coordinates: 43°21′42″N 10°48′48″E
- Country: Italy
- Region: Tuscany
- Province: Pisa (PI)
- Comune: Volterra
- Elevation: 71 m (233 ft)

Population (2011)
  - Total: 1,143
- Demonym: Salinesi
- Time zone: UTC+1 (CET)
  - Summer (DST): UTC+2 (CEST)
- Postal code: 56048
- Dialing code: (+39) 0588

Saline di Volterra is a village in Tuscany, central Italy, administratively a frazione of the comune of Volterra, province of Pisa. At the time of the 2001 census its population was 1,218. Ten years later it was down to 1,143.

== Sights ==
The main tourist attraction in the area are the saltworks, particularly the pavilion designed by Pier Luigi Nervi, which houses the "Salt Waterfall." Inside the saltworks, there is a museum dedicated to the history of salt extraction in Tuscany.
