= MOBIpeople =

Portuguese manufacturer of buses and coaches

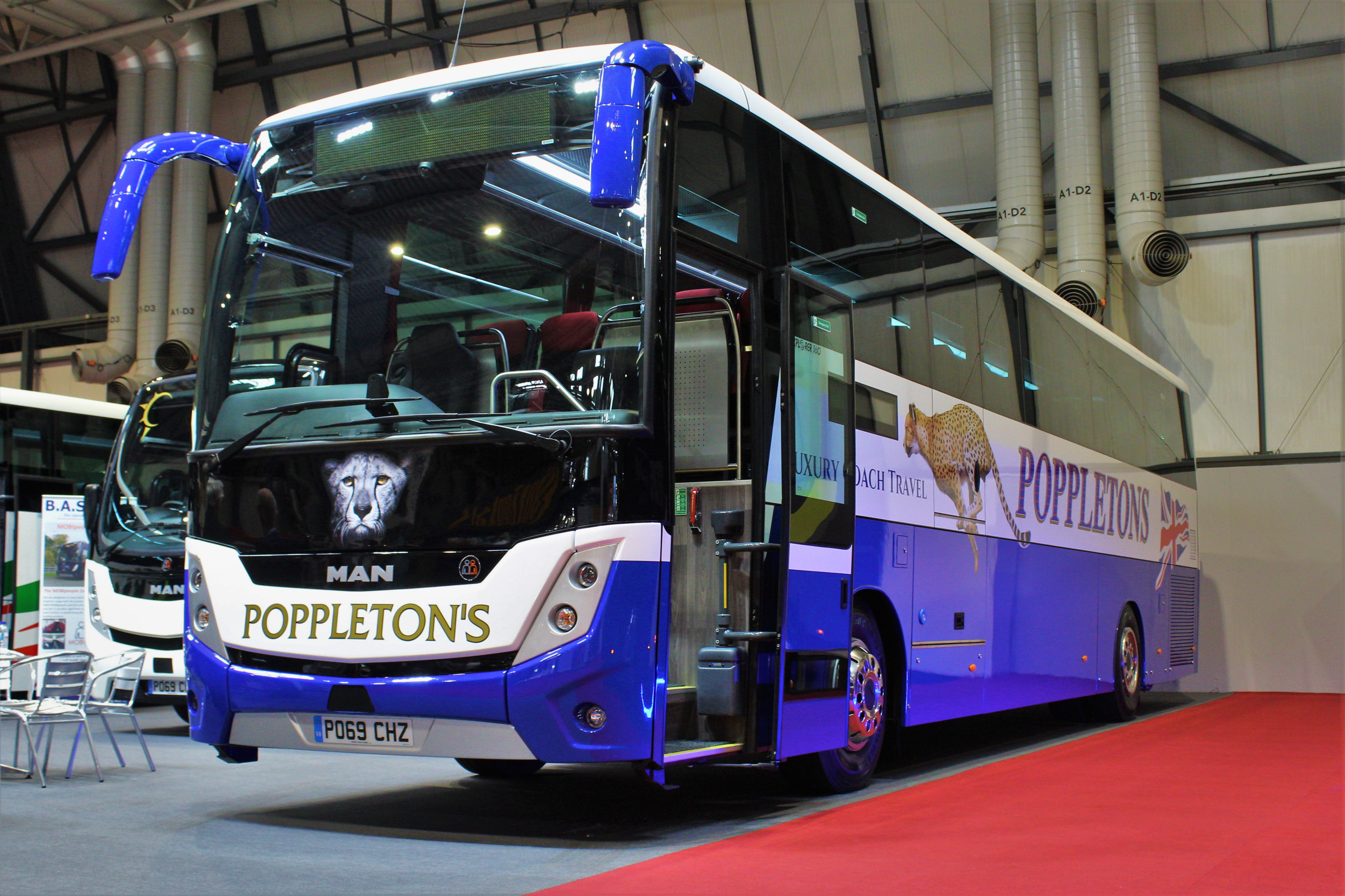
- A 2019 MOBIpeople Explorer 360
- Company type: Sociedade Anónima (S.A.)
- Industry: Commercial vehicles
- Founded: February 2008
- Headquarters: Coimbra, Portugal
- Key people: António Catarino (CEO)
- Products: Buses and coaches
- Revenue: €6.2 million (2019)
- Number of employees: 75 (2019)
- Website: www.mobipeople.pt/en/home/

MOBIpeople is a bus and coach manufacturer based in Coimbra, Portugal. The company was founded in 2008 and primarily produces minibuses, midibuses and their coach equivalents. MOBIpeople is the third largest Portuguese bus manufacturer after CaetanoBus and Carroçarias Irmãos Mota. It occupies the space of the former Marcopolo bus factory in Coimbra.

MOBIpeople has seen strong import sales in the United Kingdom in the late 2010s and early 2020s, following an import partnership with BASE Coach Sales of Preston which commenced in 2014.

== History ==
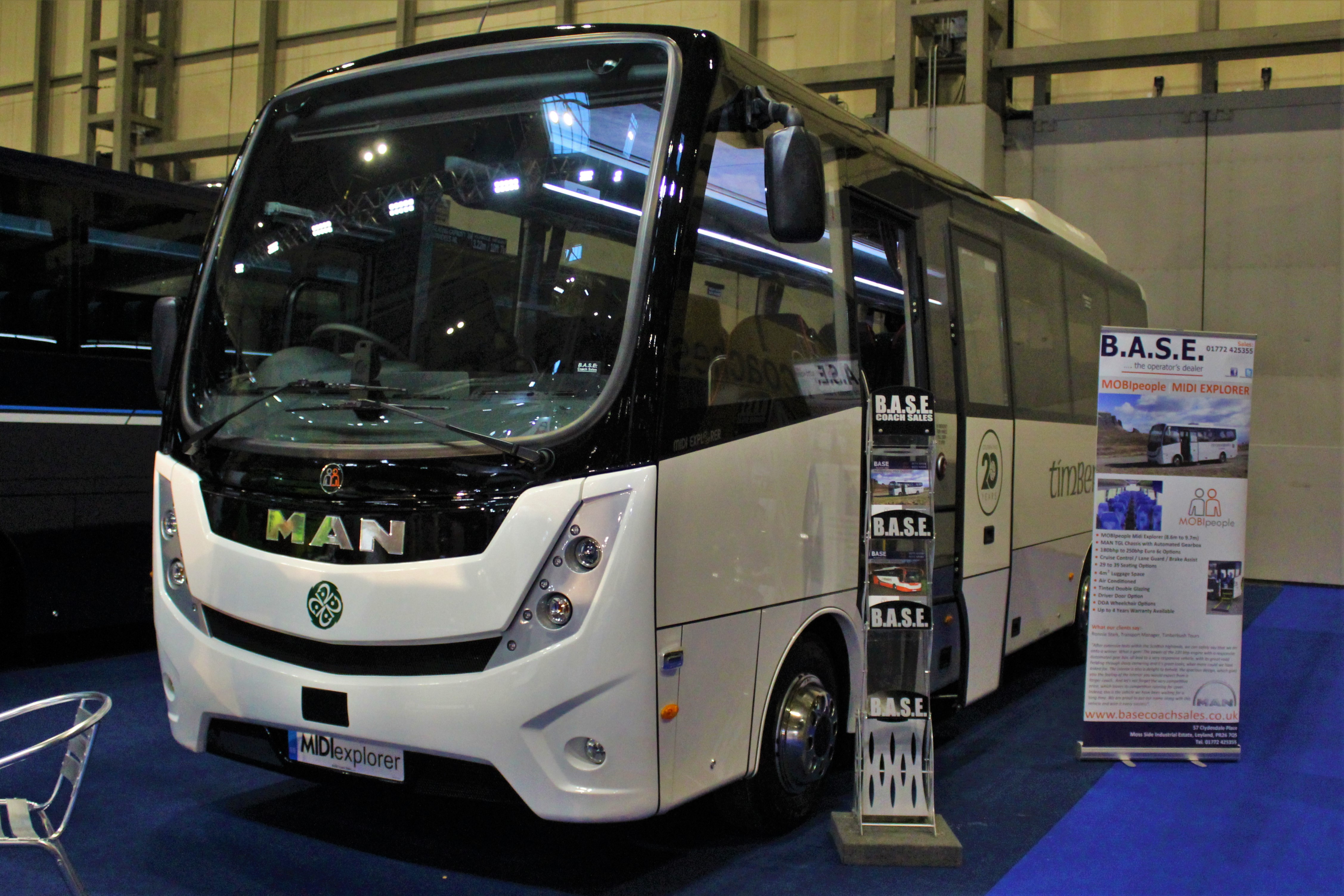
One of the first models, a MOBIpeople Midi-Explorer on MAN TGL chassis

MOBIpeople was founded in Coimbra in February 2008 by chief executive officer António Catarino and directors Paula Matos, Nuno Mendes and Alexandre Meireles, initially as a company providing bus repairs before moving into bus manufacturing. All four of the partners who founded MOBIpeople had previously worked at the Marcopolo bus factory in Coimbra before it closed down during the 2000s. MOBIpeople were initially based out of a small workshop in the Adémia area of Coimbra.

The first export sales for MOBIpeople were rugged MOBIpeople Tropic off-road bodies which were exported to Angola. In 2009, the MOBIpeople Junior minibus model was introduced, and sales in Belgium, France, Iceland and the Netherlands followed.

The Government of Bermuda ordered 21 MOBIpeople City-bodied MAN NLxx3F low-floor city buses for the island's transportation department in 2014, marking one of MOBIpeople's first overseas contracts. A second batch of four similar vehicles was ordered and delivered to Bermuda in 2018, with improvements based on feedback from the first batch of vehicles including an increase in the seated passenger capacity by one to 39.

In 2014, MOBIpeople signed a deal with BASE Coach Sales, a subsidiary of Holmeswood Coaches of Preston, for the supply of vehicles to the British market; MOBIpeople would manufacture vehicles to order, which would be marketed and sold to operators in the United Kingdom by BASE Coach Sales. BASE were already an established importer and reseller of coaches, having previously partnered with Barbi, Beulas, Marcopolo and Tata Hispano. By 2019, the British market made up 60% of MOBIpeople's entire sales volume.

By 2019, MOBIpeople had grown to have 75 employees working at their new 3,400 square metres (37,000 ft^{2}) factory located in the Souselas industrial area of Coimbra. The company had an annual turnover of €6.2 million, more than 75% of which was generated by exports.

== Products ==
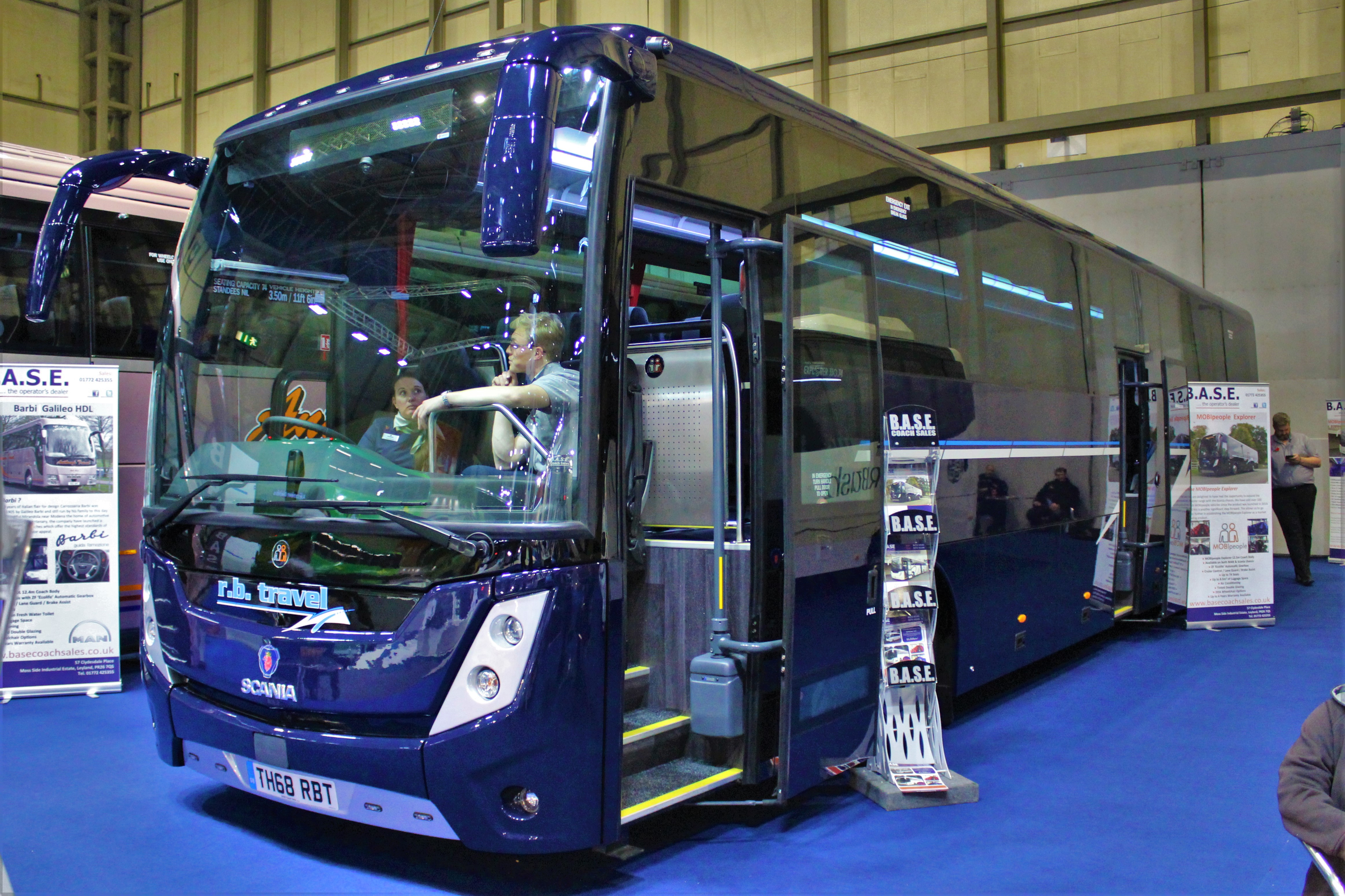
A MOBIpeople Explorer 330 on Scania K320IB chassis on display at the 2018 Euro Bus Expo

As of 2022, MOBIpeople construct the following models:

- 9T and 9T-PMR – minibus bodywork for the European market on Fiat Ducato, Ford Transit, Iveco Daily and Mercedes-Benz Sprinter chassis
- City – low-floor bus bodywork for the European market on MAN NLxx3F chassis
- Explorer – full-size coach bodywork for the United Kingdom on MAN Lion's Chassis and Scania K series chassis
- Explorer Nordic – full-size coach bodywork for Northern Europe on Mercedes-Benz Atego and Scania K series chassis
- Hybridus – hybrid midibus for the European market on Mitsubishi Fuso Canter chassis
- Junior – minicoach bodywork for the European market on Iveco Daily chassis
- Midi-Explorer – midicoach bodywork for the United Kingdom on Iveco Daily, MAN TGL or Mercedes-Benz Atego chassis
- Mini-Bus and Mini-Bus-PMR – mini school bus bodywork for the European market on Iveco Daily, Mercedes-Benz Sprinter, Renault Master and Volkswagen Crafter chassis
- Premium – luxury coach for the United Kingdom on MAN Lion's Chassis
- Tropic – full-size coach bodywork for developing markets on DAF, Iveco, MAN, Mercedes-Benz, Renault, Scania and Volvo chassis
- Tropic Tour – midicoach bodywork for developing markets on DAF, Iveco, MAN, Mercedes-Benz, Renault, Scania and Volvo chassis

The 12.5 metres (41 ft)-long MOBIpeople Explorer on Scania K series chassis was introduced at the Euro Bus Expo at the National Exhibition Centre in Birmingham, England in 2018; it is aimed primarily at the school bus market, and can be fitted with up to 74 seats in this role. The MOBIpeople Explorer, Midi-Explorer and Premium are sold in the United Kingdom through importer BASE Coach Sales. By June 2022, more than 200 MOBIpeople vehicles of all three models had been imported into the United Kingdom.

The MOBIpeople Premium was launched in 2020 as the company's first luxury product aimed at the touring coach market. The product was directly commissioned by BASE Coach Sales for the British market, following the cessation of production of the Barbi Galileo, a coach which BASE had previously imported to the United Kingdom. The first Premium was delivered to Anthony's Travel in late 2020.

== See also ==
- Salvador Caetano
