= DAF SB220 =

Full-size single-decker bus chassis produced by DAF Bus International

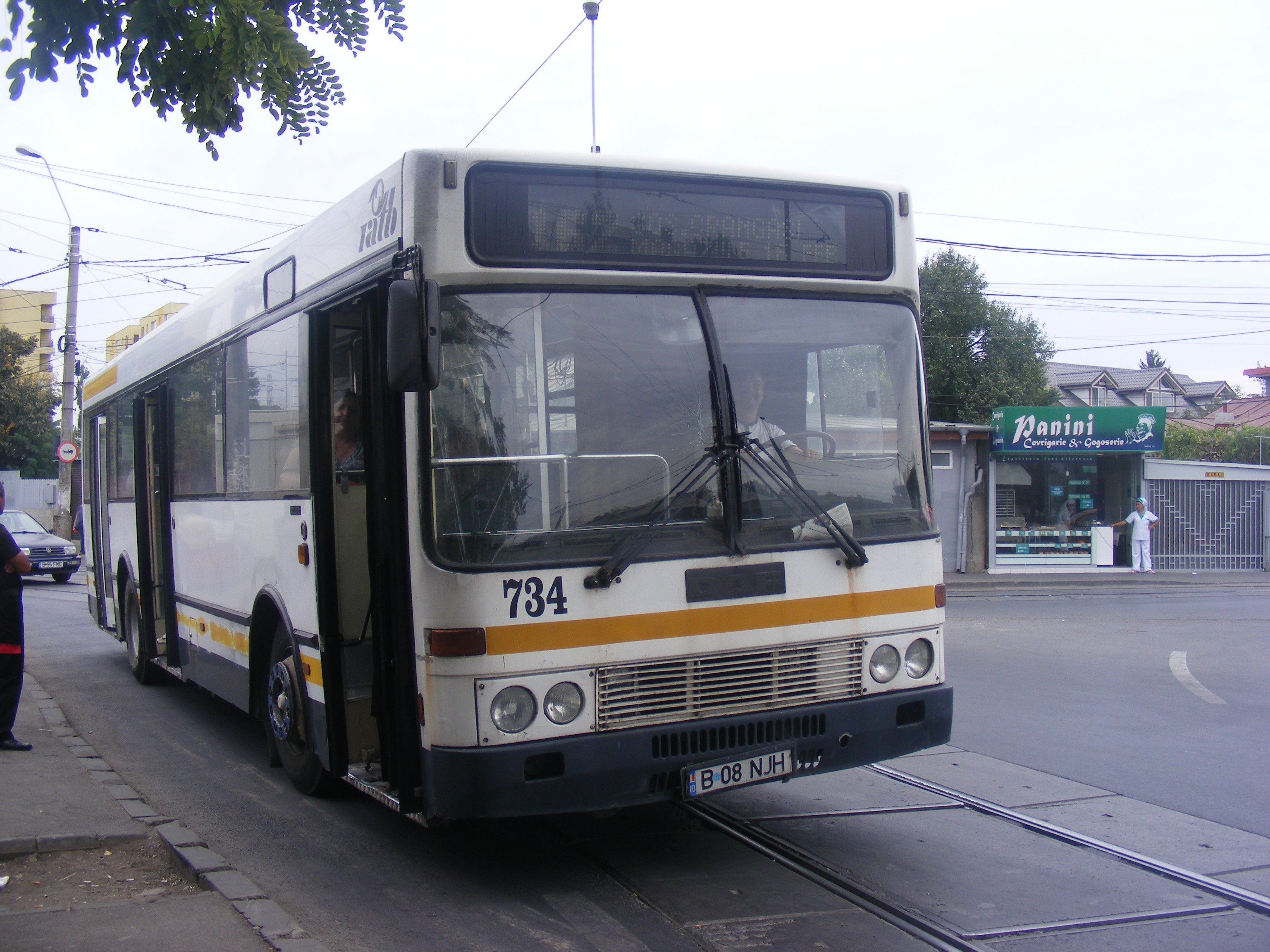
- RATB DAF SB220 in Bucharest, Romania, several months before its withdrawal in 2012. The bus is fitted with a Hispano LT550 bodywork, and was the last one of its kind to be withdrawn.

Overview
- Manufacturer: DAF
- Production: 1985 -
- Assembly: Eindhoven, Netherlands

Body and chassis
- Doors: 1 or 2
- Floor type: Step entrance Low floor Low entry

Powertrain
- Engine: DAF GS160M
- Power output: 218 horsepower
- Transmission: ZF Ecomat 4HP 500 4-speed Voith DIWA 851.2

Dimensions
- Length: 11.3 or 12.0 m (37 ft 1 in or 39 ft 4 in)
- Width: 2.55 m (8 ft 4 in)
- Height: 3.04 m (10 ft 0 in)

Chronology
- Successor: DAF/VDL SB200; VDL SB250

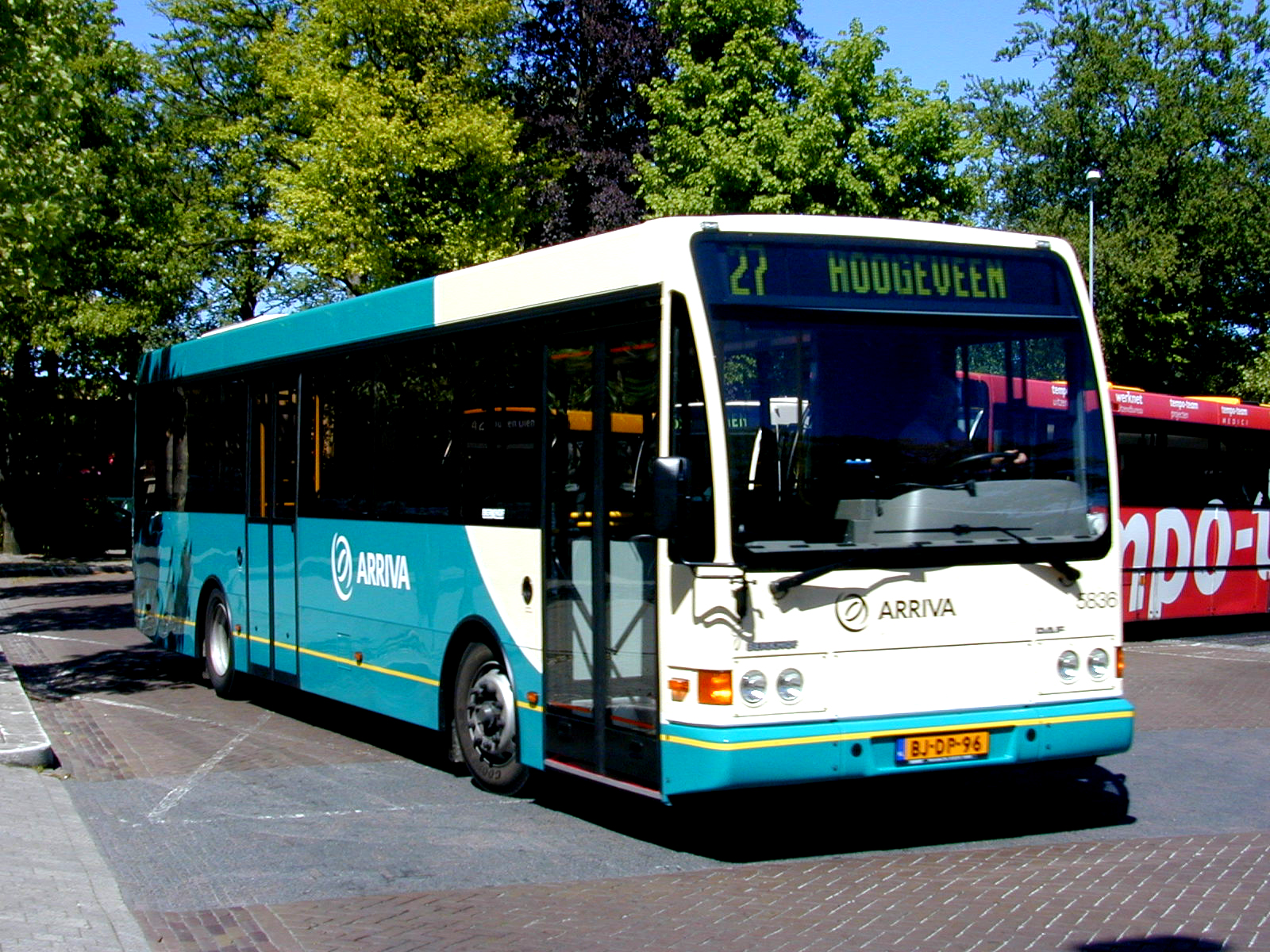
Arriva Netherlands Berkhof 2000NL bodied SB220 in May 2000

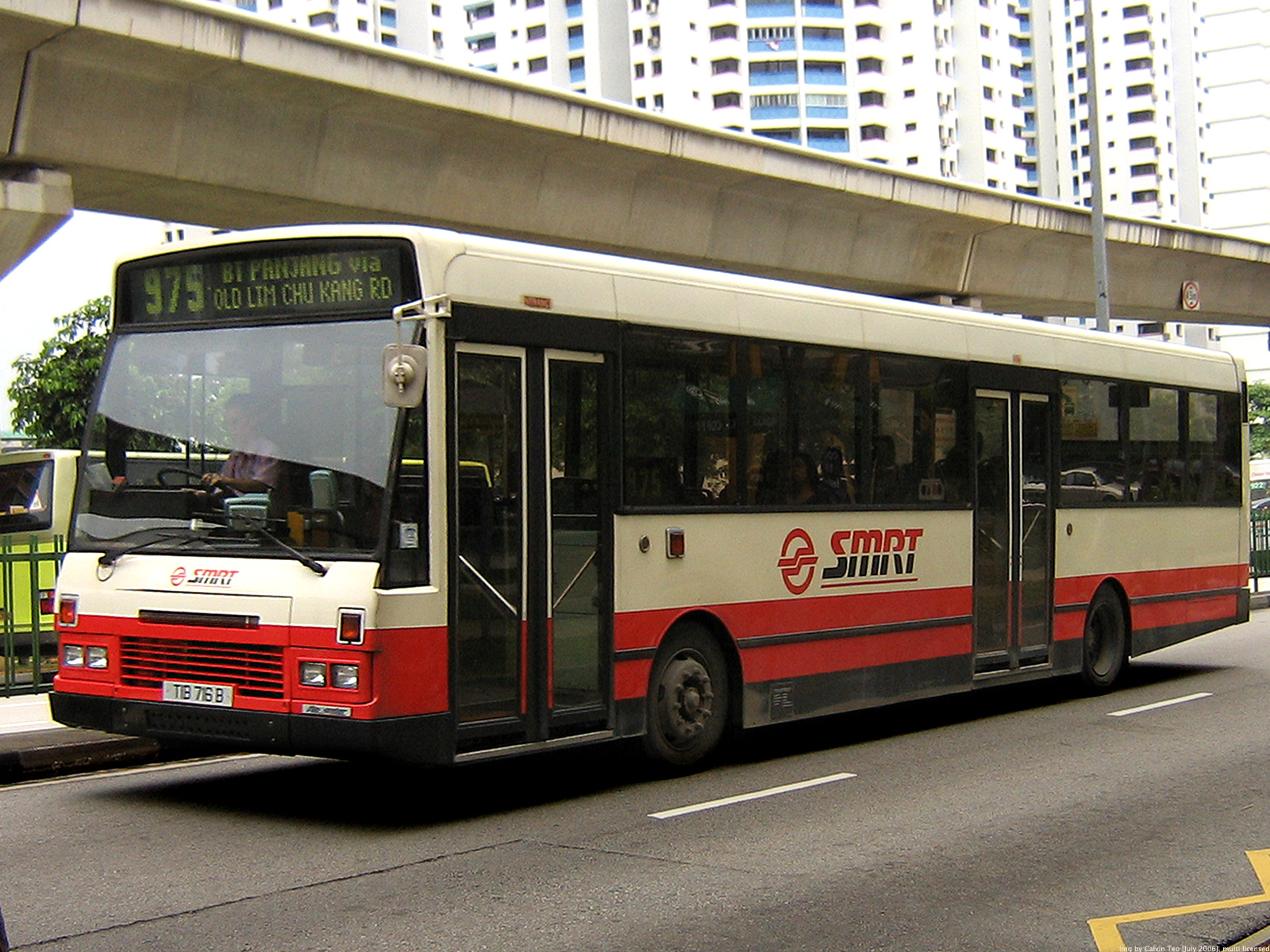
SMRT Buses Alexander Setanta bodied step entrance SB220LT in Singapore in July 2006

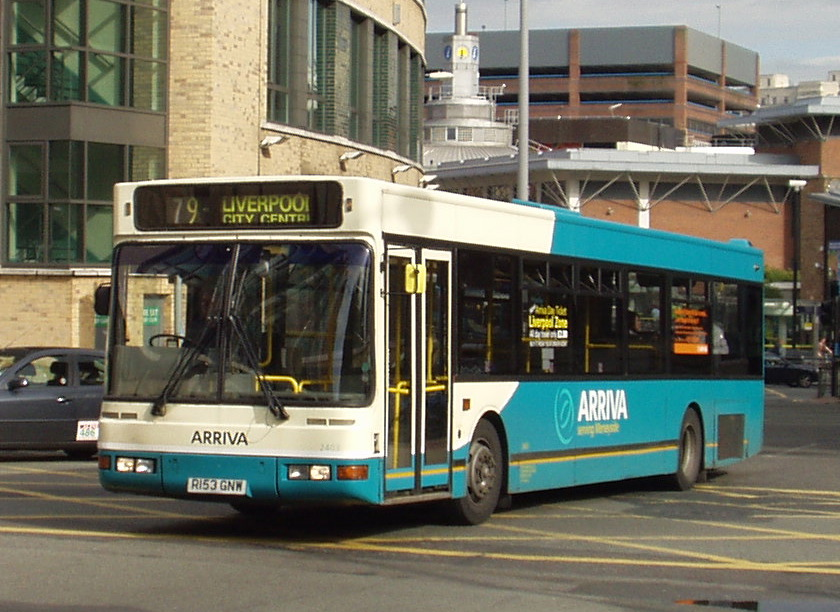
Arriva North West Plaxton Prestige bodied SB220 in Liverpool in July 2007

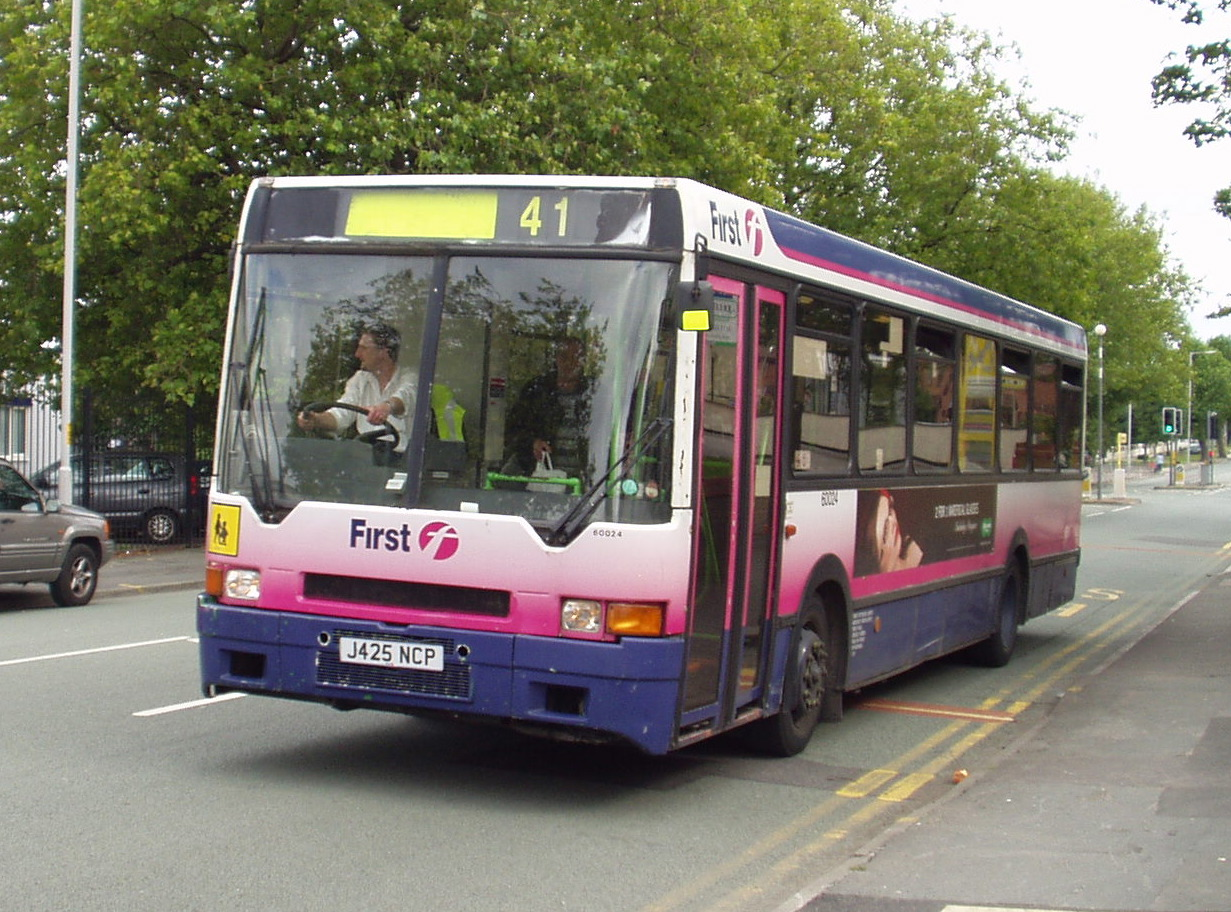
First Chester & The Wirral Ikarus bodied SB220 in Rock Ferry in August 2007

The DAF SB220 was a full-size single-decker bus chassis produced by DAF Bus International from 1985. Initially only built in left hand drive, in 1988 a right hand drive version was launched for the United Kingdom market. An articulated version was also manufactured.

It was superseded by the DAF/VDL SB200 and SB250.

== Types ==
- Step entrance
- Low floor
- Low entry

== Bodywork ==
Makes and models of bodywork were fitted to the SB220 full-size single-decker bus chassis include the following:

=== United Kingdom (step entrance) ===
- Ikarus Citibus
- Northern Counties Paladin
- Optare Delta

=== United Kingdom (low floor/low entry) ===
- Alexander ALX300
- East Lancs Myllennium
- Ikarus Polaris
- Ikarus 481
- Plaxton Prestige / Northern Counties Paladin LF

=== Ireland (step entrance) ===
- Alexander Setanta
- Plaxton Verde

=== Netherlands (step entrance) ===
- Berkhof ST2000NL
- Den Oudsten B88
- Den Oudsten B89 Alliance

=== Portugal (step entrance) ===
- CAMO Camus
- CAMO Cronus (Only 2 units of the "standard" version of this bodywork were produced, and both used the SB220 chassis)
- Marcopolo Allegro

=== Spain (step entrance) ===
- Castrosua CS 40 City
- Hispano Carrocera VOV
- Ugarte U-2000
- Unicar U-90

=== Singapore (step entrance) ===
- Walter Alexander Setanta (One such vehicle had its front replaced with one from Hispano Carrocera, all were eventually retired in late-2016.)
- Hispano Carrocera (Some vehicles were moved to CSS operations in 1997, while others were sold abroad to New Zealand and the United Kingdom. The ones remaining under CSS were eventually retired in 2004.)

All these buses are powered by a DAF LT 160L engine (11,627cc), which is Euro I compliant. All Hispano Carrocera SV220s were fitted with ZF Ecomat 4HP 500 4-speed gearbox. While Walter Alexander Setanta bodied SV220s were equipped with Voith DIWA 851.2 gearbox (earlier Hispano-bodied SV220 units).

=== Romania (step entrance) ===
- DAF SB 220-Castrosua (RATB Bucharest)
- DAF SB 220-Elvo (RATB Bucharest)
- DAF SB 220-Hispano Carocera (RATB Bucharest)
