= 343 (disambiguation) =

343 may refer to:

- 343, a year of the Christian or Common Era
- 343 BC, the year
- 343 (number), the integer represented by the English-language numeral "three hundred and forty-three"

== Vehicles ==
- Three Forty Three, a New York City fireboat
- Volvo 343, a small family car
- Fiat 343, a bus

== Other uses ==
- 343 Guilty Spark, a fictional character from the Halo franchise
- Halo Studios (formerly known as 343 Industries), a Microsoft video game studio responsible for the Halo franchise, named after this character
- Area code 343, a phone number area code for Ottawa, Ontario, Canada
- Highway 343, a list of highways numbered 343
- 343, a group of women behind the Manifesto of the 343
- Asteroid 343, see 343 Ostara
