= MAN Lion's =

MAN Lion's refers to various bus series by MAN.

- MAN Lion's Chassis
- MAN Lion's City
- MAN Lion's Intercity, a bus used by TPER in Italy
- MAN Lion's Coach
