= Fiat 306 =

Italian bus produced by Fiat Veicoli Industriali (1956-1982)

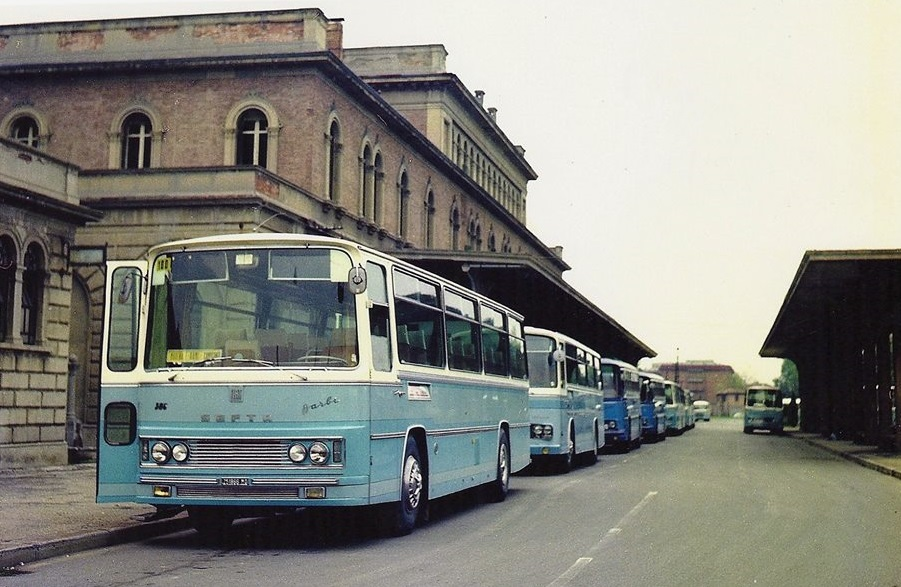
Fiat 306 Barbi in Modena, Italy

The Fiat 306 was an Italian bus produced by Fiat Veicoli Industriali (Fiat's bus division before the creation of the Iveco consortium) from 1956.

It was manufactured in 3 series: 306/2 was launched in 1960, while 306/3 was from 1962, with different car body. The Fiat 306 was delivered as a chassis, to which was later added a car body by different companies, including CANSA, Carrozzeria Orlandi, Carrozzeria Menarini, Carrozzeria Barbi, the Belgian Van Hool, and others. The Fiat 306, whose production ended in 1982, was massively used in Italy by numerous local transport administration. It was replaced by the Iveco 370, launched in 1977.

Its 6-cylinder inline diesel engine was installed "underfloor".
