= Iveco 370 =

Italian coach produced by Fiat Veicoli Industriali and then by IVECO

Fiat 370
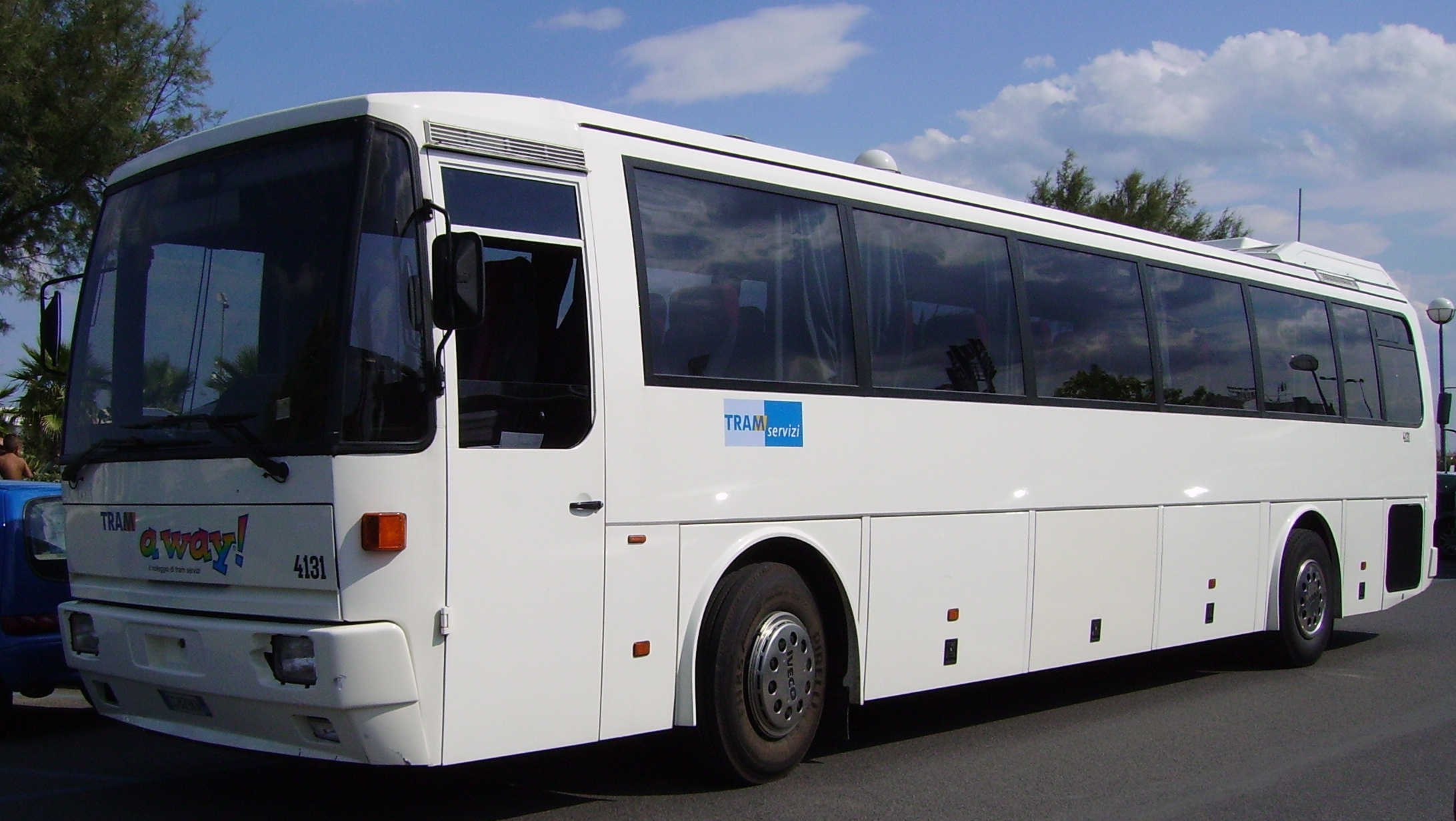
- An Iveco 370 of the Tram Servizi at Rimini

Overview
- Manufacturer: Italy Fiat Veicoli Industriali
- Model years: 1976 - 2007

Body and chassis
- Body style: Intercity, Tourism
- Doors: 2

Powertrain
- Engine: Iveco 8210.02 diesel 13798 cm³ 220 cv

Dimensions
- Length: 9 m (29.5 ft); 10 m (32.8 ft); 11 m (36.1 ft); 12 m (39.4 ft)
- Width: 2.5 m (8.2 ft)
- Height: 3.2 m (10.5 ft)
- Curb weight: 9,500 kg (20,900 lb); 12,000 kg (26,000 lb)

Chronology
- Predecessor: Fiat 343
- Successor: Iveco EuroClass

The Iveco 370 was an Italian coach produced by Fiat Veicoli Industriali starting from 1976, and, from 1980, by the Iveco consortium.

Produced in different lengths, it replaced the previous models Fiat 306, Fiat 308 and Fiat 309. It was built in two versions, suburban and Gran Turismo, in the length of 12 and 10.5 meters respectively, as well as a 9 m few units. The German-built Magirus M2000 was based on the Iveco 370.

There were eight possible engine configurations, varying from 9,572 cc, with 240 hp output, to 17,173 cc, with an output of 350 hp.

It was replaced by Iveco EuroClass since 1993, although the coach chassis was produced until 1999 for other coachbuilders.
