= City Shuttle Service =

Bus service network in Singapore

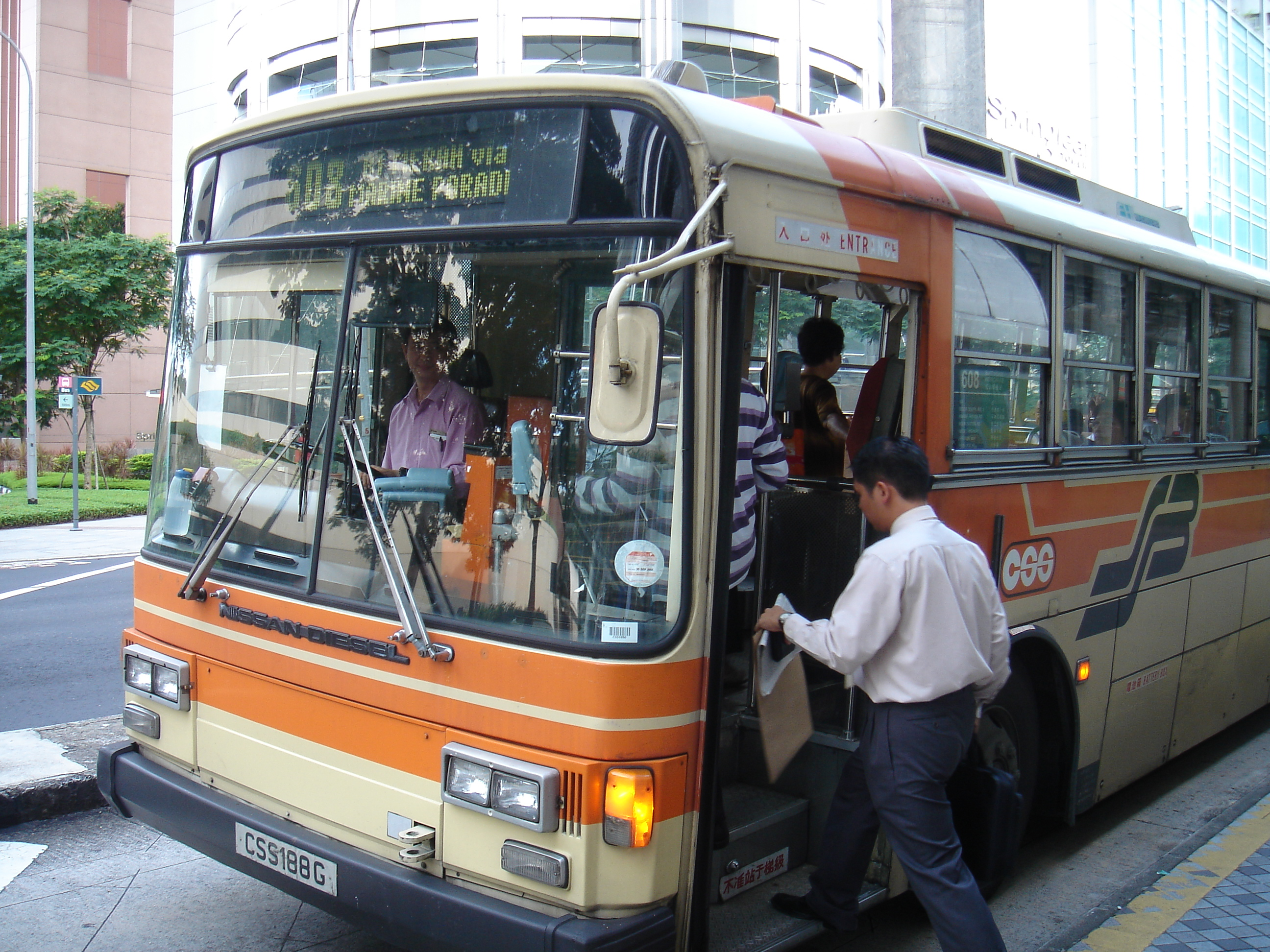
- Nissan Diesel U31RCN on route 608 at Anson Road in June 2005
- Founded: 16 May 1975; 49 years ago
- Defunct: 28 April 2007; 17 years ago
- Service type: Park & ride
- Routes: 12

The City Shuttle Service was a network of bus services in Singapore between May 1975 and April 2007 by NTUC Comfort and Singapore Shuttle Bus. It was purchased by Trans-Island Bus Services, a former subsidiary of Singapore Shuttle Bus, in 1987.

== History ==
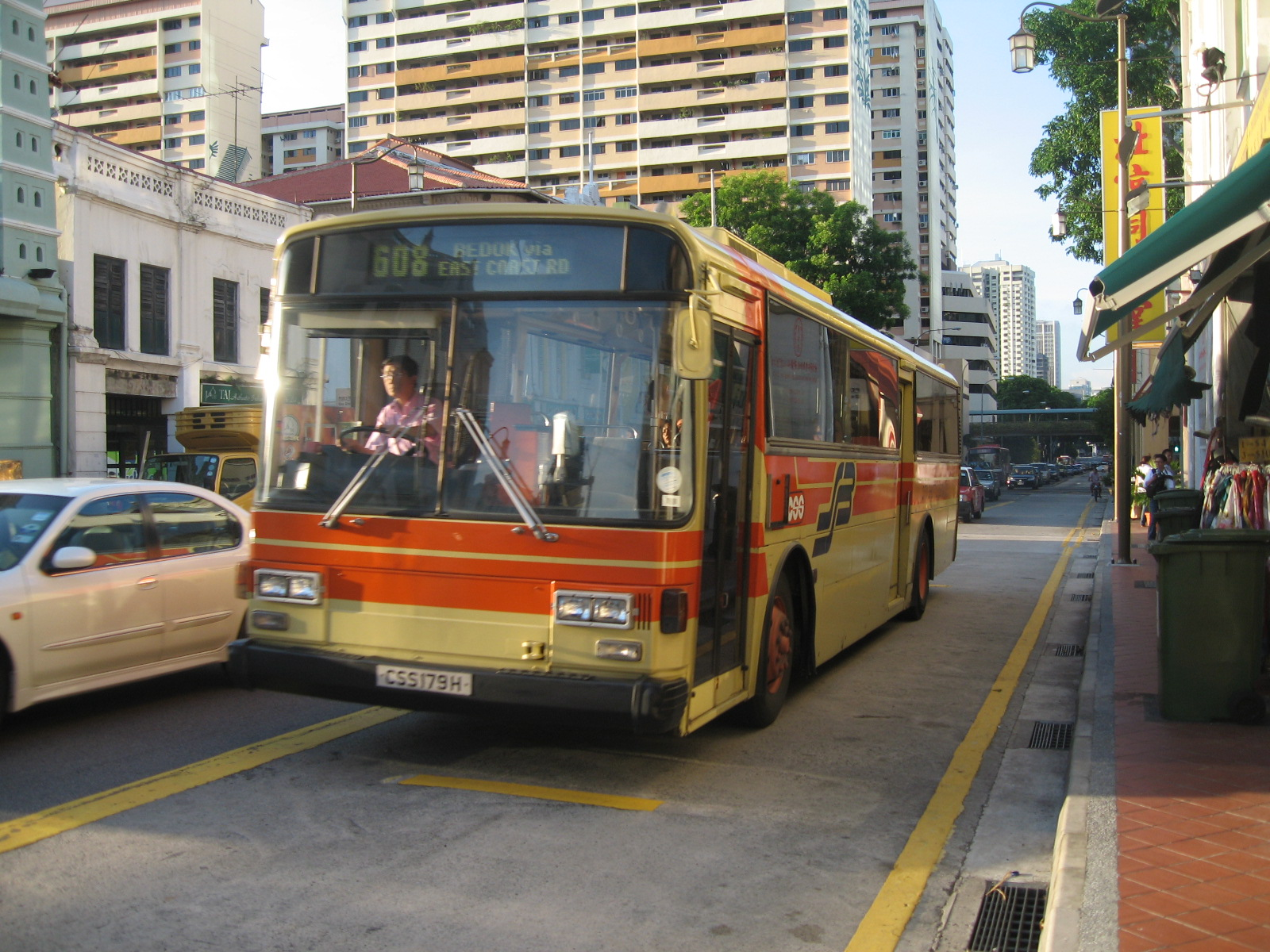
Nissan Diesel U31RCN on route 608 at South Bridge Road in May 2006

The City Shuttle Service (CSS) was an initiative introduced on 16 May 1975 by the Singapore government, as part of a park & ride scheme aimed at reducing traffic congestion in the city. It was originally hoped that car owners would park at designated car parks and transfer to CSS bus services to enter the central business district (CBD).

Eleven inaugural services commenced operations by with NTUC Comfort operating four (1, 4, 6, 11) and Singapore Shuttle Bus (SSB) seven (2, 3, 5, 7–10), which plied between 16 fringe car parks, 7 city area termini and 49 selected bus stops with 88 25-30 seater single door Mercedes-Benz buses. However, the initial arrangement was not popular with car owners and the scheme was terminated, resulting in the company being allowed to operate regular services that extended into the housing estates and had reduced to nine services (six services operated by SSB and the three by NTUC Comfort). As the purpose of the CSS scheme was to serve working commuters, no services were operated on Sundays and public holidays. The bus services that extended towards the housing estates in 1976 are as follows:

- 1: Extended from National Stadium Carpark E and Holland Road Fringe Carpark to Queensway and Marine Terrace
- 2: Extended from Holland Road Fringe Carpark to Holland Drive
- 3: Extended from Chancery Lane Fringe Carpark to St Michael's
- 4: Diverted to terminate at Marine Terrace and extended to New Bridge Road
- 5: Extended from Whitley Road Fringe Carpark to Sin Ming
- 6: Extended from Serangoon Road Fringe Carpark and Outram Park to Bukit Merah and Circuit Road
- 7: Extended from Kampong Java Fringe Carpark to St Michael's
- 8: Extended from National Stadium Carpark E to Bedok South and Bedok
- 9: Extended from Serangoon Road Fringe Carpark to Geylang Lorong 1

On 25 June 1988, NTUC Comfort withdrew routes 1 and 4, citing a decline in commuter demand due to the MRT's opening. Its remaining service (route 6) ran until 1990, when the buses used reached the end of their permitted lifespans.

The initial fleet was replaced with larger DAF SB220 and Nissan Diesel buses. CSS was the first bus operator in Singapore to introduce senior concessionary fares, a scheme that was eventually extended to other bus operators. On 12 March 1987, SSB was purchased by Trans-Island Bus Services.

SSB provided public transport from the housing estates to the CBD areas. Services operated from interchanges and terminals like the Bedok and Bukit Merah bus interchanges as well as the Holland Drive, St Michael's and Sin Ming Road bus terminals. The services operated from 06:00 to 19:30 and did not operate on Sundays and public holidays. These services were renumbered into "6xx" in 1997 with the introduction of standardised numbering system. With the closure of Holland Drive Terminal in 1998, CSS 602 was re-routed to start from Shenton Way Terminal, looping at Holland Drive.

SSB's only bus depot was at Lorong 1 Geylang (GLDEP). The central workshop was at Ang Mo Kio Depot which handled all the preventive maintenance, repair works and major component overhauls.

On 9 July 2001, during the merger, the company was operating five routes and its depot was based at Lorong 1 Geylang Bus Terminal. In November 2001, the first service, CSS 602 was withdrawn and all non air-conditioned buses were retired.

Prior to the withdrawal of route 608, it was the last of the Nissan Diesel U31RCN buses to pass by the old National Stadium, Maxwell Road as well as the old Supreme Court Building. The bus fleet was downsized in the last three years of its service until its withdrawal. The last CSS service, 608, was initially slated to be withdrawn on 30 March 2007. However, due to public appeals, the withdrawal date was delayed to 28 April 2007.

=== Demise ===
During the SARS period between 2003 and 2004, CSS withdrew 3 services; 603, 605 and 607, leaving 608 as a standalone service. The older DAF SB220 buses were exported overseas and was later used in New Zealand, leaving the Nissan buses in the fleet. With the gradual decrease in ridership, some of the Nissan buses with CSS plates were transferred to the SMRT fleet in June 2006. SMRT progressively withdrew CSS routes, ending with the last route, Service 608, on 28 April 2007. Singapore Shuttle Bus became liquidated, all of its drivers were transferred to SMRT or its subsidiaries.
