= Fiat 343 =

Italian bus produced by Fiat Veicoli Industriali (1966-1978)

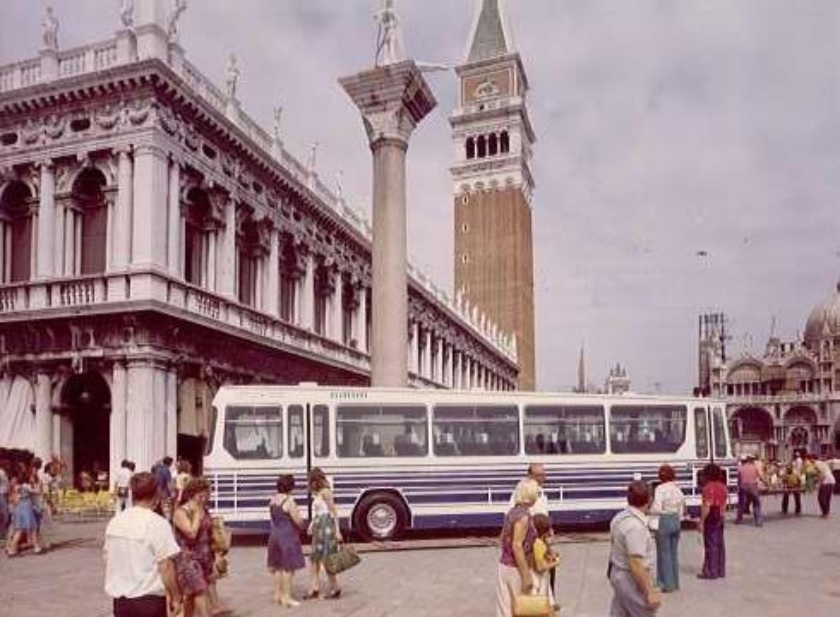
Barbi Fiat 343 in Venice (1974)

The Fiat 343 was an Italian bus produced by Fiat Veicoli Industriali (Fiat's bus division before the creation of the Iveco consortium) starting from 1966.

It was very similar to the previous Fiat 306, although it included numerous innovations. It was produced in two versions, one 11 meters and one (named 343L) 13 meter long. The engine was of two types, the FIAT 8200.12 (9,819 cc with 194 hp) and 8200.13 (10,308 cc with 208 hp, mounted on the 343L).

The production (also destined to foreign countries) ended in 1978, together with that of the Fiat 308. They were replaced by the Iveco 370, produced since 1977.
