= Debbie Ding =

Singaporean artist (born 1984)

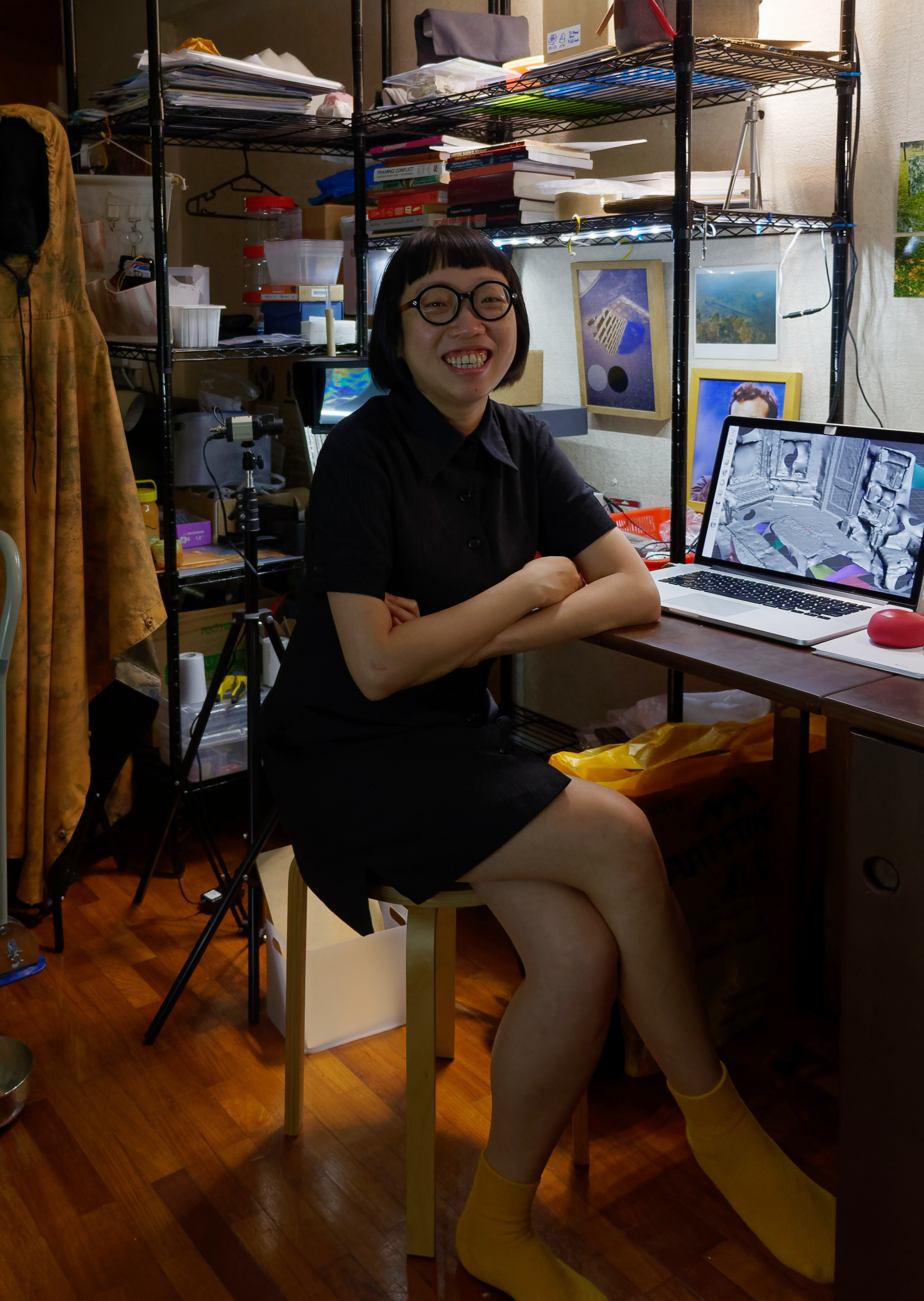
- Ding in 2018
- Born: 1984 (age 41–42); Singapore
- Education: Royal College of Art
- Website: dbbd.sg

Debbie Ding (born 1984) is a visual artist and technologist from Singapore. Her works often utilize non-conventional media such as holograms, food and soil, and explore subjects including archaeology, psychogeography and neuroscience.

== Career ==
Ding has exhibited widely in Singapore and internationally since 2010. She studied literature at the National University of Singapore, and a Masters in Design Interactions at Royal College of Art in London, graduating in 2015.

== Notable Works and Exhibitions ==
=== Paintpusher / Automatic Sketches (2019) ===
Computer-aided oil paintings produced iteratively on a robotic plotter from algorithmic sketches. Exhibited at Singapore ArtScience Museum as part of the Super-Trajectory exhibition.

=== Soil Works (2018) ===
A five-part installation, described as “a series of artistic investigations into soil in Singapore", commissioned by the Singapore Art Museum for the President's Young Talents 2018 exhibition.

=== War Fronts (2018) ===
A series of three large-format pulsed laser holograms depicting iconic World War II battlefronts in Singapore. Exhibited at the National Museum of Singapore and the Australian War Memorial.

=== Space Geodes (2016) ===
A series of 3D-printed objects based on publicly-uploaded photogrammetry scans of domestic interiors. Ding describes the process of converting poorly-scanned, non-manifold models into physical 3D objects as creating "fossils in reverse". Exhibited at Tainan Art Museum, Taiwan and Ota Fine Arts, Singapore in 2018.

=== Shelter (2016) ===
A 2016 Singapore Biennale commission installed at the Singapore Art Museum, Shelter is a life-size freestanding replica of a household bomb shelter, as found in Singapore Housing Development Board flats built since 1997.

=== The Library of Pulau Saigon (2015) ===
A series of 3D-printed objects based on a list of artefacts recovered from an archaeological dig in Singapore at the site of former island Pulau Saigon, modelled in OpenSCAD using "deep learning, shape recognition, 3D shape interpolation, and generative CAD modelling". The work was first exhibited at the Royal College of Art, London, and has subsequently been shown at the NUS Museum and the Singapore ArtScience Museum.

=== Dream Syntax (2013) ===
A book containing maps and stories of 102 of Ding's dreams. A version of Dream Syntax was recreated in VR at the Singapore ArtScience Museum in 2018.

=== Ethnographic Fragments from Central Singapore (2012) ===
A collection of urban rock fragments gathered at excavation sites in Singapore. This work was shortlisted for the Sovereign Asian Art Prize in 2013.

=== Here the River Lies (2010) ===
A participatory installation shown at The Substation and Singapore Art Museum, in which the public was invited to map out the psychogeography of the Singapore River.

== Publications ==
As a writer, Ding has published a number of artist books including:

- NewBiologist
- From Dust to Dust
- Dream Syntax
