= Tata Hispano =

Spanish bus and coach manufacturer

Tata Hispano Motors Carrocera, S.A.
- Company type: Subsidiary
- Industry: Automotive
- Founded: 1939; 87 years ago
- Founder: Vicenzo Angelino Gervasio
- Defunct: 2013
- Headquarters: Zaragoza, Spain
- Products: Bus and coach bodywork
- Parent: Tata Motors

Tata Hispano Motors Carrocera, S.A. (formerly Hispano Carrocera, S.A.), based in Zaragoza, Aragon, Spain, was one of the largest manufacturers of bus and coach cabins in Europe. It was a wholly owned subsidiary of the India-based Tata Motors. Tata Motors acquired control of the company in 2005, after purchasing a 21% stake in the company. In 2009, it acquired the remaining 79% from Investalia SA.

Apart from their main plant in Zaragoza, Hispano had a second one in Casablanca, Morocco; combined, they had a production capacity of 2,000 units in a year. Tata intended to keep the Moroccan plant open.

Hispano bodied buses were built by TATA Motors in India at the ACGL plant in Goa. The bus was called Tata Divo.

== History ==
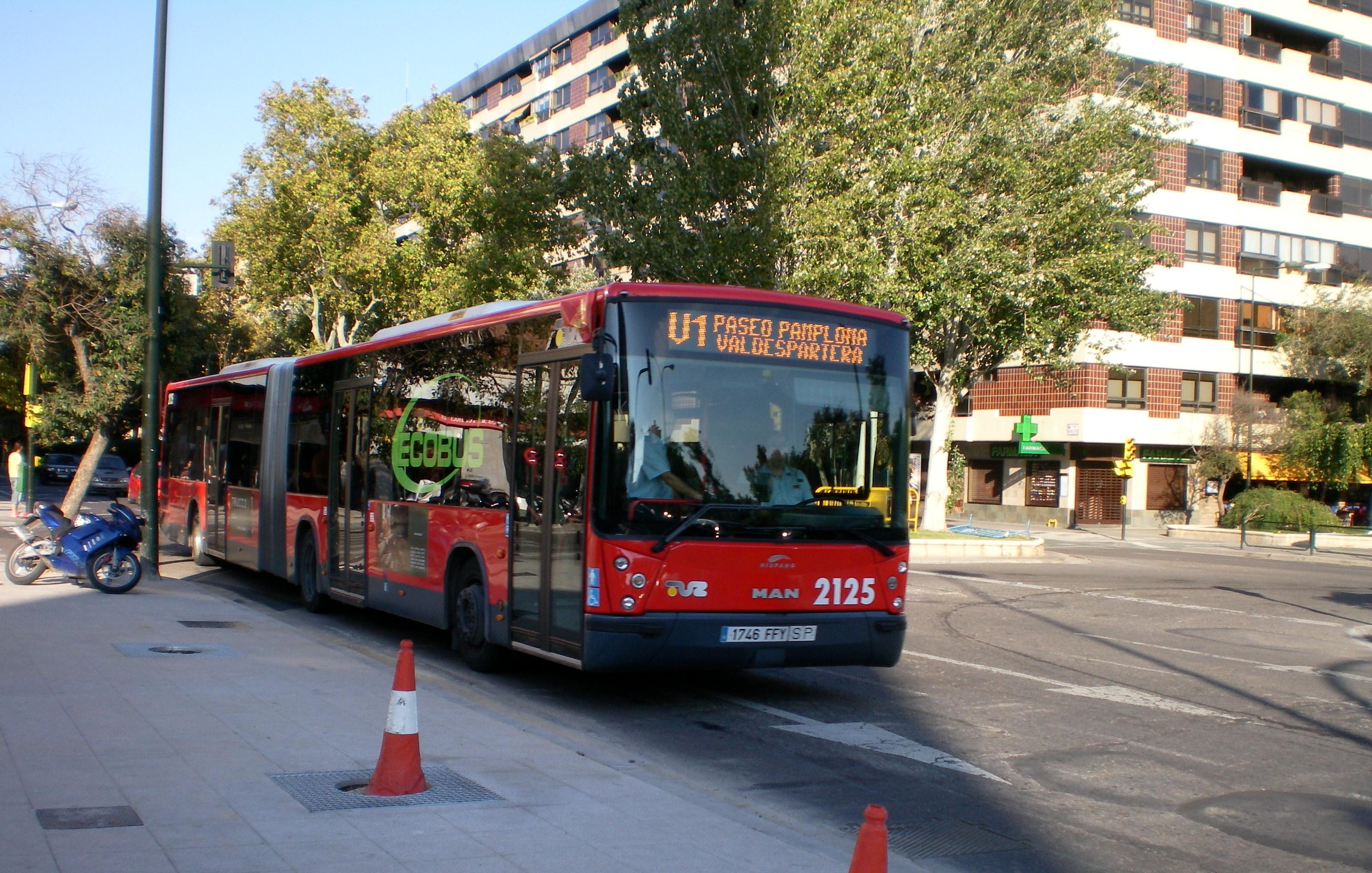
MAN NG313-F; Hispano Carrocera "Habit"

The company was founded in 1947 by D. Vincenzo Angelino Gervasio (an engineer of Neapolitan origin) and his wife Felisa Pueyo as Talleres Nápoles in Zaragoza, Spain. It was originally devoted to repairs, welding and metalwork on post-war trucks, but the company also developed its own design for a "unique truck cabin", which could be mounted on any chassis, and which was very successful. This success allowed the company to expand and move to a 3,000 m^{2} workshop, where it built its first bus in 1958 and its first double-decker bus in 1960. In 1962, the company moved again to newly built installations on the N-II road, becoming Factorías Nápoles, S.A., and begins to sell vehicles under its own brand, "Nazar" (an conflation of "Naples" and "Zaragoza"), in Spain and abroad. But in 1964, financial problems force the founder, Vicenzo Angelino, to leave the company, which changed its name again to Fabricaciones Industriales S.A.. In 1966, the company became part of Barreiros Diesel, S.A., which was in turn purchased by Chrysler in 1969, forming Chrysler España, S.A.. The bus and bodywork part of Chrysler España was then sold to Van Hool España, S.A. in 1971, which was later renamed to Hispano Carrocera, S.A.L. in 1983. The company manufactured Van Hool buses under license until developing the Hispano Carrocera brand in the late 1980s.

In 2005, sensing an opportunity in the fully built bus segment, Tata Motors from Mumbai acquired a 21% stake in Hispano Carrocera SA. In 2009, the Tata acquired the remaining 79% of in Hispano Carrocera for an undisclosed sum, making it a fully owned subsidiary, subsequently renamed Tata Hispano.

In September 2013, Tata announced the closure of the Zaragoza factory. It said sales had fallen and that future prospects for its marketplace were poor.

== Products ==
- City Buses
  - Habit
  - Area
  - Orbit (built in Casablanca only)
- Intercity touring Buses
  - DIVO Intercity
  - DIVO Luxury
  - Mosaic
  - Tata Hispano Globus (built in India only)
  - Xerus
  - Intea Intercity
- SUBURBAN & REGIONAL TRANSPORT
  - Intea Suburban
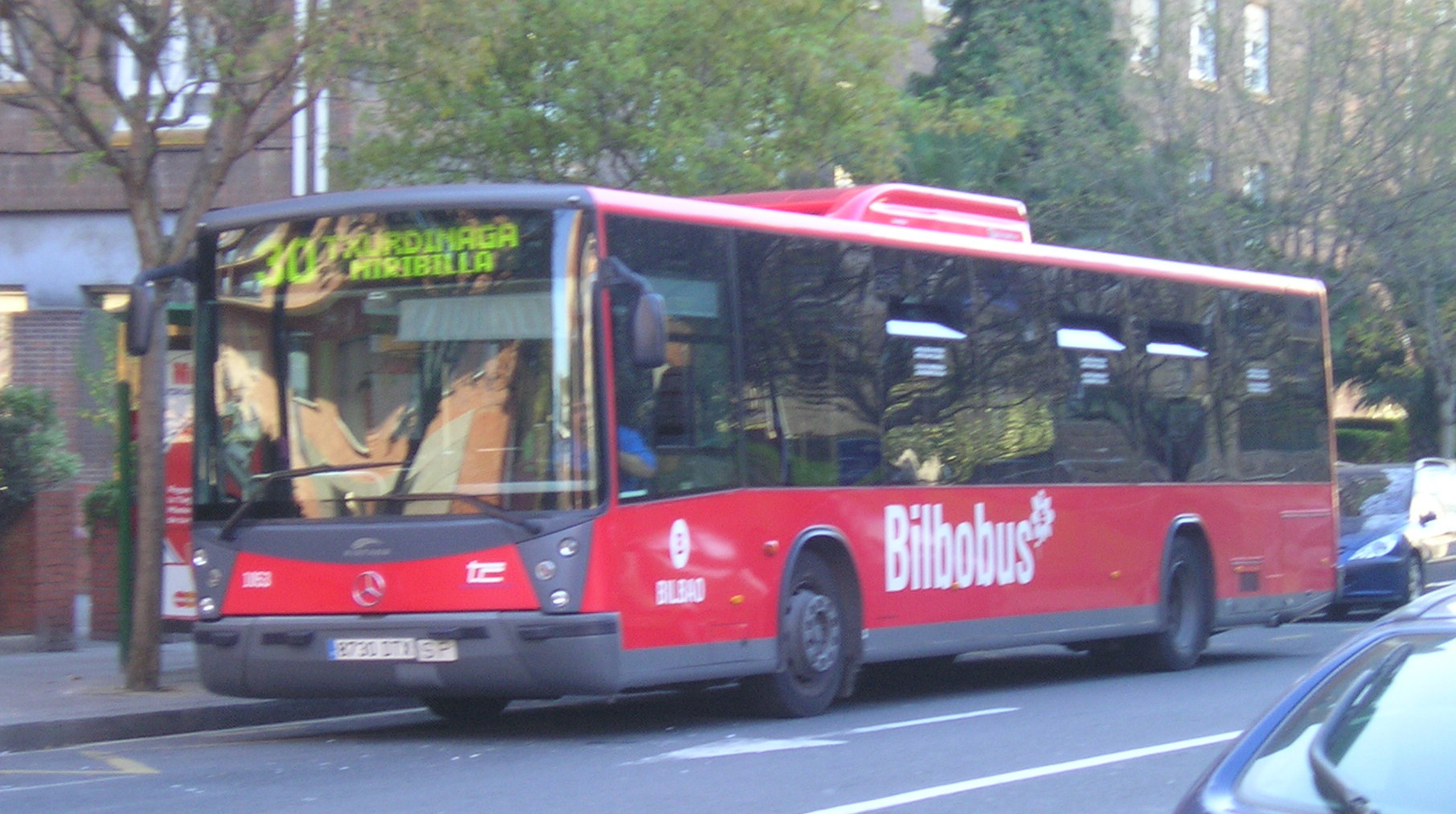
Bilbobus Mercedes (Hispano Habit)

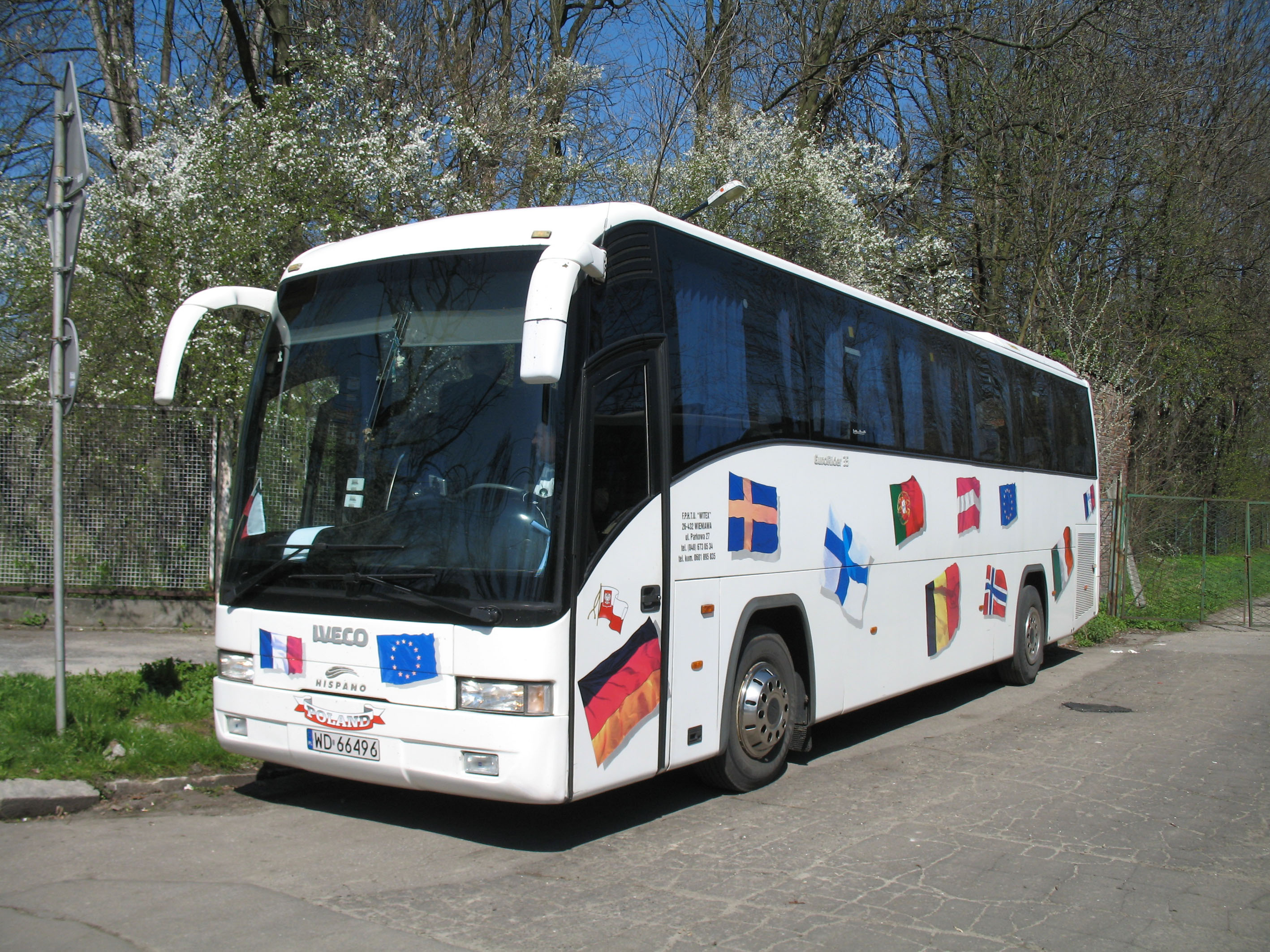
Hispano with Iveco EuroRider 35 chassis

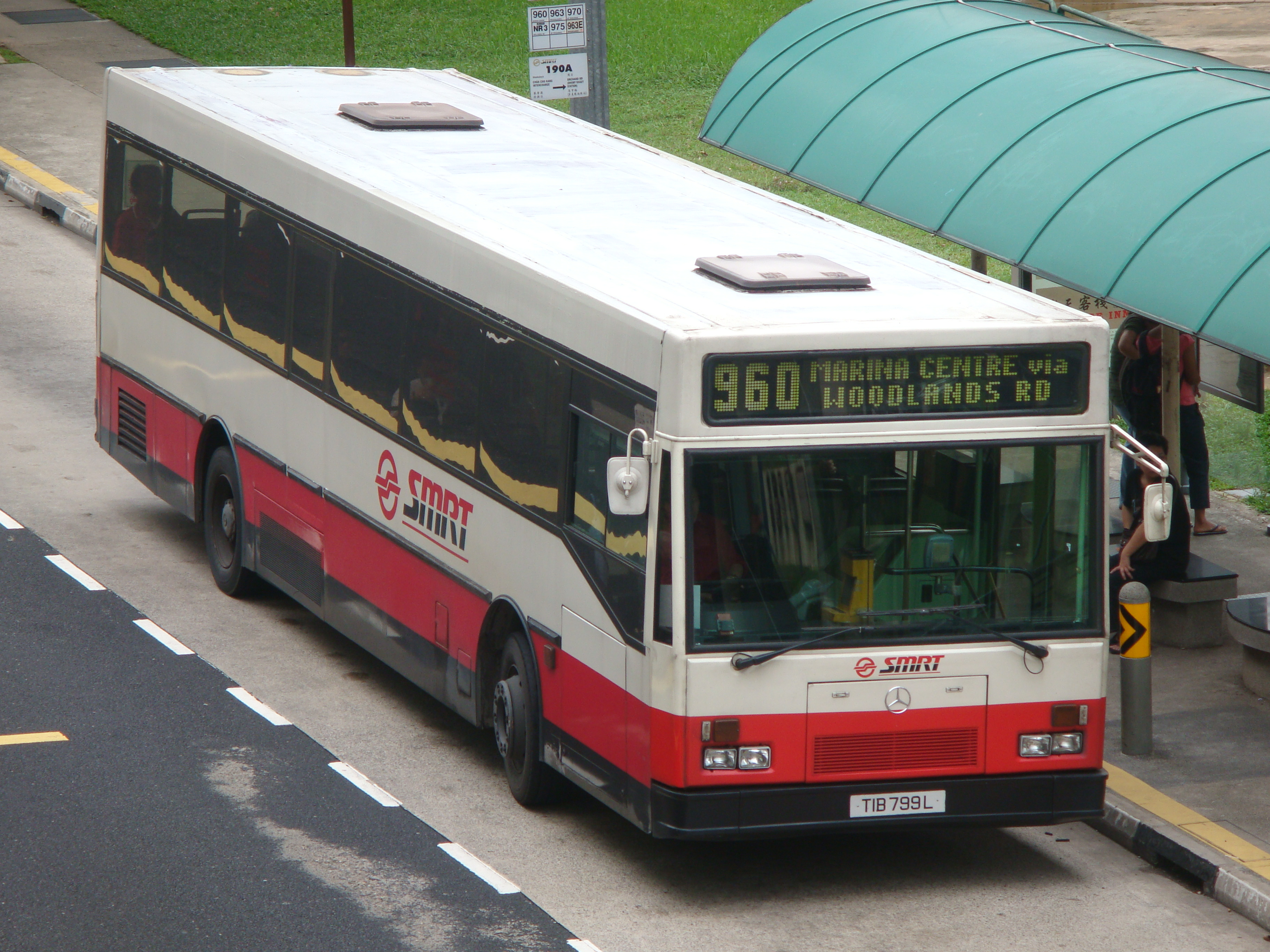
Mercedes-Benz O405 Hispano

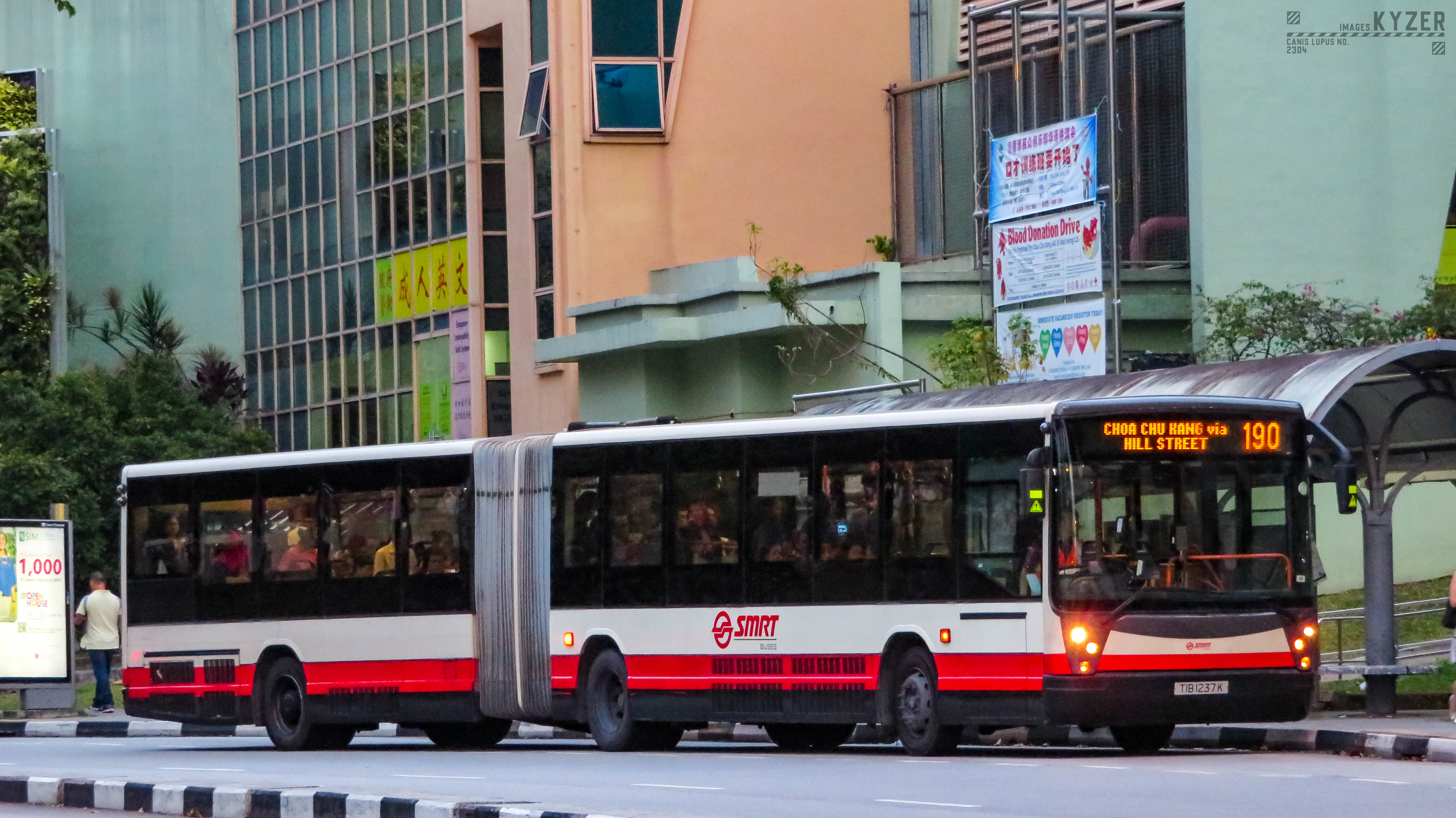
Mercedes-Benz O405G Hispano Habit

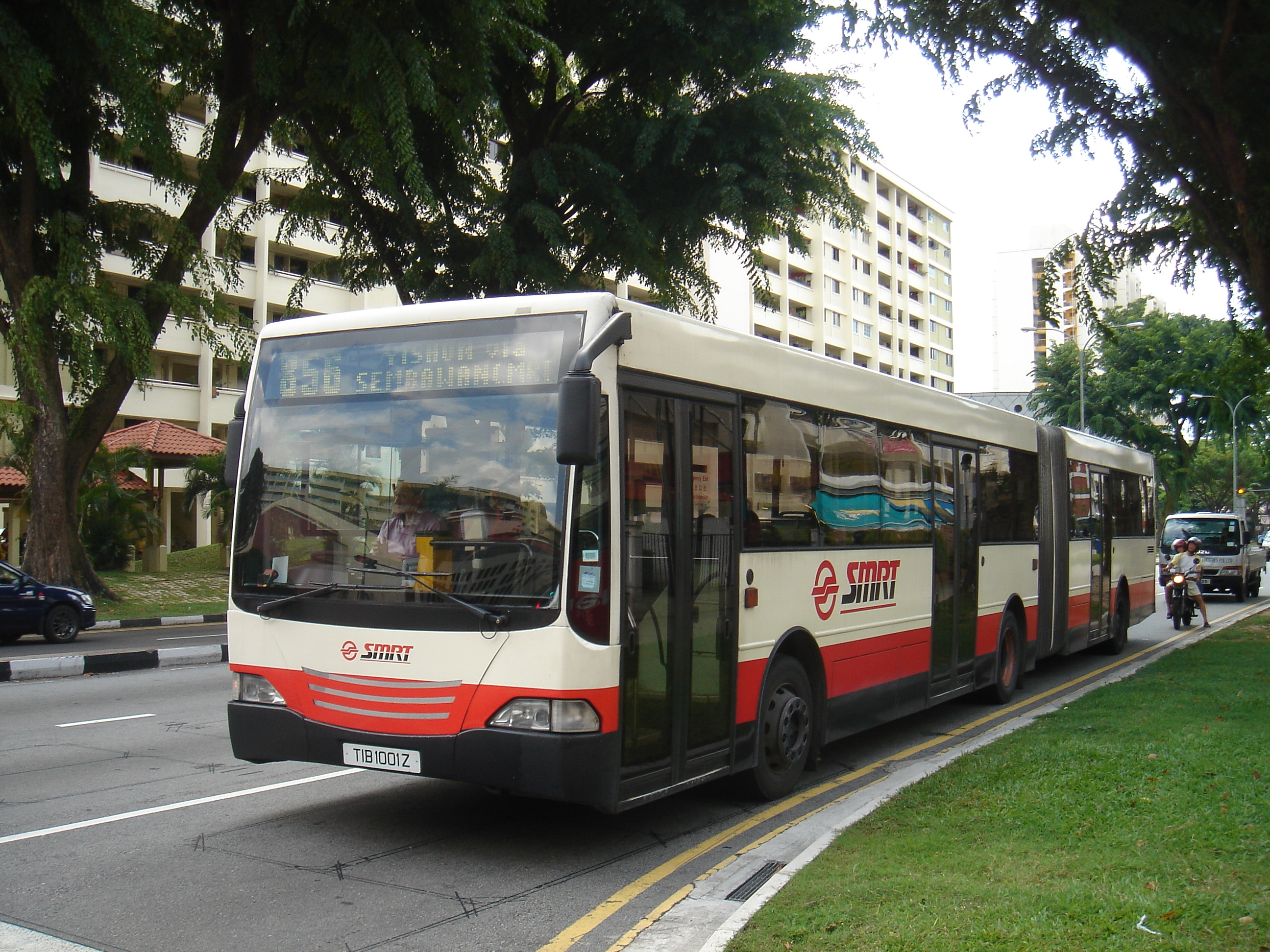
Mercedes-Benz O405G (2nd generation Hispano)

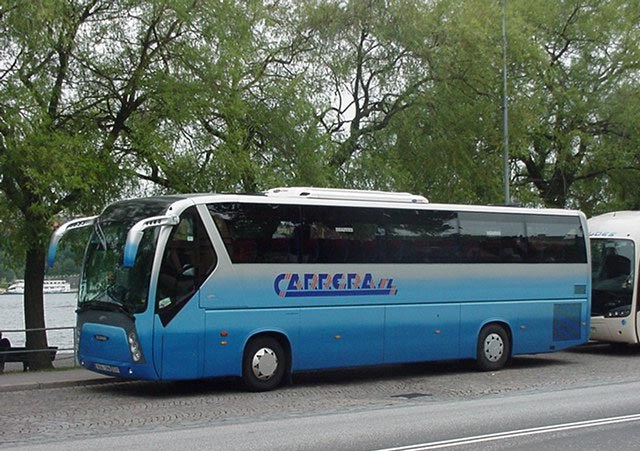
Hispano Divo
