= Carrozzeria Barbi =

Italian bus manufacturer

- Type: Joint-stock company
- Industry: Automotive industry
- Founded: 1905, Concordia sulla Secchia
- Founder: Galileo Barbi
- Defunct: 2018
- Headquarters: Mirandola, Italy
- Products: Buses
- Number of employees: 81
- Website: www.barbicoachandbus.eu

Carrozzeria Barbi is an Italian bus manufacturer, with headquarters in Mirandola, near Modena.

== History ==
The company was founded in 1905 by Galileo Barbi as a small workshop for the production of horse-drawn carriages in the small village of Fossa. In 1910 it moved to Concordia sulla Secchia.

In 1911 they won the International Exhibition in Paris in 1911 for the quality and comfort of the carriages produced.

In 1927, with the advent of motorization, car production began. The main plant was opened in Mirandola where they realized vehicles bodies on chassis of Alfa Romeo, Ansaldo, Lancia, Fiat and Officine Meccaniche. In 1931 the production focused on the realization of bodies for commercial vehicles: vans, cabins for trucks, trucks and ambulances, occupying about 70 workers. Subsequently, the first buses were made, first with a wooden structure and then with tubular steel.

During World War II, the production was temporarily converted for the wartime needs of the Ministry of the Navy, while in the post-war period the company participated in exhibitions and events industry bus (like the Golden Rose of San Remo), which allow to know the name in the Italian bus market.

In 1962 the founder died and the company passed to his son Sirner.

The 1970s were characterized by considerable investment. New models were made, innovative for their time, as the bus roof, the bus floor, the bus with seedlings structural inclined. They introduced innovations such as remote-controlled doors, acoustic and thermal insulation, air conditioning, reclining seats, heating, radio and television. The frames used were from DAF, Fiat, MAN, Mercedes and Renault.

In the 1980 Barbi started a collaboration with Volvo. Among the most important products of that decade is the Giorgetto Giugiaro-designed Italia 99.

On the death of Sirner Barbi in 1994, the management passed to the brothers Alberto and Carlo Barbi and the factory was transferred in the industrial Mirandola, in San Giacomo Roncole. That decade saw the introduction of the Echo coach.

In the 2000 was designed the model Genesis, the evolution of which became the Galileo in 2008. In 2007 the group produced some prototypes of a van for the horse transport and cabins for lifts. From 2009 has been sold the new version of Genesis, powered by Iveco and Irisbus chassis.

The company was liquidated in the year 2018. In October of the same year, a successor company is formed: Barbi Coach and Bus srl. They manufacture schoolbuses.
