= MAN Lion's Chassis =

Series of Bus Chassis introduced by MAN

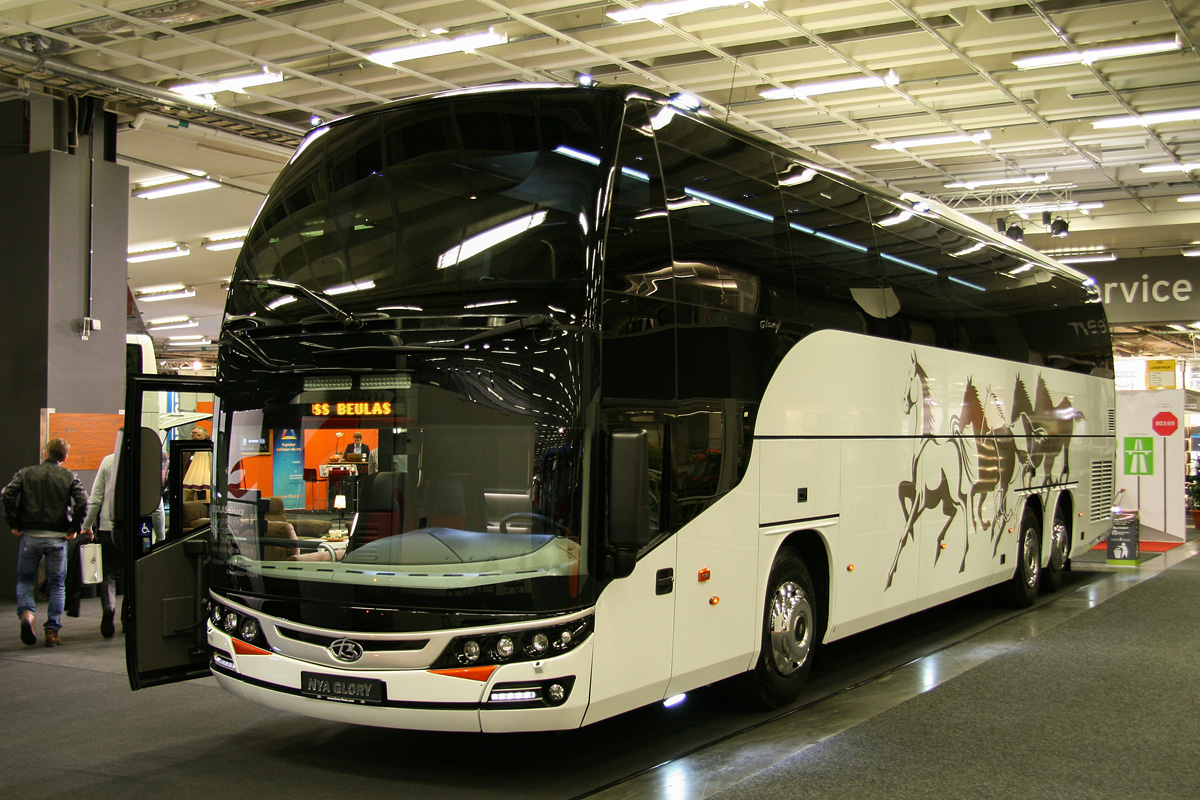
- Beulas Glory bodied MAN CO 26.480 at the Persontrafik 2012 fair in Gothenburg.

Overview
- Manufacturer: MAN
- Production: 2008–present
- Assembly: Germany: Salzgitter; Philippines: Quezon City (CKD)

Body and chassis
- Class: Bus chassis
- Floor type: Low entry Step entrance

Dimensions
- Length: 11-13 m (LE/IC/CO 19); 13.4-14.7 m (CO 26)

Chronology
- Predecessor: MAN 18.xxx HOCL-NL (A69); MAN 18.xxx HOCL (R33/R39); MAN 24.xxx HOCLN (R37); MAN SL 18.xxx HOC (A89); MAN SÜ xx3 F (A91)

MAN Lion's Chassis is a series of modular chassis made to replace most of MAN's rear-engined low-entry, intercity and coach chassis. It was first introduced at the IAA Commercial Vehicles 2008 in Hanover. MAN prospected both two- and tri-axle low-entry, two-axle intercity and two- and tri-axle coach versions. The first of the intercity version appeared in 2008, the two-axle low-entry version in 2009 and both coach versions in 2010. The tri-axle low-entry version may have been abandoned. The models that the Lion's Chassis was set to replace weren't discontinued until the end of 2013. All chassis versions can be delivered as either a rolling chassis with shortened wheelbase for transport or as CIB ("Chassis in the box" — partly assembled kit).

== MAN CO 19.xxx ==
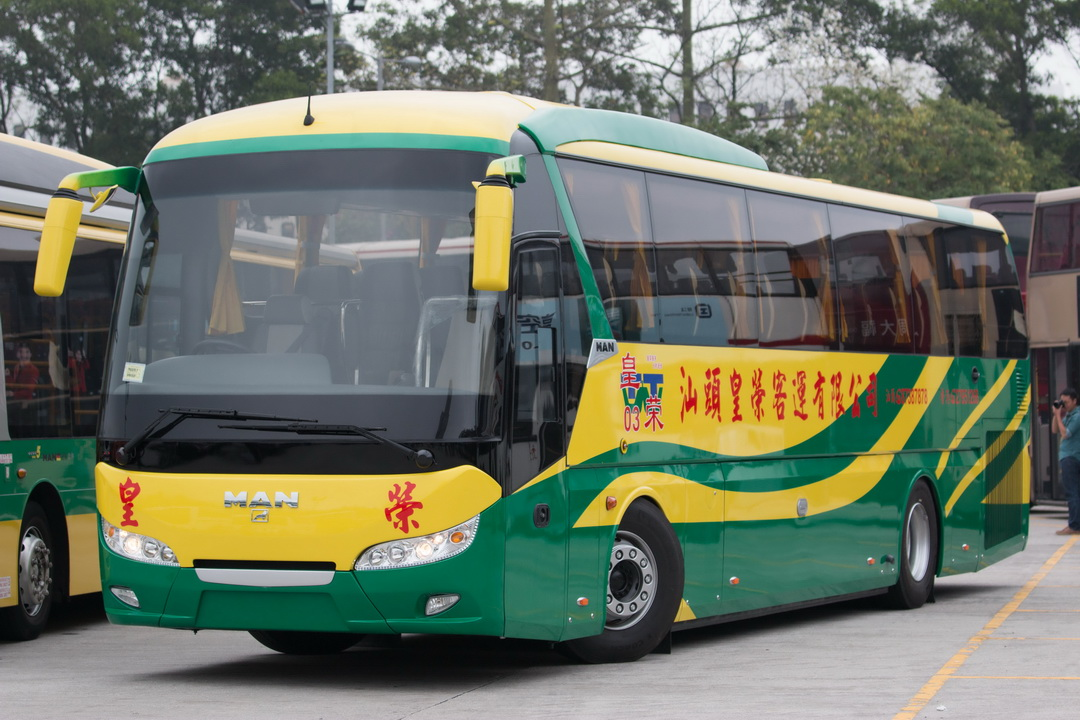
Tung Wing Tat bus Intercoach Lion's Pride bodied MAN CO 19.360

MAN CO 19.xxx is the two-axle 19.7 tonnes GVW coach version replacing the MAN 18.xxx HOCL (R33). Internal codes are RR2 for the normal version and RR3 for the CIB version. It is available as CO 19.350 and CO 19.430 with Euro III engines and CO 19.360, CO 19.400, CO 19.440 and CO 19.480 with Euro IV, EEV and Euro VI engines.

== MAN CO 26.xxx ==
MAN CO 26.xxx is the tri-axle 27.0 tonnes GVW coach version replacing the MAN 24.xxx HOCLN (R37). Internal codes are RR4 for the normal version and RR5 for the CIB version. It is available as CO 26.430 with Euro III engines, CO 26.480 with Euro IV engines and CO 26.360, CO 26.440 and CO 26.480 with EEV and Euro VI engines.

== MAN IC 19.xxx ==
MAN IC 19.xxx is the two-axle 19.5 tonnes GVW intercity version replacing both the MAN SL 18.xxx HOC (A89) and the MAN SÜ xx3 F (A91). Internal codes ar RR8 for the normal version and RR9 for the CIB version. It is available as IC 19.280 with Euro III and Euro IV engines and IC 19.250, IC 19.290, IC 19.320 and IC 19.360 with Euro V and Euro VI engines.

== MAN LE 19.xxx ==
MAN LE 19.xxx is the two-axle 19.5 tonnes GVW low-entry version replacing the MAN 18.xxx HOCL-NL (A69). Internal codes are RC2 for the normal version and RC3 for the CIB version. It is available as LE 19.280 with Euro III engines, LE 19.310 with Euro IV engines and LE 19.250, LE 19.290 and LE 19.320 with Euro V and Euro VI engines.
